= HMS Norge (1807) =

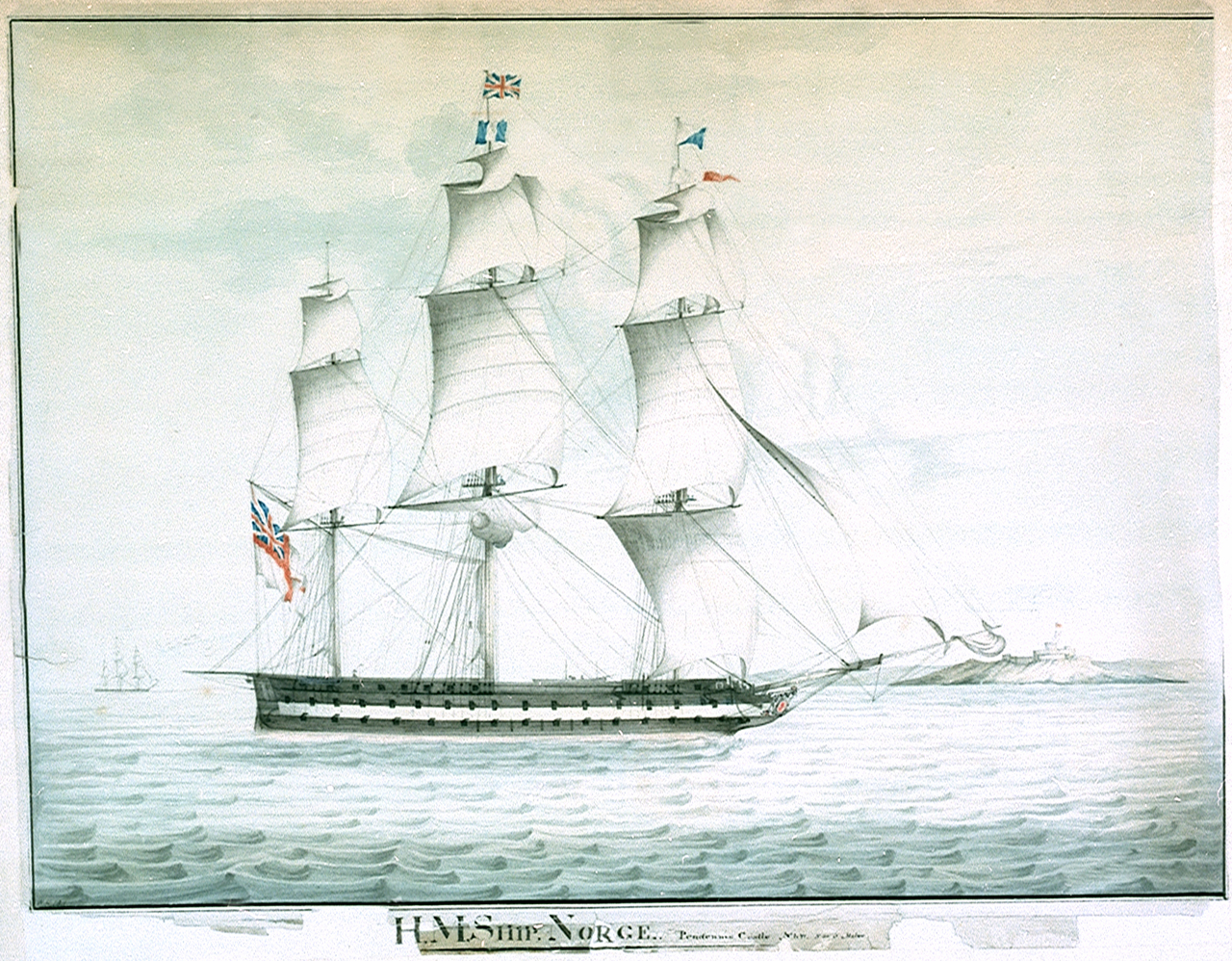
- HMS Norge off Pendennis Castle

History

Denmark & Norway
- Name: Norge
- Builder: Nyholm, Copenhagen
- Laid down: 13 April 1796
- Launched: 29 September 1800
- Commissioned: 1800
- Out of service: 1807
- Fate: Taken by the British at second Battle of Copenhagen (1807)

General characteristics
- Sail plan: Full-rigged ship

United Kingdom
- Name: Norge
- Acquired: By capture by the British at second Battle of Copenhagen (1807)
- Fate: Broken up 1817

General characteristics (British service)
- Tons burthen: 196039/94 (bm)
- Length: Overall: 183 ft 1 1/2 in (55.8 m); Keel: 124 ft 2 1/2 in (37.9 m)
- Beam: 49 ft 4 in (15.0 m)
- Depth of hold: 20 ft 5 in (6.2 m)
- Complement: 640
- Armament: Lower deck: 28 × 32-pounder guns; Upper deck: 32 × 18-pounder guns; QD: 4 × 12-pounder guns + 10 × 32-pounder carronades; Fc: 2 × 12-pounder guns + 2 × 32-pounder carronades

HDMS Norge was a Royal Dano-Norwegian Navy ship-of-the-line, built to a design by F. C. H. Hohlenberg. The British Royal Navy seized her in 1807, together with the rest of the Danish fleet after the second battle of Copenhagen. She served off Spain, in the mediterranean, and in the North Sea.

== In British Service ==
She was fitted out at Portsmouth from 21 November 1807 to 11 December 1808.

=== Napoleonic Wars ===
She was commissioned in April 1808 under Captain Edmund Boger. She was at Corunna in January 1809. It had been intended to rename her as Nonsuch in 1809 but the order was rescinded. From 1810 she was commanded by Captain John Sprat Rainier and was in the vicinity of Cadiz. In 1811 she was under the command of Temporary Captain William Waller, deployed in the Mediterranean. From 1812 to 1814, she was under the command of Captain Samuel Jackson, and sailed the North Sea.

=== War of 1812 ===
In August 1814, she was under the command of Captain Charles Dashwood. In September 1814, she set sail for North America, in convoy with transport ships carrying Major General John Keane and reinforcements to North America. Embarked aboard the Norge were Major Munro's company of the Royal Artillery and Lieutenant Hill.

The crew of the Norge participated in the Battle of Lake Borgne where her quartermaster was killed. The British lost 17 men killed and 77 wounded. Anaconda then evacuated the wounded. In 1821 the survivors of the flotilla shared in the distribution of head-money arising from the capture of the American gun-boats and sundry bales of cotton. (Note: A first-class share of the prize money was worth £34 12s 9 1/4d; a sixth-class share, that of an ordinary seaman, was worth 7s 10 3/4d.) (Note: 'Notice is hereby given to the officers and companies of His Majesty's ships Aetna, Alceste, Anaconda, Armide, Asia, Bedford, Belle Poule, Borer, Bucephalus, Calliope, Carron, Cydnus, Dictator, Diomede, Dover, Fox, Gorgon, Herald, Hydra, Meteor, Norge, Nymphe, Pygmy, Ramillies, Royal Oak, Seahorse, Shelburne, Sophie, Thames, Thistle, Tonnant, Trave, Volcano, and Weser, that they will be paid their respective proportions of prize money.') In 1847 the Admiralty issued a clasp (or bar) marked "14 Dec. Boat Service 1814" to survivors of the boat service who claimed the clasp to the Naval General Service Medal. (Note: The 'Names of Ships for which Claims have been proved' are as follows: warships Tonnant, Norge, Royal Oak, Ramillies, Bedford, Armide, Cydnus, Trave, Seahorse, Sophie, Meteor; troopships Gorgon, Diomede, Alceste, Belle Poule)

In the event of further conflict, Norge was tasked with to transmit supplies of corn to the Creek allies at Apalachicola in March 1815.

=== Fate ===
Norge departed Negril Bay on 6 June, and sailed from Havana on 17 June with a convoy. She arrived at Portsmouth on 7 August 1815. She was paid off in August 1815. (Note: Portsmouth. Monday [7 August 1815] — Arrived the Norge, of 74 guns, Capt. Dashwood, and Wolverine sloop with convoy from the West Indies... Sailed the Norge, of 74 guns, Capt. Dashwood... for Chatham to be paid off.) In March 1816 she was sold for £3000 at Chatham.
