= HMS Royal Oak (1809) =

Ship of the line of the Royal Navy

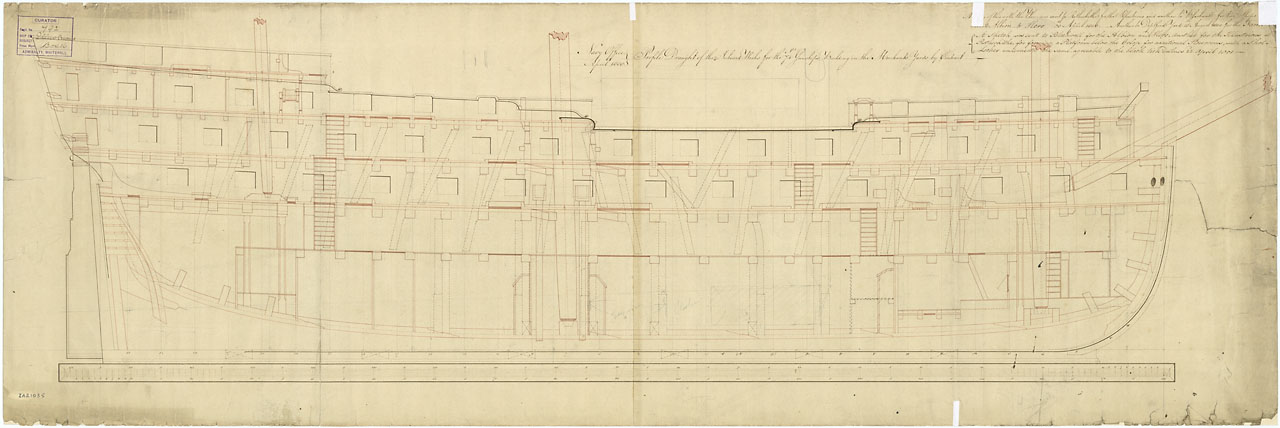
- An image of HMS Fame, Royal Oak's sister ship

History

United Kingdom
- Name: HMS Royal Oak
- Namesake: Royal Oak
- Builder: Dudman, Deptford Wharf
- Laid down: December 1805
- Launched: 4 March 1809
- Fate: Broken up, 1850

General characteristics
- Class & type: Fame-class ship of the line
- Tons burthen: 1759 (bm)
- Length: 175 ft (53 m) (gundeck)
- Beam: 47 ft 6 in (14.48 m)
- Depth of hold: 20 ft 6 in (6.25 m)
- Propulsion: Sails
- Sail plan: Full-rigged ship
- Complement: 650 officers and men (inc. 60-80 marines)
- Armament: 74 guns: Gundeck: 28 × 32-pounder guns; Upper gundeck: 28 × 18-pounder guns; Quarterdeck: 4 × 12-pounder guns, 10 × 32-pounder carronades; Forecastle: 4 × 12-pounder guns, 2 × 32-pounder carronades; Poop deck: 6 × 18-pounder carronades

HMS Royal Oak was a 74-gun third rate ship of the line of the Royal Navy, launched on 4 March 1809 at Dudman's yard at Deptford Wharf. Her first commanding officer was Captain Pulteney Malcolm.

== Napoleonic Wars ==
In 1812 Royal Oak was under the command of Captain Thomas George Shortland, who was superseded by Captain Edward Dix in 1813. During this time she was the flagship of Rear-Admiral Lord Amelius Beauclerk, of the Texel.

== War of 1812 ==
Royal Oak shared with other vessels in the proceeds of the capture on 17 December 1813 of the American vessel Maria Antoinette. (Note: A first-class share of the prize money was worth £230 8s 2d; a sixth-class share, that of an ordinary seaman, was worth £1 10s 1d.)

On 1 June 1814 Rear-Admiral Pulteney Malcolm, who had hoisted his flag aboard Royal Oak, proceeded with troops under Brigadier-General Robert Ross to North America. Malcolm accompanied Sir Alexander Cochrane on the expedition up the Chesapeake and regulated the debarkation and embarkation of the troops employed against Washington and Baltimore.

Ross was killed on 12 September 1814 in Baltimore, Maryland, Royal Oak would carry his body to Halifax, Nova Scotia, for interment on 29 September 1814.

In December Royal Oak was with the fleet under Cochrane preparing for the attack on New Orleans. Before the attack, her boats participated in the Battle of Lake Borgne.

On 8 December 1814, two US gunboats fired on Sophie, Armide and the sixth-rate frigate Seahorse while they were passing the chain of small islands that runs parallel to the shore between Mobile and Lake Borgne.

Between 12 and 15 December 1814, Captain Lockyer of Sophie led a flotilla of some 50 boats, barges, gigs and launches to attack the US gunboats. Lockyer drew his flotilla from the fleet that was massing against New Orleans, including the 74-gun Third Rates Royal Oak and Tonnant, and a number of other vessels including Armide, Seahorse, Manly and Meteor.

Lockyer deployed the boats in three divisions, of which he led one. Captain Montresor of the gun-brig Manly commanded the second, and Captain Roberts of Meteor commanded the third. After rowing for 36 hours, the British met the Americans at St. Joseph's Island. On 13 December 1814, the British attacked the one-gun schooner USS Sea Horse. On the morning of the 14th, the British engaged the Americans in a short, violent battle.

The British captured the entire American force, including the tender, USS Alligator, and five gunboats. The British lost 17 men killed and 77 wounded; Royal Oak had only one man wounded. Anaconda then evacuated the wounded. In 1821 the survivors of the flotilla shared in the distribution of head-money arising from the capture of the American gun-boats and sundry bales of cotton. (Note: A first-class share of the prize money was worth £34 12s 9¼d; a sixth-class share, that of an ordinary seaman, was worth 7s 10¾d.) In 1847 the Admiralty issued a clasp (or bar) marked "14 Dec. Boat Service 1814" to survivors of the boat service who claimed the clasp to the Naval General Service Medal. (Note: The 'Names of Ships for which Claims have been proved' are as follows: warships Tonnant, Norge, Royal Oak, Ramillies, Bedford, Armide, Cydnus, Trave, Seahorse, Sophie, Meteor; troopships Gorgon, Diomede, Alceste, Belle Poule)

In support of the attack on New Orleans, sixty Royal Marines from Royal Oak were disembarked. One of these men was killed in action on 8 January 1815, as a force of marines, sailors, and soldiers of the 85th Regiment of Foot commanded by Colonel William Thornton successfully assaulted American positions on the west bank of the Mississippi. The naval contingent was under the command of Commander Rowland Money, of Trave, who was severely wounded in the attack.

After the end of the War of 1812, she returned to Great Britain, arriving at Portsmouth on 30 May 1815.

== Fate ==
From 1825 Royal Oak was employed on harbour service, until in 1850 she was broken up.
