= New Orleans station (US Navy) =

New Orleans Station
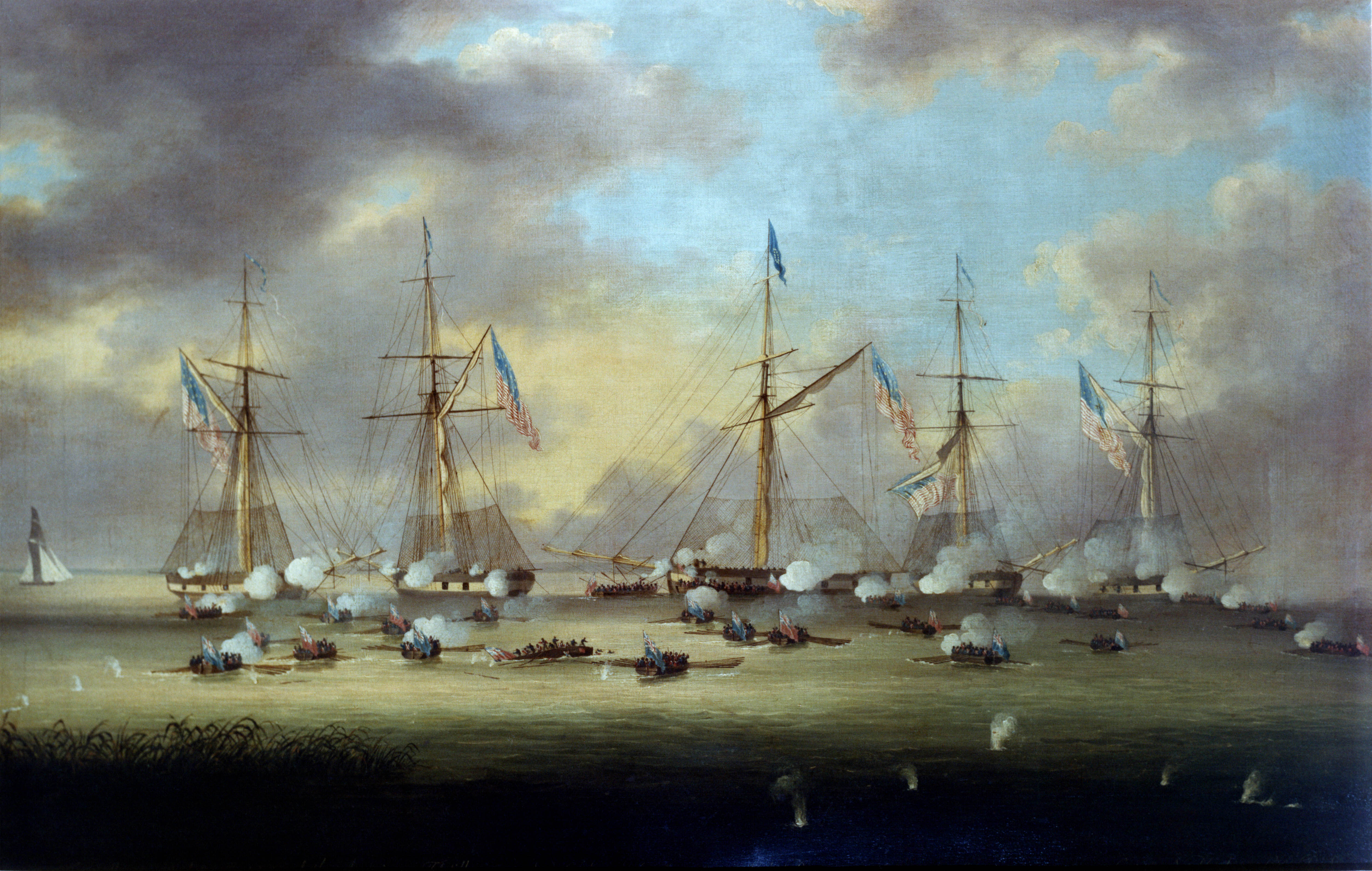
- British and American Gunboats in Action on Lake Borgne, 14 December 1814 by Thomas Lyde Hornbrook
- Active: 1805–1826
- Country: United States
- Branch: United States Navy
- Type: command
- Garrison/HQ: New Orleans
- Conflicts: War of 1812; Battle of Lake Borgne; Battle of New Orleans; Bombardment of Fort St Philip

Commanders
- Notable commanders: John Shaw; David Porter; John Shaw; Daniel Todd Patterson

The New Orleans Station of the US Navy was created following the Louisiana Purchase. It was this Naval presence, in the form of gunboats and repair facilities, that reinforced the policy of Thomas Jefferson's administration that West Florida was part of the Louisiana Purchase. Having fulfilled this original purpose, it fell victim to cuts in military spending after the War of 1812 by president James Monroe. It was closed down in 1826, when the Pensacola Station with its Pensacola Naval Yard was created. It was not until 1893 that a Naval station was re-established in New Orleans.

During his tenure as commanding officer at New Orleans, from 1808 to 1810, Porter set up an optical telegraph network, inspired by the one established by the French, and copied by the British. As such, it was the first American navy command to have a telegraph network, several years prior to the Commandant of the New York Naval Shipyard creating the network between Sandy Hook and New York in 1812, at the behest of President Madison.

== History ==
=== Early years ===
The Secretary of the Navy ordered Captain Daniel Carmick to set sail with a detachment of 300 marines. Upon arrival, Spanish troops still occupied the barracks, so they were billeted next to the powder store. Captain John Shaw was appointed the Commandant of the New Orleans Station and ordered to sail there on January 20, 1806.

The first two Jeffersonian gunboats for New Orleans, named Numbers 11 and 12, were built under the supervision of Commodore Edward Preble. They were assigned in mid 1806, and arrived in October 1806. They left Portland, Maine as a four vessel flotilla under the command of Lieutenant Jacob Jones commander of the bomb vessel USS Etna, accompanied by the bomb vessel USS Vesuvius, and remained until 1807. Thereafter, they cruised around Lake Pontchartrain and Lake Maurepas due to tensions with Spain. At the start of December 1806, they were recalled, heading to Natchez, Mississippi due to the Burr conspiracy. Shaw was ordered to Washington for the Burr trial, and was replaced by David Porter. Porter found that the actual headcount under his command was far below its book strength of 400 men.

The USS Etna, now commanded by the brother of William Bainbridge, Joseph, accompanied by USS Vesuvius, sailed for New York in September 1807.

Upon returning from the Mediterranean, John D. Henley was posted to the station. In 1807 he served aboard Gunboat No. 20. He was later appointed the commander of USS Carolina. A young David Farragut accompanied his mother when his father was posted to the station. Master George Farragut, as commander of Gunboat No. 19, was at New Orleans and in New Orleans Nary Yard from July through December 1807.

In an effort to enforce the Embargo Act of 1807, Porter patrolled Lakes Pontchartrain and Maurepas, routes used by smugglers to ferry contraband materials. Porter divided his boats into "divisions", each with its own colored pennant. The lake division flew a blue pennant. Porter established a Navy Hospital at Bay St Louis, as well as repair facilities on the Tchefuncte River in addition to the New Orleans base.

A further innovation introduced by Porter was the telegraph. In Europe, there was typically a distance between the telegraph stations of six to ten miles. Owing to the twisting of the Mississippi, and the dense forests along its banks, the stations were three to four miles apart. On February 3, 1809, Porter reported that twelve stations had been built, extending 45 miles below New Orleans, halfway to the start of the river delta. These shorter distances meant that the operating costs were greater than for the equivalent networks in Europe. The Secretary of the Navy stopped further construction on the grounds of excessive cost. Had the network been extended to the end of the river, it would have been possible to send or receive a message from the Balize in five minutes.

In 1810 Shaw was appointed the Commandant of the New Orleans Station for a second time. Captain Shaw traveled to St. Francisville, to join Governor William C. C. Claiborne, to follow orders from Washington to annex West Florida. The five gunboats of the River Division, stationed at Natchez, commanded by Daniel Patterson, transported the troops downriver, two miles (3.2 km) from the fort at Baton Rouge, Louisiana. Having disembarked the troops, Patterson sailed down river, and formed a line parallel to the fort.

=== War of 1812 ===
The Station prepared for war, even though the Atlantic Coast was the primary scene of operations. The most dramatic incident in 1812 was the ferocious hurricane on August 19 and 20. In 1813, permission was granted to build a 22-gun blockship frigate, to protect the Tchefuncte River. In 1814, work on the blockship frigate, despite being 80% completed, was ordered to stop by the new Secretary of the Navy. When the War of 1812 broke out with Great Britain, of the 14 gunboats Shaw had to defend New Orleans, only 10 were operational. Also under his command were the brigs USS Syren, USS Viper, and USS Enterprise; Shaw also purchased the commercial vessel Remittance on behalf of the Navy to become USS Louisiana, a ship in poor condition that nonetheless met muster at the Battle of New Orleans.

While there was no active conflict in the Gulf until the war's waning years, and Shaw worked to prepare coastal defenses (including a blockship), he also had to contend with "extensive" piracy and smuggling on his coast. Pirate ships were duplicitously flying the flags of the newly independent United Provinces of New Granada and Captaincy General of Venezuela, and illegal attacks on Spanish ships were coming from a pirate base in Louisiana's Barataria Bay. In March 1813, Shaw commanded the naval component of General Wilkinson's seizure of the Imperial Spanish city of Mobile. When he left in October 1813, reassigned to Boston, Shaw was succeeded at New Orleans by his second-in-command, Daniel Patterson.

On October 18, 1813, Patterson was given command of the Naval Station at New Orleans. On September 16, 1814, Patterson raided the base of the French pirate Jean Lafitte at Barataria Bay, in cooperation with Colonel George T. Ross, capturing six schooners and several smaller vessels. In that same month, he refused Andrew Jackson's request to send his few naval units to Mobile Bay where Patterson knew they would be bottled up by a numerically superior Royal Navy fleet. Patterson's naval assets were limited to six gunboats, a schooner, a sloop, as well as USS Carolina and Louisiana.

Foreseeing British designs against New Orleans almost two months before their attack, Patterson, not Jackson, was the first to prepare to defend the city. On November 18, he outlined his plans to use the Louisiana, in concert with shore batteries, in a letter to the Secretary of the Navy. The American victory at New Orleans resulted as much from his foresight and preparations as from Jackson's able fighting. His flotilla delayed the British advance at the Battle of Lake Borgne until reinforcements arrived, then gave artillery support in defense of the fortifications on the right bank of the Mississippi River, from fortifications or craft borne in the Mississippi. On the Left Bank, Lieutenants Ortho Norris and Charles Crawley, and their gun crews, formerly of USS Carolina manned gun positions on Line Jackson.

Daughan notes that while the part played by the US Navy at the battle has remained hidden, it was a key factor in the victory, as acknowledged by Jackson. Patterson, highly commended by Jackson, received a note of thanks from Congress, and was promoted to Captain on February 28, 1815. Patterson remained on the southern stations until June 23, 1824. The part played by Acting Lieutenant (navy) Cunningham, during the Bombardment of Fort St. Philip was mentioned in the despatch of Patterson to the Secretary of the Navy dated January 27.

As the war drew to a close, the station had lost many of its assets. The flotilla of five gunboats – No. 156, No. 163, No. 5, No. 23, and No. 162 – under Thomas ap Catesby Jones were captured, as was USS Alligator. USS Sea Horse was scuttled, and USS Carolina was destroyed, on December 13 and December 27 respectively.

=== Postwar ===
By the end of the decade, piracy had been eliminated in the Gulf of Mexico, and was now prevalent in the Caribbean Sea. In response, the West Indies Squadron (United States) was formed. It did not operate from New Orleans, but was based at Pensacola, Florida, having initially been based in the Virgin Islands.

Congress passed a law to give the President the power to sell military facilities that were no longer needed. In 1820, the New Orleans and Tchefuncte facilities were earmarked for closure. In 1823 the remaining equipment and stores in the yard were shipped to the new facility at Pensacola. The final official act carried out at the Tchefuncte facility was a repair to the schooner USS Grampus which had been fighting pirates in the Caribbean, as part of the West Indies Squadron.

The order came from Washington to close the New Orleans Navy Yard in 1826. The Pensacola Navy Yard became one of the best equipped naval stations in the country. In its early years the base dealt mainly with the suppression of slave trade and piracy in the Gulf and Caribbean.

Despite the Navy's purchase of 3 acres of land fronting on the Mississippi River on February 17, 1849, it was not until 1893 that a Naval station with ship repair facilities was re-established. A further 212 acres were purchased, and construction of the US Naval Station, Algiers, Louisiana was completed in 1903.

== Commanders ==
- Captain John Shaw (Jan 20, 1806 - Feb 28, 1808)
- Captain David Porter (Mar 1, 1808-Jul 6, 1810)
- Captain John Shaw (Jul 7, 1810 - Oct 17, 1813)
- Captain Daniel Todd Patterson (Oct 18, 1813 - June 23, 1824)

== Bibliography ==
- Ainsworth, Walden L. (February 1945). "An Amphibious Operation That Failed: The Battle of New Orleans". Proceedings of the United States Naval Institute. 71 (504): 193–202.
- Brannan, John, ed. (1823). Official letters of the military and naval officers of the United States : during the war with Great Britain in the years 1812, 13, 14, & 15. Washington, D.C.: Way & Gideon. OCLC 1083481275.
- Cooper, J. Fenimore (1846). "John Shaw". Lives of Distinguished American Naval Officers. Vol. I. Auburn, New York: J. C. Derby & Co. pp. 123–146.
- Daughan, George C. (2011). 1812: The Navy's War. New York: Basic Books. ISBN 978-0-465-02046-1.
- Dudley, William S., ed. (1992). "The Gulf Coast Theater: January–December 1813". The Naval War of 1812: A Documentary History. Naval Historical Center. Vol. II. Washington, D.C.: United States Navy (GPO). pp. 629–682. ISBN 0-945274-06-8.
- Dudley, William S (February 2015). "The Pinchpenny Flotilla". Naval History. 29 (1). U.S. Naval Institute: 38–45.
- Knox, Dudley William, ed. (1945). REGISTER of OFFICER PERSONNEL, United States Navy and Marine Corps and SHIPS' DATA 1801-1807 (PDF). Published under the Direction of THE HONORABLE JAMES V. FORRESTAL, Secretary of the Navy, Prepared by the Office of Naval Records and Library, Navy Department. By Authority of Act of Congress Approved March 15,1934. United States Navy (GPO) – via Naval History and Heritage Command.
- Long, David F (1970). Nothing Too Daring: A Biography of Commodore David Porter, 1780–1843. Annapolis, Maryland: United States Naval Institute. ISBN 978-1-59-114430-4.
- Martin, Tyrone G. (September 2013). "Armaments and Innovations - The Navy Toys With Telegraphy". Proceedings of the United States Naval Institute. 27 (5).
- Roosevelt, Theodore (1900). The Naval War of 1812. Vol. II. New York: G.P. Putnam's Sons. OCLC 25850693 – via archive.org.
- Sharp, Donald J. (April 8, 2009). "The Establishment of the United States Navy at New Orleans, after the Louisiana Purchase, and its Influence on West Florida" – via donaldsharphistory.blogspot.com. "Welcome to the historical research collection of Donald J. Sharp, much of which focuses on the Tchefuncte River on the north shore of Lake Pontchartrain, as well as New Orleans, LA, and the Gulf Coast areas of Mississippi and Alabama."
- Sweetman, Jack (2002). American Naval History: An Illustrated Chronology of the U.S. Navy and Marine Corps, 1775–present. Annapolis, MD: Naval Institute Press. ISBN 1-55750-867-4.
- Anonymous (1946). "Appendix A, History of US Naval Repair Base, New Orleans, Louisiana". www.ibiblio.org/hyperwar/. United States Naval Administration in World War II, History of the Eighth Naval District. New Orleans.
- Anonymous (March 22, 2018). "Patterson, Daniel Todd". ZB (Personnel) Files in the Navy Department Library » ZB Files - P » – via Naval History and Heritage Command.
- Anonymous (January 21, 2020). "Shaw, John". ZB (Personnel) Files in the Navy Department Library » ZB Files - S ». United States Navy – via Naval History and Heritage Command.
