= HMS Tonnant =

80-gun ship of the line

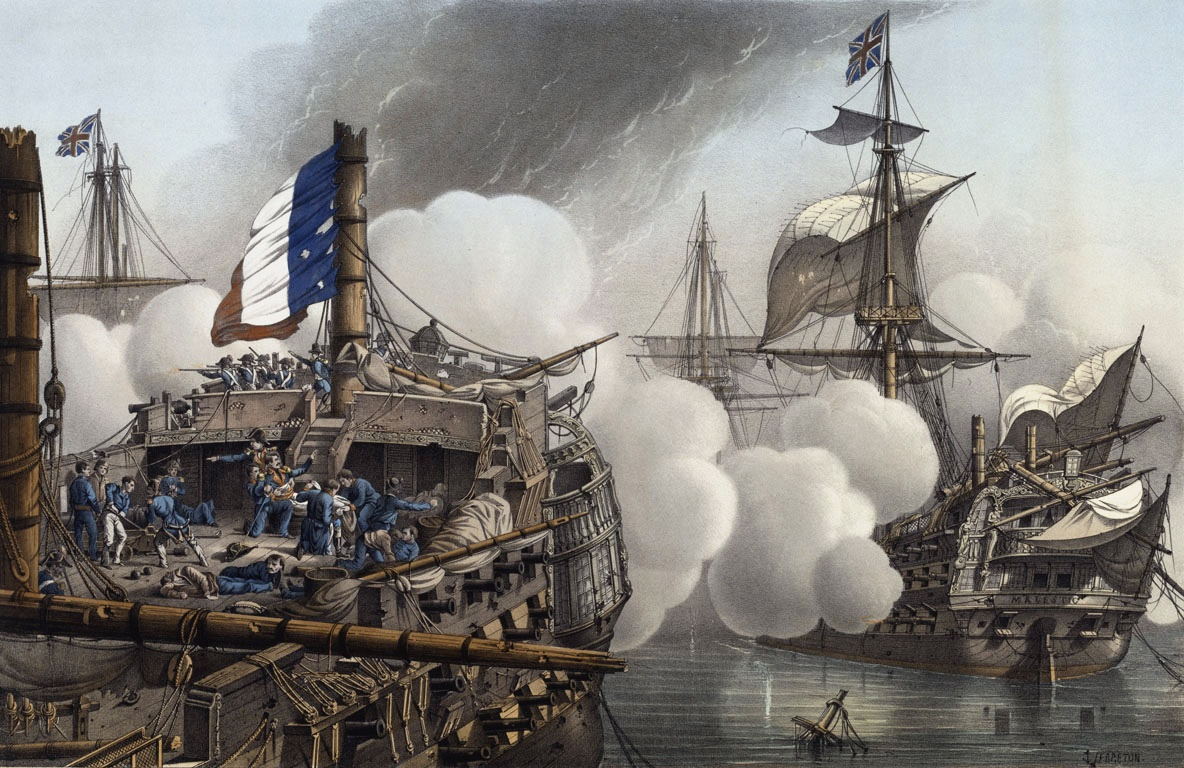
- Tonnant at the Battle of the Nile, by Louis Le Breton

History

France
- Name: Tonnant
- Laid down: November 1787
- Launched: 24 October 1789
- Completed: September 1790
- Honours and awards: Participated in: Battle of Genoa; Battle of the Nile
- Captured: By the Royal Navy on 2 August 1798

Great Britain
- Name: HMS Tonnant
- Acquired: Captured on 2 August 1798
- Honours and awards: Participated in: Battle of Trafalgar; Burning of Washington; Battle of Baltimore; Battle of Lake Borgne (ships' boats)
- Fate: Broken up in March 1821

General characteristics
- Class & type: 80-gun Tonnant-class ship of the line
- Displacement: 3,868 tonneaux
- Tons burthen: 2,034 port tonneaux; 2,2813/94 (bm)
- Length: 194 ft 2 in (59.2 m) (gundeck); 160 ft (48.8 m) (keel)
- Beam: 51 ft 9 1/4 in (15.8 m)
- Depth of hold: 23 ft 3 in (7.1 m)
- Sail plan: Full-rigged ship
- Complement: 700
- Armament: French service: 30 × 36-pounder long guns; 32 × 24-pounder long guns; 18 × 12-pounder long guns; 4 × obusiers de vaisseau; British service: Lower deck: 32 × 32-pounder guns; Upper deck: 32 × 18-pounder guns; QD: 2 × 18-pounder guns + 14 × 32-pounder carronades; Fc: 4 × 32-pounder carronades

HMS Tonnant (lit. 'Thundering') was an 80-gun ship of the line of the Royal Navy. She had previously been Tonnant of the French Navy and the lead ship of the Tonnant class. The British captured her in August 1793 during the Siege of Toulon but the French recaptured her when the siege was broken in December. Rear-Admiral Horatio Nelson captured her at Aboukir Bay off the coast of Egypt at the Battle of the Nile on 1 August 1798. She was taken into British service as HMS Tonnant. She went on to fight at the Battle of Trafalgar in 1805, during the Napoleonic Wars.

During the War of 1812 with the United States, Vice-Admiral Sir Alexander Cochrane assumed command of the North American Station at the end of 1813, and in June 1814 Tonnant became his flagship. On 7 September 1814 Francis Scott Key and John Stuart Skinner dined aboard the ship while seeking the release of a captured civilian prisoner, several days before the Battle of Baltimore. Key went on to write what later became the words to the American national anthem, "The Star-Spangled Banner" after watching the British attack on Baltimore's Fort McHenry. Tonnant was broken up in 1821.

== French service ==
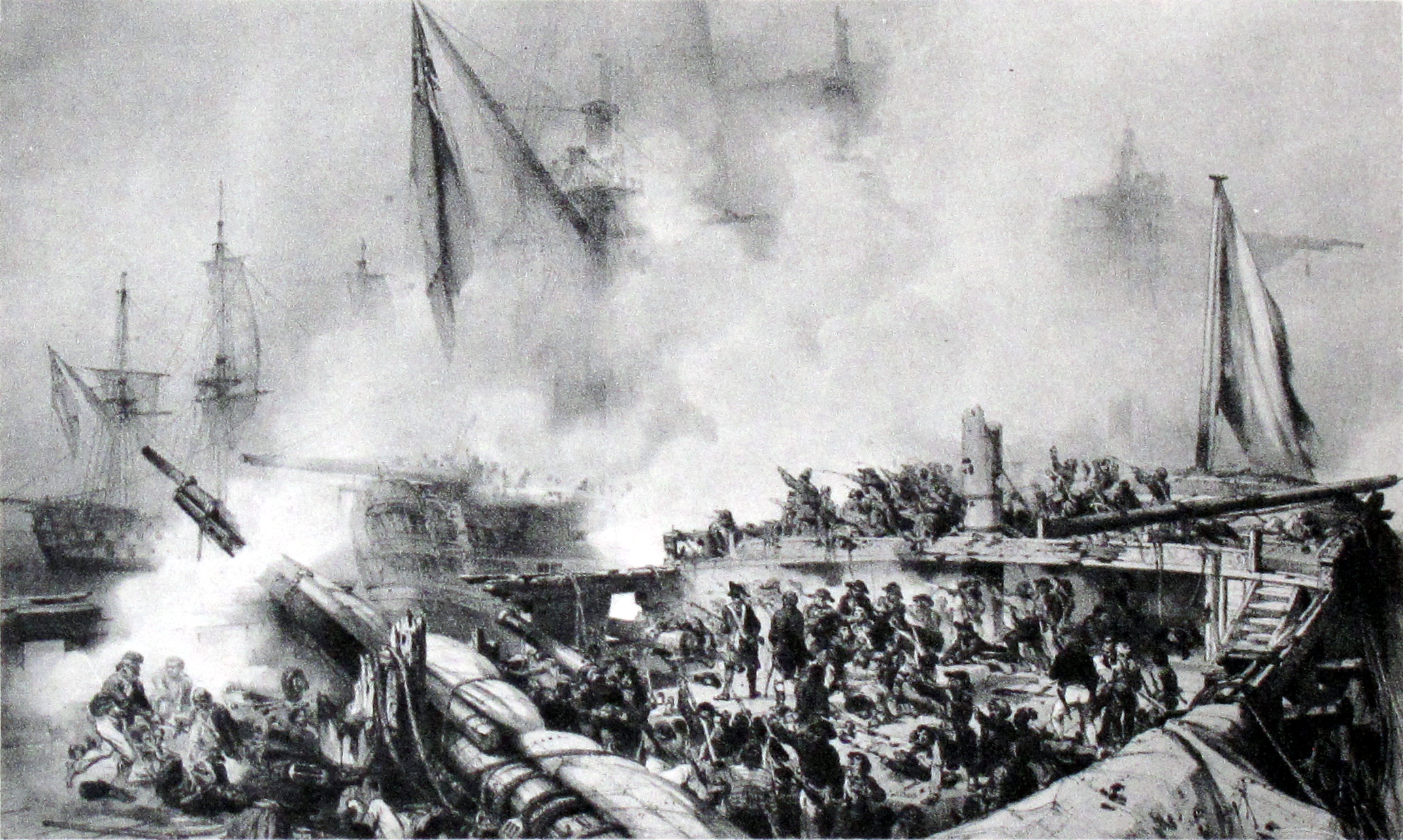
Death of Du Petit-Thouars, by Auguste Mayer

Tonnant was the lead ship in a class of 80-gun two-deckers built to a design by Jacques-Noël Sané, and ordered on 19 October 1787. She was laid down at the Toulon Dockyard in November 1787 and launched on 24 October 1789. Anglo-Spanish forces captured her there in August 1793, but left her when they withdrew in December. She then reverted to the French Navy.

Tonnant fought in the battles of Genoa on 14 March 1795 and The Nile on 1 August 1798 under Aristide Aubert Du Petit Thouars. During the battle, she severely damaged HMS Majestic, causing nearly two hundred casualties, including 50 killed and 143 wounded. Among the dead was Majestic's captain, George Blagdon Westcott. Du Petit-Thouars, who had both legs and an arm shot off, commanded his ship until he died. Tonnant was the only French ship still engaged in the morning, with her colours flying, though aground. It was not until 3 August that she finally struck her colours.

The British took her into their service, registering and naming her as HMS Tonnant on 9 December 1798. She arrived at the naval base at Plymouth, England on 17 July 1799. Even before she formally entered British service, she was among the vessels that participated in the capture of the Greek vessel Ardito on 24 October 1798.

Tonnant was commissioned under Captain Loftus Bland in January 1799, with Captain Robert Lewis Fitzgerald taking over in February. He sailed her to Gibraltar and then back to Britain. Upon her arrival in Plymouth in 1800 she was laid up in ordinary.

== British service ==
=== Napoleonic Wars ===
Tonnant underwent repairs between December 1801 and April 1803. She was commissioned in March 1803 under Captain Sir Edward Pellew. Under his command she participated in the Blockade of Ferrol.

On 24 May the cutter Resolution captured Esperance and Vigilant, with Tonnant sharing in the capture. Next, Tonnant, Mars and Spartiate captured the Dutch ships Coffee Baum and Maasluys on 2 and 4 June. Tonnant then was one of the vessels that shared in the recapture on 27 August of Lord Nelson. (Note: Pellew received £1667 10s 2 1/2d in prize money. A seaman received £2 14s 6 1/2d.)

Tonnant was part of Rear-Admiral Sir Robert Calder's squadron off Cape Ortegal when she encountered the French ships Duguay-Trouin and Guerrière on 2 September 1803. The two French Navy warships had broken out of the blockade when they met Tonnant. They escaped her but British naval forces of varying strengths harried them during their journey back to port and they only just made it to the safety of A Coruña.

Tonnant shared in the capture of Perseverance on 28 October, though the prize money was much less. (Note: Pellew received £85 12s 1d; a seaman received 3s 5 1/4d.) Then on 29 November, Ardent destroyed Bayonnoise; Tonnant was among the vessels sharing, by agreement, in the bounty money. In the new year, on 18 February 1804, Tonnant and the ships of the squadron recaptured the brig Eliza.

Later in 1804 Tonnant was in the Channel under Captain William Henry Jervis. He drowned off Brest when going in his gig from Tonnant to San Josef on 26 January 1805. Captain Charles Tyler replaced Jervis in March.

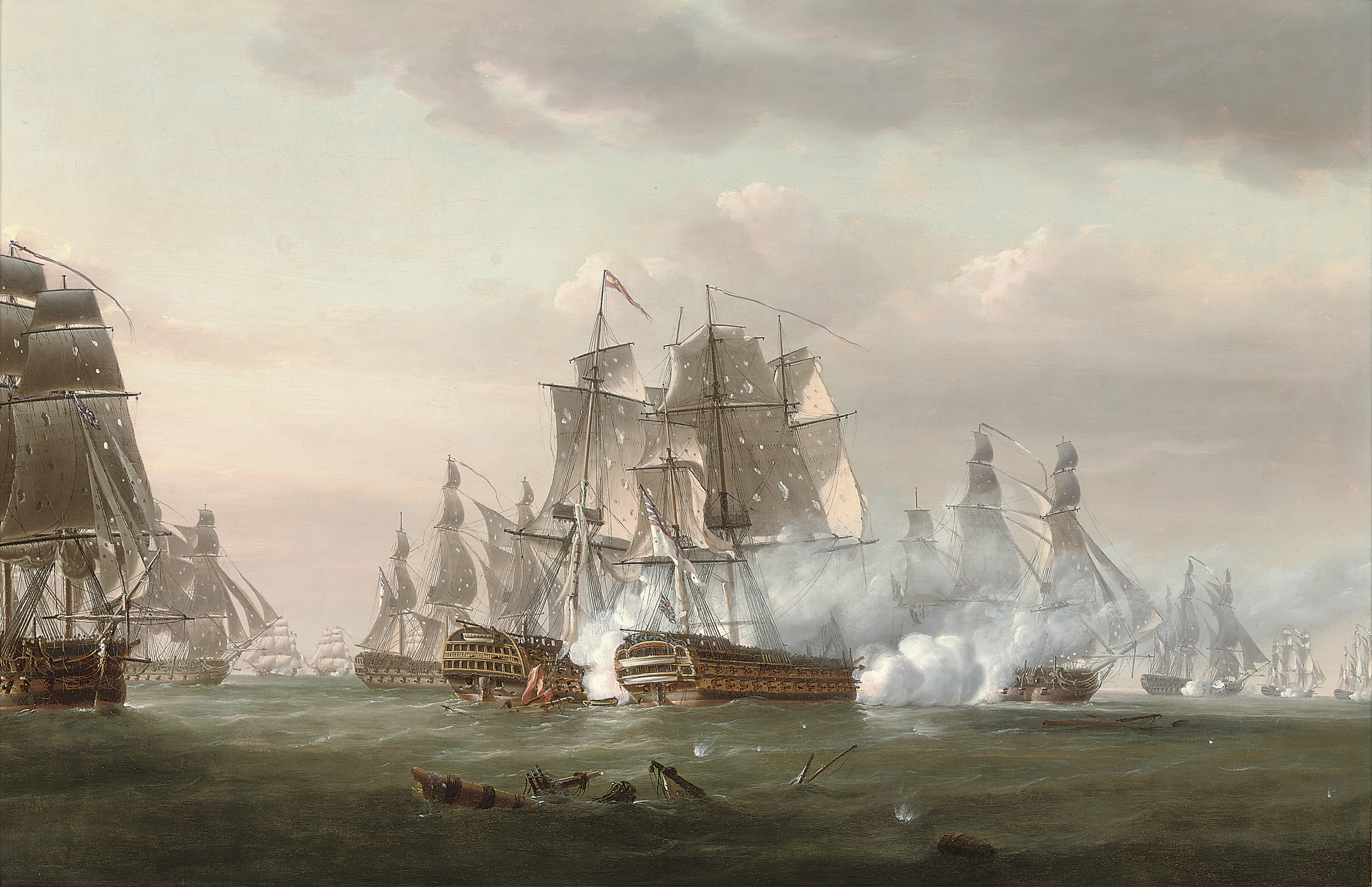
In action at Trafalgar, HMS Tonnant engaging the Spanish '74' Monarca

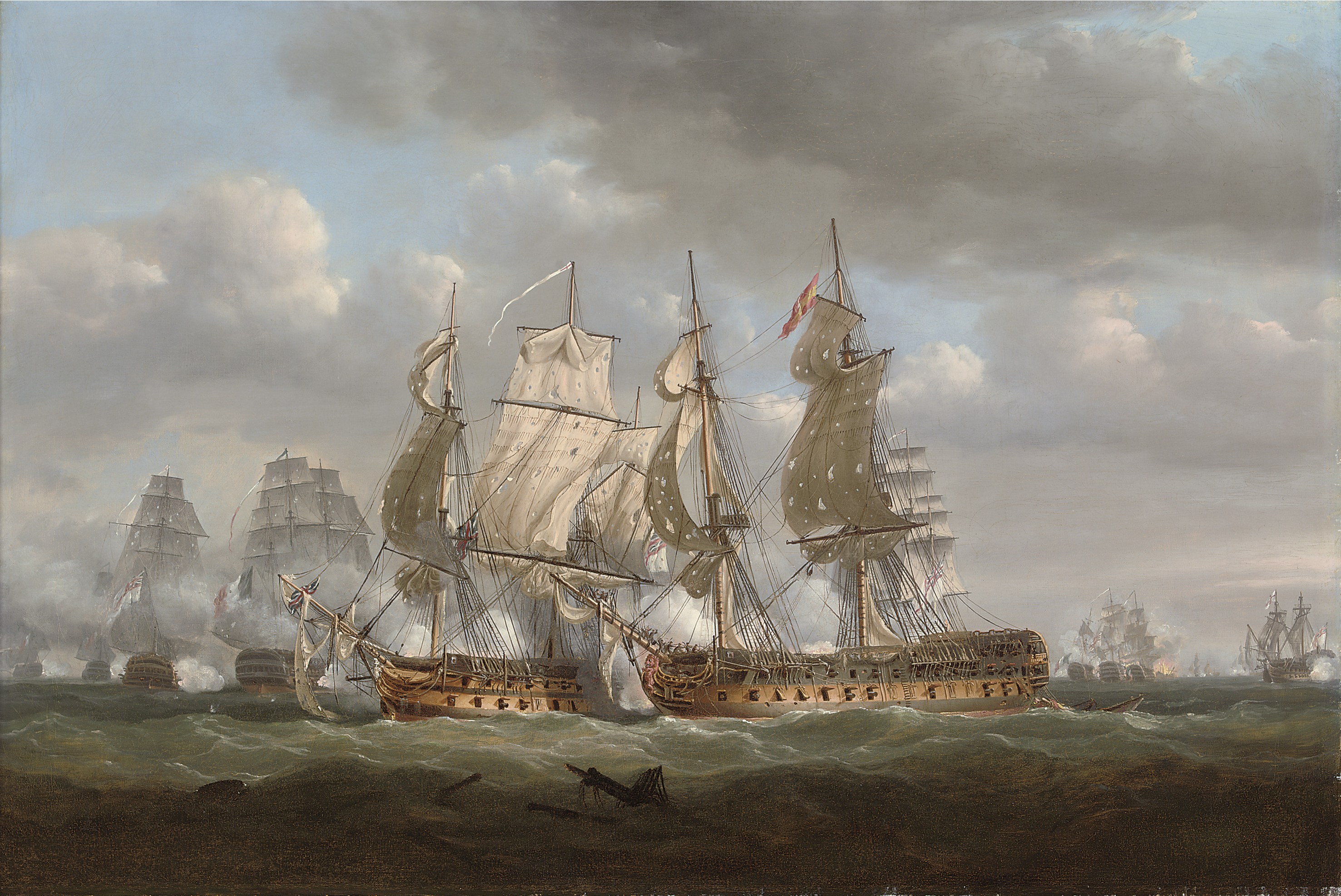
Tonnant accepting Monarca's surrender, painted by Nicholas Pocock

During the Battle of Trafalgar (21 October 1805) she captured the 74-gun Algésiras. Tonnant lost 26 officers and men killed and 50 officers and men wounded in the battle, with Tyler being among the wounded. (Note: For seamen and marines Parliament's grant for Trafalgar amounted to £4 12s 6d per capita. This represented roughly three months' wages.)

Tonnant underwent a refit at Portsmouth between January and June 1806. She was recommissioned in May under Captain Thomas Browne. She then served as flagship for Rear-Admiral Eliab Harvey. While under his command Minerva distinguished herself in a number of small cutting out expeditions.

In July 1807 she was under Captain Richard Hancock and served as flagship for Rear-Admiral Michael de Courcy. In 1809 she was under the command of Captain James Bowen when she recaptured Ann of Leith on 8 April. Tonnant then was among the vessels sharing in the captures of Goede Hoop on 9 July and Carl Ludwig on 2 August.

Between November and December 1809 she was under repair at Plymouth. In 1810 she served under Captain Sir John Gore. Lloyd's List reported on 14 June 1811 that French privateer Adolphe had captured George and Mary, but that Tonnant had recaptured George and Mary, which had been sailing from the West Indies and which arrived in Plymouth on 11 June.

On 24 March 1812, still under the command of Gore, Tonnant was off Ushant when she captured the French privateer Emilie. Emilie was armed with twelve 10-pounder guns and had a crew of 84 men. She was nine days out of Saint-Malo and had captured one vessel, a Spanish merchant ship that the Royal Navy had recaptured on the 24th. At the time that she captured Emilie, Tonnant was in company with Hogue, Colossus, Bulwark, and Poictiers. Then on 18 April Tonnant captured Martha. On 12 May, Abercrombie captured Betsy. Abercrombie was in company with Tonnant, Royal Sovereign, Queen, Pompee and Goldfinch. (Note: The capture involved many large vessels and Betsey was apparently not very valuable. The result was that the amount of prize money per seaman was only 6d, or less than half-a-day's wages.) Tonnant then again underwent repair between August and December 1812, this time at Chatham.

=== War of 1812 ===
Tonnant joined the War of 1812 late. She was fitted for sea in the first quarter of 1814, being recommissioned in January under Lord Cochrane. He was embroiled in scandal, consequently on 5 April 1814 Captain Alexander Skene was appointed Captain. (Note: Although scheduled to depart on 7 April, she set sail the following day.) She was the lead vessel in a flotilla headed to North America, which arrived at Bermuda on 7 June, disembarking a contingent of Royal Marines on 9 June 1814. Upon re-embarking the contingent of Royal Marines, Tonnant sailed for the Chesapeake on 30 June, and joined Rear Admiral Cockburn's squadron on 16 July.

On 9 June 1814 Skene was exchanged commands with Captain John Wainwright of the Asia. Wainwright was personally tasked with returning to London at the start of September 1814 to deliver the dispatch from Vice Admiral Cochrane, so on 4 September Captain Charles Kerr assumed command.

Tonnant served as the flagship for Vice Admiral Sir Alexander Cochrane from 9 June 1814 onwards. From her he directed attacks on Washington, D.C., Baltimore and then the final Battle of New Orleans from the Gulf of Mexico.

==== "Star-Spangled Banner" ====
It was aboard Tonnant near the mouth of the Potomac River, on 7 September 1814 that the Americans, Colonel John Stuart Skinner and Francis Scott Key, dined with Vice Admiral Cochrane, Major General Robert Ross, Rear Admiral Sir George Cockburn and Rear Admiral Edward Codrington. They were pleading for the release of a civilian prisoner, Dr. William Beanes. (Note: Shortly thereafter a sniper would kill Ross while Ross was leading his forces against Baltimore.) After his release, Skinner, Key and Beanes were then transferred to the frigate HMS Surprise and later allowed to return to their own truce vessel sloop, but were not allowed to return to Baltimore because they had become familiar with the strength and position of British units and knew of the British intention to attack Baltimore. As a result, Key witnessed the bombarding of Fort McHenry (September 13 and 14) and was inspired to write a poem called Defence of Fort M'Henry, later named "The Star-Spangled Banner". During the bombardment, HMS Erebus provided the "rockets red glare" whilst HMS Meteor (along with four other bomb vessels) provided the "bombs bursting in air" that feature in the lyrics.

==== The body of Major General Ross ====
After Major General Robert Ross's death in the Battle of North Point, his body was stored in a barrel of 129 gallons (586 L) of Jamaican rum aboard Tonnant. When she was diverted to New Orleans for the forthcoming battle (see below), the body was later shipped on the British ship Royal Oak to Halifax, Nova Scotia, where his body was interred on 29 September 1814 in the Old Burying Ground.

==== New Orleans ====
The Tonnant arrived at Jamaica on 18 November 1814. On 29 November, the fleet departed Jamaica, the vessels being led by the Tonnant The Tonnant was moored off on Apalachicola on 3 December, then moored off Pensacola on 7 December. Tonnant continued to serve Cochrane as a flagship when he directed the British naval forces at the Battle of New Orleans. Immediately before the battle, ship's boats from Tonnant participated in the British victory at the Battle of Lake Borgne.

On 8 December 1814, two US gunboats fired on Sophie, Armide and the sixth-rate frigate Seahorse while they were passing the chain of small islands that runs parallel to the shore between Mobile and Lake Borgne.

Between 12 and 15 December 1814, Captain Lockyer of Sophie led a flotilla of 42 boats, barges, launches and 3 unarmed gigs to attack the US gunboats. Lockyer drew his flotilla from the fleet that was massing against New Orleans, including the 74-gun third rates Royal Oak and Tonnant, and a number of other vessels including Armide, Seahorse, Manly and Meteor. (Note: The 'Names of Ships for which Claims have been proved' are as follows: warships Tonnant, Norge, Royal Oak, Ramillies, Bedford, Armide, Cydnus, Trave, Seahorse, Sophie, and Meteor; troopships Gorgon, Diomede, Alceste, and Belle Poule.)

Lockyer deployed the boats in three divisions, of which he led one. Captain Montresor of the gun-brig Manly commanded the second, and Captain Roberts of Meteor commanded the third. After rowing for 36 hours, the British met the Americans at St. Joseph's Island. On 13 December 1814, the British attacked the one-gun schooner USS Sea Horse. On the morning of 14 December, the British engaged the Americans in a short, violent battle. One longboat from Tonnant, commanded by Lieutenant James Barnwell Tattnall grappled the largest gunboat and was sunk, its boarding party transferred to the other ships' boats.

The British captured the American flotilla, comprising the tender, USS Alligator, and five gunboats. The British lost 17 men killed and 77 wounded; Tonnant had three men killed and 15 wounded, one of whom died later. Anaconda then evacuated the wounded. In 1821 the survivors of the flotilla shared in the distribution of head-money arising from the capture of the American gunboats and sundry bales of cotton. (Note: A first-class share of the prize money was worth £34 12s 9 1/4d; a sixth-class share, that of an ordinary seaman, was worth 7s 10 3/4d.) In 1847 the Admiralty issued a clasp (or bar) marked "14 Dec. Boat Service 1814" to survivors of the boat service who claimed the clasp to the Naval General Service Medal.

Tonnant was off New Orleans in January 1815, and in the vicinity of the attack on Fort Bowyer in February 1815. She left the anchorage off Mobile Bay on 18 February and arrived in Havana on 24 February 1815, accompanied by Asia and Vengeur. The Tonnant reported to be at Bermuda as of 20 March 1815. (Note: The Bacchante and Pomone sailed on the 21st [March from Bermuda] for Halifax. One of these ships was to bring Admiral Griffith from Halifax to Bermuda, to relieve Sir Alexander Cochrane, who was preparing to quit the island in the Tonnant, for England.) (Note: Admiral Griffith, who had been appointed to succeed Sir A. Cochrane in the command in North America, arrived in the Pomone, Sir Alexander, (who [at the time of publication] has since arrived at Portsmouth), was to sail in the Tonnant about the 15th [April] for England, and the Dragon, Severn, Brune, Melpomene, Regulus, and Dominica, then lying at Bermuda, were expected to return home with him.) Tonnant returned to England in May 1815. Cochrane transferred his pennant to the Puissant on 15 May 1815.

=== Post-war and fate ===
Captain Charles Kerr ceased to command her on 5 June 1815. Captain John Tailour assumed command in November. From June 1815 onwards she was the Flagship of Rear-Admiral Sir Benjamin Hallowell on the Cork station.

Tonnant was paid off into ordinary in November 1818. She was broken up at Plymouth in March 1821.

== See also ==
- List of ships captured in the 18th century
- Glossary of nautical terms (A-L)
- Glossary of nautical terms (M-Z)
