= French frigate Trave =

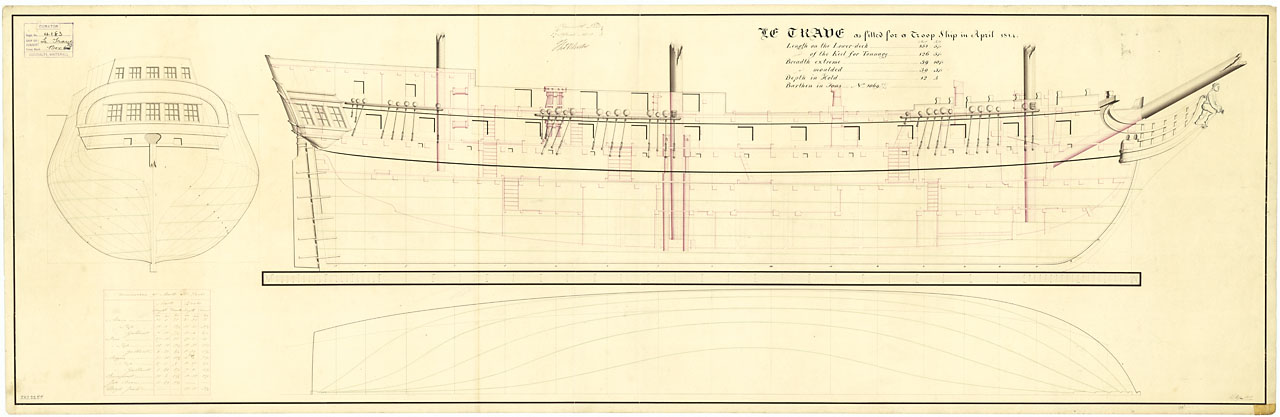
- Trave

History

France
- Name: Trave
- Namesake: Trave River
- Builder: Amsterdam
- Laid down: April 1811
- Launched: 12 May 1812

United Kingdom
- Name: HMS Trave
- Acquired: October 1813 by capture
- Honours and awards: Naval General Service Medal with clasp "14 Dec. Boat Service 1814"
- Fate: Sold 7 June 1821

General characteristics
- Class & type: Pallas-class frigate
- Tons burthen: 1069 26/94 tons (bm)
- Length: 151 ft 5 1/4 in (46.2 m) (overall); 16 ft 5 1/8 in (5.0 m) (keel)
- Beam: 39 ft 10 1/2 in (12.2 m)
- Depth of hold: 12 ft 4 in (3.8 m)
- Sail plan: ship
- Complement: 320 (at capture)
- Armament: French service: Upper deck: 28 × 18-pounder long guns; QD: 14 × 18-pounder carronades; Fc: 2 × 18-pounder carronades + 2 × 9-pounder chase guns

The French frigate Trave was a Pallas-class frigate of the French Navy, launched at Amsterdam in 1812. After the Royal Navy captured her in 1813 in the North Sea, it took her into service as the troopship HMS Trave. She served in the Potomac and her boats participated in the Battle of Lake Borgne during the War of 1812. She was sold on 7 June 1821.

== Capture ==
On 30 September 1813, Trave and Weser left the Texel to cruise the Western Islands. However, on 16 October, a gale dismasted both, and separated them. On 21 October, the ship of the line HMS Rippon, and the brigs HMS Royalist and HMS Scylla captured Weser.

That same day the brig HMS Achates encountered Trave and the two exchanged fire that wounded two men aboard Trave. However, Trave was able to extricate herself from the engagement.

The next day Trave was less fortunate. On 23 October, Andromache captured Trave after an engagement of only 15 minutes. Trave, having lost her masts in the storm, was sailing under jury-rigged masts and so unable to maneuver. She was armed with twenty-eight French 18-pounder long guns and sixteen 18-pounder carronades, and had a crew of 321 men, almost all Dutch. Before she struck she had one man killed, and 28 men wounded, including her commander capitaine de frégate Jacob Van Maren, Chevalier de l'Ordre Impérial de la Réunion. Andromache had little damage and only two men wounded. At the time of the capture the ketch HMS Gleaner was in sight, though it is not clear what she could have added had the engagement lasted longer. More importantly, the frigate Eurotas was also in sight as Trave struck.

== HMS Trave ==
The Royal Navy took Trave into service as HMS Trave. Commander Rowland Money was appointed to command her in April. Between March and May she was at Portsmouth being fitted as a troopship and armed en flûte. He then carried elements of the 4th regiment of Foot from the river Garonne to North America. Trave was part of a fleet of some dozen warships and several transports that was carrying Major-General Ross and some 2500 men from three regiments to invade North America. The naval commander was Rear-Admiral Pulteney Malcolm in Royal Oak. The fleet left on 2 June, stopped in at St Michels, in the Azores, and arrived at Bermuda 24 July. The fleet left on 4 August and by 20 August was in the Patuxent River.

The British, under the command of Admiral Sir Alexander Cochrane then moved up the Patuxent on 20 August, preparing for a landing at Benedict. Money commanded one of the three divisions of boats carrying the fleet's marines and their artillery. The United States's Secretary of the Navy Jones had ordered Commodore Joshua Barney to take his Chesapeake Bay Flotilla as far up the Patuxent as possible, to Queen Anne, and scuttle it if the British appeared. Leaving his barges with a skeleton crew under the command of Lieutenant Solomon Kireo Frazier to handle any destruction of the craft, Barney took the majority of his men to join the American Army commanded by General William Henry Winder. Frazier scuttled all but one of the vessels, which the British captured, of the Chesapeake Bay Flotilla. In 1835 there was a payment of prize money to Trave's crew, and those of numerous other British vessels, for "the capture of the Chesapeake." (Note: A first-class share was worth £3 18s 0d; a sixth-class share, that of an ordinary seaman, was worth 6d., "No. 19255". The London Gazette. 3 April 1835. p. 644. The amounts were a dividend from the estate of the late agent Henry Abbott, who had gone bankrupt.)

On 24 August the British moved towards Washington, DC. Money caught up with the army the evening before, bringing with him the naval brigade and the marine's artillery. The British defeated the Americans at the Battle of Bladensburg. They then entered Washington unopposed and set fire to many of the government buildings in what became known as the Burning of Washington.

On 30 August the British re-embarked on their vessels at Benedict, and on 9 September sailed to Baltimore. On 12 September Money commanded one of the naval brigades that landed at North Point. He apparently participated in the battle of North Point.

From Baltimore Trave sailed to New Orleans where her boats participated in the battle of Lake Borgne.

The British captured five gunboats and took them into service under the names Ambush (or Ambush No. 5), Firebrand, HMS Destruction, Harlequin, and Eagle. (Note: A first-class share of the prize money was worth £34 12s 9 1/4d; a sixth-class share, that of an ordinary seaman, was worth 7s 10 3/4d.) In 1847 the Admiralty issued a clasp (or bar) marked "14 Dec. Boat Service 1814" to survivors of the boat service who claimed the clasp to the Naval General Service Medal. (Note: The 'Names of Ships for which Claims have been proved' are as follows: warships Tonnant, Norge, Royal Oak, Ramillies, Bedford, Armide, Cydnus, Trave, Seahorse, Sophie, and Meteor; troopships Gorgon, Diomede, Alceste, and Belle Poule.)

On 8 January 1815, during the battle of New Orleans, Money commanded the naval contingent in Lieutenant-colonel Thornton's brigade, which carried out a successful attack on the American position on the western bank of the Mississippi. Unfortunately, Money was severely wounded in the attack.

Because Commander Money was badly wounded, Admiral Cochrane sent him home to Britain. In March 1815 Commander William C.C. Kent (acting), or Captain John Boulton, took command of Trave. She returned to Portsmouth on 17 May 1815. Commander John Codd replaced Kent on 13 June, or 13 November 1815.

== Fate ==
Trave arrived at Plymouth in July 1816 and the Admiralty placed her in Ordinary. She was sold on 7 June 1821 to Mr. Holmes for £2,100 for breaking up.
