= HMS Manly (1812) =

Brig of the Royal Navy

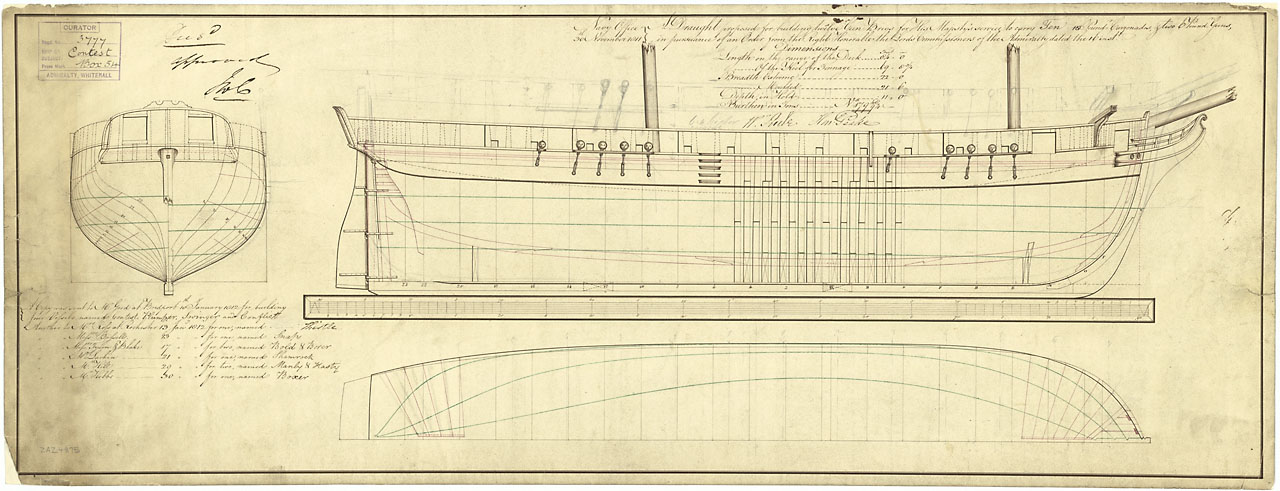
- Manly

History

United Kingdom
- Name: HMS Manly
- Ordered: 16 November 1811
- Builder: Thomas Hills, Sandwich
- Laid down: February 1812
- Launched: 13 July 1812
- Completed: By 24 September 1812
- Honours and awards: Naval general Service Medal with clasp "14 Dec. Boat Service 1814"
- Fate: Sold on 12 December 1833

General characteristics
- Class & type: Bold-class gun-brig
- Tons burthen: 18160/94 (bm)
- Length: Overall: 84 ft 1 in (25.6 m); Keel: 70 ft 0 1/4 in (21.3 m)
- Beam: 22 ft 1 in (6.7 m)
- Depth of hold: 11 ft 1/4 in (3.359 m)
- Sail plan: Brig
- Complement: 60
- Armament: 10 × 18-pounder carronades + 2 × 6-pounder bow chasers

HMS Manly was a 12-gun Bold-class gun-brig of the Royal Navy, launched in 1812. She served in the War of 1812, her boats participating in the Battle of Lake Borgne. She was sold in 1833.

== Active service ==
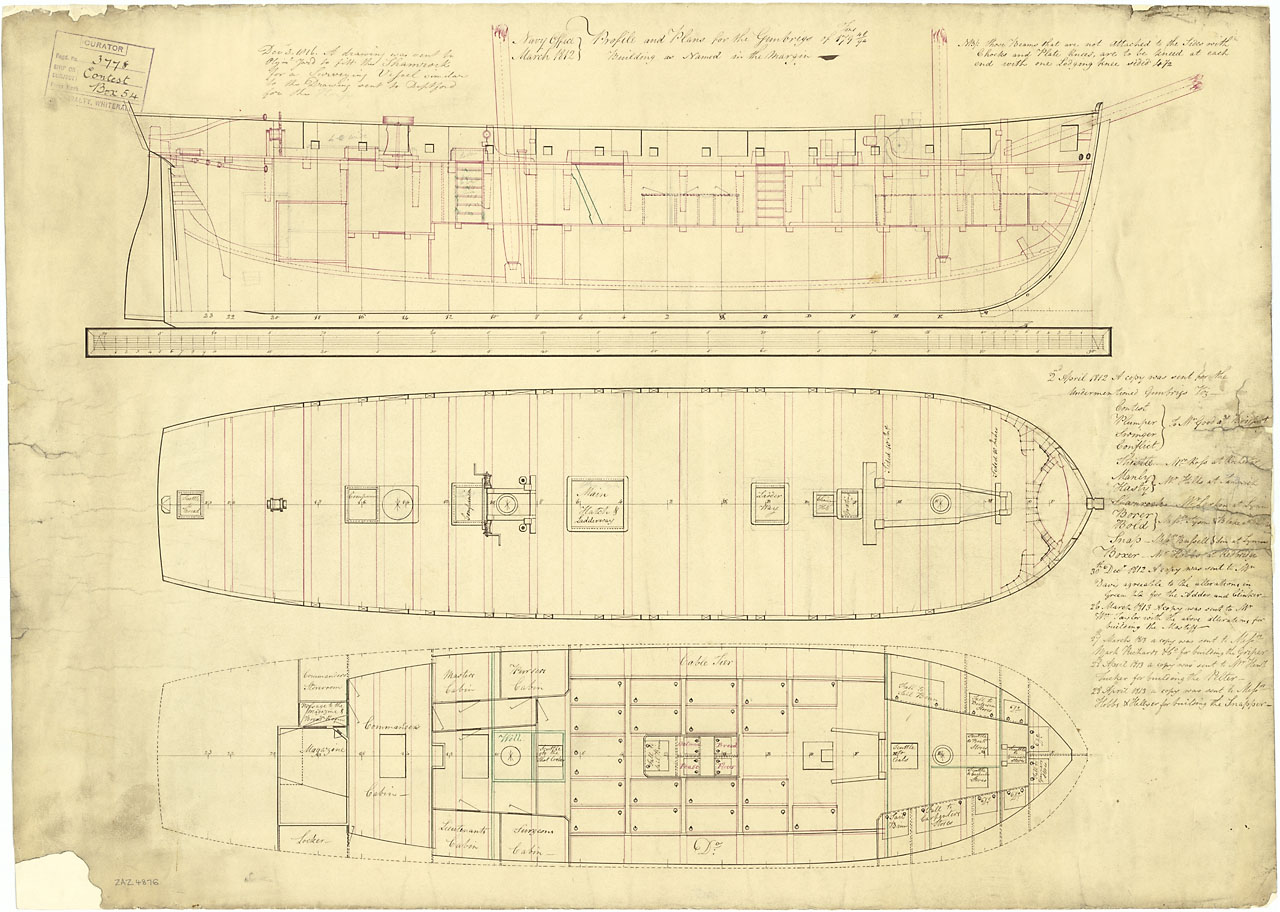
Plan showing the inboard profile, upper deck, and lower deck with hold for Manly

Commissioned initially under Commander Edward Collier, she left Deal on 27 December 1812 and sailed to the Scheldt.

On 23 March 1813, Manly sailed to the Americas. There in June she chased, but lost, the privateer Young Teazer.

In the summer of 1813 Manly captured Flor de Jago, of 164 tons, sailing from Lisbon to Boston. Then on 2 August she captured the brig Hope, sailing from Batavia to Providence. Manly was stranded at Halifax on 13 November 1813 but was salved after incessant labor over three weeks.

In early January 1814, Collier and his crew volunteered to reinforce the squadron on the Great Lakes, together with men from Fantome and Thistle. Seventy men left Halifax; they reached Kingston, Ontario on 22 March, having traveled some 900 miles in winter, almost entirely on foot.

After Collier left, Lieutenant Vincent Newton took command of Manly. In May he was promoted to Commander, but remained with her. On 17 August 1814, Vice-Admiral Alexander Cochrane detached Devastation, Euryalus, Manly, Ætna, Meteor and HMS Erebus, all under Captain Alexander Gordon in Seahorse, to go up the Potomac and bombard Fort Washington, which was on the left bank of the river, some ten or twelve miles below Washington itself. The squadron, without Manly destroyed shipping on the Potomac on 17 August. They then sailed up the Potomac to bombard Fort Washington while Vice-Admiral Alexander Cochrane landed the army at Benedict, Maryland on the Patuxent River on 19 and 20 August.

On 20 August the 40-gun fourth rate Endymion-class frigate Severn, the frigate Hebrus and Manly sailed up the Patuxent River to follow the boats as far as possible. Cochrane and his force of marines and seamen entered Washington on the night of 24 August. The British then burnt the White House, the Treasury and the War Office. They left at 9 o'clock in the evening of the next day and returned to Nottingham, Maryland on the Patuxent where Cochrane boarded Manly. The campaign cost the Navy one man killed and six wounded, including one man of the Corps of Colonial Marines killed, and three wounded. (Note: Prize-money arising from the booty captured by the expedition in the River Patuxent, at Fort Washington, and Alexandria, between 22 and 29 August 1814 was paid in November 1817. A first-class share was worth £183 9s 1 3/4d; a sixth-class share, which was what an ordinary seaman would receive, was worth £1 9s 3 1/2d. A second and final payment came in May 1819. A first-class share was worth £42 13s 10 3/4d; a sixth-class share was worth 9s 1 3/4d.)

=== Battle of Lake Borgne ===
Commander Henry Montresor took command after Manly was sent to the Gulf of Mexico. In early December 1814, a British fleet massed for the assault on New Orleans. Between 12 and 15 December 1814, Captain Nicholas Lockyer of HMS Sophie led a flotilla of 45 boats, barges, lunches, and gigs to attack the US gunboats. He drew his flotilla from the fleet that was massing against New Orleans, including the 74-gun third-rate Tonnant, Armide, Seahorse, Manly, and Meteor. Lockyer deployed the rowboats in three divisions, of which he led one. Commander Montresor of the Manly commanded the second, and Captain Samuel Roberts of Meteor commanded the third. After rowing for 36 hours, the British faced off against the Americans at St. Joseph's Island. On the morning of the 14th, the British engaged the Americans in the short, violent Battle of Lake Borgne. The British captured the entire American force, five gunboats and the tender, USS Alligator. The British lost 17 men killed and 77 wounded; Manly fortunately had no casualties. Anaconda then evacuated the wounded.

Lockyer was promoted to Post Captain on 29 March 1815, and Montresor and Roberts were promoted to post captain on 13 June. Montresor was also nominated as a Companion of the Order of the Bath on 4 June. In 1821 the survivors of the flotilla shared in the distribution of head-money arising from the capture of the American gun-boats and sundry bales of cotton. (Note: A first-class share of the prize money was worth £34 12s 9 1/4d; a sixth-class share, that of an ordinary seaman, was worth 7s 10 3/4d.) In 1847 the Admiralty issued a clasp (or bar) for the Naval General Service Medal marked "14 Dec. Boat Service 1814" to survivors of the battle that wanted to claim it.

After Montresor received his promotion to post-captain, Commander George Truscott took command of Manly in early 1815. Following the peace, Manly landed Mr Williamson of Albion, the purveyor of the squadron, at Savannah, Georgia in April to buy provisions. He found that trade had reverted to normal. Manly later sailed from Wilmington, North Carolina to Bermuda and then back home. Commander Charles Simione replaced Truscott in June 1815.

=== Post-war career ===
In February 1824 Manly was fitted with iron and zinc on the bottom "for an experiment to preserve the copper".

Manly was in ordinary (reserve) in Portsmouth in 1826, and then fitted for sea between October 1826 and May 1827. She was recommissioned in February 1827 under Lieutenant William Field for the Halifax station.

She remained on the Halifax station into the early 1830s. In June 1828 Lieutenant H. W. Bishop assumed command. His replacement in October 1830 was Lieutenant John Wheatley.

== Fate ==
Manly was sold out of the service in 1833 to Sturge for £550.
