= HMS Sophie (1809) =

Brig-sloop of the Royal Navy

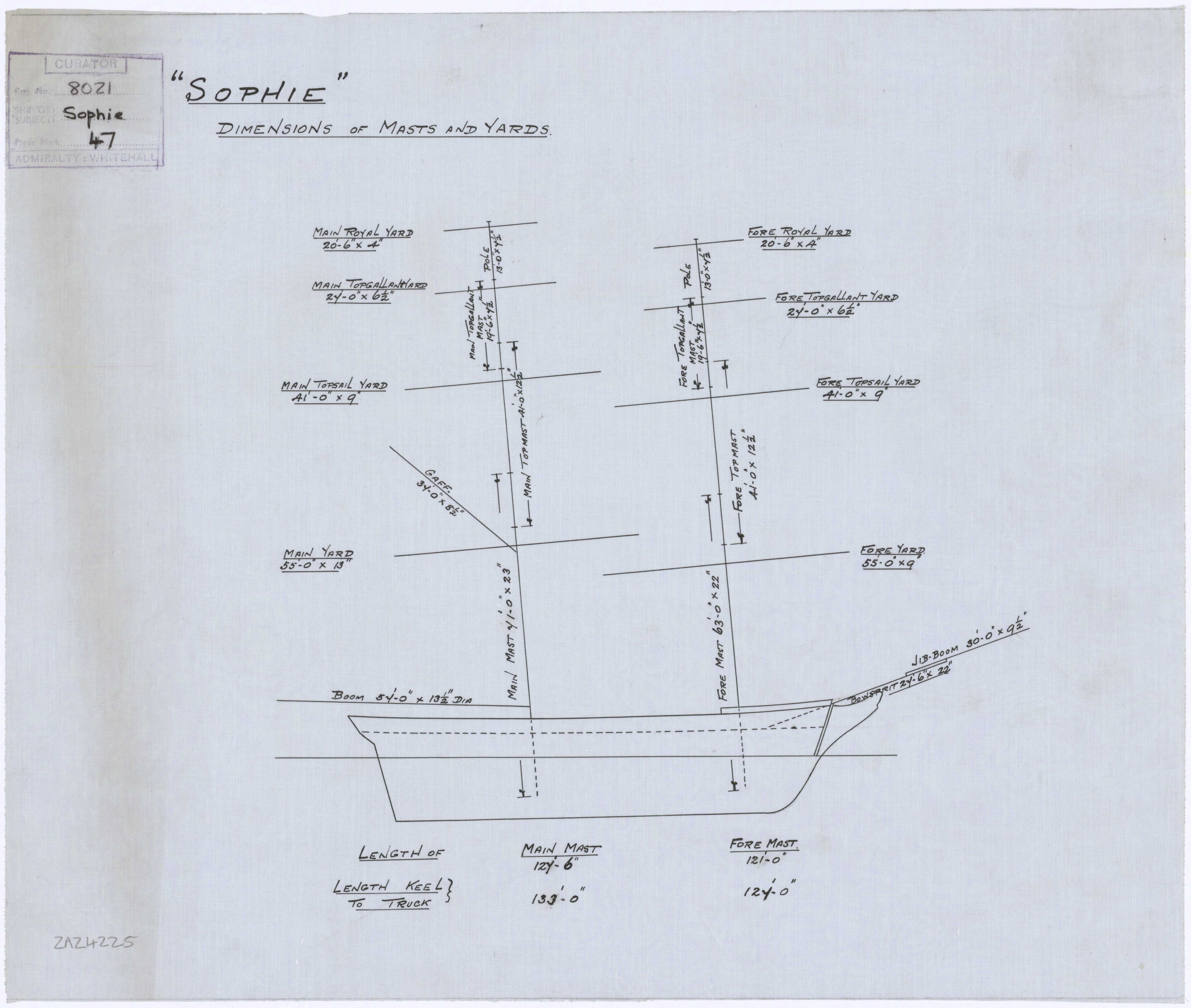
- A profile plan showing the dimensions of masts and yards for Sophie

History

United Kingdom
- Name: HMS Sophie
- Ordered: 21 November 1808
- Builder: John Pelham, Frindsbury
- Laid down: December 1808
- Launched: 8 September 1809
- Completed: By 23 December 1809
- Fate: Sold on 15 August 1825

General characteristics
- Class & type: 18-gun Cruizer class brig-sloop
- Tons burthen: 38740/94 (bm)
- Length: 100 ft 3 in (30.6 m) (overall); 77 ft 3 1/2 in (23.6 m) (keel)
- Beam: 30 ft 8 in (9.3 m)
- Depth of hold: 12 ft 9 in (3.9 m)
- Propulsion: Sails
- Sail plan: Brig-sloop
- Complement: 121
- Armament: 16 × 32-pounder carronades; 2 × 6-pounder bow guns

HMS Sophie was an 18-gun Cruizer class brig-sloop of the Royal Navy. She served during the Napoleonic Wars and the War of 1812. During the War of 1812 Sophie participated in the economic war against American trade, capturing or destroying numerous small merchant vessels, and in an unsuccessful attack on Fort Bowyer, Alabama. Later, she moved to the East Indies where she served in the First Anglo-Burmese War. The Admiralty sold Sophie in 1825.

== Construction and commissioning ==
Plan for the Sophie

Sophie was launched and completed in 1809. She commissioned under Commander Nicholas Lockyer in October that year Lockyer was to command her for the next five years.

Initially, Sophie served out of Portsmouth. On 30 November 1810 Sophie recaptured the ship Fountain, which a privateer had captured. Fountain, Walker, master, had been sailing from Quebec to Lynn. She arrived at Ramsgate on 1 December.

== War of 1812 ==
On 14 August Sophie accompanied Admiral Sir John Borlase Warren, who was sailing to Halifax, Nova Scotia, on San Domingo, together with Poictiers, Magnet, and Mackerel. Magnet disappeared during the voyage and was presumed foundered with all hands. Sophie went on to have an active career taking prizes and operating against American privateers during the War of 1812.

=== Prize taking ===
On 10 May 1812 Sophie was in company with North Star when they captured Brick.

On 31 August Sophie captured the merchant vessel Alexander, and on 25 November the brig Experience from Rio and bound for Boston. Sophie sent Experience (or Experiment) into Bermuda.

On 11 December Sophie took the schooner Fanny and Maria and the ship Cyrus, and on 16 December the schooner Eagle and the brig Little Arnold. The American privateer Revenge had captured Cyrus, Donaldson, master, on 17 November as she was sailing from Newfoundland to Jamaica. With Maidstone, Sophie captured the Mary Ann, sailing from Philadelphia to Charleston.

Her success continued the following year, when in January 1813 she made prizes of the schooners Polly Merrick from Norfolk and George Washington from Windsor, both bound for New York. Together with Aeolus she captured the American vessels Jacob Getting, with a cargo of rice and corn, on 18 February, Elizabeth, with a cargo of cotton, on 24 February, the Federal Jack, with a cargo of "lighthouses", on 2 March, and the Spanish ship Anna, with a cargo of flour and bread, on 9 March. On 10 May North Star and Sophie captured the Brick.

On 22 June Sophie captured the letter of marque Amelia. Late in 1812 or early in 1813, Sophie shared in the capture of the schooner Spencer.

While stationed in the Chesapeake in 1813, as part of a squadron under Captain Barrie in the 74-gun third-rate Dragon, Sophie participated in several cutting out expeditions in the Potomac. On 27 October boats from Dragon and Sophie burnt a brigantine of 110 tons. On 30 October, boats from the two British ships burnt a schooner. That same day they also captured the Two Brothers, of 70 tons and three men. After removing her cargo, the British burnt her. The next day the British captured the schooner Gannet, of 36 tons and two men, which they also burnt. That same day they captured the schooner Minerva, of 29 tons and three men. Here too they removed the cargo before burning the vessel.

In November, boats from Dragon and Sophie, under Lieutenant Pedlar of Dragon, brought out, without loss, three American vessels from a creek in the Potomac. Then between 6 and 19 November, Sophie burned two schooners, captured one sloop, and burned another. On 14 November she captured the Frankling, of 12 tons and two men, sailing from New York to South Carolina. Three days later she burnt a brig of 50 tons. Then she burnt a sloop off Smith's Island.

Between 22 and 28 November she joined forces with Acteon to destroy two schooners and a sloop and capture three schooners and two sloops. All these vessels were coasters. The first was the New York, of 28 tons and four men. Then came the Phoebe, of 48 tons and five men. Next came the sloop Caroline, of 45 tons and five men. The fourth was the schooner Fredricksburgh, of 38 tons and two men. The fifth and sixth were the sloop Polly and the schooner Peggy, both of which they burnt. The seventh was the schooner Lucy and Sally, of 48 tons and four men, sailing from Fredericksburgh to Onnacohe. The last was the schooner Poor Jack, of 26 tons and three men, also sailing from Fredericksburgh to Onnacohe.

Sophie shared, with a number of other vessels, in the prize money for the Regulator, captured on 22 November. On 25 November, Sophie captured the brig Experience, sailing from Rio de Janeiro to Boston.

In December, Sophie, again working with Acteon, destroyed or captured seven small prizes. On 11 December they burnt a schooner of 37 tons. The next day they captured the 76-ton schooner Erie and its crew of nine men. (The Erie, under the command of John Hearn, had been sailing from Havana to Baltimore with a cargo of sugar and coffee. The British unloaded the cargo and afterwards sent it to Bermuda, thereafter employing Erie as a tender to the British squadron in the Chesapeake. There Erie too captured several prizes.) Still on 12 December, Sophie and Acteon burnt two small schooners, one of 25 and one of 60 tons. Then on the 16th they burnt the Little Elenea, of 59 tons and two men, sailing from Charleston to Baltimore. On the same day they also burnt a 69-ton sloop. The next day Sophie burnt the Antelope, also of 69 tons and also sailing from Charleston to Baltimore. In addition, Sophie and a number of other vessels shared in the prize money for the capture of the brigs George and Betsey, both taken on 23 December.

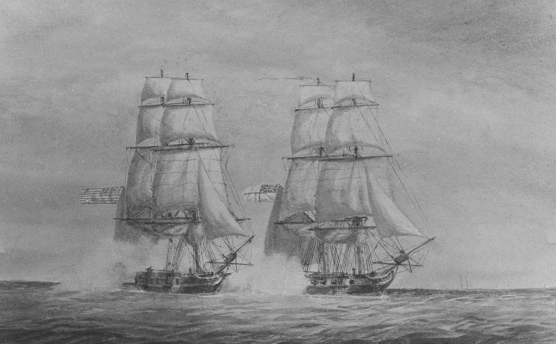
American Privateer Pioneer taken by HMS Sophie, 1812

By 26 December 1813 Sophie was operating in company with the 36-gun fifth rate frigate Maidstone, and together they captured the merchant vessel Mary Ann, sailing from Philadelphia to Charleston. On 31 December, Sophie burnt the privateer Pioneer in the Chesapeake. Pioneer, of 320 tons burthen, was armed with 17 guns and had a crew of 170 men. She was out of Baltimore, on a cruise. (Note: In July 1827 head money for the 170 men on Pioneer was paid to Sophie's crew. A first-class share was worth £180 11s 8d; a sixth-class share was worth £2 7s 3 3/4.)

On 24 April 1814 Sophie captured the American privateer Starks. Starks was armed with two guns and had a crew of 25 men. She was 24 days out of Wilmington but had not taken any prizes.

=== Mobile ===
At the beginning of August 1814 Sophie sailed to Pensacola, carrying brevet Captain Woodbine to meet with friendly Indians whom the Americans had driven into Spanish territory. On 23 August Sophie and Hermes, the Hon. William Henry Percy commanding, landed a detachment of troops under Lieutenant-Colonel Edward Nicolls to fortify Fort San Miguel. The troops landed and hoisted the British flag alongside the Spanish. Henry only did this after having received a letter from the Spanish governor in Pensacola requesting British help.

Six days later, Captain Percy sent Lockyer and Sophie to Barataria Bay to meet with the Indians and freebooters there to try to enlist them as allies in return for which they would be considered British subjects and would get lands in His Majesty's colonies assigned to them. Jean Lafitte, their leader, feigned interest but then passed the proposals on to the Governor of Louisiana while offering his services to the Americans.

Sophie was one of the four British ships that conducted the first and unsuccessful British attack on Fort Bowyer at Mobile Point on 15 September 1814. Sophie and Hermes were in the proximity of the fort, the HMS Carron and HMS Childers were moored 'a great distance' further away. The Sophie was compromised by 'defective equipment'. The Sophie had 6 killed and 16 wounded, and Hermes had 25 killed, 5 mortally wounded and 19 wounded, and was herself blown up. Their defeat caused the British to overestimate the defences at Mobile and decide to move against New Orleans instead.

In a case of mistaken identity on his maps, Lossing erroneously plots Anaconda with Sophie in September 1814, but this is factually incorrect as it was Childers that was there.

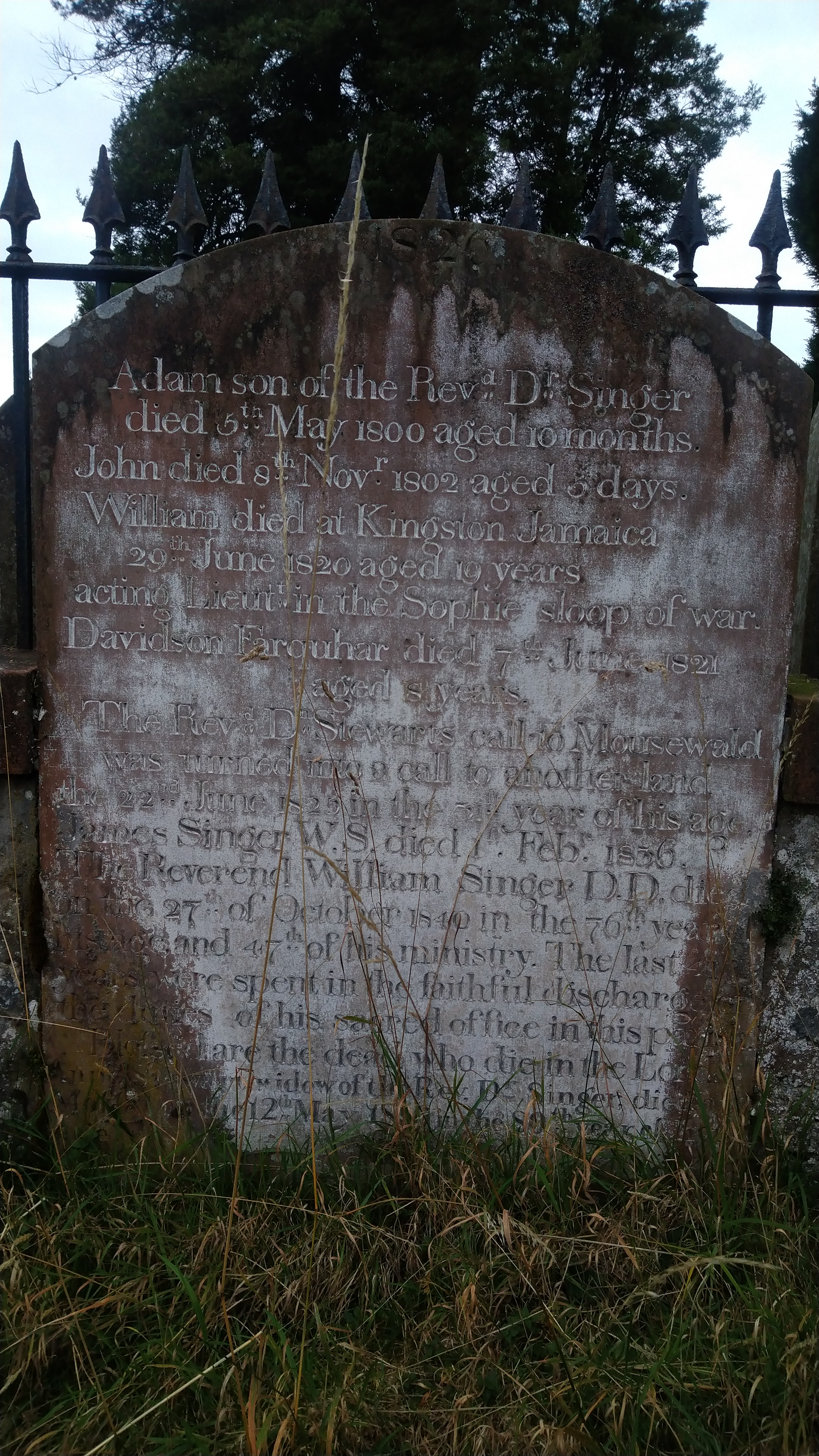
Gravestone of member of the crew serving in 1820

=== Battle of Lake Borgne ===
On 8 December 1814, two US gunboats fired on Sophie, Armide and the sixth-rate frigate Seahorse while they were passing the chain of small islands that runs parallel to the shore between Mobile and Lake Borgne.

Between 12 and 15 December 1814, Lockyer led a flotilla of some 50 boats, barges, gigs and launches to attack the US gunboats. Lockyer drew his flotilla from the fleet that was massing against New Orleans, including the 74-gun Third Rate Tonnant, Armide, Seahorse, Manly and Meteor.

Lockyer deployed the rowboats in three divisions, of which he led one. Captain Montresor of the gun-brig Manly commanded the second, and Captain Roberts of Meteor commanded the third. After rowing for 36 hours, the British met the Americans at St. Joseph's Island. On 13 December 1814, the British attacked the one-gun schooner USS Sea Horse. On the morning of the 14th, the British engaged the Americans in a short, violent battle.

The British captured the entire American force; the tender, USS Alligator, and five gunboats. The British lost 17 men killed and 77 wounded; Sophie's only casualty was Lockyer, who was badly wounded. Anaconda then evacuated the wounded. In 1821 the survivors of the flotilla shared in the distribution of head-money arising from the capture of the American gun-boats and sundry bales of cotton. (Note: A first-class share of the prize money was worth £34 12s 9 1/4d; a sixth-class share, that of an ordinary seaman, was worth 7s 10 3/4d.) In 1847 the Admiralty issued a clasp (or bar) marked "14 Dec. Boat Service 1814" to survivors of the boat service who claimed the clasp to the Naval General Service Medal. (Note: The 'Names of Ships for which Claims have been proved' are as follows: warships Tonnant, Norge, Royal Oak, Ramillies, Bedford, Armide, Cydnus, Trave, Seahorse, Sophie, and Meteor; troopships Gorgon, Diomede, Alceste, and Belle Poule.)

=== New Orleans ===
In yet another case of mistaken identity on his maps, Lossing erroneously plots Sophie in the Mississippi alongside HMS Herald in January 1815, but this is factually incorrect as it was HMS Thistle that was there. Remini makes the same error too, and reclassifies her as a bomb vessel. Sophie was with Cochrane's fleet, moored off the coast while the Battle of New Orleans was being fought on land. Sophie temporarily came under the command of Lieutenant James Barnwell Tattnall in December 1814. Following Nicholas Lockyer's promotion, he was succeeded in April 1815 by Commander Silas Hood. Hood was followed in an acting capacity by Lieutenant William G. Roberts, who paid her off at Portsmouth in 1815.

== Post-war and First Anglo-Burmese War ==
Significant repairs were carried out between 1815 and 1817, with Sophie not returning to service again until December 1818, having been recommissioned under Commander Sir William Wiseman in August. Wiseman and Sophie were based at Jamaica until 1820, when she returned to Britain for further fitting out and a return to service under Commander George French in December. French took Sophie to the East Indies, where she subsequently sailed under a number of commanders, including Commander Robert Dunlop from July 1822 to April 1823. George Ryves, the first lieutenant of HMS Alligator, became acting commander in Sophie on 8 April 1823 and received confirmation of his appointment in October.

At the outbreak of the First Anglo-Burmese War, Captain Frederick Marryat, of the 20-gun Larne and who would go on to be a novelist, took command of a squadron consisting of Sophie, the 50-gun Liffey, and the small paddle steamer Diana. On 5 May 1824, Larne, Sophie and Liffey sailed from Port Cornwallis in the Andaman Islands for Rangoon, the principal initial point of attack, with four cruisers belonging to the East India Company, under Captain Henry Hardy, together with other vessels, including Diana. They arrived on the 10th, and launched the attack on the 11th. On 3 June she and Larne attacked some stockades at Kemmendine (a suburb of Rangoon) in an action that cost her one-man drowned and four wounded.

In August 1824, the naval force in India consisted of Tees (26 guns), Alligator (28), Slaney (20), the 18-gun Cruizer-class Arachne, and Larne, Sophie, and Liffey. Of this force only Larne was at Rangoon; Sophie had been dispatched to Bengal to bring back provisions.

By September 1824, nearly one fourth of the Sophie's crew had died, and as many more were sick. The surviving officers, seamen, and marines were authorized the medal "India, No. 1", with clasp for Ava.

Between September 1824 and February 1825, Sophie, together with other vessels including Alligator, Arachne, Diana and Satellite, took part in some half-a-dozen small operations. On 19 September 1824, the British conducted offensive operations against Penang that included the boats of Arachne, Sophie, and Diana. Then on 30 October, Sophie and Arachne co-operated with the army in the attack on Martaban, about 100 miles east of Rangoon. On 30 November Sophie participated in the defence of Kemmendine. On 8 December Sophie participated in the destruction of several Burmese war canoes at Pagoda Point. Then on 11 and 12 January 1825 she participated in the attack on the factory and stockades of Syriam, an action that resulted in one of her seamen being wounded. Lastly, between 11 January and April, men and boats from Sophie participated in the attack on the Burmese capital at Ava.

In the middle of May 1825, Lieutenant Ryves was invalided. Lieutenant Edward Blanckley of Alligator was promoted to the acting command of Sophie, which departed Rangoon shortly thereafter. The Admiralty confirmed the appointment in December, by which time Sophie had been sold.

== Fate ==
Sophie was sold in the East Indies for £3,200 on 15 August 1825.

== See also ==
- HMS Speedy (1782), the likely inspiration for the Sophie of Patrick O'Brian's Master and Commander novel.
