= HMS Destruction =

At least two vessels of the Royal Navy have been named HMS Destruction.

== HMS Destruction (1804) ==
History

United Kingdom
- Name: HMS Destruction
- Ordered: 22 May 1804
- Laid down: August 1804
- Launched: 3 September 1804
- Fate: Sold 1806

General characteristics
- Tons burthen: 7681/94 (bm)
- Length: Overall:60 ft 0 in (18.3 m); Keel:49 ft 0 1/2 in (14.9 m)
- Beam: 17 ft 2 in (5.2 m)
- Depth of hold: 7 ft 0 in (2.1 m)
- Propulsion: Sails
- Sail plan: Schooner
- Armament: 4 × 18-pounder carronades + 1 × 10" mortar

Destruction was a Convulsion-class bomb vessel launched in 1804. Lieutenant Peter Wright commissioned her in 1805 for the Downs station. She was paid off in June 1806 and sold on 27 August 1806.

== HMS Destruction (1814) ==
Destruction was an American gunboat captured at the Battle of Lake Borgne on 14 December 1814. She mounted one long 24-pounder, four 12-pounder carronades, and four swivel guns. She remained in service until at least 4 June 1815. Prize money for her and the other vessels captured at the battle was paid in July 1821.
