= Thomas Lyde Hornbrook =

British painter

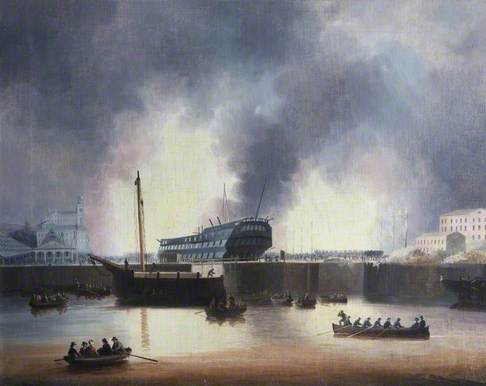
Dockyard Fire, 1840, by Thomas Lyde Hornbrook

Thomas Lyde Hornbrook (May 6, 1807 – August 17, 1855) was a British marine artist. He was the eldest son of Richards Lyde Hornbrook, who was an officer in the Royal Marines stationed in Plymouth. He exhibited in the Royal Academy (1836 and 1844) and around 1833 became marine painter to the Duchess of Kent and her daughter Victoria.
