= French frigate Weser =

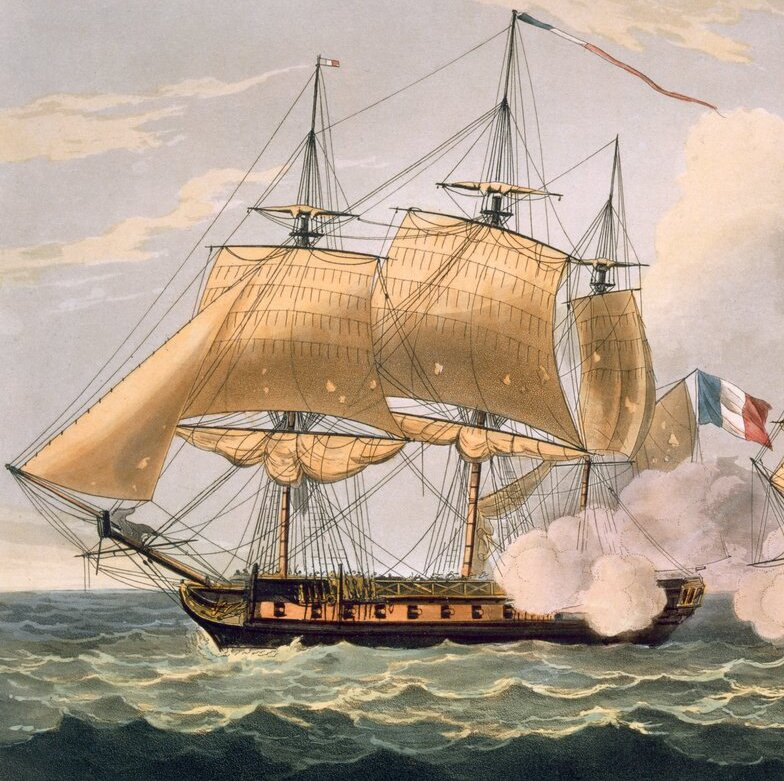
- Clorinde, a sister ship of Weser

History

France
- Name: Weser
- Namesake: Weser
- Builder: Jean-François Guillemard, Amsterdam
- Laid down: April 1811
- Launched: 12 May 1812
- Commissioned: August 1812

United Kingdom
- Name: HMS Weser
- Acquired: 1815 by capture
- Fate: Sold 1821 for breaking up

General characteristics
- Class & type: Pallas-class frigate
- Displacement: 1,080 tonnes
- Length: 46.93 m (154 ft 0 in)
- Beam: 11.91 m (39 ft 1 in)
- Draught: 5.9 m (19 ft 4 in)
- Propulsion: 1,950 m^{2} (21,000 sq ft) of sail
- Complement: 326
- Armament: Nominally 40 guns; In practice carried either 44 or 46 guns: Battery: 28 18-pounders; Quarterdeck & forecastle: 8 × 8-pounder long guns; 8 × 36-pounder carronades or 12 × 18-pounder carronades

General characteristics In British service
- Tons burthen: 1,08710/94 (bm)
- Length: Overall: 152 ft 10 1/2 in (46.6 m); Keel:127 ft 0 7/8 in (38.7 m)
- Beam: 40 ft 1 1/4 in (12.2 m)
- Depth of hold: 12 ft 6 1/4 in (3.8 m)
- Propulsion: Sail
- Complement: 300
- Armament: Upper deck: 28 × 18-pounder guns; QD: 14 × 32-pounder carronades; Fc: 2 × 32-pounder carronades + 2 × 9-pounder chase guns

Weser was a 44-gun Pallas-class frigate of the French Navy launched in 1812 in Amsterdam. The British Royal Navy captured her on 21 October 1813. As HMS Weser she served in North American waters and then was sold for breaking up in September 1817.

== Origin ==
Weser was designed by Sané.

== Capture ==
On 30 September 1813 Weser, under the command of captaine de vaisseau Cantzlaar, Chevalier de L'ordre Imperiale de la Reunion, sailed from the Texel for the North Sea. There she captured two Swedish ships before a gale on the 16th took away her main and mizzen mast. Two days later HMS Scylla, Commander Colin Macdonald, encountered her 60 leagues west of Ushant, making her way towards Brest under jury main and mizzen masts. Rather than engage Weser and risk being crippled and so unable to follow her given the weather, Macdonald decided to follow her.

Fortuitously, on 20 October, Royalist, Commander J.J. Gordon Bremer, arrived and Macdonald and Bremer decided to attack Weser. They engaged her for about an hour and a half before they had to withdraw to repair their rigging. At about this time a third British vessel, the 74-gun third rate, Rippon, Captain Christopher Cole, came up. Bremer joined Cole and informed him of the situation while Scylla remained with Weser.

The next morning, as Rippon and Royalist sailed towards Scylla to renew their attack, Weser sailed towards Rippon and struck, after first firing two broadsides towards Scylla. Scylla suffered only two men wounded in the entire engagement. Royalist suffered more heavily, having two men killed and nine wounded. Weser lost four men killed and 15 wounded. (Note: A first-class share of the prize money was worth £190 1s 3 3/4d; a sixth-class share, that of an ordinary seaman, was worth £1 11s 3d.)

== Royal Navy ==
The Navy commissioned HMS Weser in March 1814 under Commander Thomas Ball Sulivan as a troopship, armed en flûte. She underwent fitting at Plymouth for that role between February and April.

In June she was part of a convoy, Royal Oak, Diadem, Dictator, Weser, Trave, Thames, Menelaus, and Pactolus, with 2,852 troops of General Ross' brigade (WESER carried 383), and four transports with horses, forage and rockets, which sailed for America, where she was actively employed until the conclusion of the war. Commander Sulivan commanded a division of boats and tenders at the destruction of Commodore Joshua Barney's Chesapeake Bay Flotilla in the Patuxent River on 22 August 1814.

Commander Sullivan was promoted to post captain on 19 October. Under the rules of prize-money, the troopship Weser shared in the proceeds of the capture of six American vessels in the Battle of Lake Borgne on 14 December 1814.Commander Bartholomew Kent assumed command of Weser on 22 January 1815. Weser was present at the capture of Fort Bowyer near Mobile, Alabama. She then brought back to England from Quebec the sailors that had been serving on the Canadian Great Lakes. She returned to Portsmouth on 17 May 1815.Kent paid Weser off at Portsmouth on 27 October.

On 21 October 1815 Commander Daniel Lawrence was appointed captain of Weser. He was promoted to post captain on 2 September 1816.

== Fate ==
The "Principal Officers and Commissioners of His Majesty's Navy" offered "Weser, of 38 guns and 1081 tons", lying at Portsmouth, for sale on 3 April 1817. She finally sold at Portsmouth to Mr. Bailey for £1,500 on 17 September 1817.
