= USS Sea Horse (1812) =

American schooner

History

United States
- Name: USS Sea Horse
- Acquired: 1812 by purchase
- Homeport: New Orleans
- Fate: Scuttled; December 13, 1814

General characteristics
- Type: Schooner
- Complement: 14 officers and crew
- Armament: 1 × 6-pounder gun

The first USS Sea Horse was a one-gun schooner that the Navy purchased in 1812 for service on Lake Borgne, near New Orleans, Louisiana. It is claimed she was one of 15 vessels available to Commodore Daniel Todd Patterson in New Orleans at the outbreak of war with Britain in 1812. The Sea Horse and USS Alligator accompanied a squadron of five gunboats at the end of 1814. In addition to these vessels, there was also a further gunboat at Fort St. Philip, as well as the USS Carolina (1812) and USS Louisiana (1812).

She saw action as a tender to a squadron of gunboats, under the command of Lieutenant Thomas ap Catesby Jones, that in December 1814 opposed the British advance on New Orleans. On the afternoon of December 13, 1814, at 2:00pm Jones dispatched Sea Horse to a store house, to remove its contents, to prevent capture by the British.

At 3:45pm, Sea Horse was moored at Bay St Louis next to a store house and a battery of two 6–pounder cannons. The schooner, with assisted by the battery, fired on three approaching launches with grapeshot, forcing them to retire out of range. Sea Horse faced a subsequent attack by four more launches as reinforcements, commanded by Captain Samuel Roberts of HMS Meteor. This renewed attack was "repulsed after sustaining for nearly half an hour a very destructive fire." In the face of superior numbers, Sea Horse was scuttled and the store was set alight, an explosion occurring at 7:30pm with a large fire being visible thereafter. Jones subsequently confirmed that he had permitted Sailing Master William Johnson, her commanding officer, to destroy Sea Horse to prevent her being captured.

== See also ==
- USS Tickler
- USS Alligator (1813)
- Battle of Lake Borgne
