= USS Alligator (1813) =

Tender of the United States Navy

History

United States
- Name: USS Alligator
- Acquired: Purchased, 1813
- Fate: Captured, 14 December 1814

General characteristics
- Type: Sloop
- Propulsion: Sail (Sloop)
- Complement: 20
- Armament: 1 × long 6-pounder gun 2 × 12-pounder carronades

USS Alligator was a sloop in the United States Navy during the War of 1812. The U.S. Navy purchased Alligator in 1813 (or 1812) at New Orleans, Louisiana. Commissioned as a tender at New Orleans, she served on that station under the command of Captain Robert Hatch until late in 1814 when the British captured her at the Battle of Lake Borgne.

== Service ==
After the capture of Pensacola on 7 November 1814 Major General Andrew Jackson arrived at New Orleans on 1 December to make preparations for the defense of that city. He organized with Master Commandant Daniel Patterson of the U.S. Navy to send a flotilla to Lake Borgne to guard and defend against the approach of Vice Admiral Sir Alexander Cochrane and his fleet. (Note: Patterson was a prisoner with Commodore William Bainbridge in Tripoli during the First Barbary War Cochrane was a seasoned veteran of the Napoleonic Wars)

Lieutenant Thomas Jones commanded the American flotilla of five large gunboats, which had about 180 men for the crews. The gunboats were armed with 24 and 32-pounder long guns, 6 and 12-pounder carronades, and swivel guns. Among the flotilla was the sloop-rigged Alligator with a long 6-pounder and two 12-pounder carronades with its crew of 20 men.

On 12 December after most of the British fleet arrived east of New Orleans, Cochrane sent commander Nicholas Lockyer with a flotilla of about 42 open ship's boats and barges armed with a carronade apiece, three unarmed gigs and upwards of 1,000 bluejackets and Royal Marines to attack Jones' flotilla. (Note: Roosevelt cites the number of Royal Navy personnel at 980, Malcomson gives a rounded number of 1,000, while Cooper acknowledges that computations of this number vary from 1,200 to as low as 400, however he also notes that the sizes and number of the barges present at the battle render the lower number improbable.) By mid-morning on 13 December Jones had observed a large flotilla of longboats leaving the British fleet, which he supposed were disembarking troops. At 2pm he realised the British were approaching his gunboats. He quickly pulled up anchors and retreated westward with orders from Patterson to defend the passage into Lake Pontchartrain at all costs as this lake would give the British naval access to New Orleans situated on its southern shore. At the time the water level of the lake (Borgne) was lower than normal which forced Jones to lighten the load of his vessels, allowing him to elude the approaching British boats. That morning Jones sent Seahorse to remove ordnance and other supplies from the store house with the shore battery of two 6-pounder cannons on the north shore. Having skirmished with seven British longboats, the crew destroyed the store house and scuttled Seahorse at 7:30pm; this resulted in an explosion and a visible fire. Unable to withdraw any further Jones anchored his flotilla some 15 miles from the entrance of the lake. Lockyer's force could not advance in striking range due to the low tide, opposing currents and adverse winds until the morning of 14 December, when conditions became more favorable.

At 9:30am on 14 December, Lockyer's longboats first attacked the Alligator which had fallen behind the rest of the American flotilla, to the southward and eastward. Being lightly armed it fell in little time. The remainder of the British flotilla now formed a long line at 10:00am, in cannon range of the gunboats. At 10:39am they slowly advanced on the American positions on the lake. Jones had anchored his boats end to end forming a line and a broadside to block the anticipated British advance. As the British vessels came within striking range the American flotilla together fired a destructive broadside which temporarily repelled the attack. At this point the tide and current had changed again, two of the American gunboats had broken formation. Jones and Lockyer sustained serious wounds from the ensuing battle. As the battle continued the British managed to cut through the boarding nets and took over the American gunboats, turning and using the gunboats' cannons against the American forces to secure their victory by 12:30pm.

Alligator's participation in the Battle of Lake Borgne — an American defeat, but one that helped to buy precious time for General Andrew Jackson's successful defense of New Orleans – proved very brief. Her disposition by the British is unknown.

== See also ==
- List of sailing frigates of the United States Navy
- Naval tactics in the Age of Sail

== Bibliography ==
- Brannan, John, ed. (1823). Official letters of the military and naval officers of the United States : during the war with Great Britain in the years 1812, 13, 14, & 15. Washington, D.C.: Way & Gideon. OCLC 1083481275.
- Cooper, James Fenimore (1856). History of the Navy of the United States of America. New York: Stringer & Townsend. OCLC 197401914.
- Dept U.S.Navy. "Alligator". Dictionary of American Naval Fighting Ships. Department of the Navy -- Naval Historical Center. Archived from the original on 7 December 2010.
- Malcomson, Robert (2006). Historical Dictionary of the War of 1812. Lanham, MD: Scarecrow Press. ISBN 0-8108-5499-6.
- Roosevelt, Theodore (1900). The Naval War of 1812. Vol. II. Annapolis: Naval Institute Press.
