= Lake Borgne =

Lagoon of the Gulf of Mexico in southeastern Louisiana, United States

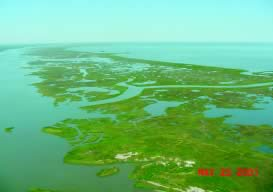
- A strip of marsh separates the MRGO (left) from the lake (right)

- Location within Louisiana
- Location: Orleans / St. Bernard / St. Tammany parishes, Louisiana / Hancock County, Mississippi, United States
- Coordinates: 30°01′41″N 89°37′03″W
- Type: lagoon
- Primary inflows: MRGO and Mississippi River
- Primary outflows: Gulf of Mexico
- Catchment area: 38,000 km^{2} (15,000 sq mi)
- Basin countries: United States
- Surface area: 730 km^{2} (280 sq mi)
- Average depth: 3 m (9.8 ft)
- Settlements: New Orleans

Lake Borgne (/bɔːrn/ BORN; French: Lac Borgne French pronunciation: [lak bɔʁɲ], lit. 'One-Eyed Lake'; Spanish: Lago Borgne) is a lagoon of the Gulf of Mexico in southeastern Louisiana. Although early maps show it as a lake surrounded by land, coastal erosion has made it an arm of the Gulf of Mexico.

== Geography ==
In southern Louisiana, three large lakes—Maurepas, Pontchartrain, and Borgne—cover 55% of the Pontchartrain Basin. A brackish marsh land bridge and Lake St. Catherine separate Lake Pontchartrain from Lake Borgne. The Rigolets and Chef Menteur Pass are the two open water connections between Pontchartrain and Borgne.

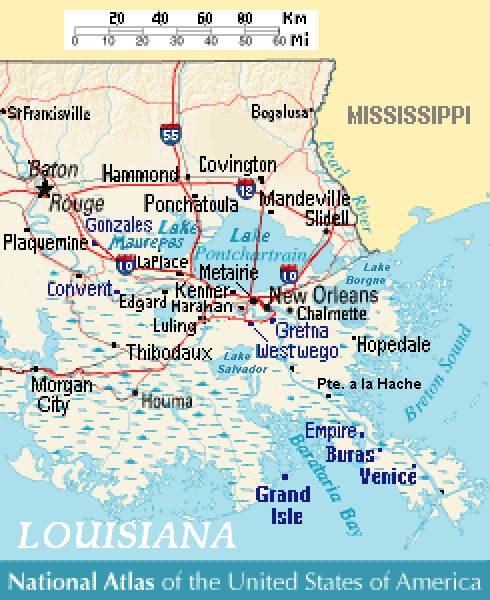
Lake Borgne [right center] is southeast of Lake Pontchartrain and east of New Orleans, Louisiana.

Coastal erosion has transformed Borgne into a lagoon connecting to the Gulf of Mexico. Early 18th-century maps show Borgne as a true lake, largely separated from the gulf by a considerable extent of wetlands that have since disappeared. In a 1902 case before the United States Supreme Court over the oyster banks at the boundary between Louisiana and Mississippi, the State of Mississippi argued that at the time of Louisiana's admission into the Union (1812), there probably was no such "Lake Borgne" or "Mississippi Sound".

The basin contains 483,390 acres (1,956.2 km^{2}) of wetlands, consisting of nearly 38,500 acres (156 km^{2}) of fresh marsh, 28,600 acres (116 km^{2}) of intermediate marsh, 116,800 acres (473 km^{2}) of brackish marsh, 83,900 acres (340 km^{2}) of saline marsh, and 215,600 acres (873 km^{2}) of cypress swamp. Since 1932, more than 66,000 acres (270 km^{2}) of marsh have converted to water in the Pontchartrain Basin—over 22% of the marsh that existed in 1932.

The primary causes of wetland loss in the basin are the effects of natural changes to the topography over time and can and will change in the future, the hydrological isolation of the Mississippi River from its floodplains (which deprives the coast of sediment needed to build and sustain land), and the extensive cutting and channelization of coastal wetlands (which destabilizes existing land, hastening the transition to open water).

In response to the extensive damage from Hurricane Katrina in 2005, the Army Corps of Engineers constructed the 1.8-mile-long (2.9 km) IHNC Lake Borgne Surge Barrier, as part of the Hurricane & Storm Damage Risk Reduction System for southeast Louisiana. The project cost approximately $1.1 billion and was built at the confluence of the Gulf Intracoastal Waterway and the Mississippi River Gulf Outlet (MRGO). It is the largest design-build civil works project in the history of the Corps. It was first used in 2012 to protect against storm surge from Hurricane Isaac and was fully completed in 2013.

== Ecology ==
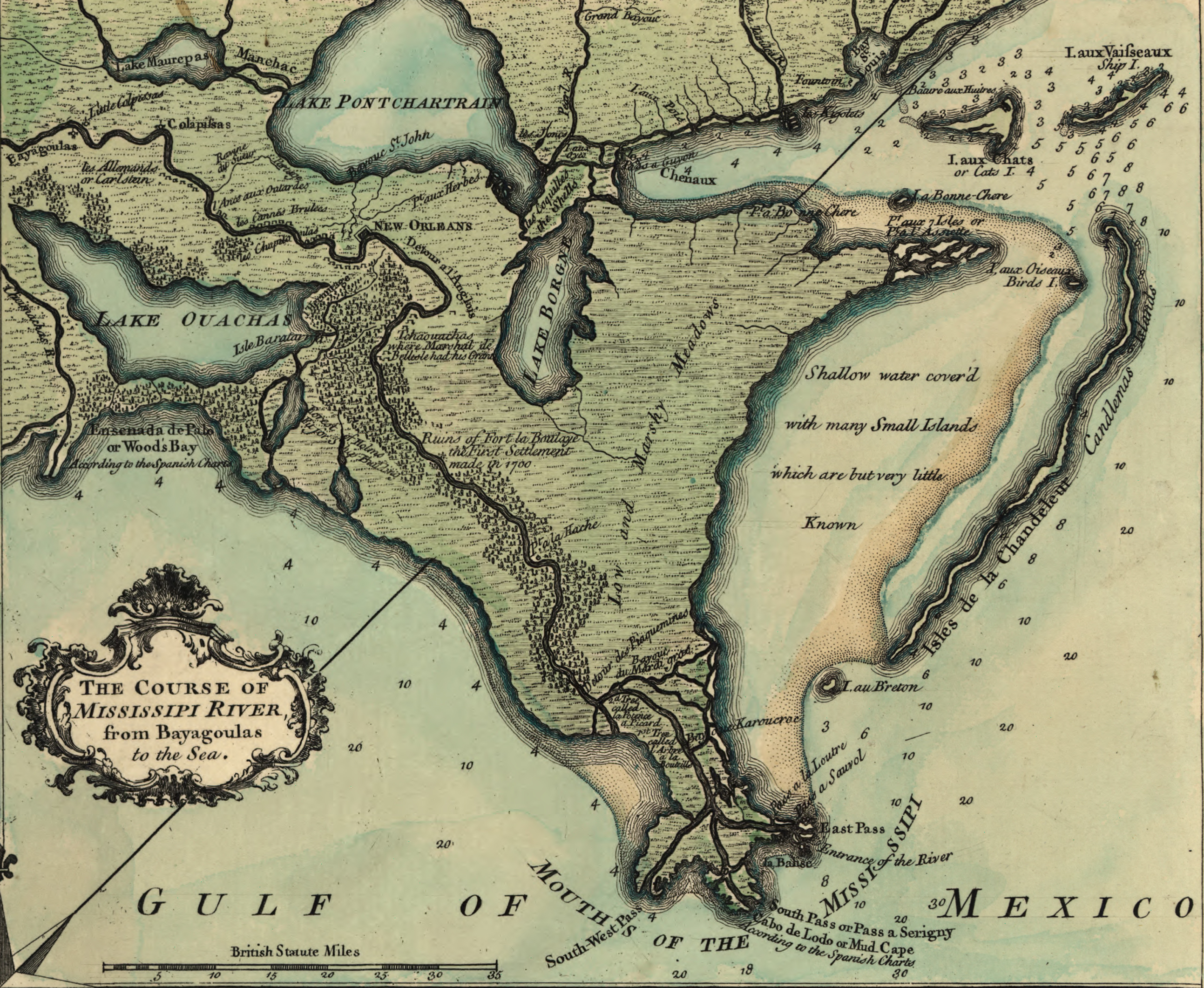
This 1759 map based on the 1720 de la Tour survey shows Lake Borgne separated from the Gulf of Mexico by "Low and Marshy Meadows" (wetlands).

The Mississippi River levees significantly limit the input of fresh water, sediment, and nutrients into the Pontchartrain basin. This reduction in freshwater input plays a role in the critical problem of the Pontchartrain Basin—increased salinity. The construction of the MRGO, which breaches the natural barrier of the Bayou La Loutre ridge and the Borgne land bridge, has allowed sea water to push farther into the basin. Relative sea level rise of up to 0.96 feet per century also gives saltier waters greater access to surrounding wetlands. As a result, mean monthly salinities have increased since the construction of the MRGO and other canals. In recent years, salinities have stabilized. The heightened salinity has stressed wetlands, especially freshwater marshes and swamps.

Since 1932, approximately 24% of the Borgne Land Bridge has been lost to severe shoreline retreat and rapid tidal fluctuations, and the loss rate is increasing. During the same time, 17% of the Maurepas Land Bridge marshes disappeared because of subsidence and spikes in lake salinity. These land bridges prevent estuarine processes, such as increased salinity and tidal scour, from pushing further into the middle and upper basins. Additionally, from 1968 to 1988, 32% of the cypress swamp on the land bridge had either converted to marsh or became open water. If these buffers are not preserved, the land loss rates around Lakes Pontchartrain and Maurepas will increase dramatically. Several marshes in the basin are vulnerable to rapid loss if adequate protection is not quickly provided.

== See also ==
- "The Lakes of Pontchartrain"
