= Major D'Aquin's Battalion of Free Men of Color =

Major D'Aquin's Battalion of Free Men of Colour
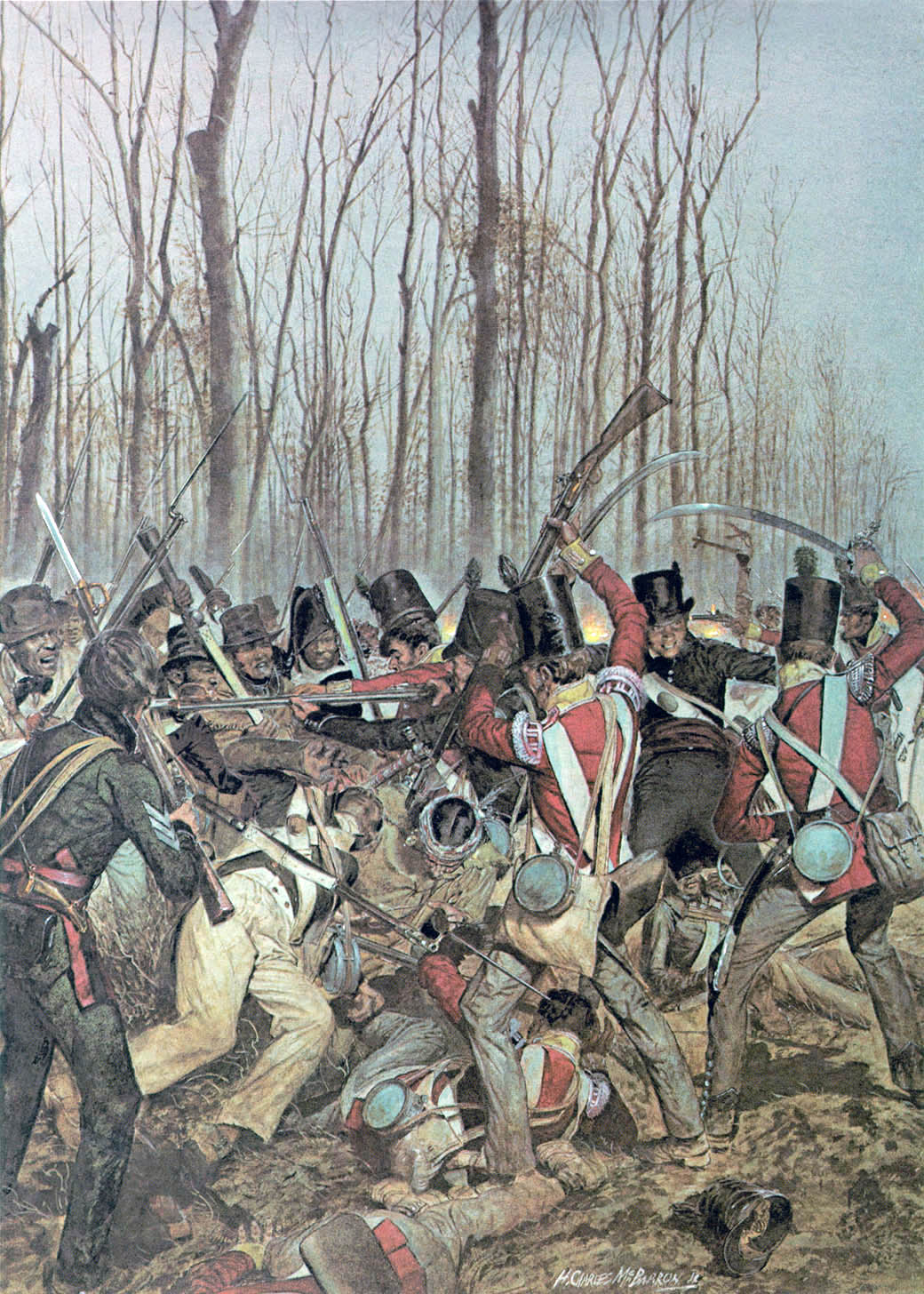
- An illustration of the unit by H. Charles McBarron Jr.
- Active: 1814–1815
- Country: United States
- Branch: Louisiana Militia
- Type: Infantry
- Size: 4 companies
- Engagements: War of 1812; Battle of Villeré's Plantation; Battle of New Orleans

Commanders
- Notable commanders: Major Louis D'Aquin; Captain Joseph Savary

Major D'Aquin's Battalion of Free Men of Color was a Louisiana Militia unit consisting of free people of color which fought in the Battle of New Orleans during the War of 1812. The unit's nominal commander was Major Louis D'Aquin, but during the battle it was led by Captain Joseph Savary. Consisting of four companies, it distinguished itself during an American sortie against a British encampment on the night of December 23, 1814 and during the main battle near New Orleans on January 8, 1815. After the battle, General Andrew Jackson, who had held overall command of all U.S. forces present, praised the unit for their performance during the engagement.

Despite the municipal authorities of New Orleans preventing Black soldiers from participating in the victory celebrations, Savary nevertheless led the unit in a victory parade through the city streets. However, concerns from local white residents that the unit was destabilizing the institution of slavery in the United States and could inspire slave rebellions led Jackson to order it out of New Orleans. After its disbandment, many veterans of the unit, including Savary, travelled to Spanish Texas and fought in the Mexican War of Independence.

== Background ==
On September 21, 1814, General Andrew Jackson of the United States Army issued a proclamation from his headquarters at Mobile, Alabama to free people of color in Louisiana. The proclamation regretted the United States government's previous policies of neglecting to recruit Black people into the militia, and invited them to enlist on the promise of a bounty of 160 acres of land for enlisting. This was done as the U.S. was at war with the British, who had just launched an invasion of Louisiana. Numerous free people of color responded to his proclamation, and two infantry battalions and a home guard company were formed and placed into the Louisiana Militia. These units were officered exclusively by white men, but Black enlistees were allowed to serve as non-commissioned officers.

== Organization ==
The second battalion formed as a result of Jackson's proclamation was known as "Major D'Aquin's Battalion of Free Men of Color". It consisted of 256 men recruited from refugee Dominican Creoles who had fled the French colony of Saint-Domingue as a result of the Haitian Revolution. They had been recruited by Joseph Savary, himself a Creole refugee who had served with the French Revolutionary Army in Saint-Domingue at the rank of lieutenant colonel. The unit was placed under the command of Major Louis D'Aquin, a white Creole refugee who was serving in the 2nd Regiment of Louisiana Militia. The majority of the unit's members were attired in civilian clothing due to the hasty nature of their organization. It was mustered into service on December 19, 1814, with Savary serving as second-in-command at the rank of captain, alongside three other Black non-commissioned officers. The unit consisted of one company of grenadiers, one company of chasseurs and two companies of line infantry.

== Military engagements ==
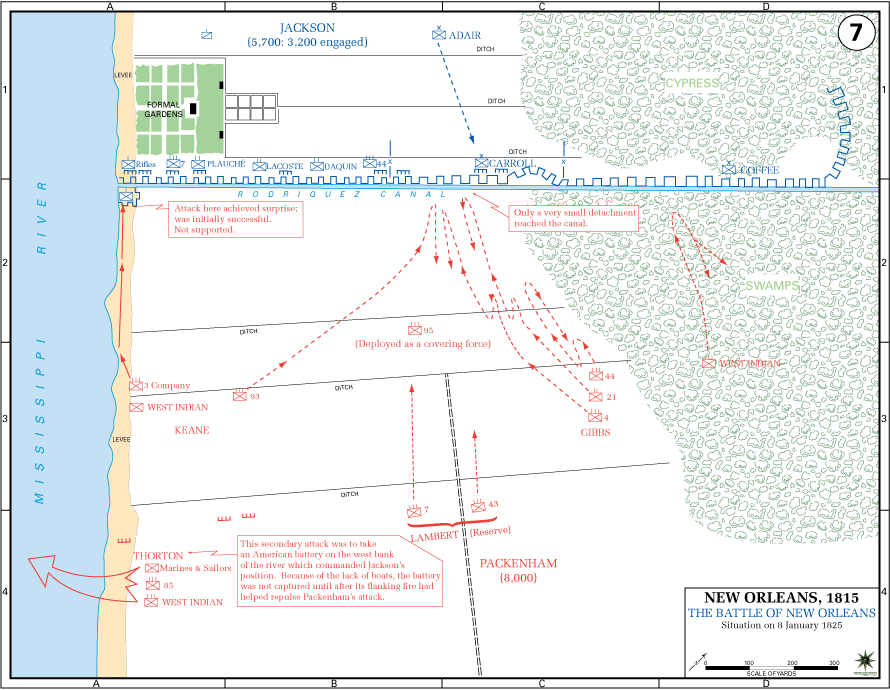
The unit was positioned on the right flank of the American defensive line.

In December 1814, British forces reached the Mississippi River and occupied Jacques Villeré's plantation Conseil, where they established a camp. On the night of December 23, nearby American forces, including D'Aquin's unit, launched a sortie against the plantation in two columns, supported by the USS Carolina on the river. After several hours of haphazard, unorganized combat, the British position was stiffened with reinforcements and Jackson gave the order to withdraw. The Americans lost 213 men killed and wounded during the sortie, while the British suffered 267, but their advance had been delayed enough for Jackson to fortify the defensive line he had established behind the Rodriguez Canal. The unit played a leading role in the skirmish, with Savary encouraging his men forward with the words "March on! March on my friends, march on against the enemies of the country" in Haitian French.

During the Battle of New Orleans on January 8, 1815, the unit, with an effective strength of roughly 150 men, was once again under the de facto command of Savary. It was positioned on the right flank of the American defensive line. To their right was Major Plauchés' Battalion of Free Men of Color, and to their left was the 44th Infantry Regiment, with a strength of 350 soldiers, or 240. During the battle, Savary's unit made an unauthorized attack, reaching the British lines before returning to their own line. The engagement ultimately ended in an American victory, and the British withdrew from Louisiana entirely. Among the six killed and seven wounded in the action on the east bank of the river, there was one fatality among 'majors Lacoste's and Dacquin's[sic] volunteers of colour[sic], 1 private'.

== Disbandment ==
After the battle, Jackson praised both D'Aquin and Plauchés' units, stating they had not "disappointed the hopes that had been formed of their courage and perseverance." Jackson specifically emphasized Savary as worthy of commendation; however, he also assigned Savary's men, along with Plauchés' unit, to carry out fatigue duties which white soldiers had refused to do. Savary responded by forbidding his men to carry out any menial tasks which had been rejected by white troops as beneath them. Despite the municipal authorities of New Orleans preventing Black soldiers from participating in the victory celebrations, Savary nevertheless led the unit in a victory parade through the city streets.

Jackson issued a direct order stipulating that the unit receive their land bounty promised to them, but the federal government refused and the matter was dropped. Concerns from local white residents that the unit was destabilizing the institution of slavery in the United States and could inspire slave rebellions led Jackson to order it out of New Orleans, where it was disbanded. After its disbandment, many veterans of the unit, including Savary, travelled to Spanish Texas where they linked up with French pirate Pierre Lafitte, who was an associate of Savary. Many of these men subsequently fought in the Mexican War of Independence against Spanish rule, while Savary returned to the U.S. at an unknown point, being recorded as residing in New Orleans in 1822.
