= USS Eagle (1814 schooner) =

History

United States
- Name: USS Eagle
- Homeport: New Orleans, Louisiana

General characteristics
- Type: schooner
- Notes: War of 1812; Louisiana Campaign

The schooner USS Eagle was the fourth vessel to bear the name and was one of three ships named USS Eagle during the War of 1812 by the United States. She was purchased by the navy at New Orleans, Louisiana in 1814 and armed with twelve guns.

Lieutenant Thomas ap Catesby Jones sent a dispatch dated 11 November 1814 to Master Commandant Patterson. He mentions that during his mission to find the Baratarian pirates, that 'the Eagle not sailing as well as expected' was accompanied by two prize schooners and 3 Jeffersonian gunboats.
