= USS Carolina (1812) =

Schooner of the US Navy, in service from 1813 to 1814

Coordinates: 29.935°N 89.995°W

History

United States
- Name: USS Carolina
- Launched: 10 November 1812
- Commissioned: 4 June 1813
- Fate: Sunk 27 December 1814

General characteristics
- Displacement: 230 tons
- Length: 89 ft 6 in (27.28 m)
- Beam: 24 ft 4 in (7.42 m)
- Complement: 100 officers and men
- Armament: originally; 3 × long nine-pounders guns; 12 × 12-pounder carronades
- Notes: War of 1812; Battle of New Orleans

USS Carolina, a schooner, was the only ship of the United States Navy to be named for the British colony that became the states of North Carolina and South Carolina.

== Service ==
Her keel was laid down at Charleston, South Carolina. She was purchased by the Navy while still on the stocks, launched on 10 November 1812, and commissioned on 4 June 1813 with Lieutenant John D. Henley in command.

Carolina set sail for New Orleans, Louisiana, and while making her passage, captured the British schooner Shark. Arriving at New Orleans 23 August 1814, she began an active career of patrol directed against possible British action as well as the pirates that infested the Caribbean Sea. On 16 September 1814, Carolina attacked and destroyed the stronghold of the notorious Jean Lafitte on the island of Barataria.

Carolina, with the others of the small naval force in the area, carried out the series of operations which gave General Andrew Jackson time to prepare the defense of New Orleans when the British threatened the city in December 1814. On 23 December, she dropped down the river to the British bivouac which she bombarded with so telling an effect as to make a material contribution to the eventual victory. For the subsequent days, the Carolina, supported by two gunboats, bombarded the British camp, which was bereft of artillery at this time.

The British covertly erected a gun battery with embrasures, hidden behind the levee, camouflaged with corn stalks. On 26 December, the hot shot furnace had been completed. Under cover of night, the cannons were moved to the battery. The battery was sited 800 yards from where the Carolina was moored. As the British stiffened their efforts to destroy the naval force and to take the city, Carolina came under heavy fire from enemy artillery on 27 December. (Note: 'A battery was thrown up during the two succeeding nights on the brink of the river opposite to where the Carolina lay; and at dawn a heavy cannonade of red hot shot and shell was opened upon her from eleven guns and a mortar. She responded briskly, but very soon caught fire and blew up... Her destruction removed the last obstacle to the immediate advance of the army.') Just before 8am, the bombardment started. The heated shot set her afire, and her crew was forced to abandon her. (Note: The Carolina was only blown up because the wind happened to fail her [from sailing away]) (Note: 'The late United States Schooner Carolina destroyed on the 27th by hot shot from a Battery, erected by the Enemy, unknown to us.') At 10:30, she exploded. Most of her crew escaped, with two of the ship's cannons. USS Louisiana moved upstream, out of the range of the concealed battery.

Patterson ordered Lieutenant Francis de Bellevue and his Marines to man two gun batteries, totaling nine guns, to be stationed on the Right Bank and provide covering fire for any British assault on the river road to Line Jackson (name of the U.S. defensive line at the Rodriguez Canal) and New Orleans. Also present was Henley, commanding a battery of two 24 pdr cannon. On the Left Bank, Lieutenants Ortho Norris and Charles Crawley, and their gun crews, manned gun positions on Line Jackson.
