= The Eighth (United States) =

Federal holiday in the United States

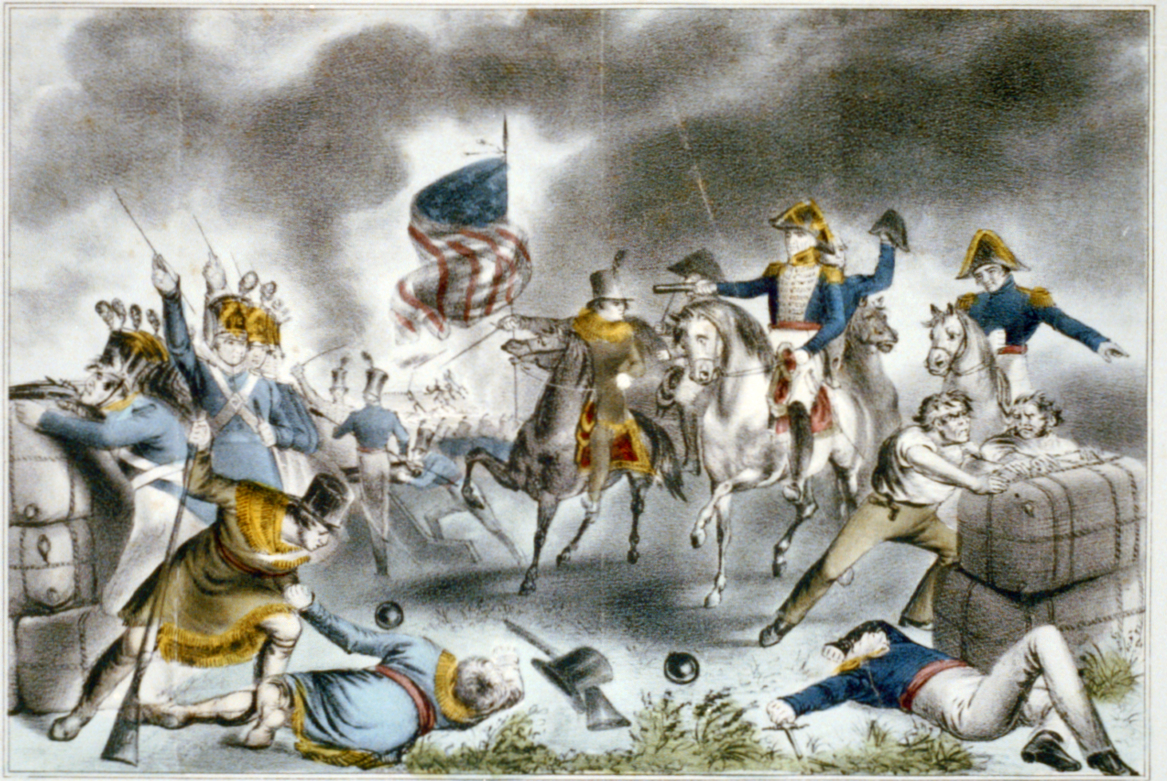
- The Battle of New Orleans by N. Currier shows Brevet Major General Andrew Jackson's victory on January 8, 1815.
- Observed by: Louisiana
- Type: Federal holiday (formerly); State holiday
- Date: January 8
- Next time: 8 January 2027
- Frequency: annual

The Eighth was a federal holiday in the United States from 1828 until 1861 commemorating the U.S. victory in the Battle of New Orleans on January 8, 1815.

== Origins ==
The Eighth was celebrated widely across the Southern United States after the War of 1812. January 8 became an official federal holiday in 1828, following Andrew Jackson's election as president and continued as such from that time until the start of the Civil War. The holiday remains largely forgotten by the American public. In the years before the Civil War, "'To the glorious Eighth of January'—or a similar expression—was invariably conspicuous among the regular toasts pledged at public dinners...most Mississippians cherished the firms conviction than the Eighth of January obviated the necessity of more commonplace qualifications" for the presidency.

According to The Bryan (Ohio) Times article from January 4, 2005, the Battle of New Orleans was a "major turning point" in American history, but many people who live in New Orleans did not even know that the battle happened in their city. As it was the final war waged against the United Kingdom of Great Britain and Ireland, some consider it to be America's second independence. Historians recall the celebrations were larger than Christmas and were only surpassed by The Fourth.

== See also ==
- Federal holidays in the United States
- Public holidays in the United States

== Sources ==
- Miles, Edwin Arthur (1970) [1960]. Jacksonian Democracy in Mississippi. The American Scene: Comments and Commentators. New York City: De Capo Press. LCCN 78107415. SBN 306-71884-7.
