= USS Louisiana (1812) =

Sloops-of-war of the United States Navy

History

United States
- Name: USS Louisiana
- Namesake: Louisiana
- Launched: 1812
- Fate: Broken up 1821

General characteristics
- Type: Sloop-of-war
- Tons burthen: 341 tons
- Length: 99 ft 6 in (30.33 m)
- Beam: 28 ft 0 in (8.53 m)
- Depth of hold: 14 ft 0 in (4.27 m)
- Armament: 16 x 24 pdr guns

USS Louisiana, was a sloop built in New Orleans in 1812 and she played a vital role in the events that led up to the Battle of New Orleans during the War of 1812 between the United States and the United Kingdom.

== Career ==
Originally built for the cost of $15,500, (Note: 'Originally a merchant sloop built in New Orleans in 1812 at a cost of $15,500, USS Louisiana displaced 341 tons, and rated 16 guns (which were to be 24-pounders). She measured 99 feet 6 inches (30.33 m) on the deck, beam of 28 feet (8.5 m), and a 14-foot (4.3 m) deep hold. Louisiana lacked a crew at the start of the campaign, and commanded by Captain Charles C. B. Thompson. He entered the navy as a midshipman 22 December 1802, and promoted to lieutenant as of 15 February 1809. After the war he continued to serve, and achieved the rank of captain by 1825.) Louisiana was built in 1812 as a merchant vessel, for use on the Mississippi River. She was purchased by the United States Navy that September. Patterson lamented that he had no crew as of 31 January 1814. Louisiana was commanded later in 1814 by Lieutenant Charles C. B. Thompson. (Note: 'Lieut. Thompson reported himself to me on the 11th [December] and I have put him in command of the Ship Louisiana, which I am fitting for River Service.')

As the largest vessel on the New Orleans station, Louisiana became the flagship of Master Commandant Daniel Patterson.

From 23 December 1814 to 8 January 1815, Louisiana provided naval gunfire support for General Andrew Jackson's forces. (Note: 'The first LOUISIANA, a sloop built in New Orleans in 1812, played a vital role in the defense of New Orleans during the war of 1812. From 23 December 1814 to 8 January 1815, the sloop LOUISIANA pounded advancing British troops, providing naval gunfire support for General Jackson’s troops. When British troops advanced up river beyond the range of the deadly cannon fire of the sloop LOUISIANA, the crew did not let the absence of wind deter their support. Crewmembers waded ashore with mooring lines and towed their sloop up river against the currents of the mighty Mississippi to re-engage. LOUISIANA was credited with playing a key role in the defeat of the British and keeping the valuable port of New Orleans in American hands.') Louisiana served as a floating battery, to counter any potential land or water-borne attack.

On 27 December, the schooner USS Carolina was sunk in a massive explosion, caused by a fire started by a heated shot fired by the British. Louisiana was 300 yards (270 m) away, and situated where it was able to take advantage of a breeze, to sail upstream and out of range of the concealed British battery. Further movement upriver, against the flow, was made by warping and hard towing, in the absence of winds.

On 28 December, a British reconnaissance force approached the American front line, and were broadsided by Louisiana's guns, along with Jackson's artillery, which halted the British advance. American prisoners were told by their British captors they believed Louisiana had prevented them from succeeding in taking Line Jackson. While enduring an incessant seven‑hour cannonade by the British, Louisiana retaliated by firing approximately 800 rounds while suffering only one sailor wounded. In a dispatch sent to Secretary of the Navy Jones on 28 December, Patterson commended the manner in which the crew, commanded by Thompson, were a well-disciplined and cohesive team, despite the fact that only a third of them spoke English. He had a hastily assembled 'crew obtained by coercion from the streets of the city, composed of all nations.' (Note: The USS Yorktown was a 16-gun sloop-of-war of the United States Navy. This similar vessel had a complement of 150 crewmen)

Louisiana did not participate in the artillery duel of 1 January. It had contributed cannon to a shore battery elsewhere which, independently, cannonaded a British battery on the other shore.

During the prelude to the battle, the gunners disembarked four 12-pounder cannon, taken from the inshore side of the sloop, and manned the artillery positions on the right bank of the Mississippi. Patterson had considered using Louisiana in a pre-emptive engagement against the British rowboats, that were assembling for an amphibious assault on the right bank, but decided against this, as there was also the risk that Louisiana would be exposed to hot shot, which had led to the destruction of USS Carolina.

Artillery fire from the right bank, and from Louisiana moored to the north of these positions, pulverized the British attack on the left bank on the morning of 8 January. On 9 January, with the truce over, Louisiana moved downstream, to resume Jackson's bombardment.

In his battle portrait, painted in 1856, Dennis Malone Carter has the sails of Louisiana visible in the background, behind Jackson surveying the defenses.

== Fate ==
Louisiana was broken up in 1821.
