= Rodriguez Canal =

Historical canal in St. Bernard Parish, Louisiana, United States of America

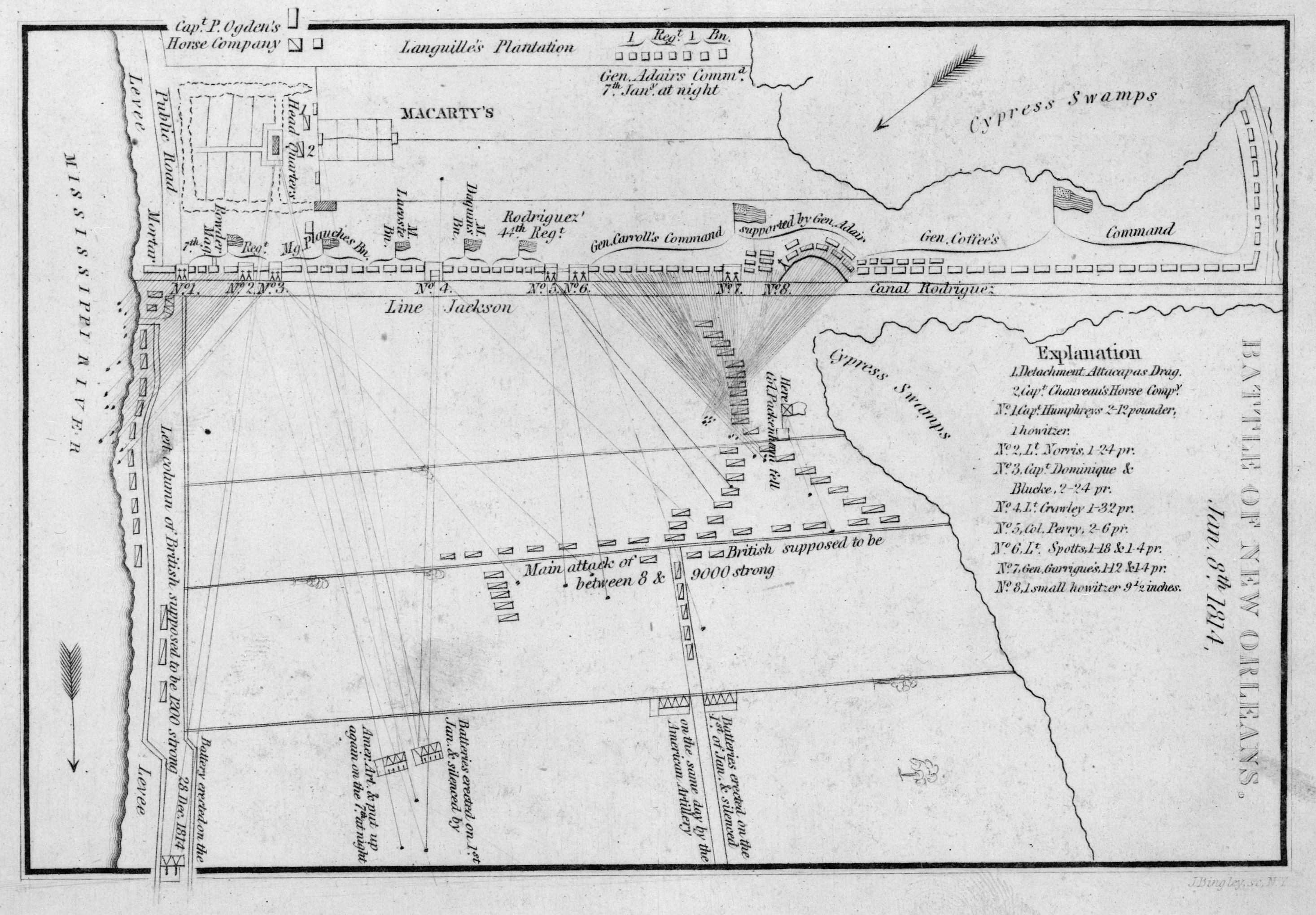
Rodriguez Canal cut across the battlefield during the Battle of New Orleans, 1815.

Rodriguez Canal was a ditch that cut across the battlefield during the Battle of New Orleans in 1815. Andrew Jackson arranged his defensive line behind it.

== History ==
Rodriguez Canal is a disused millrace for a sawmill between the Chalmette and Macarty plantations. The dilapidated canal measured about four feet deep by twenty feet wide at the time of the Battle of New Orleans, and stood as a natural battlefield divide between the combatants. General Jackson arranged his defensive line behind this ditch, building ramparts behind it. Today, the canal ruins form part of the Jean Lafitte National Historical Park and Preserve.

== Illustrations ==
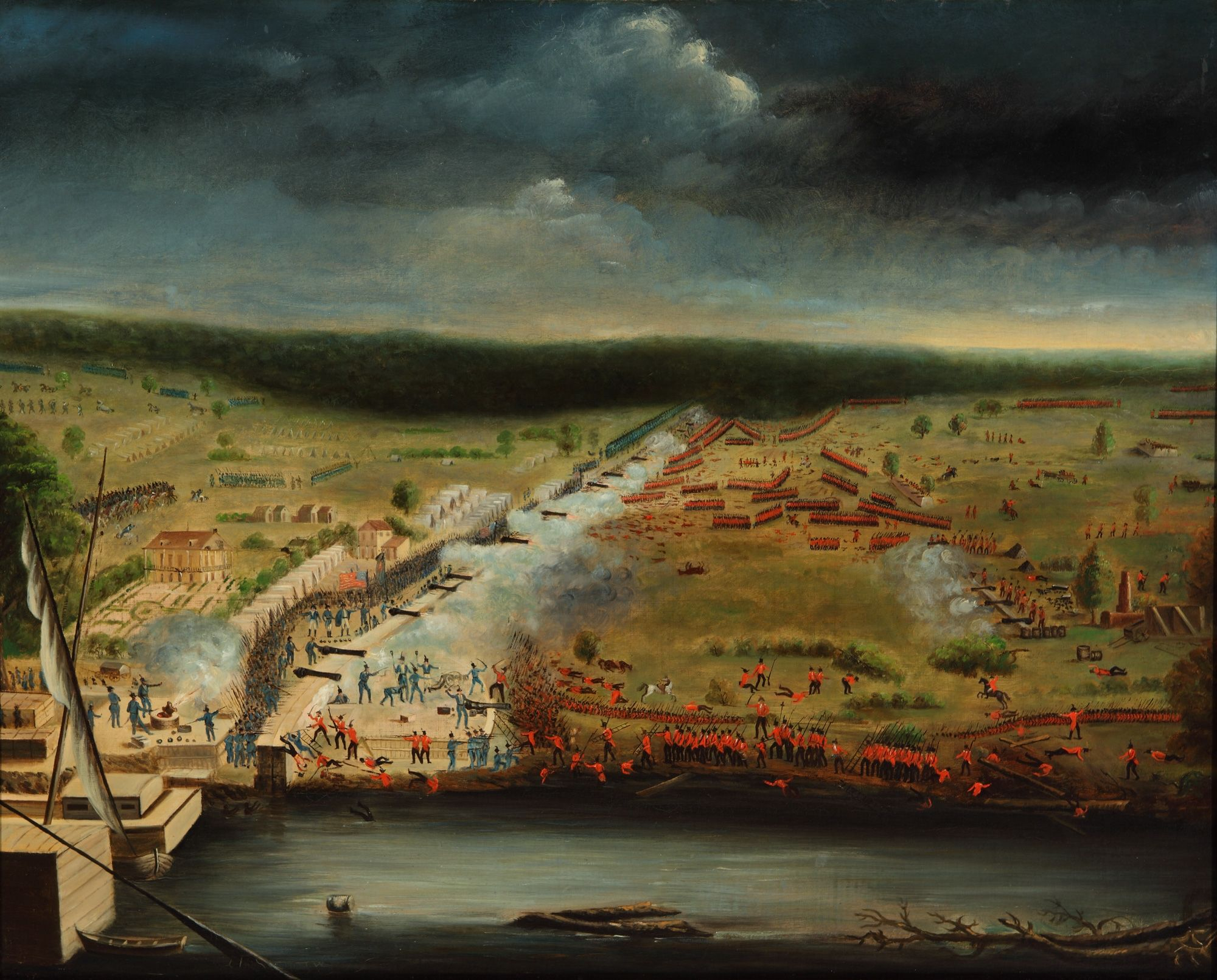
The Rodriguez Canal as seen from the Mississippi during the battle.

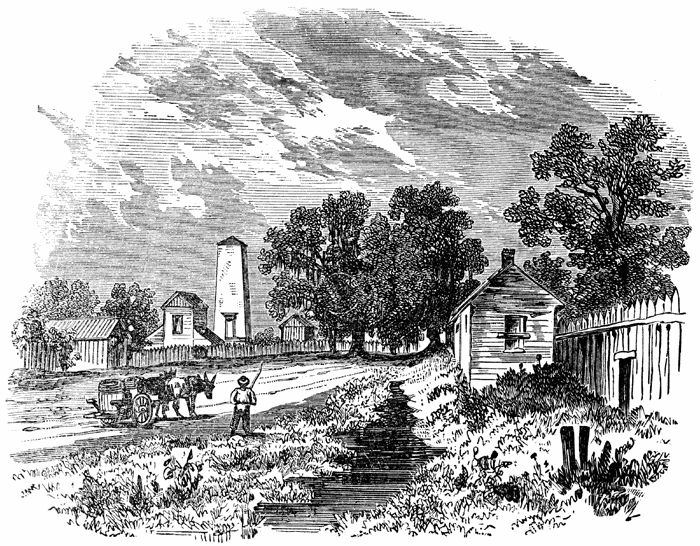
The remains of Rodriguez Canal in 1861. In the background the original Chalmette Monument.

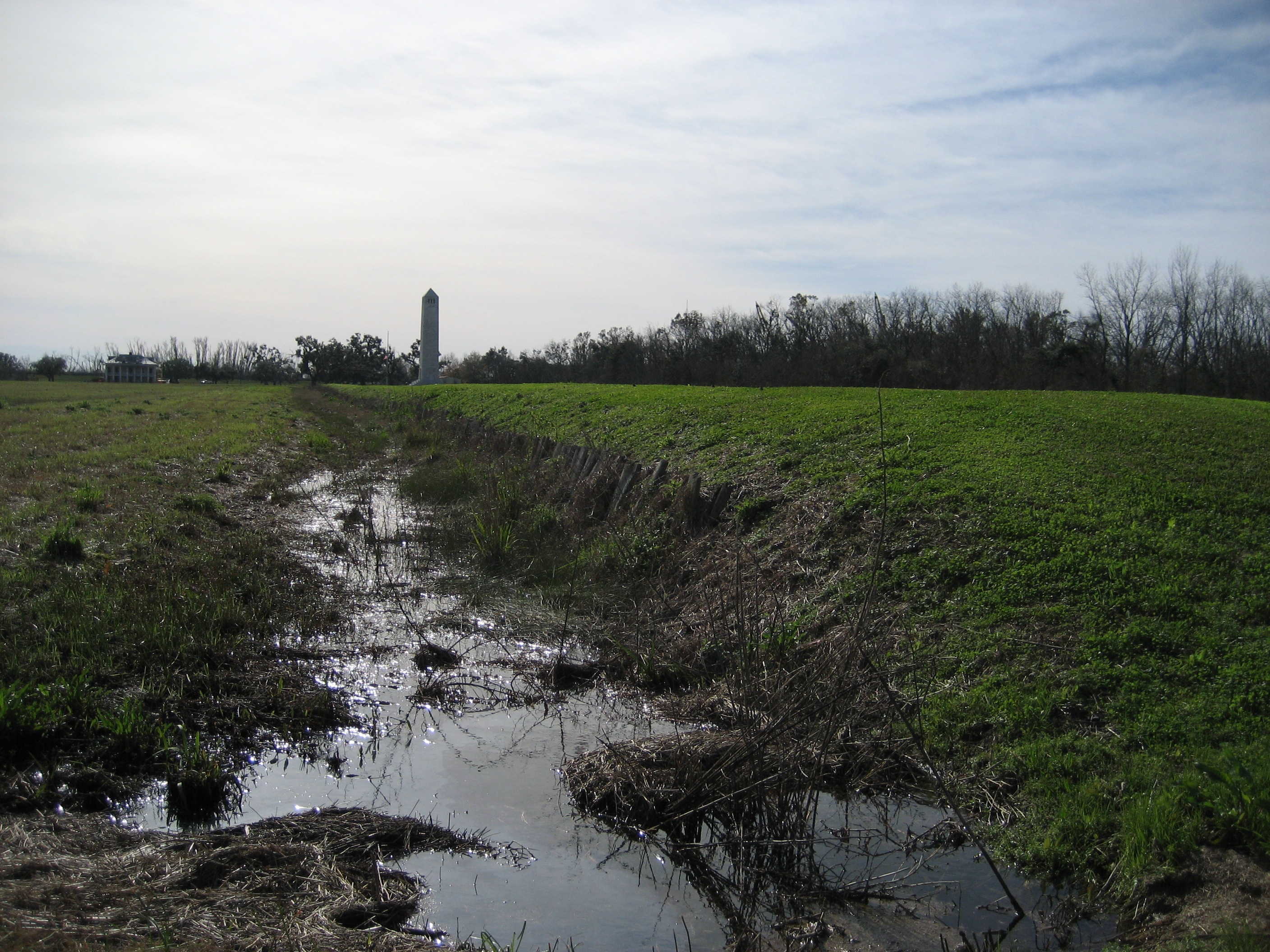
The remains of the canal today, with the finished Chalmette Monument in the background.
