= Battle of Rappahannock River =

Coordinates: 37.642°N 76.477°W

- Part of the War of 1812
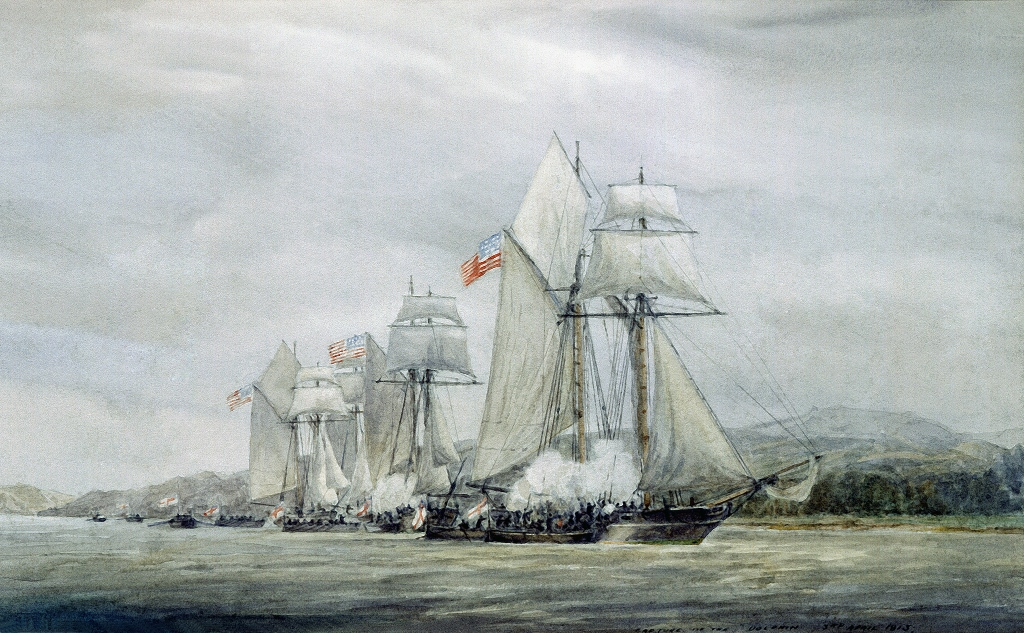
- Capture of the Dolphin, 3rd April 1813, by Irwin John Bevan
Date	April 3, 1813
Location	Rappahannock River, Virginia
Result	British victory

Belligerents
United States	United Kingdom

Commanders and leaders
(United States) William Stafford (surrendered)	(United Kingdom) James Polkinghorne

Strength
4 schooners	17 armed boats

Casualties and losses
6 killed 10 wounded ~100 captured 4 schooners captured	2 killed 11 wounded 2 armed boats sunk

The Battle of Rappahannock River was fought in 1813 during the War of 1812. A British Royal Navy force blockading the Rappahannock River in Virginia sent several hundred men in boats to attack four American privateers. Ultimately the British were victorious and the American ships were captured.

== Background ==
On April 1, 1813, a British squadron consisting of the ships-of-the-line San Domingo and Marlborough, four frigates Acasta, Narcissus, Maidstone and Statira, two brigs, Mohawk and Fantome and one schooner, Highflyer blockaded the Rappahannock from Lynnhaven Bay. They held several American prizes and were out to capture more so the British commanders prepared a cutting out expedition, where small boats attempt to capture larger vessels at anchor. On the following day, the British dispatched seventeen, pinnaces, barges, launches, and other boats with a few carronades to sail around the bay. Each boat carried up to fifty marines and sailors mainly armed with melee weapons. Lieutenant James Polkinghorne was in command of the boats. While abreast of Windmill Point at about 4:00 pm, the expedition sighted five American vessels and chased them all through the night until losing sight as they passed a turn in the river. The British had difficulty in rowing up the Rappahannock so during the descent twelve of the boats fell far behind leaving only five British craft, one 12-pounder and 105 officers and men to make the attack.

Four of the pursued ships were schooners under the command of privateer William Josephus Stafford in the twelve gun Dolphin. The others were Lynx of six guns, Racer of six guns and Arab of seven guns. In all, the American schooners mounted 30 guns with 160 men. Most or all of these vessels were built in Baltimore. Captain Stafford had little alternative but to scuttle the schooners or fight. He decided to offer resistance and anchored his ships in line of battle with portside guns facing the mouth of the Rappahannock where the British would originate.

== Battle ==
The reconstructed Lynx off California being saluted by Lady Washington.

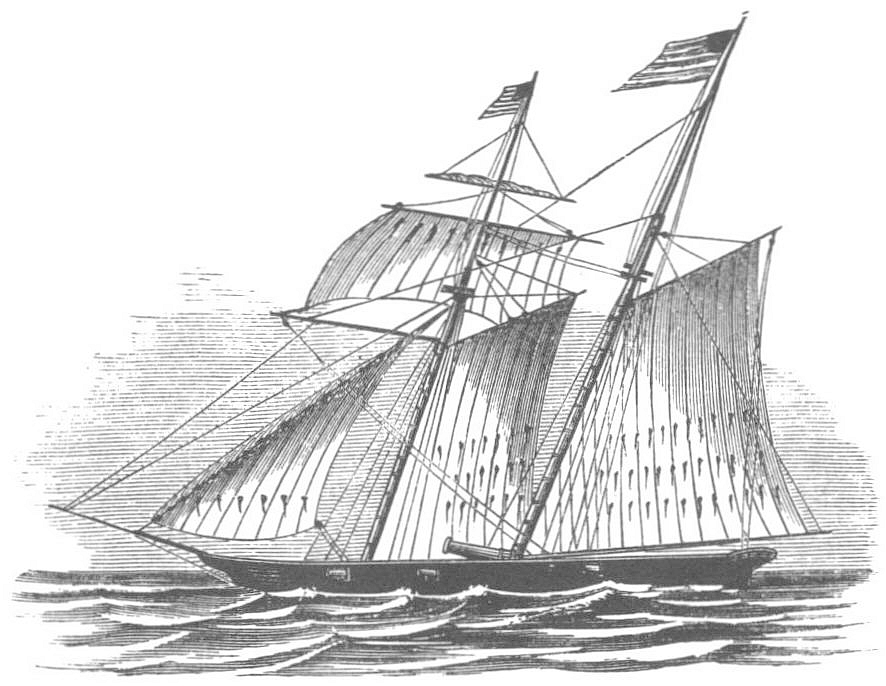
A Baltimore clipper, very similar to the American vessels captured on the Rappahannock.

The largest of the American ships was Arab of over 380 tons but with a crew of only forty-five men, she was sternmost in line and was considered to be the most "war like" of the four. Dolphin of 300 tons was headmost and she was Captain Stafford's flagship, carrying ninety-eight men into battle. When the British came within sight of the American line, they first stopped to wait for the wind and the remaining twelve boats to come up so Polkinghorne took the time to rally his men. After a few more minutes the wind was still calm so the lieutenant ordered an attack in order to deny the Americans time to prepare defenses or escape. Polkinghorne sent a boat with the 12-pounder forward to commence an artillery duel with the intention of delaying the Americans but this failed when Stafford's ships all opened fire with a combined broadside. Lieutenant Polkinghorne decided to stop waiting at this point and he led his boats directly for the center two American ships, Racer and Lynx, each of 280 tons and with crews totaling seventy-six men. As the British closed range the Americans fired another broadside so Polkinghorne had his men alter course and head for Arab. When the British boats drew near there were three left, two having been hit and sunk by American fire.

The remaining Britons boarded while shouting various phrases, Arab tacked to try to bring her starboard guns into battle but she was boarded before achieving this and so her commander ran her aground on the riverbank. Racer and Lynx were quickly taken, their crews surrendered as the British climbed on deck, others jumped over the side and escaped capture. When Polkinghorne went for Dolphin, Captain Stafford put up a stubborn fight and it reportedly took fifteen minutes to secure the vessel. Five Americans were wounded before Dolphin struck her colors and ended the battle, though casualties from the other privateers amounted to six killed and five more wounded. By the time the fighting was over the remaining British boats arrived and assisted in taking over 100 prisoners.

== Aftermath ==
Polkinghorne reported that only two of his men were killed and eleven wounded, including himself. American newspaper reports in Niles Register at first claimed that fifty Britons had been killed, later reducing that claim to nineteen dead. A review by British and American historians later put the British losses at two dead and eleven wounded with American losses as sixteen killed and wounded. The battle lasted in between fifteen minutes and two hours according to various accounts. Captain Stafford later returned to Baltimore. He was treated well in captivity partly due to his good treatment towards British prisoners from his captured prizes. Lynx was taken into British service as Mosquidobit and was sold out of the Royal Navy in 1820. A replica of Lynx now spends its time on an educational mission sailing back and forth between the Great Lakes and Florida's Gulf Coast. Racer became Shelburne and Dolphin retained her name as Dolphin. It was difficult for the British to free Arab and though they eventually succeeded, the vessel was apparently badly damaged and was not commissioned for British service.

== See also ==
- Battle of Lake Borgne
