= HMS Highflyer (1813) =

History

United States
- Name: Highflyer
- Launched: 1811
- Fate: Captured by HMS Poictiers on 9 January 1813, commissioned as HMS Highflyer.

United Kingdom
- Name: HMS Highflyer
- Commissioned: 1813
- Honours and awards: Naval General Service Medal with clasp "April & May Boat Service 1813"
- Fate: Captured by USS President on 23 September 1813; not taken into service.

General characteristics
- Type: Schooner
- Tons burthen: 14441/94 (bm); 138 by American calculation
- Length: 80 ft 0 in (24.4 m) (overall); 67 ft 10 5/8 in (20.7 m) (overall)
- Beam: 18 ft 10 in (5.74 m)
- Depth of hold: 8 ft 0 in (2.44 m)
- Propulsion: Sail
- Complement: 72
- Armament: As privateer: 1 × 12-pounder long gun + 4 × 9-pounder carronades; British service: 8 cannons

HMS Highflyer was originally an American privateer schooner built in 1811. As a privateer she took several British vessels as prizes. The Royal Navy captured her in 1813. She then participated in several raids on the Chesapeake and coastal Virginia before the Americans recaptured her later in 1813.

== As a privateer ==
Highflyer was built in Dorchester County, Maryland in 1811, and operated out of Baltimore. She was originally set up for six long nine-pounder cannon. She apparently sailed with one long 12-pounder and four 9-pounder carronades.

Under Captain John Gavet, on 21 July 1812 she captured the British merchantman Jamaica, with seven guns and 21 men, and Diana. The next day, she captured Mary Ann, with 12 guns and 18 men. On 26 August, she sent into Baltimore the schooner Harriet, of four guns, which had been sailing from New Providence to Havana. On her second cruise, under Captain Jeremiah Grant, she captured the brig Porgie, sailing from Antigua, and the brig Burchall, traveling from Barbados to Demerara, plus a number of coasting vessels operating among islands of the West Indies. She also took the brig Fernando, which was, however, retaken. Lastly, she sent into Charleston the ten-gun brig Active.

== Capture ==
On 9 January 1813 HMS Poictiers, under Captain John Beresford, with HMS Acasta assisting, captured Highflyer. She was armed with five guns and had a crew of 72 men when the British captured her on her way back from the West Indies. The Admiralty took Highflyer into service with the Royal Navy as an eight-gun schooner, still under her original name.

== Royal Navy service ==
The Royal Navy commissioned her under Lieutenant Theophilus Lewis, and initially employed Highflyer in the Chesapeake as a tender to Sir John Borlase Warren's HMS San Domingo. On 13 April 1813, Warren's squadron, consisting of Highflyer, and more importantly San Domingo, Marlborough, Maidstone, Statira, Fantome, and Mohawk, pursued four schooners into the Rappahannock River. The British sent boats 15 miles (24 km) upriver before capturing their prey. The British took three of the schooners into service. The six-gun Chesapeake schooner Lynx became Mosquidobit. Of the three Baltimore schooners, Racer became Shelburne; Dolphin retained her name; lastly, it is not clear what became of Arab, which with Dolphin, put up some resistance. Dolphin had been on a privateering cruise; consequently she carried 100 men and 12 guns.

On 29 April, boats from Dolphin, Dragon, Fantome, Highflyer, Maidstone, Marlborough, Mohawk, Racer and Statira went up the Elk River in Chesapeake Bay under the personal command of Rear-Admiral Sir George Cockburn. Their objective was to destroy five American ships and stores, and by some accounts, a cannon foundry at French Town. This took until 3 May 1813 to complete. On the way, after a battery at Havre de Grace fired on them from the shore, a landing party destroyed the battery and burned much of the town. In 1847 the Admiralty issued 48 clasps marked "April & May Boat Service 1813" to the Naval General Service Medal for the action.

On 30 April Highflyer supported Fantome and Mohawk's boats when the vessels gathered cattle for the fleet's use, paying with bills on the Victualling Office. The next day, the vessels secured more cattle from Spesutie (Spesucie) Island just south of Havre de Grace at the mouth of the Susquehanna River.

At some point in May, Highflyer captured the American lookout boat Betsey, under the command of Captain Smith. Highflyer burnt her capture and took her crew aboard.

On 23 May 1813, the Virginia privateer schooner Roger departed Norfolk under Captain Roger Quarles, an experienced merchant seaman. The 188-ton vessel carried 14 guns and 120 men. Some days after leaving Norfolk, Roger and Highflyer encountered each other and an indecisive, though prolonged, fight ensued. At the time of this encounter, Highflyer carried five guns and a crew of 50. After suffering the death of Lieutenant Lewis, and two other men, as well as twelve men wounded (two of whom would die later), as well as damage to her sails, Highflyer was unable to pursue Roger as she sailed off. During the fight, two men from Betsey were able to escape in a boat and get to land. After the fight, the British gave Smith and the remainder of his crew a boat in which they were able to get to Norfolk. Lieutenant William Hutchinson replaced Lewis as commander of Highflyer.

On 11 July, a squadron under the command of Rear-Admiral George Cockburn in Sceptre, and comprising Romulus, Fox, Nemesis, Conflict and Cockchafer and Highflyer, "tenders", anchored off Ocracoke Island, on the North Carolina coast. The next day they landed troops under Lieutenant Colonel Napier of the 102nd Regiment of Foot. The two tenders and number of smaller vessels were in the third division.

The squadron faced resistance from a brig and a schooner, the only American armed vessels. The first division, under Lieutenant Westphall, came in under covering fire from Congreve rockets and captured the two American vessels. These two were Atlas and Anaconda, both letters of marque. Anaconda was a brig-sloop of 18 long 9-pounder guns and a crew of 160, with a home port of New York City. Atlas, of 10 guns and 240 tons, had a home port of Philadelphia. Both subsequently entered the Royal Navy. Anaconda retained her own name; Atlas became the 14-gun schooner St Lawrence.

While the navy was capturing the American vessels, the troops captured Portsmouth and Ocracoke islands.

== Return to US control ==
USS President recaptured Highflyer on 23 September 1813 off Nantucket Sound. President's captain, John Rodgers, had captured British recognition signals and so was able to decoy Highflyer alongside. He then captured her without firing a shot, together with a number of despatches and more British signals. A prize crew took Highflyer to Newport, Rhode Island; Hutchinson remained a prisoner on board President. The Americans did not take Highflyer into service.
