= HMS Shelburne (1813) =

History

United States
- Name: Racer
- Owner: George J. Brown, John G. Brown, George P. Stephenson & William Hollins
- Builder: Talbot Co., Baltimore, Maryland
- Launched: 1811
- Commissioned: 21 July 1812 (Comm. # 452)
- Homeport: Baltimore, Massachusetts
- Fate: Captured April 1813

United Kingdom
- Name: HMS Racer
- Acquired: By capture, 3 April 1813
- Honours and awards: Naval General Service Medal with clasp "April & May Boat Service 1813" (as Racer)
- Fate: Unknown

General characteristics
- Type: Schooner
- Tons burthen: 230 (bm)
- Length: 99 ft 7 1/4 in (30.359 m)
- Beam: 22 ft 4 3/4 in (6.826 m)
- Depth of hold: 10 ft 7 3/8 in (3.235 m)
- Sail plan: Schooner
- Complement: 30
- Armament: Racer: 2 × 12-pounder guns; 4 × 9-pounder carronades; Shelburne: 2 × 6-pounder guns; 10 × 12-pounder carronades

HMS Shelburne was the American letter of marque schooner Racer, built in Baltimore in 1811 and captured by the British in 1813. She served on the American coast, capturing the American brig Frolic. She also captured some merchantmen and was sold in Britain in 1817.

== Letter of Marque ==
Racer commissioned in August 1812, under Captain Daniel Chaytor and first lieutenant Thomas West. She was a trader, and made one voyage to Bordeaux, leaving Baltimore in August 1812 and returning in January 1813 with a cargo of brandy, dry goods, and the like. She sailed for Bordeaux again in March, with a cargo of coffee, cotton, and sugar.

== Battle of Rappahannock River ==
On 13 April 1813, Sir John Borlase Warren's squadron, consisting of HMS San Domingo, Marlborough, Maidstone, Statira, Fantome, Mohawk and Highflyer pursued four schooners into the Rappahannock River in Virginia. The British sent 17 boats 15 miles upriver before capturing their prey.

One of the schooners, Dolphin, had been on a privateering cruise; consequently she carried 98 men and 12 guns. Under her captain, W.S. Stafford, she fought for some two hours before she struck. In the action the British reported they lost two killed and eleven wounded. American newspapers at first claimed that the British had lost 50 men, later reporting that British losses were two boats sunk with nineteen killed and forty wounded. Stafford placed his losses at six killed and ten wounded.

The British took at least three of the schooners into service. There was already an HMS Racer in service so Racer, of six guns and 36 men, became Shelburne. Lynx became Mosquidobit. Dolphin retained her name and became a tender commanded by a Lieutenant George Hutchinson. (Note: Her service career and what became of her at the end of the war is an open question.) Lastly, it is not clear what became of Arab, of seven guns and 45 men, which too had put up some resistance. It was difficult for the British to free Arab and though they eventually succeeded, the vessel was apparently badly damaged and was not commissioned for British service. She was taken to Halifax where the Vice-Admiralty Court condemned her as a prize. In July 1814, prize money remitted from Halifax for Racer, Lynx, Arab and a number of other vessels, was paid. (Note: For Racer, Lynx, Arab, and Flight, the share of a first class petty officer was £6 1s 10½d; for an able seaman it was £2 0s 7½d.)

On 29 April 1813, boats from Dolphin, together with boats from Mohawk, Fantome, Highflyer and Racer, which had not yet been renamed, went up the Chesapeake Bay to Frenchtown to destroy five American ships and stores; they also purchased provisions for the squadron from the locals. This took until 3 May 1813 to complete. On the way back, a battery fired on the British from the shore; a landing party destroyed the battery. The Admiralty would later issue the clasp "April & May Boat Service 1813" for the Naval General Service Medal for the action.

== British service ==
The Admiralty bought Racer for £1,940.11.5d (amended figure) and the British named her for the town of Shelburne, Nova Scotia, commissioning her under Lieutenant David Hope. They also armed her with ten 12-pounder carronades and two 6-pounder guns.

During 1813 Shelburne captured at least three merchant vessels.

- 26 August: recaptured the Eliza.
- 11 October: captured the Margelt.
- 12 October: captured the Fanny.

On 4 March 1814 HMS Epervier and Shelburne sailed with a small convoy for Bermuda and the West Indies. Two days later they ran into a gale that scattered the vessels. Some, such as Monmouth were delayed in their arrival at Bermuda.

After the two warships parted ways, Epervier encountered the USS Peacock. The subsequent engagement resulted in the capture of Epervier.

Having left Epervier, Shelburne joined the frigate Orpheus. Together, on 20 Apr 1814, they captured the 18-gun sloop USS Frolic. Outnumbered and outgunned, Frolic beat away to southward, making for the coast of Cuba. During the six-hour chase, Frolic's men labored to lighten their ship. They cut away the starboard anchor and cast overboard the guns mounted on her port side. Eventually, Hope, seeing Frolic heel and realizing that she was unarmed on her port side, came up prepared to fire a broadside on Frolic's unarmed side.

Frolic surrendered to Shelburne as Orpheus approached; by this time the vessels were about 15 miles off Matanzas. The British took Frolic into service as Florida. (Note: One quarter of Hope's share of the prize money, was worth £45 12s 4d; one quarter of a sixth-class share, that of an ordinary seaman, was worth £1 6s 1d.) She had been armed with two long 18-pounder guns and twenty 32-pounder carronades. The 18-pounder still on her turned out to be of British make and may have come from Macedonian.

The subsequent court martial acquitted Frolic's commander, Joseph Bainbridge, his officers and his crew, of the loss of his ship. (Note: Joseph Bainbridge was the brother of another noted US commander, Commodore William Bainbridge. Despite the acquittal, J. Bainbridge did not serve at sea again.) Hope was promoted to commander in June, but remained with Shelburne.

In October Lieutenant William Hamilton assumed command temporarily, while Hope served as an aide to Admiral Alexander Cochrane in Tonnant. On 8 November 1814, the British contingent commanded by Edward Nicolls withdrew from Fort San Carlos, which lay 14 miles to the west of Pensacola, along with the British squadron commanded by Captain Gordon, comprising several vessels, including the Shelburne. Thereafter, the Shelburne was in the proximity of the Tonnant, within a fleet of fifty British warships and over 8,000 soldiers in preparations for the Battle of New Orleans, anchored between Ship Island and Cat Island. In 1821, under the rules of prize-money, she shared in the distribution of head-money arising from the capture of American gun-boats and sundry bales of cotton at the Battle of Lake Borgne on 14 December 1814. (Note: A first-class share was worth £34 12s 9¼d; a sixth-class share, the share of an ordinary seaman, was worth 7s 10¾d.) (Note: 'Notice is hereby given to the officers and companies of His Majesty's ships Aetna, Alceste, Anaconda, Armide, Asia, Bedford, Belle Poule, Borer, Bucephalus, Calliope, Carron, Cydnus, Dictator, Diomede, Dover, Fox, Gorgon, Herald, Hydra, Meteor, Norge, Nymphe, Pigmy, Ramillies, Royal Oak, Seahorse, Shelburne, Sophie, Thames, Thistle, Tonnant, Trave, Volcano, and Weser, that they will be paid their respective proportions of prize money.')

In February 1815 Shelburne and Anaconda, which was also a former American privateer, cruised off the Florida coast north of Havana.

== Fate ==
On 22 June 1816 Shelburne arrived at Deptford. In October 1817 she was sold to Mr. Brown for £600.
