= HMS San Domingo (1809) =

Ship of the line of the Royal Navy

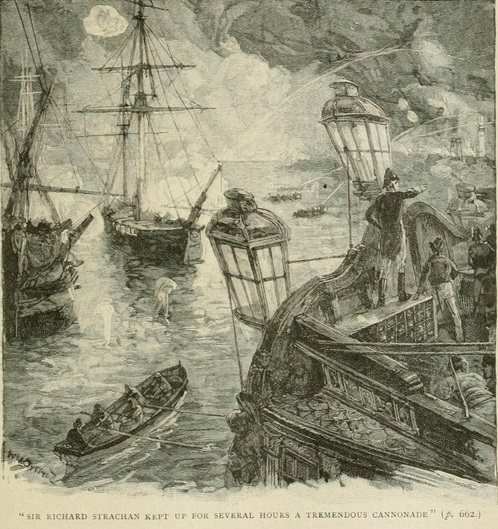
- Sir Richard Strachan on HMS San Domingo, conducting the bombardment of Flushing during the Walcheren Campaign of 1809

History

United Kingdom
- Name: HMS San Domingo
- Ordered: 30 October 1805
- Builder: Woolwich Dockyard
- Laid down: June 1806
- Launched: 3 March 1809
- Fate: Sold, 1816

General characteristics
- Class & type: Modified Courageux-class ship of the line
- Tons burthen: 1820 (bm)
- Length: 180 ft (55 m) (gundeck)
- Beam: 48 ft 0 3/4 in (14.649 m)
- Depth of hold: 20 ft 10 in (6.35 m)
- Sail plan: Full-rigged ship
- Armament: Gundeck: 28 × 32-pounder guns; Upper gundeck: 28 × 18-pounder guns; QD: 4 × 12-pounder guns + 10 × 32-pounder carronades; Fc: 4 × 12-pounder guns + 2 × 32-pounder carronades; Poop deck: 6 × 18-pounder carronades

HMS San Domingo was a 74-gun third-rate ship of the line of the Royal Navy, launched on 3 March 1809 at Woolwich. She was sold in 1816.

== Career ==
On 14 August 1812 Admiral Sir John Borlase Warren, sailed to Halifax, Nova Scotia, on San Domingo}, together with Poictiers, Sophie, Magnet, and Mackerel. Magnet disappeared during the voyage and was presumed foundered with all hands.

On 17 January 1813 San Domingo captured the American privateer schooner Teazer.

On 13 April 1813, Sir John Borlase Warren's squadron, consisting of his flagship, San Domingo, and Marlborough, Maidstone, Statira, Fantome, Mohawk, and Highflyer pursued four schooners into the Rappahannock. The British sent boats 15 miles upriver before capturing their prey.

- Arab, of seven guns and 45 men, was run aground and boarded by two boats from Marlborough.
- Lynx, of six guns and 40 men, hauled down her colours when Borlase went alongside her in San Domingo's pinnace.
- Racer, of six guns and 38 men, was boarded and carried, after a sharp, resistance, by the San Domingo's pinnace.
- Dolphin, of 12 guns and 98 men surrendered after Racer's guns were turned on her. Dolphin resisted for two hours but then was boarded by men from Statira's large cutter and Maidstone's launch.

The British lost two men killed and 11 wounded. The Americans lost six killed and 10 wounded.

The British took three of the schooners into service. The Chesapeake schooner Lynx became Mosquidobit. Of the three Baltimore schooners, the Racer became Shelburne; Dolphin retained her name; lastly, it is not clear what became of Arab.

San Domingo was driven ashore at Halifax, Nova Scotia, British North America, during a gale on 12 November 1813. She was refloated, repaired, and returned to service.

== Fate ==
San Domingo was sold out of the Navy in 1816.
