= USS Viper (1806) =

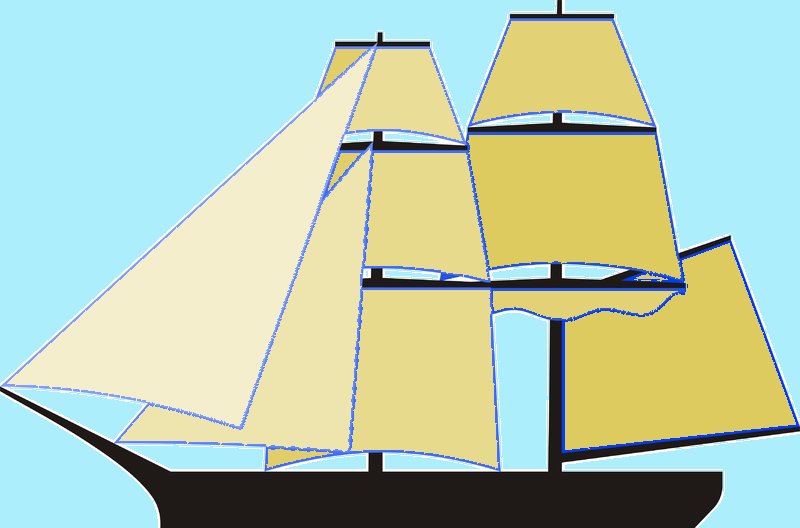
- Configuration of typical brig-sloop

History

United States
- Name: USS Viper
- Builder: Josiah Fox
- Laid down: date unknown
- Christened: originally as the cutter Ferret
- Completed: between 1806 and 1809 at the Gosport Navy Yard
- Commissioned: 18 April 1809 as the USS Ferret
- Captured: 17 January 1813 by the 32-gun frigate HMS Narcissus

United Kingdom
- Name: HMS Mohawk
- Acquired: By capture 17 January 1813
- Honours and awards: Naval General Service Medal with clasp "28 April Boat Service 1813"
- Fate: Sold 1814

General characteristics
- Type: Brig
- Tons burthen: 143, or 148 (bm)
- Length: 73 ft 0 in (22.3 m)
- Beam: 23 ft 8 in (7.2 m)
- Depth of hold: 7 ft 6 in (2.3 m)
- Sail plan: Brig
- Complement: 64 (American service)
- Armament: US service: 12 guns; British service: 10 guns

USS Viper – commissioned as USS Ferret – was a brig serving the United States Navy during the early days of the republic. Viper was assigned to enforce the Embargo Act of 1807 along the U.S. East Coast. During the War of 1812, while cruising in the Caribbean, she was captured by the more heavily armed British warships. She then served the Royal Navy as HMS Mohawk until the Navy sold her in 1814. While in British service she served in several actions that earned her crew the Naval General Service Medal,

== Built in Virginia ==
The first ship to be named Viper by the Navy, was originally the cutter Ferret. She was designed by the naval architect Josiah Fox and built at the Gosport Navy Yard, Portsmouth, Virginia, between 1806 and 1809, and was commissioned under her old name on 18 April 1809, Lieutenant Christopher Gadsden Jr., in command.

== Enforcing the Embargo Act of 1807 ==
Shortly after her commissioning, Ferret cruised along the coast of the Carolinas and Georgia to aid in the enforcement of the Embargo Act of 1807. She was renamed Viper during re-rigging as a brig at the Washington Navy Yard in 1809 and 1810, and from Washington sailed to New Orleans, Louisiana, arriving there on 18 March 1811. Viper remained off the U.S. Gulf Coast enforcing the Embargo Act until the outbreak of the War of 1812.

== Captured during the War of 1812 ==
During the war, Viper proved woefully inadequate in deep water operations against the larger, more heavily gunned British warships. On 17 January 1813 the 32-gun frigate HMS Narcissus captured Viper off the coast of Belize, British Honduras and took her to New Providence in the Bahama Islands. At the time of her capture Viper was armed with 12 guns, had a crew of 93 men and had been cruising for seven weeks off Havana, having made no captures. (Note: In March 1816 there was a final payment of prize money for the capture of Viper. A first-class share was worth £26 7s 3d; a sixth-class share, the portion of an ordinary seaman, was worth 6s.)

== British service ==
Renamed Mohawk by the Royal Navy, she was commissioned under Commander Henry Dilkes Byng for operations in the Chesapeake.

Mohawk was one of the vessels of Admiral Sir John Borlase Warren's squadron that contributed boats and men to the cutting out expedition up the Rappahannock River on 13 April 1813. The British party under Lieutenant J. Puckinghorne rowed 15 miles upriver to capture four American letter of marque schooners: Dolphin, Lynx, Racer and Arab. Although the British sustained a number of casualties, Mohawk herself sustained none.

The British took three of the schooners into service. Lynx became Mosquidobit. Racer became Shelburne, and Dolphin retained her name. It was difficult for the British to free Arab and though they eventually succeeded, the vessel was apparently badly damaged and was not commissioned for British service. She was taken to Halifax, Nova Scotia, where the Vice admiralty court condemned Arab, of 350 tons, Fitch, master. She had been carrying a cargo of flour.

Mohawk was among the vessels benefiting from a number of captures. Announcements of prize money and head-money include:

Name	Date	First-class share	Sixth-class share
Dart	18 March 1813	£3 3d	3½d
Louisiana and Nautilus	20 March 1813	£1 9s 9d	2½d
Revenge	28 March 1813	£10 11s 9d	1s 1d
Vesta	18 April 1813	£1 15s 10d	2½d
Dolphin	3 April 1813	£16 14s 5d	1s 10d

On 29 April 1813, boats from Mohawk, together with boats from Fantome, Dolphin, and Highflyer and Racer, which had not yet been renamed, went up the Chesapeake Bay to Frenchtown to destroy five American ships and stores; they also purchased provisions for the squadron from the locals. This took until 3 May 1813 to complete. On the way back, a battery fired on the British from the shore; a landing party destroyed the battery. The Admiralty would later issue the clasp "28 April Boat Service 1813" for the Naval General Service Medal to all surviving claimants from the action.

Mohawk was among the ships benefiting from the proceeds of the capture of the American ships Rolla (29 May) and Protectress (18 June). She was also among the vessels benefiting from the capture of the Spanish brig St. Iago (11 June 1813), the American schooner Surveyor (12 June), the American ships Governor Strong and Emily (12 June), Star (14 June), and Herman (21 June).

On 14 July 1813 the brigs Contest and Mohawk spotted the American schooner USS Asp and the USS Scorpion, and immediately gave chase. Scorpion made good her escape up the Chesapeake, but Asp's poor sailing qualities forced her to put back into the Yeocomico River. Contest and Mohawk anchored off the bar and prepared a boat expedition.

Contest's cutter, under the command of Lieutenant Curry, and Mohawk's cutter, under the command of Lieutenant Hutchinson, followed Asp three or four miles up the Yeocomico. Asp was armed with one long 18-pounder gun and two 18-pounder carronades, together with some swivels. She had a crew of 20 men under the command of Midshipman Sigourney.

As the British boats approached, Asp cut her cable and tried to escape further up the river. The American account states that three British boats attacked but were repelled. Then two other British boats joined the first three for a second attempt, which proved successful. The Americans fought valiantly in spite of the lopsided odds. Midshipman Sigourney and ten of his 20-man crew were killed defending their ship while the remainder escaped ashore when further resistance became hopeless.

Despite fire from Asp and from militia on the shore, the British captured Asp within a short time, but at a cost of two men killed and six wounded, including Lieutenant Curry (slightly). The British set fire to Asp and retired. At that point, Asp's second in command, Midshipman H. McClintock, led the remnants of Asp's crew back on board, extinguished the flames, and put her back in fighting trim. For whatever reason, the British declined to renew the combat.

== Fate ==
Commander Henry Litchfield assumed command in July 1813. Mohawk was sold in 1814.
