= Naval General Service Medal (1847) =

British Royal Navy commendation

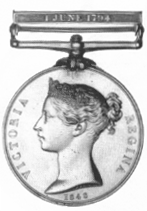
- Obverse and reverse of the medal.
- Type: Campaign medal
- Awarded for: Campaign service
- Description: Silver disk, 36mm diameter
- Presented by: United Kingdom of Great Britain and Ireland
- Eligibility: Royal Navy
- Campaign: Naval Actions 1793–1840
- Clasps: 231 authorised, 221 issued
- Established: 1847
- Total: 20,933
- Ribbon: 32mm, white with dark blue edges

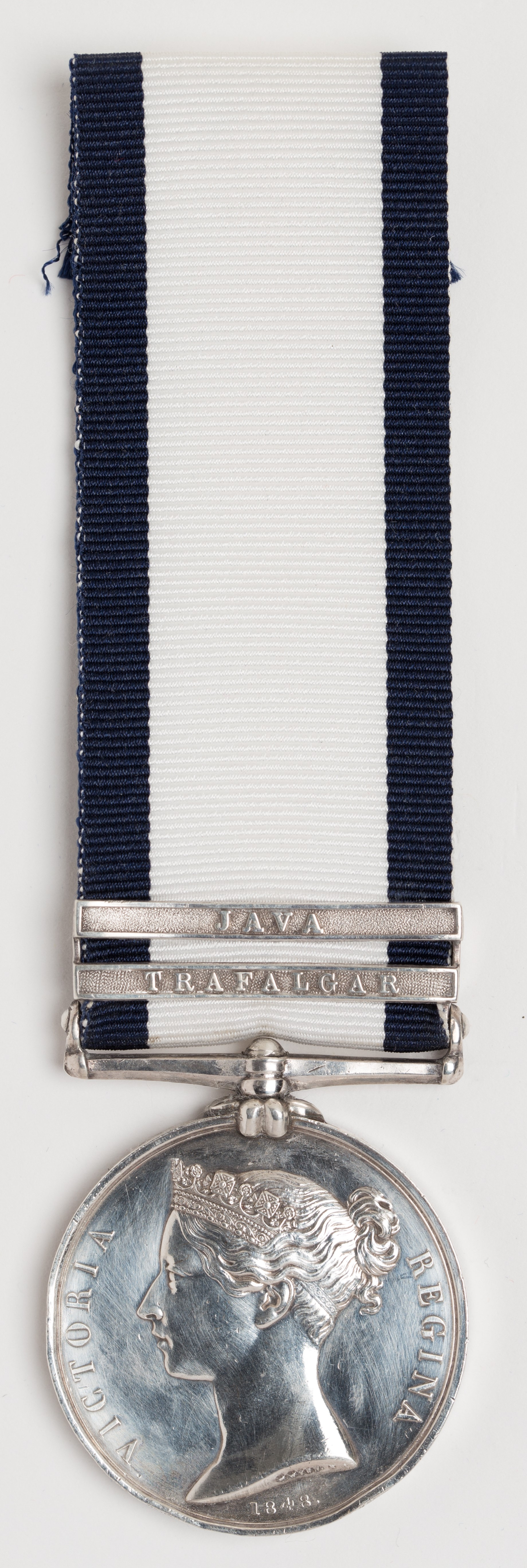
Medal awarded to Corporal Henry Castle, Royal Marines, with clasps ‘Trafalgar’ (HMS Britannia) and 'Java' (HMS Hussar)

The Naval General Service Medal (NGSM) was a campaign medal approved in 1847, and issued to officers and men of the Royal Navy in 1849. The final date for submitting claims was 1 May 1851. Admiral Thomas Bladen Capel was one of the members of the board that authorised the medal.

The NGSM was awarded retrospectively for various naval actions during the period 1793–1840, a period that included the French Revolutionary Wars, the Napoleonic Wars and the Anglo-American War of 1812. Each battle or campaign covered by the medal was represented by a clasp on the ribbon. The medal was never issued without a clasp, 231 of which were sanctioned. The clasps covered a variety of actions, from boat service, ship to ship skirmishes, to major fleet actions such as the Battle of Trafalgar.

This medal and its army counterpart, the Military General Service Medal, were amongst the first real British campaign medals, issued to all ranks for serving in combat actions.

== Eligibility ==
The medal was only awarded to surviving claimants. A combination of factors, from general illiteracy to limited publicity for the new medal meant that many who had survived did not apply for it. While next of kin could not apply on behalf of a deceased relative, they did receive the medal in cases where the claimant had died between their application and actual award.

The belated nature of the award meant that, for many clasps, substantially fewer medals were issued than the number of those eligible. Frequently the number of claimants for individual clasps was reckoned in single figures, and for ten clasps there were no claimants.

Sir John Hindmarsh and Admiral of the Fleet Sir James Gordon were awarded medals with seven clasps, the most awarded to any individual. Four men qualified for six clasps and fourteen for five clasps.

A baby born on board HMS Tremendous during the battle of the Glorious First of June, christened Daniel Tremendous McKenzie, applied for and received the medal with the '1 June 1794' clasp. Jane Townshend, a woman aboard HMS Defiance at the Battle of Trafalgar, had her application for the medal initially approved. The medal was not finally awarded however, with the roll of recipients endorsed "upon further consideration this can not be allowed". An award may have set a precedent for claims by other women, mainly wives of sailors present during naval actions.

A total of 126 awards were made to officers and men of the British Army present on board HM's ships at qualifying actions. This included 26 with the 'Copenhagen 1801' clasp and 50 with the 'Syria' clasp. Of these recipients, 8 officers and 18 men also received the Military General Service Medal.

The Admiralty awarded 20,933 medals in total. Of these, 15,577 went to individuals who received a single clasp.

== Appearance ==
The medal, designed by William Wyon, is of silver and 1.4 inches (36 mm) in diameter.

- Obverse: a left facing effigy of Queen Victoria with the inscription "VICTORIA REGINA" and the date “1848”.
- Reverse: The figure of Britannia, holding a trident, seated on a seahorse.
- Naming: The name of the recipient is impressed on the rim in block Roman capitals. Medals to officers and warrant officers also include the recipient's rank.
- Ribbon: The 1.25 inches (32 mm) wide ribbon is white, with dark blue edges, based on the ribbon previously used for the Naval Gold Medal.

== Clasps ==
Initially, clasps were to be awarded for eighteen Gold Medal actions, and for four amphibious operations undertaken with the army. In late 1848, a further 208 clasps were added.

A total of 231 clasps were authorised, including 176 for specific actions and 55 for Boat Service, that is service in ships' boats when boarding enemy ships or as part of a shore raiding party.

Whilst the medals were manufactured by the Royal Mint, the clasps and the smaller components of the medal were subcontracted to Hunt and Roskell.

=== French Revolutionary Wars ===
Clasp	Battle or action	Date	Comments
Nymphe 18 June 1793	Capture of French frigate Cléopâtre	18 June 1793	Britain vs. France
Crescent 20 Octr. 1793	Capture of French frigate Réunion	20 October 1793	Britain vs. France
Zebra 17 March 1794	Capture of Fort Saint Louis (Martinique)	20 March 1794	Britain vs. France
17 Mar. Boat Service 1794	Capture of the French frigate Bienvenue and other vessels in Fort Royal Bay (Martinique)	20 March 1794	Britain vs. France
Carysfort 29 May 1794	Recapture of HMS Castor	29 May 1794	Unissued; Britain vs France
1 June 1794	Glorious First of June	1 June 1794	Britain vs France
Romney 17 June 1794	Capture of French frigate Sibylle	17 June 1794	Britain vs France
Blanche 4 Jany. 1795	Capture of French frigate Pique	5 January 1795	Britain vs France
Lively 13 March 1795	Capture of French frigate Tourterelle	13 March 1795	Britain vs France
14 March 1795	Naval Battle of Genoa (1795)	14 March 1795	Britain & Naples vs France
Mosquito 9 June 1795	Capture of privateer	9 June 1795	Unissued (vessel and crew lost soon after)
16–17 June 1795	Cornwallis's Retreat	17 June 1795	Britain vs France
23 June 1795	Battle of Groix	23 June 1795	Britain vs France
Dryad 13 June 1796	Capture of Proserpine	13 June 1796	Britain vs France
St. Vincent	Battle of Cape St Vincent (1797)	14 February 1797	Britain vs Spain
San Fiorenzo 8 March 1797	Capture of Résistance	9 March 1797	Britain vs France
29 May Boat Service 1797	Boats of Minerve and Lively capture French corvette Mutine	29 May 1797	Britain vs France
Camperdown	Battle of Camperdown	11 October 1797	Britain vs Holland
Nile	Battle of the Nile	1–3 August 1798	Britain vs France
12 Octr. 1798	Battle of Tory Island	12 October 1798	Britain vs France
Telegraph 18 March 1799	Capture of French privateer Hirondelle	18 March 1799	Unissued; Britain vs France
Arrow 13 Sepr. 1799	Capture of Draak and Gier	13 September 1799	Britain vs Batavian Republic
Wolverine 13 Sepr. 1799	Capture of Draak and Gier	13 September 1799	Unissued; Britain vs Batavian Republic
Courier 23 Novr. 1799	Capture of French privateer Guerrier	23 November 1799	Britain vs. France
Egypt	Battle of Abukir (1801), Battle of Alexandria (1801), Siege of Alexandria (1801)	March – September 1801	Britain vs France
Copenhagen	Battle of Copenhagen (1801)	2 April 1801	Britain vs Denmark-Norway
Gut of Gibraltar 12 July 1801	Battle of Algeciras Bay	12 July 1801	Britain vs France & Spain

=== Napoleonic Wars ===
Clasp	Battle or action	Date	Comments
Beaver 31 March 1804	Boats of Scorpion and Beaver captured the Dutch brig Atalante	31 March 1804	Unissued; Britain vs Batavian Republic
Scorpion 31 March 1804	Boats of Scorpion and Beaver captured the Dutch brig Atalante	31 March 1804	Britain vs Batavian Republic
San Fiorenzo 14 Feby. 1805	Capture of Psyché	14 February 1805	Britain vs France
Trafalgar	Battle of Trafalgar	21 October 1805	Britain vs France & Spain
4 Novr. 1805	Battle of Cape Ortegal	4 November 1805	Britain vs France
St. Domingo	Battle of San Domingo	6 February 1806	Britain vs France
Blanche 18 July 1806	Capture of French frigate Guerriere	18 July 1806	Britain vs France
21 Jan. Boat Service 1807	Boats of Galatea vs Lynx	21 January 1807	Britain vs France
19 April Boat Service 1807	Boats of Richmond capture a privateer	19 April 1807	Unissued; Britain vs. France
Ann 24 Novr. 1807	Capture of Spanish lugger privateer and action with ten gunboats and surrender of two	24 November 1807	Unissued; Britain vs Spain
Sappho 2 March 1808	Capture of brig Admiral Yawl	2 March 1808	Britain vs Denmark-Norway
San Fiorenzo 8 March 1808	Capture of Piémontaise	8 March 1808	Britain vs France
28 Nov. Boat Service 1808	Boats of Heureux attack a battery and capture a brig and a schooner	29 November 1808	Britain vs France
Onyx 1 Jany. 1809	Recapture of Manly	1 January 1809	Britain vs the Batavian Republic
Martinique	Invasion of Martinique (1809)	30 January – 24 February 1809	Britain vs France
Basque Roads 1809	Battle of the Basque Roads	11–25 April 1809	Britain vs France
25 July Boat Service 1809	Boats of Fawn in action with a cutter and the schooner Guadaloupe, which they captured	25 July 1809	Unissued; Britain vs France
25 July Boat Service 1809	Boats of Cerberus, Minotaur, Princess Caroline, and Prometheus capture Russian gunboats near Fredrikshamn, Gulf of Finland	25 July 1809	Britain vs Russia
Guadaloupe	Invasion of Guadeloupe (1810)	28 January – 6 February 1810	Britain vs France
Thistle 10 Feby. 1810	Capture of Havik	10 February 1810	Unissued; Britain vs The Netherlands
Boat engagement, Christian 7th	Boats from HMS Christian VII, under Sir Joseph Sydney Yorke, HMS Armide and HMS Seine, attack 9 French gun-boats in the Basque Roads, capturing 1.	13 February 1810	Britain vs France
Arrow 6 April 1811	Action with chasse-marees and batteries off the French coast	6 April 1811	Unissued; Britain vs France
Java	Invasion of Java (1811)	August – September 1811	Britain vs The Netherlands
Lissa	Battle of Lissa (1811)	13 March 1811	Britain vs France and Venice
Anholt 27 March 1811	Battle of Anholt	27 March 1811	Britain vs Denmark-Norway
Off Mardoe 6 July 1812	Battle of Lyngør	6 July 1812	Britain vs Denmark-Norway
21 March Boat Service 1813	Boats of Brev Drageren and Blazer capture gunboats Jonge-Troutman and Liebe	21 March 1813	Britain vs Denmark
St Sebastian	Siege of San Sebastián	August – September 1813	Britain & Portugal vs France
Cyane 16 Jany. 1814	Capture of Alcmène & Iphigénie	16 January 1814	Britain vs France

=== War of 1812 ===
Clasp	Battle or action	Date	Comments
April & May Boat Service 1813	Boats of Marlborough, Maidstone, Dragon, Statira, Dolphin, Fantome, Mohawk, Highflyer, and Racer destroyed cannon foundry at French Town and batteries at Havre-de-Grace	28 April and 5 May	
8 April Boat Service 1814	Boats of La Hogue, Endymion, Maidstone, and Boxer destroyed 27 American vessels and a quantity of stores up the Connecticut River	8 April 1814	
Shannon Wh. Chesapeake	Shannon vs Chesapeake	1 June 1813	
Pelican 14 Augt. 1813	Capture of USS Argus	14 August 1813	
Phoebe 28 March 1814	Capture of USS Essex and Essex Junior (Ex-Atlantic)	28 March 1814	
Cherub 28 March 1814	Capture of USS Essex and Essex Junior (Ex-Atlantic)	28 March 1814	
The Potomac 17 Augt. 1814	Seahorse, Euryalus, Devastation, Aetna, Meteor, Erebus, Fairy, and Anna Maria at Alexandria (Virginia) and destruction of shipping in the Potomac River	17 August 1814	
3 & 6 Sept. Boat Service 1814	Boats on Lake Huron captured American schooners Tigress and Scorpion	3 & 6 September 1814	
14 Dec. Boat Service 1814	Battle of Lake Borgne; boats of 16 British warships captured five American gunboats and a sloop	14 December 1814	
Endymion Wh. President	Endymion vs President	15 January 1815	

=== Later battles or actions ===
Clasp	Battle or action	Date	Comments
Algiers	Bombardment of Algiers	27 August 1816	Britain & The Netherlands vs Dey of Algiers
Navarino	Battle of Navarino	20 October 1827	Britain, France & Russia vs Ottoman Empire
Syria	Syrian War	November 1840	Britain, with Austria, the Ottoman Empire, and Russia vs Egypt; This is the most common clasp, with 6,978 issued
