= Lynx (tall ship) =

2001 interpretation of a topsail schooner

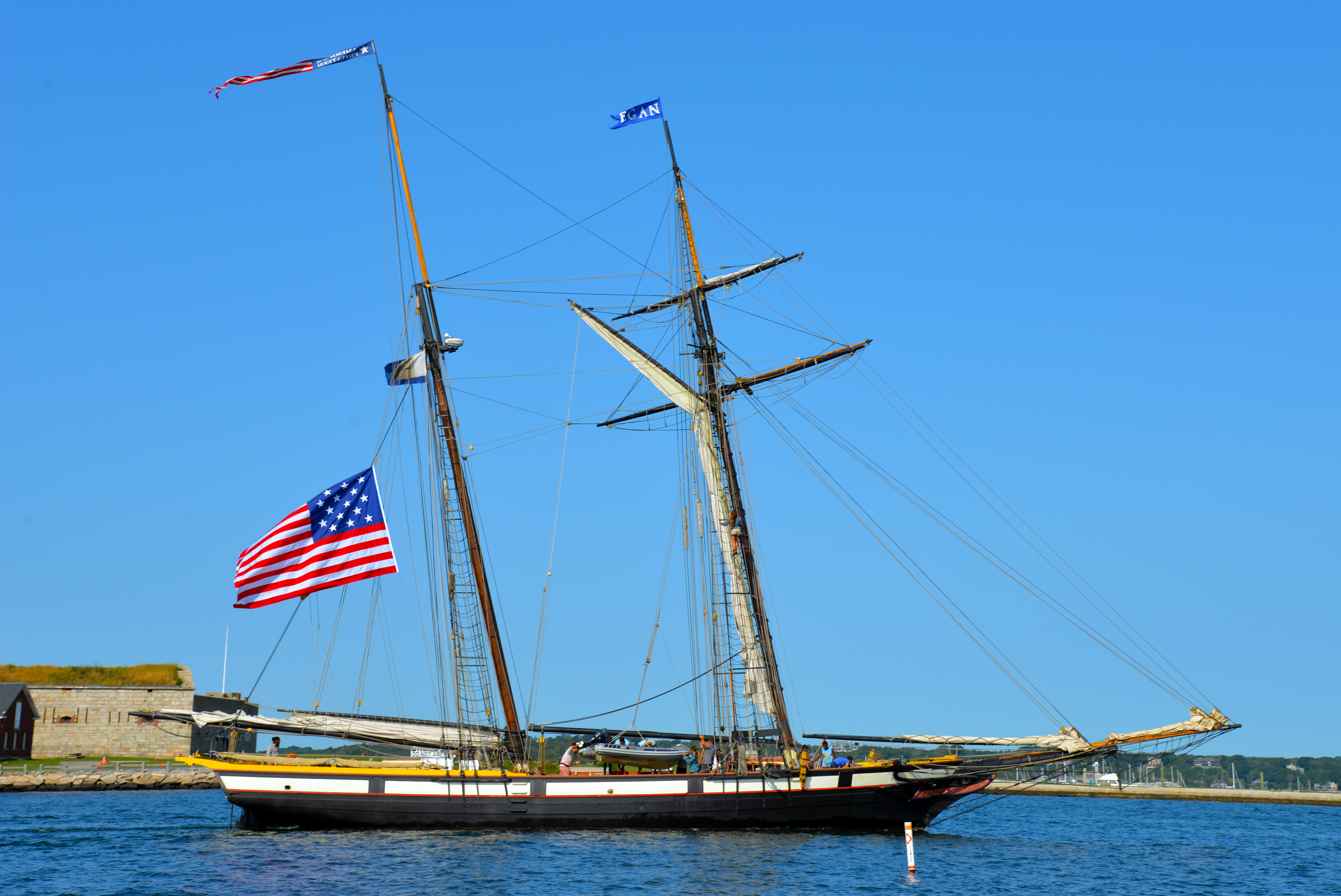
- Schooner Lynx

History

United States
- Name: Lynx
- Builder: Rockport Marine, Rockport, Maine
- Launched: 28 July 2001
- Home port: Nantucket, Massachusetts
- Identification: MMSI number: 369603000; Callsign: WDG4117
- Status: Training vessel

General characteristics
- Type: Schooner
- Displacement: 98.6 long tons (100 t)
- Length: 122 ft (37 m) sparred; 76 ft (23 m) on deck; 72 ft (22 m) w/l
- Beam: 23 ft (7.0 m)
- Height: 94 ft (29 m) at mainmast
- Draft: 8 ft 6 in (2.59 m)
- Sail plan: 4,669 sq ft (433.8 m^{2})
- Armament: 4 × carronades; 4 × swivel guns

Lynx is a square topsail schooner based in Nantucket, Massachusetts. She is an interpretation of an American letter of marque vessel of the same name from 1812. The original Lynx completed one voyage, running the Royal Navy blockade; the British captured her in 1813 at the start of her second voyage and took her into service as HMS Mosquidobit.

== History ==
=== Original Lynx ===
The original Lynx, a privateer ship, was a topsail schooner built in 1812 in the Fells Point neighborhood in Baltimore, Maryland by Thomas Kemp. During the War of 1812 it was captured by the British and sent to England, where it was deconstructed and thoroughly documented by the Royal Navy.

=== Modern Lynx ===
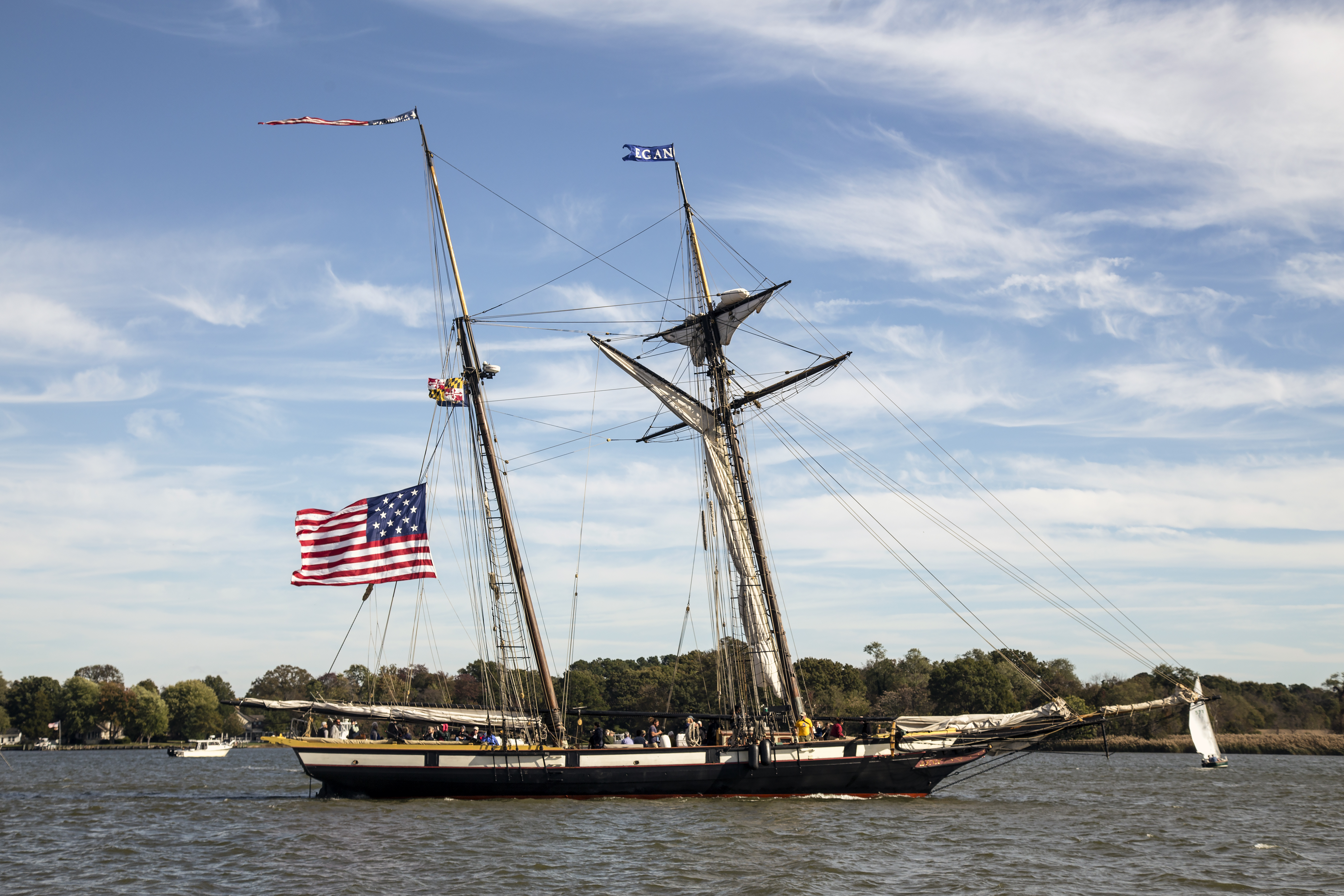
Lynx on the Chester River at Chestertown, Maryland in 2017.

The replica of Lynx sailing today is based on plans of the original Lynx made by the British. It was designed by Melbourne Smith (Note: Smith also designed Californian, Pride of Baltimore, the Brig Niagara, Spirit of Massachusetts, and Federalist.) and built by Taylor Allen and Eric Sewell of Rockport Marine in Rockport, Maine.

The Lynx was launched on July 28, 2001, at Rockport. Her port of registry is Portsmouth, New Hampshire.

Starting from winter 2021, Lynx will spend winters, from November to May, at Morningstar Marinas on St. Simons Island, Georgia. Previously, Lynx stayed in St. Petersburg, Florida during the winter, but relocated after the city began renovation on St. Pete Pier.

== Activities and schedule ==
Lynx anchored off Orchard Beach (Bronx) for the reenactment of the Battle of Pell's Point, 18 October 2026. For this event, she was flying a British ensign.

Today, instead of fighting the British like her original counterpart, she serves as a sailing classroom. Lynx offers an early American history program and a life, earth, and physical science program to schools, where students also learn seamanship and history. Lynx is currently partnered with the Egan Maritime Institute of Nantucket and in the summer sails daily with passengers out of Nantucket; in the spring and fall, she takes groups of students from local schools out for sails. In the winter, Lynx docks at St. Simons Island, Georgia where it offers free deck tours and paid excursions. She often makes additional stops along the route, including in Annapolis, Boothbay, Maine, Cape Charles, Virginia, and Plymouth, Massachusetts.

Lynx also participates in local regattas, notably placing third in the schooner class in the 2018 Opera House Cup.

The Lynx Educational Foundation is a 501(c)(3) non-profit, educational organization, dedicated to hands-on educational programs that teach the history of America's struggle to preserve its independence.

== See also ==
- Ship replica (including a list of ship replicas)
- Nautical terms
- Rigging
- Tall ship
- List of schooners
