= USS Asp =

Three ships of the United States Navy have been named Asp, named for the Asp, which is a small venomous snake.

- USS Asp (1812), was a schooner that served on the Great Lakes during the War of 1812.
- USS Asp (1813), was a schooner that served in Chesapeake Bay.
- USS Asp (YFB-1), was a wooden motor boat which patrolled the coast from 1917 until 1920.
