= Hebe (1810 ship) =

History

United Kingdom
- Name: Hebe
- Namesake: Hebe
- Owner: 1810:John Staniforth; J.S. Blount & Co. ship's husband; 1825:T & J. Brocklebank
- Builder: Thomas Steemson, Paull, Hull,
- Launched: 7 March 1810
- Fate: Wrecked 1833

General characteristics
- Tons burthen: 413, or 41315/94, or 417 or 418, or 425, or 435 or 439 (bm)
- Length: 116 ft 6 in (35.5 m) (overall); 94 ft 6 1/4 in (28.8 m)
- Beam: 28 ft 8 in (8.7 m)
- Propulsion: Sail
- Complement: 1810:40; 1818:20
- Armament: 1810:12 × 12&9-pounder guns; 1810:2 × 9-pounder guns + 10 × 12-poundercarronades; 1815:16 × 12-pounder carronades
- Notes: Two decks

Hebe, built in Hull in 1810, made two notable voyages, one voyage as an extra ship (i.e., under charter) for the British East India Company (EIC), and one voyage transporting convicts to New South Wales. In between, an American privateer captured Hebe, but the British Royal Navy recaptured her. Hebe was wrecked in 1833.

== Career ==
=== EIC voyage ===
Robert Johnson received a letter of marque on 16 May 1810. He sailed from Portsmouth on 9 June, reached Madeira on 25 June and Saugor on 5 December, before arriving at Calcutta on 12 December. Homeward bound, Hebe was at Saugor on 28 January 1811, reached St Helena on 11 May, and arrived at the Downs on 13 July.

=== Capture and recapture ===
The Register of Shipping for 1813 shows Hebe's master as W. Brigham, and her trade as London—Malta, changing to London−Hayti. On 25 July 1812 Hebe left Malta for Smyrna in company with Scipio, James Silk Buckingham, master. The next day, while in they were in the Archipelago, they became becalmed, with Hebe some three miles from Scipio, too far away to render assistance when two Greek pirate vessels attacked Scipio. Scipio was able to repel the attack, sinking one pirate vessel and causing great casualties amongst her attackers, without having any men killed, though half her crew of 25 were wounded.

On 6 January 1813, or 25 January the American privateer Dolphin captured Hebe, of 16 guns and 40 men, and the brig Three Brothers, of ten guns and 25 men. A musket ball wounded Captain W.A. Brigham, of Hebe, and later a powder explosion injured him further. Dolphin had four men wounded and the British nine or 10, including Brigham. Lloyd's List reported that Hebe had been returning to London and Three Brothers to Liverpool, both from Malta. Dolphin captured Hebe some 25 leagues southwest of Cape St Vincent after a single-ship action of two hours. Dolphin captured Three Brothers later.

HMS Shannon recaptured Hebe a few days later, before she could reach America. Dolphin returned to Baltimore on 13 February. The Royal Navy captured her at the Battle of Rappahannock River and took her into service as HMS Dolphin.

In 1813 the EIC had lost its monopoly on the trade between India and Britain. British ships were then free to sail to India or the Indian Ocean under a license from the EIC. Hebe's owners applied for a licence on 16 July 1814, and received it on 20 July. Then in 1815, they again applied for a licence, this time on 10 January 1815; they received the licence that same day.

=== Voyages to Australia and India ===
The Library of New South Wales has Hebe's logbook, James Porter, master, for 1 March 1815 to 27 July 1816, covering a voyage from England to Port Jackson and return. By one account Hebe, Porter, master, arrived at Port Jackson on 5 November 1815 with merchandise. She supposedly left the same day for Calcutta.

The Library also has a second logbook that covers 30 November 1816 to 19 June 1817, and 4 October 1817 to 25 March 1820. The first covers a voyage from England to the Cape, and return. The second covers a voyage from England to Calcutta, Madrid, and return.

On 31 March 1818 representatives of the British and Foreign Bible Society visited Hebe, John Sugden, master, then at London, bound for Bengal. They found that 16 of the 20 men aboard could read. There were two bibles on board and the Society left one more, free of charge.

=== Convict voyage to Port Jackson ===
Hebe, under the command of Captain Thackeray Wetherall, departed England on 31 July 1820. She was at Rio de Janeiro for ten days before arriving at Van Diemen's Land on 31 December. Hebe landed her prisoners at Port Jackson on 11 January 1821. She had embarked 160 male prisoners, one of whom died on the voyage. The 48th Regiment of Foot provided a sergeant and 30 rank-and-file to act as guards; they were under the command of Lieutenant Campbell of the 59th Regiment.

Hebe was intending to sail for England via Batavia in February 1821. However, the Asiatic Journal reported that Hebe, Wetherall, master, arrived at Madras on 4 February and left for Calcutta on 22 March. Hebe, under the command of Captain Maitland (late Wetherall), arrived at Gravesend on 23 January 1822 having been at Bengal on 25 August and Cape of Good Hope 15 November.

=== Other voyage notes ===
Circa 1823 T. & J. Brocklebank purchased Hebe.

In 1823 Hebe, W. Hare, master, carried 287 assisted immigrants from Cork to Quebec under a scheme organized by Peter Robinson. Elizabeth left Cork on 8 July 1823 and arrived at Quebec on 31 August.

On 31 March 1825 Hebe sailed from Alexandria. She arrived at Milford on 31 May with a foul bill of health and had to discharge.

Then on 31 January 1826 Hebe put back into Saint John, New Brunswick in distress. She unloaded and was hauled up for survey. Later that year Hebe underwent a large repair, subsequent to which her burthen increased.

Then around 16 December 1828 Hebe put into Cowes damaged, having lost one man.

== Hebe in the Registers ==
In the table below, "†" indicates that the source is Lloyd's Register. The symbol "‡" indicates that the source is the Register of Shipping, which published from 1800 to 1833. There are clearly many small discrepancies between the two sources, some surely due to differences in the timing of the arrival of updated information.

Year	Master	Owner	Trade	Burthen
1815†	W. Brigham	Staniforth	London—West Indies	413
1815‡	J. Porter	Staniforth	London—(New?) South Wales	417
1820†	J. Porter; Wetherell	Staniforth; Captain & Co.	London—India; Falmouth—B(otany?) Bay	413
1820‡	Sugden	Staniforth	London—Calcutta	417
1823†	W.Hare; Cousins	Brocklebank	Cork–Quebec	413
1825†	Cousins	Brocklebank	London—New Brunswick	413
1825‡	Curzons; W. Boag	Broksbank	London—Bermuda; Liverpool—New Brunswick	417
1830†	W. Boig	Brocklebank	London—New York	439
1830‡	W. Boag	Brocklebank	London—New York	417
1833†	Straughn	Brocklebank	London—Quebec	439
1833‡	Straughn	Brocklebank	London—Quebec	434

== Fate ==
Hebe, Straughan, master, was wrecked on 10 July 1833 near Cape Ray, Newfoundland and Labrador. Her crew was saved.
