= William Josephus Stafford =

William Josephus Stafford (September 12, 1781 – February 24, 1823), also known Jose Guillermo Estifano, was an American sea captain and privateer who served in the War of 1812.

== Biography ==
William Josephus Stafford was born September 12, 1781, probably in Frederick County, Virginia, the oldest of ten children born to Richard Stafford and Catharine Brobeker Stafford. He married Mary Whipple October 1, 1805, in Baltimore, Maryland. Mary was born about 1785 and was said to be the daughter of a William Whipple, and granddaughter of Abraham Whipple. William and Mary Stafford had two sons—William Whipple Stafford born in 1806, and Francis Asbury Stafford born in 1808 —and raised their family in Baltimore. Mary died July 22, 1809, in Baltimore. William married secondly Mary Lauderman Jun 5, 1811, in Baltimore. William Josephus Stafford died February 24, 1823, in Charleston, South Carolina.

He is listed as William Josephus Stafford in the Bible record of his parents, and William J. Stafford in the estate records of his parents, chancery court records, and the census. Transcribed records for Baltimore show his name variously as William Josephus Stafford, William J. Stafford, William S. Stafford, and William L. Stafford. Historical reports of the Battle of the Rappahannock refer to him as William S. Stafford, but the research of Feliciano Gamez Duarte shows that he used that as an alias, as well as Joseph Stafford and Jose Guillermo Estifano.

After his father died in 1808, William administered the estate and purchased 6 steers and a black boy from it. Thomas W. Griffith filed a mortgage foreclosure on a piece of property in Baltimore City in Chancery County against William J. & Mary Stafford in 1817. In 1820, he was named as a defendant with his brothers and sister in a lawsuit filed by their brother Joseph S. Stafford in the Frederick County, Virginia, Chancery Court. Court proceedings continued through at least 1834, with no resolution given in court papers.

William J. Stafford was recorded in the 1820 Census for Baltimore, Maryland.

== War of 1812 ==
Stafford was the first of four generations of Stafford men to become a seaman, attained the rank of captain as commander of the privateer Dolphin, a 12-gun schooner who served in the War of 1812. Stafford and Dolphin carried Baltimore's privateering commission No. 2, and Stafford was responsible for the first prize captured on 26 July 1812, a British schooner valued at $18,000. Dolphin operated in the sea lanes from Baltimore to Buenos Aires and across the Atlantic to the coast of Portugal. She captured 11 British ships, nine of which were brought home to Baltimore.

On 25 January 1813, Dolphin captured the British merchantmen Three Brothers and Hebe. W. A. Brigham, the captain of Hebe, was taken prisoner and treated by Dolphin's surgeon. He later attributed his recovery to the surgeon's skill and Stafford's good treatment in a statement published in Baltimore. They were all given back their clothing and personal possessions, and all the wounded were diligently attended to. Brigham made the statement: "Should the fortune of war ever throw Captain Stafford or any of his crew into the hands of the British it is sincerely hoped he will meet a similar treatment". Stafford was well known for his kindness of manner toward prisoners.

On 1 April 1813, Stafford was engaged by a British squadron commanded by Lieutenant James Polkinghorne blockading the Rappahannock River, in what is known as Battle of Rappahannock River. After a stubborn fight of fifteen minutes, Stafford surrendered Dolphin and was taken captive, but on April 7 and his surgeon were paroled and sent ashore. The British took Dolphin into service as HMS Dolphin. By November 1813, Stafford commanded another privateer that was attacked by the British in Charleston Harbor.

== South American Venture ==
Following the end of hostilities with the British in 1814, Stafford and other privateers sailed for Cartagena where they were arrested by Spanish forces who confiscated their ships and cargoes. The Spaniards stripped and beat the men with rifle butts before throwing them into prison. This led to the privateers siding with the Venezuelan rebels following their release and plundering Spanish interests. Charges were leveled specifically against Stafford in 1817 and 1818, including piracy of Spanish ships and smuggling of Spanish goods into the United States by various means. Commanding the new brigantine Patriota, built and outfitted in Baltimore, Captain Stafford sailed from Baltimore in early 1817. Privateering in the Spanish waters of the Gulf of Mexico and the Caribbean, he adopted a Spanish name—Jose Guillermo Estifano, a rough equivalent of his English name. Records show that he used several aliases and had several ships at his disposal. His brother James Bruce Stafford sailed with him in the period 1818–1819, and commanded one of their prizes on the voyage to Baltimore and Savannah.

George Coggeshall, author of History of American Privateers and Letters-of-Marque wrote of his personal acquaintance with Captain Stafford and said that he was "a modest, unassuming, gentlemanly man; no one can, for a moment, doubt his unflinching bravery and gallant bearing, when he reflects on the many battles he has gained over the enemies of his country." T.S. Currier, author of The Cruise of the General San Martin, said of Captain Stafford that he was a man who had all the features of the seasoned and unscrupulous privateer, though able to impose his personality upon a crew that was diverse in language and nationality, obsessed with booty, rebellious and often mutinous. Feliciano Gamez Duarte wrote in his doctoral thesis at the University of Cadiz that Stafford must have been a man of great courage with a strong personality and the ability to control his riotous crew by the power of his own will. Such was his confidence that Stafford often had his wife traveling with him.
