= HMS Cockchafer (1812) =

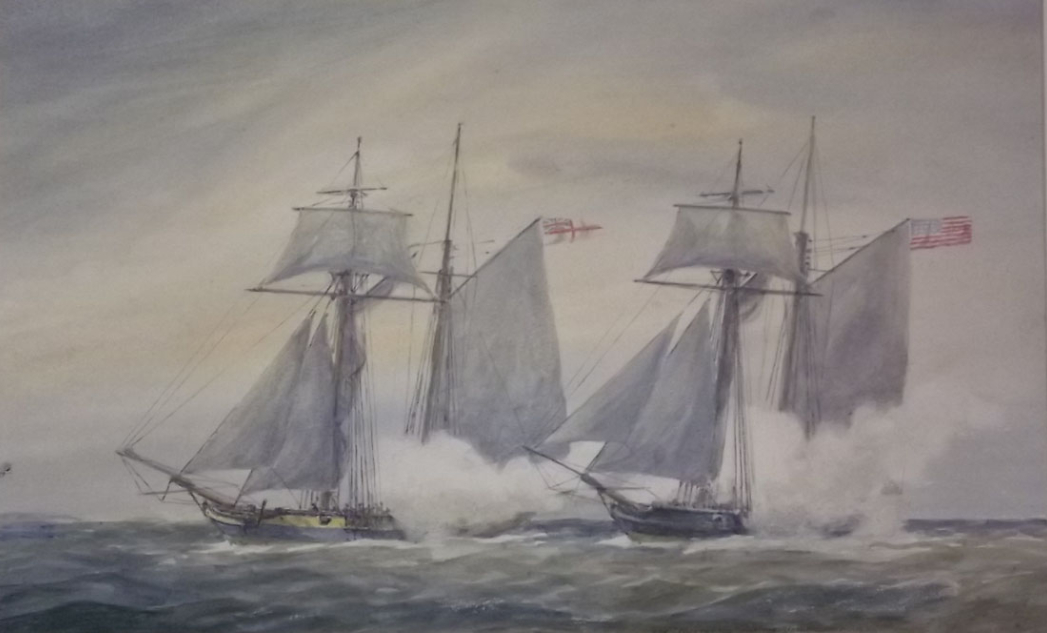
- Cockchafer capturing the American privateer Java, May 1814

History

United Kingdom
- Name: HM hired armed lugger Cockchafer
- Namesake: Cockchafer
- Acquired: 1812 by purchase of a prize
- Fate: Sold 1815

General characteristics
- Tons burthen: 10466/94 (bm)
- Length: Overall:69 ft 4 in (21.1 m); Keel:55 ft 6 in (16.9 m)
- Beam: 18 ft 10 in (5.7 m)
- Depth of hold: 8 ft 0 in (2.4 m)
- Complement: 22 (RN)
- Armament: Privateer: 2 guns; RN tender:1 × 12-pounder gun + 4 × 12-pounder carronades

HMS Cockchafer was a United States schooner, formerly named Spencer, that the Royal Navy (RN) captured and employed as a ship's tender. She captured two American armed brigs, one in a single-ship action. The Navy sold her in 1815.

== Origins and capture ==
Cockchafer's origins are a little uncertain.

One source describes her as the United States' letter of marque Spence, launched in 1811 that HMS Maidstone captured on 3 August 1812. A listing of American vessels captured by the Royal Navy described Spence as a schooner of two guns that the boats of Maidstone and Spartan captured in the Little River, Bay of Fundy, together with three other armed vessels. The main part of the vessels' crews escaped. A source on United States privateers gives her master's name as Tucker and describes her as a boat.

The Cockchafer was the former schooner Spencer, of eight guns. The Royal Navy had a practice of not having two vessels with the same name in commission at the same time. The schooner could not retain the name Spencer in Royal Navy service because of the 74-gun HMS Spencer, which was in service from 1800 to 1822.

There was a United States' letter of marque named Spencer, a schooner of 169 tons (bm), but she was recommissioned in October 1813, and there is no record of her having ever been captured.

Lastly, Maidstone was one of the vessels that shared in the capture on 1 February 1813 of a schooner named Spencer. Unfortunately, her capture was not adjudicated in the Vice admiralty court at Halifax so currently nothing is known about her except her name and those of her captors.

== Royal Navy ==
Lieutenant George Urmston commissioned Cockchafer in early 1813.

On 11 July 1813, a squadron under the command of Rear-Admiral George Cockburn in Sceptre, and comprising Romulus, Fox, Nemesis, and Conflict, and the tenders Cockchafer and Highflyer, anchored off Ocracoke Island, on the North Carolina coast. The next day they landed troops under Lieutenant Colonel Napier of the 102nd Regiment of Foot. The two tenders and number of smaller vessels were in the third division.

The squadron faced resistance from a brig and a schooner, the only American armed vessels. The first division, under Lieutenant Westphall, came in under covering fire from Congreve rockets and captured the two American vessels. These two were Atlas and Anaconda, both letters of marque. Anaconda was a brig-sloop of 18 long 9-pounder guns and a crew of 160, with a home port of New York City. Atlas, of 10 guns and 240 tons, had a home port of Philadelphia. Both subsequently entered the Royal Navy. Anaconda retained her own name; Atlas became the 14-gun schooner St Lawrence. While the navy was capturing the American vessels, the troops captured Portsmouth and Ocracoke islands.

Cockchafer was among the vessels that captured vegetables and provisions on the Chesapeake on 23 October 1813, 15 November, and 27 December, for which prize money was paid. (Note: First-class shares for the three captures were worth, in order, £3 18s 11 1/4d, £1 5 1/2d, and £5 19s. Sixth-class shares, those of ordinary seamen, were worth 7 1/2d, 2d, and 1s 1d.)

Cockchafer, Lieutenant Charles Blood, was among the vessels that shared in the prize money for the brig Regulator, Wright, master, captured on 22 November 1813. (Note: A first-class share was worth £44 7s 2 1/2d; sixth-class share was worth 7s 9 3/4d.)

Cockchafer, Lieutenant Charles Blood, was among the vessels that shared in the prize money for the brigs George, Crocker, master, and Betsey, Percival, master, captured on 23 December 1813.

In March 1814 Mr. George Jackson assumed command of Cockchafer. (Note: Winfield suggests that Thomas Brownrig (or Brownrigg) commanded Cockchafer in September 1814. This may have been short term command. Brownrig had been appointed assistant surgeon on HMS Tonnant on 21 March 1814, before he served on Cockchafer. A short biography reported that he was on her at the capture of two American letters-of-marque and a severe engagement with a slaver of 22 (or 16) guns.)

Cockchafer was sent to Nassau, New Providence, to protect the coasting-trade, and to escort convoys to Havana and the Gulf of Mexico.

On 28 July Cockchafer sailed to Pensacola in company with HMS Sophie. They were carrying George Woodbine (an honorary captain in the Corps of Colonial Marines) and supplies to Britain's Creek, Chocktaw, and other allies there.

Cockchafer then carried despatches for the Commander-in-Chief in the Chesapeake, and on her arrival there she was ordered up the Potomac to assist the British in their descent of that river, after the capture of Alexandria.

Jackson subsequently led the starboard division in the Battle of Baltimore (September 12–15, 1814), on which occasion he took soundings. Cockchafer was part of the Royal Navy's bombardment squadron. When American cannon fire shredded her sails Admiral Cochrane had her withdraw.

Cockchafer returned New Providence, convoying a brig carrying government stores and presents for the Indian chiefs.

On 3 December 1814 Cockchafer captured the United States' letter of marque Aurora, of Wisscasset, Maine. Aurora was a schooner of four guns and 20 men, or ten 9-pounder guns and 28 men.

Cockchafer captured the brig Java, of 160 tons (bm), on 20 December 1814. US sources stated that Cockchafer, 22 men, Lieutenant George Jackson, was cruising off the Chesapeake when in May 1814 she captured the American letter-of-marque Java, of eight 9-pounder guns and 22 men, after a long engagement.

In all Cockchafer captured six American vessels, including Aurora and Java.

== Fate ==
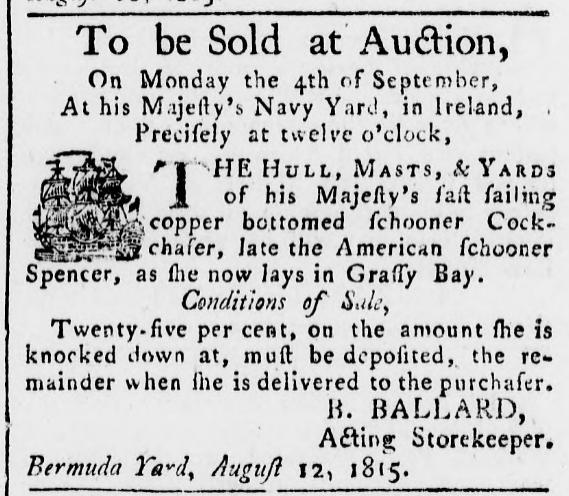
12 August 1815 advertisement by His Majesty's Dockyard Bermuda of auction of HMS Cockchafer published 19 August 1815 in The Bermuda Gazette.

The Royal Navy sold Cockchafer in late 1815 at the Royal Naval Dockyard on Ireland Island in the Imperial fortress colony of Bermuda.
