= Peter Waldo (1811 ship) =

History

United Kingdom
- Name: Peter Waldo
- Namesake: Peter Waldo
- Builder: Captain Anthony Landers, Plymouth
- Launched: 1811
- Captured: 9 August 1812

General characteristics
- Tons burthen: 259 (bm)

Peter Waldo was launched in 1811 at Plymouth. She made one voyage between Newcastle upon Tyne and North America and was captured on the outward leg of her second voyage.

On 9 August 1812 Peter Waldo was within 24 hours sail of Halifax, Nova Scotia when the American privateer Teazer captured her.

Teazer left Portland, Maine on 3 August and nine days later encountered Peter Waldo. Teazer captured Peter Waldo, Ralph Wilkes Herbert, master, her first prize on the cruise, without firing a shot. The prize master, Charles Warren, and six men took Peter Waldo into Portland. She reportedly netted her captors more than US$100,000. Her cargo consisted of clothing and blankets for British troops in Canada, crockery, and a bull and a cow. (Note: The original source for the valuation of US$100000 came from Niles' National Register (1813: vol. 3, p. 12).) The bull and cow belonged to a Methodist minister who was bringing them with him. After the war he found them near Portland and bought them back.
