= Teazer (privateer) =

History

United States
- Owner: Samuel Adams
- Fate: Burned January 1813

General characteristics
- Sail plan: Schooner

Teazer was an American privateer schooner in the War of 1812 that the British captured and destroyed in January 1813. She is best known as the predecessor of the ill-fated schooner Young Teazer.

A small schooner based out of New York, Teazer was one of the first American privateers to put to sea in the war. On her first voyage she quickly captured six brigs and six schooners that she sent in to US ports as prizes. However, her career was short-lived. On 17 January 1813, HMS San Domingo captured her. British sailors then boarded Teazer and set her afire.

The British allowed Teazer's officers to go home on parole: that is, they were freed upon their promising that they would not sail against Great Britain until an equivalent British prisoner had been exchanged. One of the privateer officers was Lieutenant Frederick Johnson. Teazer's owner, Samuel Adams of New York, quickly built a larger replacement schooner named Young Teazer, and Johnson joined Young Teazer, breaking his parole.

When the British cornered Young Teazer at Mahone Bay on 27 June 1813, Johnson was serving as her first lieutenant. Known for his violent temper, and vowing to avoid capture, he set off an explosion that killed almost the entire crew of Young Teazer.

== Prizes ==
Date	Vessel	Outcome
1812, 12 August	Peter Waldo (1811 ship)	Sold Portland, Maine
	Venus	
	Osborne	
