= Richard Stafford (pioneer) =

Land speculator and pioneer of Hampshire County, West Virginia

Richard Stafford (c.1755 – 1808) was a land speculator and pioneer of Hampshire County, West Virginia. He was one of the founding trustees of Fort Ashby, West Virginia, in 1787.

== Biography ==
Richard Stafford was born about 1755 in Wexford County, Ireland. The Staffords of Wexford County are said to be descendants of a John Stafford, third son of the noble Buckinghamshire family who emigrated to Wexford County before 1335. The family acquired Ballymachrane during the reign of King Henry VII. A John Stafford was High Sheriff in 1640.

In 1775, Richard Stafford was arrested in London and convicted on charges of robbery. Given the choice between hanging and 14 years of military service, he chose the military. It is thought that he arrived with the British Fleet in New York Harbor in the summer of 1776. Under the command of General William Howe and Admiral Lord Richard Howe, 1200 cannon, 30,000 soldiers, and 10,000 sailors landed to put down the American Revolution. Stafford was soon taken prisoner by Continental forces, but later released in the wilderness of Northern Virginia under the condition he would fight no more against the colonies.

On March 15, 1780, Richard Stafford married Catharine Brobeker.

In April 1783, Richard Stafford purchased land from Lewis & Mary Stephens of Frederick County, Virginia, a lot of 2 acres near the town of Stephensburg, Virginia by the side of the road leading from Winchester to Stephensburg. He paid £10, and owned the lot until about 1793, when he sold the land to John McCowens. In December 1783, he is first referenced in land transactions along the North Branch of the Potomac River in Hampshire County, West Virginia, and he had taken up residence there by 1785. In 1786, he purchased a lot in the new town of Frankfort. On December 5, 1787, he was named as one of eight founding trustees for the town of Frankfort (Fort Ashby) in An Act to Establish a Town in the County of Hampshire. The General Assembly of Virginia set aside 139 acres for that purpose. In 1788, Stafford purchased 400 acres near the crossroads on the South Branch of the Potomac River, land that had formerly belonged to Thomas Fairfax, 6th Lord Fairfax of Cameron. He owned additional properties in Frankfort and on the west side of Knobly Mountain adjacent to Anderson Bottoms.

Richard Stafford died April 7, 1808, in Hampshire County, West Virginia. His widow Catharine died there September 5, 1810.

== Children ==
- William Josephus Stafford (1781–1823), sea captain and privateer of Baltimore, Maryland
- Francis Asbury Stafford Sr. (1782–1868), farmer and pioneer settler of Coshocton County, Ohio
- Richard Adams Stafford (1784–1823), wagon maker and pioneer settler of Coshocton & Muskingum Counties, Ohio
- John Fletcher Stafford (1786- ? )
- James Bruce Stafford (1788- ? )
- Joseph Stone Stafford (1790-1850s), farmer and lifelong resident of Hampshire County, West Virginia
- Westley Stafford (1792–1856), farmer and pioneer settler of Fayette & Kosciusko Counties, Indiana
- Mary Stafford (1797-1797)
- Washington Stafford (1799–1810)
- Sarah Stafford (1800- ? )
