= New Castle and Frenchtown Railroad Right-of-Way =

- U.S. National Register of Historic Places
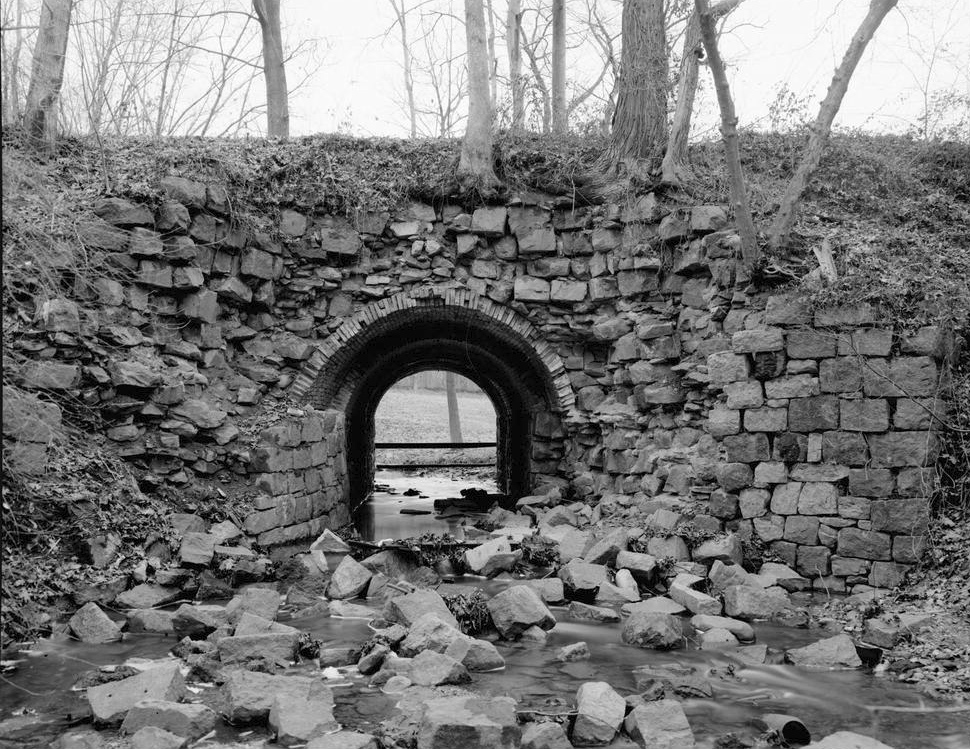
- Culvert across Perch Creek

- Location within Maryland Location within the United States
- Nearest city: Frenchtown, Maryland and Porter, Delaware
- Coordinates: 39°35′37″N 75°45′54″W
- Area: 0 acres (0 ha)
- Built: 1831
- Architect: John Randel, Jr.
- NRHP reference No.: 76002290
- Added to NRHP: September 1, 1976

New Castle and Frenchtown Railroad Right-of-Way is a railroad right of way connecting Frenchtown, Cecil County, Maryland, and Porter, New Castle County, Delaware. The New Castle and Frenchtown Railroad originally crossed the Delmarva Peninsula from a wharf in New Castle to a wharf at Frenchtown on the Elk River in Maryland. This part of the right-of-way is abandoned for railroad purposes, although parts of it serve as county roads.

On the Cecil County side of this segment of the line, the track bed had been abandoned by 1858. The County Commissioners turned it into "a common neighborhood road," the Cecil Whig reported.

It was listed on the National Register of Historic Places in 1976.

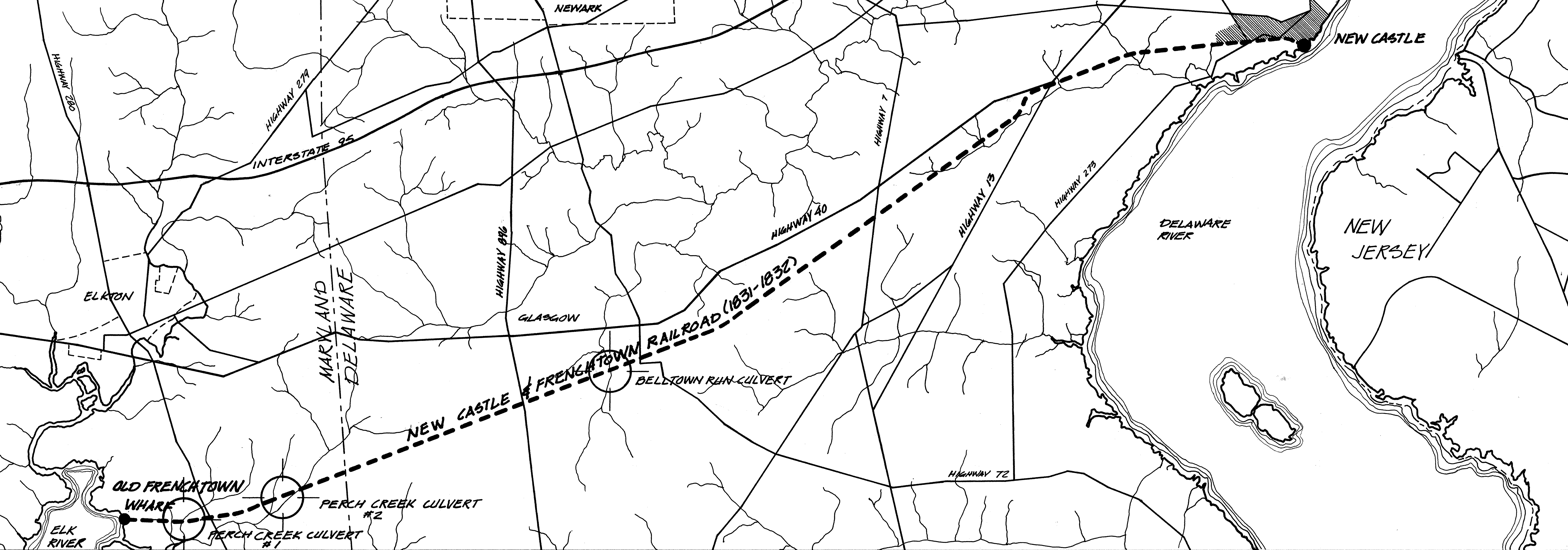
Railroad route map
