= Monmouth (1809 ship) =

Ship

History

United Kingdom
- Name: Monmouth
- Namesake: Monmouth
- Owner: Christopher Nockles
- Builder: Laing & Co, South Shields
- Launched: 1809
- Fate: Wrecked 23 December 1826

General characteristics
- Tons burthen: 289, or 290 or 292 (bm)
- Sail plan: Barque
- Armament: 7 × 9-pounder carronades

Monmouth was a ship launched at Shields in 1803 as a West Indiaman. Between 1818 and 1821 she made two voyages as a whaler. Afterwards, she started sailing to India. She was wrecked in December 1826 on her way to Calcutta.

== Career ==
Monmouth first appeared in Lloyd's Register in 1811 with Sursler, master, Nockles, owner, and trade London–Jamaica.

In 1814 Monmouth's master was R. Quelch. She sailed to Halifax, Nova Scotia, and later was reported to be late in arriving at Bermuda after having been in a gale. On 3 March 1814 she had left Halifax for Bermuda in a small convoy under escort by HMS Epervier and Shelburne.

The Register of Shipping for 1818 showed Monmouth with Stewart, master, and trade London–South Seas.

Whaling voyage #1 (1818–1819): Captain Stewart sailed from England on 4 May 1818. He returned on 22 June 1819 with 500 casks of whale oil.

Whaling voyage #2 (1819–1821): Captain Stewart sailed from England on 20 July 1819. He returned on 27 July 1821 with 550 casks of whale oil, plus fins (baleen).

After her return, Monmouth's trade generally became London–Cape of Good Hope.

Lloyd's Register list of ships trading with India for 1826 shows Monmouth, J. Edghill, master, Nockells, owner, and destination Bengal. she reportedly left England on 21 June 1821.

== Fate ==
Monmouth was wrecked on 23 December 1826 near "St. Martino Island" (St. Martin's Island). The crew arrived at Chittagong after eight days in their own boats. She was on a voyage from North Shields, County Durham, to Calcutta.
