= HMS Dolphin (1813) =

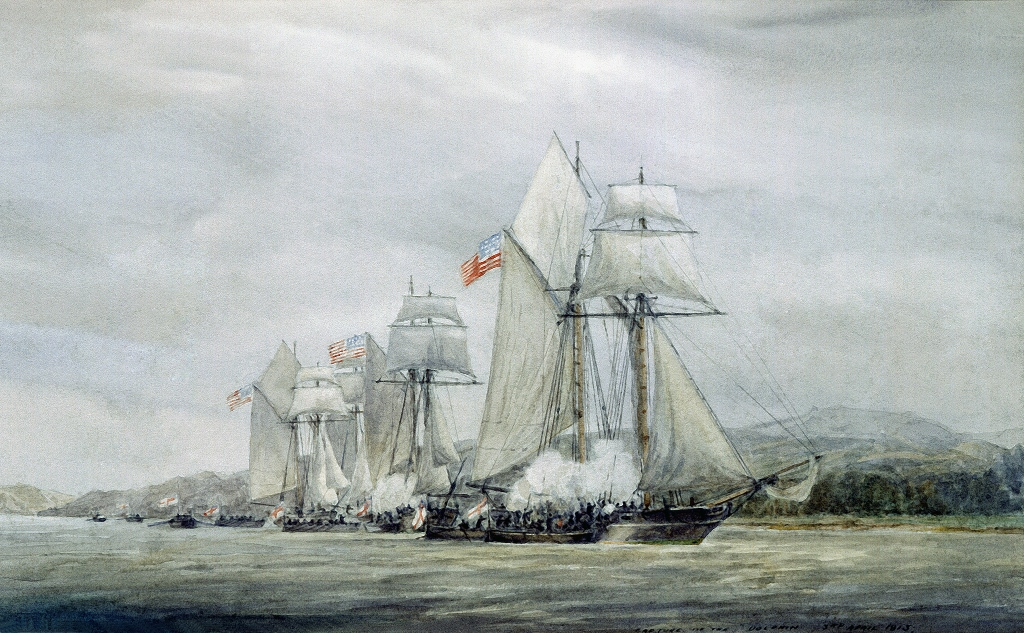
- Dolphin (centre) during the Battle of Rappahannock River

History

United States
- Name: Dolphin
- Owner: John Hollins, John Smith Hollins, Michael McBlair, Lemuel Taylor, Samuel Smith & James A. Buchanan
- Homeport: Baltimore, Maryland
- Fate: Captured April 1813

United Kingdom
- Name: HMS Dolphin
- Acquired: By capture, 3 April 1813
- Commissioned: 11 July 1813
- Honours and awards: Naval General Service Medal with clasp "April & May Boat Service 1813"
- Fate: Unknown

General characteristics
- Type: Schooner
- Tons burthen: 161 (bm)
- Complement: 100
- Armament: 2 × 9-pounder guns + 10 × 12-pounder carronades

HMS Dolphin was the 12-gun American privateer schooner Dolphin that Admiral John Borlase Warren's squadron captured on 13 April 1813 and that the Royal Navy took into service. As HMS Dolphin she participated in boat actions on 29 April and 5 May 1813 for which the Admiralty issued a clasp for the Naval General Service Medal. Her ultimate fate is currently undocumented.

== Privateer ==
Dolphin had been an American privateer and had carried Baltimore's privateering commission No. 2. Under Captain W.S. Stafford, on 26 July 1812 she captured a British vessel valued at US$18,000, and in August she captured the schooner Fanny, valued at a similar amount. In the same month she captured the schooner James, which she sent into port, and destroyed several doggers. Next she captured and sent into Baltimore the John Hamilton, of 10 guns and 30 men, laden with several hundred tons of mahogany.

She had had an unsuccessful cruise of two months before on 25 January 1813 she captured Hebe, of 16 guns and 40 men, and the brig Three Brothers, of ten guns and 25 men. Captain W.A. Brigham of Hebe was wounded by a musket ball and later injured by a powder explosion. Dolphin had four men wounded and the British eight to 10 (accounts differ), including Brigham. (Note: The discussion in Maclay suggests that Dolphin captured both vessels in a joint action. Other reports suggest that Dolphin first captured Hebe and later captured Three Brothers.) HMS Shannon recaptured Hebe six days later, before she could reach America. Dolphin returned to Baltimore on 13 February.

In all, as a privateer, Dolphin had captured 11 British vessels. One had been burned at sea and another (Hebe) recaptured. However, nine had been brought safely back to the United States.

=== Battle of Rappahannock River ===
A British cutting out party of 17 boats under the command of Lieutenant James Polkinghorne was able to work its way 15 miles up the Rappahannock River. There they found four American vessels laying becalmed and out of range of each other. The British captured all four on 3 April 1813:

- Arab, Captain D. Fitch, seven guns and 45 men
- Racer, Captain D. Chaytnor, six guns and 36 men
- Lynx, Captain E. Taylor, six guns and 40 men
- Dolphin, Captain W. S. Stafford, 12 guns and 100 men

The British first captured Arab, which put up a strong fight and caused them the heaviest losses of the day. The British then captured the next two with no resistance from Lynx and little from Racer. Dolphin resisted for two hours before surrendering. Polkinhorne reported that he had lost two men killed and eleven wounded, including himself, and he received a promotion to commander for his part in the action. American newspapers at first claimed that the British had lost 50 men, later reporting that British losses were two boats sunk with nineteen killed and forty wounded. Stafford placed his losses at six killed and ten wounded. The others lost five more wounded. Subsequently the British took Racer, Lynx, and Dolphin into service. It was difficult for the British to free Arab and though they eventually succeeded, the vessel was apparently badly damaged and was not commissioned for British service. She was taken to Halifax where the Vice-Admiralty Court condemned her.

== British service ==
Dolphin retained her name and became a tender commanded by Lieutenant George Hutchinson. On 29 April 1813, boats from Dolphin, together with boats from Fantome, Mohawk and Highflyer and Racer, which had not yet been renamed, went up the Chesapeake Bay to Frenchtown to destroy five American ships and stores; they also purchased provisions for the squadron from the locals. This took until 3 May 1813 to complete. On the way back, a battery fired on the British from the shore; a landing party destroyed the battery. The Admiralty would later issue the clasp "April & May Boat Service 1813" for the Naval General Service Medal for the action.

The rest of Dolphin's service career and what became of her at the end of the war is unknown.
