= HMS Fantome (1810) =

- Fantome

History

France
- Name: Fantôme
- Owner: Robert Surcouf
- Port of registry: St. Malo
- Launched: 1809
- Fate: Captured by Royal Navy ships Melampus and Driver 28 May 1810

United Kingdom
- Name: HMS Fantome
- Acquired: by capture, 28 May 1810
- Commissioned: 4 August 1810
- Honours and awards: Naval General Service Medal with clasp "April & May Boat Service 1813"
- Fate: Wrecked, 24 November 1814

General characteristics
- Type: Brig
- Tons burthen: 3806/94 tons (bm)
- Length: 94 ft 1 in (28.7 m) (Overall); 75 ft 6 1/2 in (23.0 m) (keel)
- Beam: 30 ft 11 in (9.4 m)
- Depth of hold: 13 ft 0 in (4.0 m)
- Complement: 74
- Armament: French service: 20 heavy carronades; British service: 16 × 32-pounder carronades + 2 × 6-pounder bow chasers

HMS Fantome was an 18-gun brig-sloop of the Royal Navy. She was originally a French privateer brig named Fantôme, which the British captured in 1810 and commissioned into British service. Fantome saw extensive action in the War of 1812 until she was lost in a shipwreck at Prospect, Nova Scotia, near Halifax in 1814.

== Construction and French Service ==
Fantôme was built at St. Malo, France by the noted French privateer captain Robert Surcouf in 1809 as a privately owned corvette brig. On her first voyage the brig sailed to Isle de France (Mauritius) in the Indian Ocean as an armed transport with a license to attack enemy ships. Fantôme was pierced for 20 heavy carronades and carried a crew of 74 men. She made three captures. One was William, Hughes, master, which had been sailing from Belfast to the Brazils. Fantôme took off dollars and goods, but then gave the brig up, which sailed on to Pernambuco.

== Capture ==
The frigate Melampus was in company with the sloop Driver when they captured Fantome in the mid Atlantic on the brig's return voyage from the Indian Ocean on 28 May 1810. The brig was taken to the Halifax Vice admiralty court and condemned in June 1810. The Royal Navy took her into service as HMS Fantome after a refit at the Halifax naval yard for conversion to British service. She was commissioned at Bermuda in 1811 under Commander John Lawrence.

== Initial British service ==
She initially served on the North Sea station. On 12 November 1811 she sailed for Portugal. Fantome detained the Canton, Allen, master, and sent her into Lisbon where she arrived on 19 July 1812.

On 4 December 1812 Fantome sailed for North America.

== War of 1812 ==
In February 1813, during the War of 1812, Fantome joined a squadron off the American coast under the command of Admiral Sir John Borlase Warren, consisting of the 74-gun ships San Domingo, Marlborough and Dragon, and the frigates Maidstone and Statira. Fantome was among the vessels in the squadron that captured the enemy vessels Gustavus and Staunch on 24 February. Similarly, she shared in the capture of Christiana (3 March) and Massasoit (14 March). However, prize money was not awarded until May 1818.

On 4 March 1813, Fantome captured and destroyed the American schooner Betsy Ann. She had been sailing from Alexandria to Boston with a cargo of flour. Fantome was among the vessels that shared in the proceeds of the capture of the General Knox on 17 March. (Note: A first-class share was worth £22 6s 8d; a sixth-class share, that of an ordinary seaman, was worth 3s 4d.)

=== Operations in the Chesapeake Bay ===
On 3 April 1813 five enemy armed vessels were sighted in the Chesapeake Bay. Boats of the squadron, under the command of Lieutenant Puckingthorne of San Domingo, rowed 15 miles upriver, where they found four armed schooners drawn up in line. Men from Statira's cutter and Maidstone's launch captured Dolphin. The attacking party lost two men killed and 11 wounded. Fantome had no casualties. A final distribution of headmoney for Lynx and Racer took place in February 1817. (Note: A first-class share was worth £14 2s 4¼d; a sixth-class share, that of an ordinary seaman, was worth 2s 3d, or about two days' wages.)

Later Captain Lawrence embarked a number of cows after giving the owner bills on the Victualling Officer. After observing the Americans firing from hoisting an American flag at a newly constructed battery at Havre de Grace, the Admiral determined to attack it. Captain Lawrence commanded the operation. At dawn on 2 May boats containing 150 marines, and a small party of artillerymen attacked, drove off the defenders and captured the battery.

On 29 April, boats from Dolphin, Dragon, Fantome, Highflyer, Maidstone, Marlborough, Mohawk, Racer and Statira went up the Elk River in the Chesapeake Bay under the personal command of Rear-Admiral Sir George Cockburn. Their objective was to destroy five American ships and stores, and by some accounts, a cannon foundry at French Town. This took until 3 May 1813 to complete. On the way, after a battery at Havre de Grace fired on them from the shore, a landing party destroyed the battery and burned much of the town. In 1847 the Admiralty authorized the issue of the Naval General Service Medal with clasp "April & May Boat Service 1813" to any surviving claimants from the action; the Navy issued 48 clasps.

On 30 April Highflyer supported Fantome and Mohawk's boats when the vessels gathered cattle for the fleet's use, paying with bills on the Victualling Office. The next day, the vessels secured more cattle from Spesutie (Spesucie) Island just south of Havre de Grace.

On 29 April Fantome recaptured the English brig Endeavour of 110 tons and six men which an American privateer had captured while Endeavour was carrying wine from Guernsey to Gibraltar. The recaptured Endeavour reached Bermuda at the end of June.

Fantome was among the vessels that shared in the capture on 18 May of Pilgrim, of 269 tons (bm), J.W.Baker. Pilgrim had been sailing from New Orleans to Cadiz.

Fantome shared in the proceeds of the capture of Rolla and cargo on 29 May.

=== Rescue of American slaves ===
While operating in the Chesapeake, Fantome rescued a number of families of enslaved African Americans who had escaped from plantations as part of the Black Refugee migration in the War of 1812. Fantome gave sanctuary to seven escaped slaves on 30 May 1813 who then joined Fantome's crew. Two of them used Fantome as a base from which to return to shore and rescue enslaved wives and children.

=== Further captures ===
Fantome was among the vessels sharing in the proceeds of the Spanish brig St. Iago and cargo captured on 11 June, (Note: A first-class share was worth £49 11s 1d; a sixth-class share was worth 9s 10d.) and the American schooner Surveyor captured the next day. The same ships shared in the compromise for the American ships Governor Strong and cargo (12 June), Emily and cargo (12 June), and Star and cargo (14 June). (Note: A first-class share was worth £282 12s 11d; a sixth-class share was worth £2 15s 11d.) The vessels that had shared the capture of Rolla also shared the capture of Protectress on 18 June. Lastly, she was among the vessels sharing in the proceeds of the American ship Herman and cargo (21 June). (Note: A first-class share was worth £47 13s 4d; a sixth-class share was worth 7s 6d.) On 26 June Fantome captured Cida de de Leira, J.J. Claudio, master. Cida, a brig of 230 tons (bm), had been sailing from Lisbon to Boston when she was captured. she was carrying wool, salt, wine, juniper berries, and 23 Merino sheep.

Fantome recaptured the brig Seaflower, G.Atkinson, master, on 9 July.

Fantome also recaptured an unnamed brig that had been sailing from Newfoundland to Barbados.

On 5 October Fantome and Epervier recaptured off Mount Desert Island, Maine, the former Nova Scotian privateer Liverpool Packet, then sailing as an American privateer under the name Portsmouth Packet, after a chase of 13 hours. At the time of her capture, Portsmouth Packet was armed with five guns, carried a crew of 45, and had sailed from Portsmouth, New Hampshire the previous day. She was a schooner of 55 tons (bm), under the command of Captain David Perkins. The recaptured schooner was brought into Halifax on 12 October. There her original owners repurchased her and restored the name of Liverpool Packet.

Almost a month later, on 3 November, Epervier and Fantome captured Peggy, of 91 tons (bm), W. O. Fuller, master. she had been sailing from George's River to Boston with a cargo of timber and wood.

Captain Lawrence was made a Companion of the Bath for his services. In November 1813 Fantome came under the command of Commander Thomas Sykes.

=== Canadian trek ===
On 21 January 1814 Lieutenant Henry Kent of Fantome volunteered to serve on the Great Lakes and joined 210 volunteer seamen from Fantome, Manly and Thistle. Seventy men left Halifax in Fantome on 22 January for Saint John, New Brunswick, then travelled with sleighs to Fredericton, a distance of 80 miles. From there they travelled along the ice of the Saint John River. After eighty-two miles, at Presque Isle, they exchanged sleighs for toboggans, and were supplied with snowshoes and moccasins. Leaving on 8 February they made between 15 and 22 miles a day through knee-deep snow along the St. Lawrence, reaching Quebec on the 28th, taking shelter in the frigate Aeolus and the sloop Indian, frozen up in Wolfe's Cove. They finally reached Kingston, Ontario, on 22 March. A few days later Lieutenant Kent joined the 42-gun frigate Princess Charlotte.

On 9 May 1814 Fantome captured the Spanish brig Danzic. The brig Dantzic, J.Reid, master, was sailing from Bath to Bermuda with a cargo of lumber, boards, staves, and shingles. She was sent into St Johns, New Brunswick.

== Loss ==
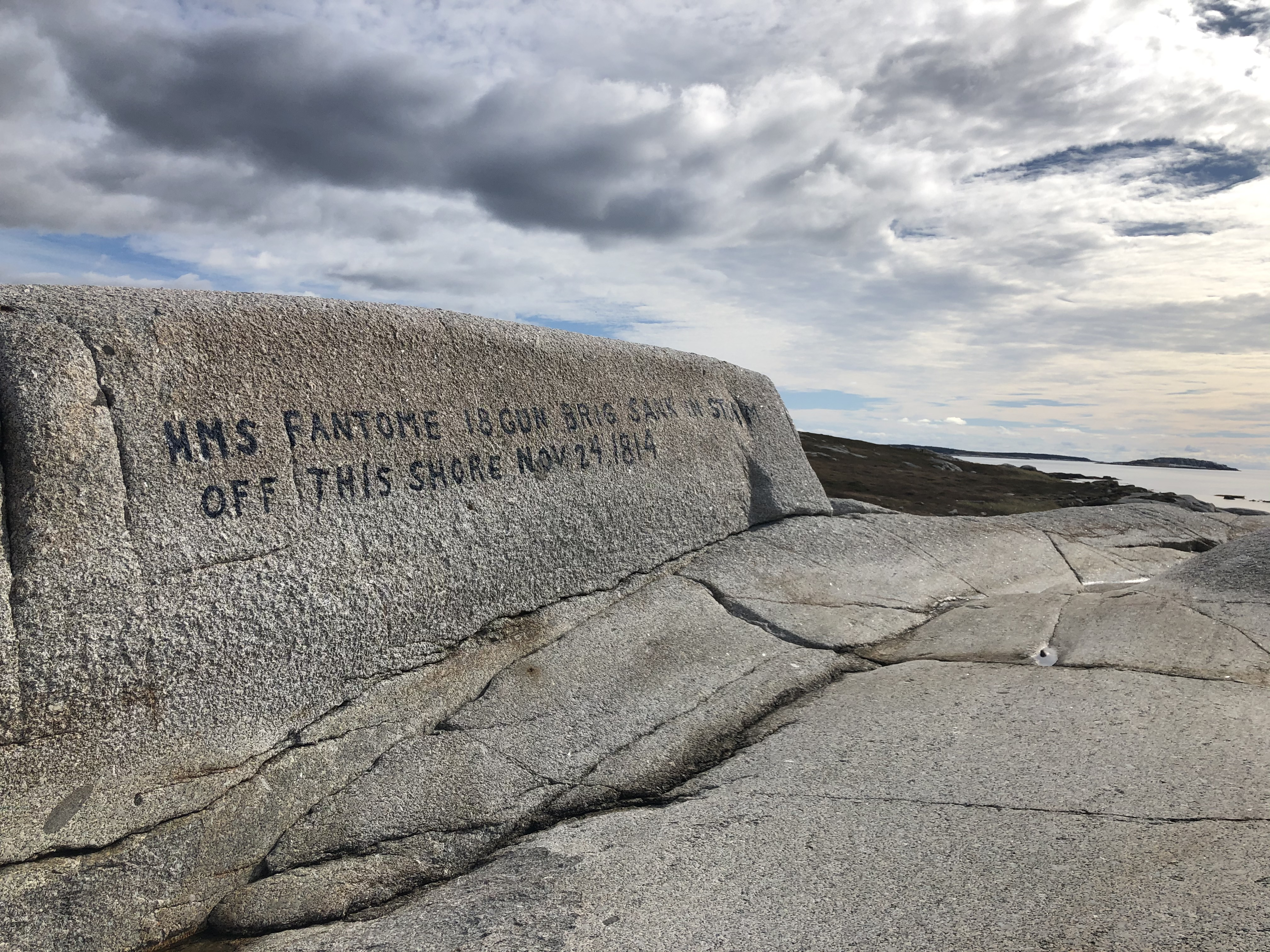
Prospect, Nova Scotia

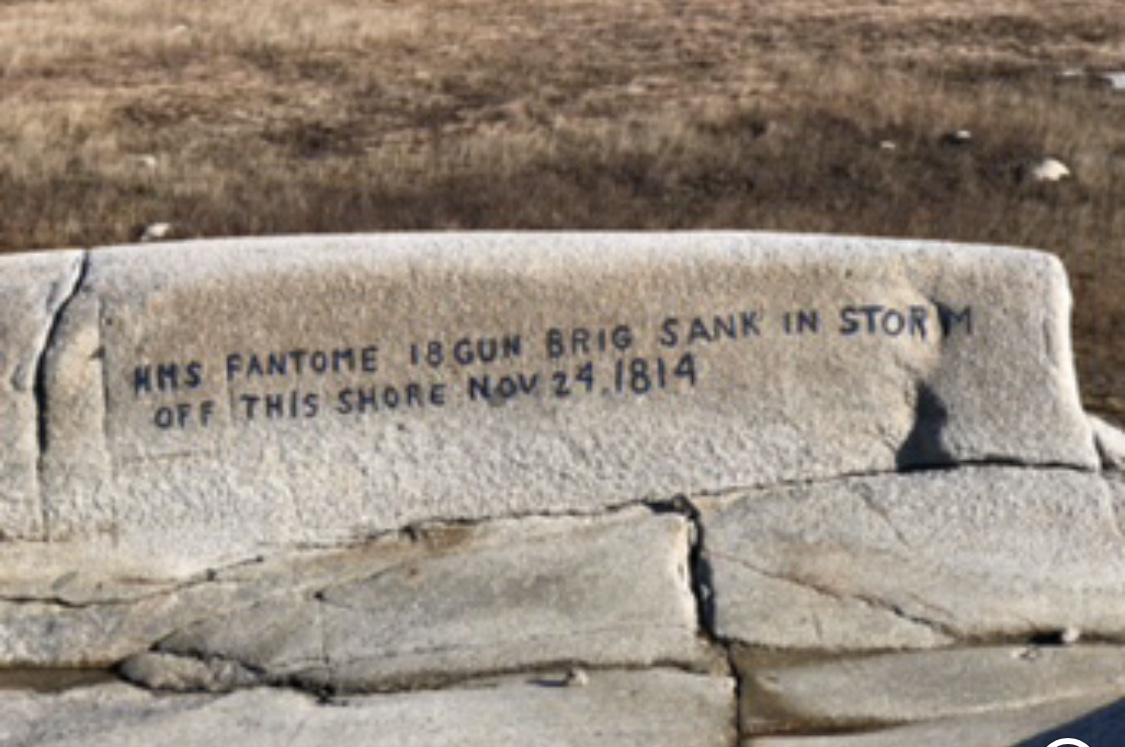
Prospect, Nova Scotia

Fantome ran aground in Shad Bay near the village of Prospect, Nova Scotia, on 24 November 1814. The brig was escorting a convoy from British-occupied Castine, Maine, to Halifax, Nova Scotia. On the evening of 23 November Sykes ordered that a course be set for the Sambro Light. At 2am the next morning he ordered a depth sounding and when it showed only 35 fathoms, ordered a change of course. An hour later, when he came back on deck he discovered that the pilot had countermanded his order. Soon after she struck. Sykes had the masts cut away and the boats hoisted over the sides, but Fantome rapidly filled with water. The crew took to the boats in an orderly manner and all reached the shore safely.

The subsequent court martial reprimanded Sykes for failing to order frequent soundings and for relying too much on the pilot. It ordered Lieutenant John Fisher, the officer of the watch, to be more careful in the future, especially in keeping the captain aware of his ship's situation. It severely reprimanded the master, Joseph Forster, for not taking continuous sounding and for not informing the captain about his reservations concerning the course being steered. Lastly, the court martial severely reprimanded the pilot, Thomas Robinson, for countermanding the captain's order, and for sailing too close to the shore and without taking soundings. It ordered the pilot to lose all pay due him.

Two schooners from the convoy, Industry and Perseverance, were lost at the same location. A transport brig from the convoy went aground elsewhere on the same night but was got off later. There were no deaths when the ships sank.

== Post-script ==
Some treasure hunters have claimed the convoy that Fantome was escorting was laden with goods taken from the White House during the British raid on Washington, DC. However Fantome played no part in the Washington raid and historians agree that the convoy was carrying goods and customs revenue from Castine. The site of Fantome's loss is marked today by an inscription on a large granite boulder near the wreck site at Prospect.
