= Spesutie Island =

Chesapeake Bay island in Harford County, Maryland

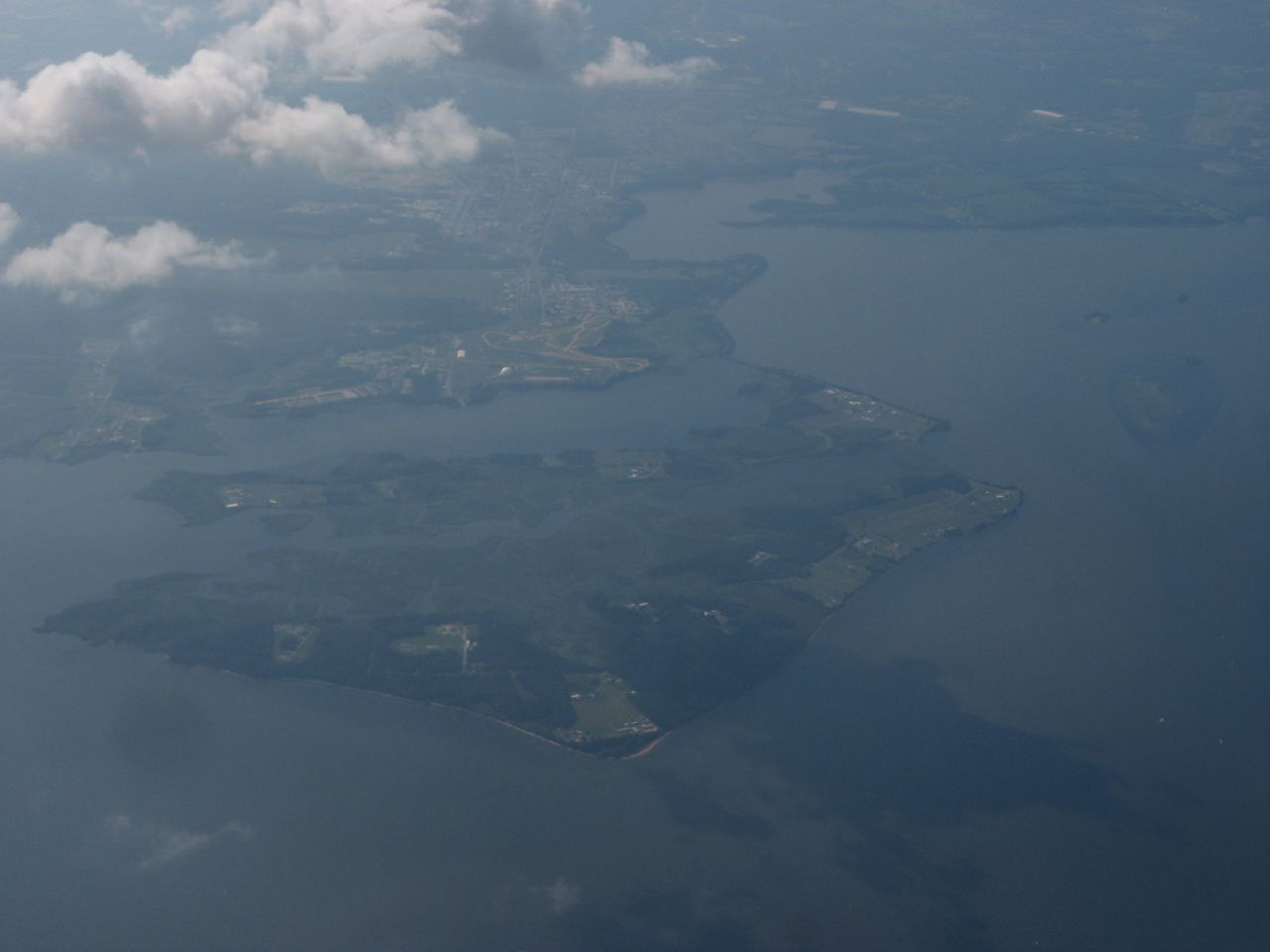
- Spesutie Island in 2008
- Interactive map of Spesutie Island

Geography
- Location: Harford County, Maryland
- Coordinates: 39°27′21″N 76°04′36″W
- Area: 1,500 acres (610 ha)
- Highest elevation: 3 ft (0.9 m)

Administration
- United States
- Part of: Aberdeen Proving Ground

Spesutie Island is a 1,500-acre (610 ha) island located in the Chesapeake Bay in Harford County, Maryland, United States. It lies 5.5 miles (8.9 km) southeast of Aberdeen, Maryland. Spesutie Narrows borders the island on the west and the bay borders it on the north, east, and south. The island is part of the Aberdeen Proving Ground.

== History ==
Evidence has been found of the historical presence of Native Americans on Spesutie Island. In 1658, Lord Baltimore granted the island to Nathaniel Utie who named his manor house using his surname and the Latin word for hope: spes. The property remained in the Utie family until 1779 when Samuel Hughes purchased it. In 1802, William Smith bought the island, and his descendants would remain there for almost a century, although the War of 1812 caused some disruption. In late April 1813, troops under the command of Rear Admiral George Cockburn briefly occupied the island, and passing vessels such as HMS Highflyer engaged in the forced purchase of cattle. The Smith family sold the island in 1900 and by 1927 ownership had passed to the Susquehanna Development Company. In 1936, J. P. Morgan Jr. built a house on the island to serve as a hunting lodge. The Spesutie Island Hunting and Fishing Club maintained the island until 1945 when the United States government purchased it and incorporated it into Aberdeen Proving Ground.

=== Other names ===
The United States Geological Survey records the following variant names for Spesutie Island: Bearsons Island, Spes Island, Spes Utia Island, Spes Utie Island, and Spesutia Island.

== Wildlife ==
Spesutie Island is home to a large population of bald eagles.

== See also ==
- List of islands in Maryland
