= USS Asp (1813) =

History

United States
- Name: Adeline
- Acquired: 1813, by purchase
- Renamed: USS Asp
- Fate: Sold 1824, or 1826

General characteristics
- Type: Schooner
- Tons burthen: 54, or 56 (bm)
- Complement: 20, or 21
- Armament: 1 × 12-pounder gun + 2 × 12-pounder carronades

The second USS Asp, was a three-gun schooner that the US Navy purchased on 17 February 1813 at Alexandria, D.C. (now Virginia). She cruised the Chesapeake Bay until in July the Royal Navy captured her. The British failed to scuttle her and her crew was able to recover her. The US Navy sold her in 1826.

== Career ==
In 1813, the US Navy purchased the schooner Adeline, for $2600. The Washington Navy Yard outfitted her as a warship.

American account: On 14 July, Asp, under the command of Midshipman James Butler Sigourney, and another small warship, USS Scorpion, got underway from the Yeocomico River, Virginia, and entered Chesapeake Bay. They soon encountered the British sloop HMS Contest and brig HMS Mohawk, which immediately gave chase. Scorpion escaped up the Chesapeake, but Asp's poor sailing qualities forced her to put back into the Yeocomico River. The two British ships anchored off the bar and prepared a cutting-out expedition. At the sight of oncoming British boats, Asp cut her cable and tried to escape farther up the river. At that point, the Americans repelled an attack by three of the British boats. Then two other British boats joined the first three for a second attempt, which proved successful. The Americans fought valiantly in spite of the lopsided odds. Midshipman Sigourney and nine of his 20-man crew were killed, wounded, or missing defending their ship; the remainder escaped ashore. Sigourney was one of those killed. The British set fire to Asp and retired. At that point, Midshipman H. McClintock, Asp's second in command, led the survivors of Asp's crew back on board, extinguished the flames, and took control of her. For whatever reason, the British declined to renew the combat.

British account: The schooner Asp was armed with one long 18-pounder gun and two 18-pounder carronades, plus swivel guns. She had a crew of 25 men under the command of a lieutenant. The Americans had hauled the schooner close to the beach, where she was under the protection of a large body of militia. Lieutenant Curry, of Contest, and Lieutenant Hutchinson, of Mohawk, advanced under heavy fire from schooner and shore and were able to capture the schooner in a few minutes. British casualties amounted to two men killed and six wounded, Lieutenant Curry among them.

Subsequent career and fate: After her recovery, Asp served on the southern coast until 1815. She finished out her Navy career at Baltimore, Maryland. She initially served as tender to the frigate USS Java, then under construction. Asp later became a receiving ship at Baltimore. The US Navy sold her in 1826. (Another source states that she was sold at Baltimore, but in 1824.
