= Frenchtown (ghost town), Maryland =

Frenchtown, Maryland
- Ghost town
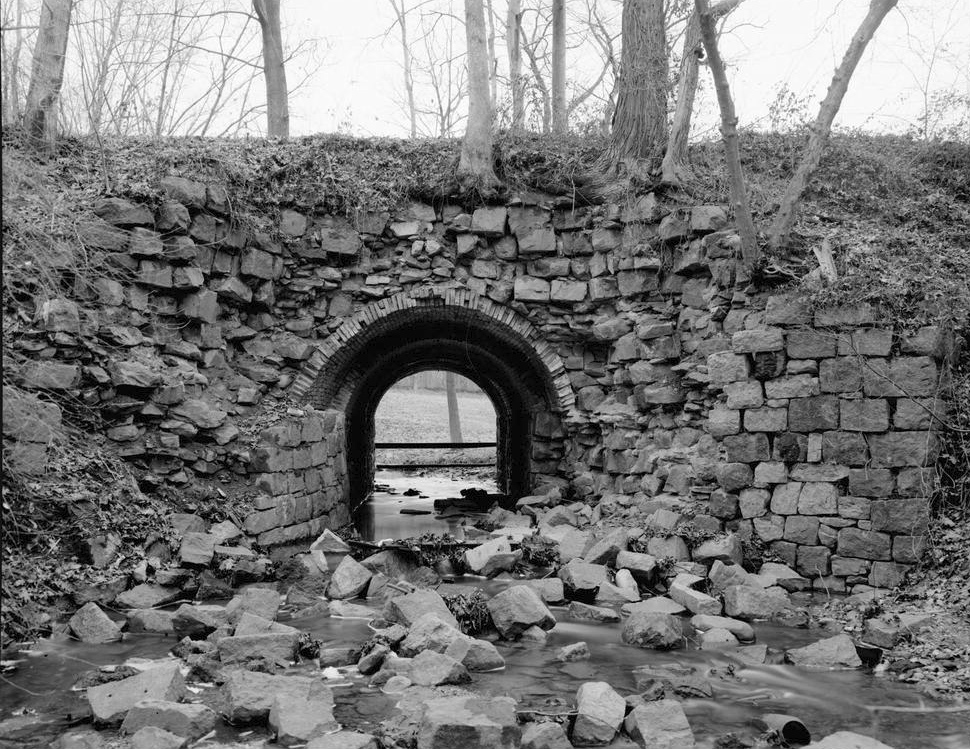
- A railroad culvert over Perch Creek near Frenchtown in Cecil County

- Location within the State of Maryland
- Coordinates: 39°34′47.68″N 75°50′22.52″W
- Country: United States
- State: Maryland
- County: Cecil
- Time zone: UTC-5 (Eastern (EST))
  - Summer (DST): UTC-4 (EDT)

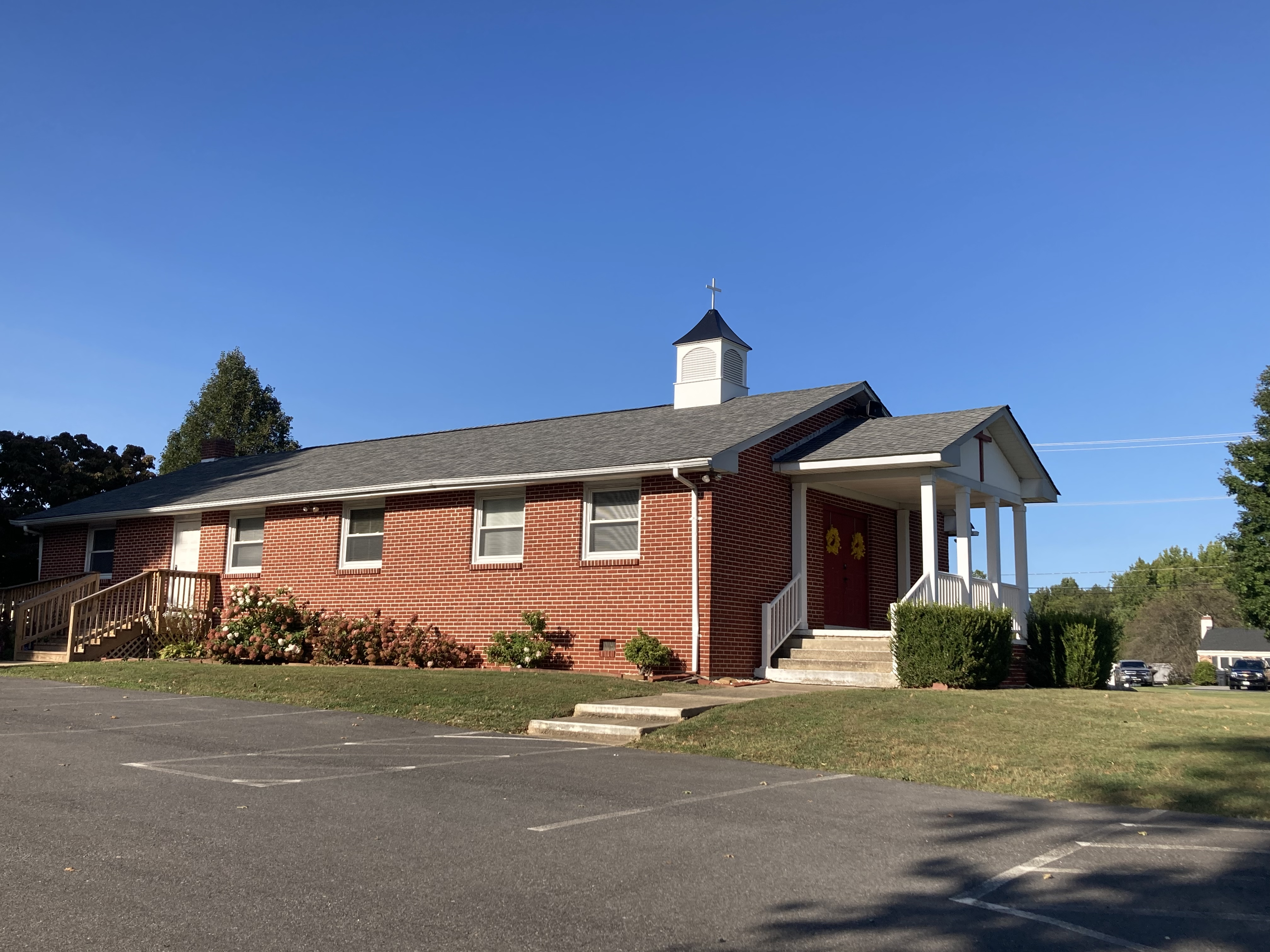
St. Peter's Anglican Church (ACNA) on Frenchtown Road near the historic settlement

Frenchtown was a historic settlement on the Elk River in Cecil County, Maryland, United States.

== Background ==
Frenchtown was an important link in the north–south travel route during the 17th, 18th, and 19th centuries. After the Revolutionary War, the popularity of the route for passengers and freight grew. A regular line of vessels began sailing from Baltimore to Frenchtown. As boats churned their way to the port, it established itself as a busy relay point on the main line of travel between Philadelphia and Baltimore. Statesmen and the traveling public came journeying through. At first the New Castle and Frenchtown Turnpike Company connected the village with the Delaware River, and later it was the New Castle and Frenchtown Railroad.

As a depot, it was burned by the British under Rear Admiral George Cockburn on April 29, 1813. The old Frenchtown Tavern remained standing until the 1960s. A watercolor by Benjamin Henry Latrobe dated August 2, 1806, is entitled View from the Packet Wharf at Frenchtown Looking Down Elk Creek showing the Mouth of Pates' Creek. The painting resides in the Metropolitan Museum of Art in New York.

After publication of the escape of slaves by the Chesapeake and Delaware Canal a close watch was kept on vessels using that passage. Frenchtown and the overland route was considered a safer route. A large escape attempt involving a Captain Sayres and his vessel named Pearl involved seventy-seven slaves boarding in Washington attempting to make Frenchtown. Pearl was pursued and the becalmed vessel overtaken at the mouth of the Potomac.

The northern portion of the Chesapeake Bay was notable for calms that delayed the sailing vessels connecting the town with Baltimore. In 1813 the first commercial steam vessel, Chesapeake built in Baltimore by Captain Edward Trippe, on the Chesapeake began service between Frenchtown and Baltimore as the Union Line. Within a year other steamers were making the run in competition.

The transportation revolution caused the village to fade as the Chesapeake and Delaware Canal opened up. Then, with the completion in 1837 of a rail line through Elkton, one that did not require steamboat connections on each waterway, business on the route started declining. "By 1858, stagecoaches, wagons, rail cars, and steamers no longer converged here, crowding down to the old shoreline."

The New Castle and Frenchtown Railroad Right-of-Way was listed on the National Register of Historic Places in 1976.
