= HMS Statira (1807) =

Lively-class frigate of the Royal Navy

History

United Kingdom
- Name: HMS Statira
- Ordered: 4 June 1805
- Builder: Robert Guillaume, Northam, Southampton
- Laid down: December 1805
- Launched: 7 July 1807
- Completed: 26 August 1807
- Commissioned: July 1807
- Decommissioned: February 1815
- Fate: Wrecked off Inagua on 26 February 1815

General characteristics
- Class & type: Lively-class frigate
- Tons burthen: 1,08481/94 tons bm
- Length: 154 ft 0 in (46.94 m) (gundeck); 129 ft 10.75 in (39.5923 m) (keel)
- Beam: 39 ft 7.5 in (12.078 m)
- Draught: 10 ft 7 in (3.23 m) (forward); 14 ft 8 in (4.47 m) (aft)
- Depth of hold: 13 ft 5.5 in (4.102 m)
- Sail plan: Full-rigged ship
- Complement: 284
- Armament: In 1807; FC: 2 × 9-pounder guns + 2 × 32-pounder carronades; QD: 2 × 9-pounder guns + 12 × 32-pounder carronades; UD: 28 × 18-pounder guns

HMS Statira was a Lively-class fifth-rate 38-gun sailing frigate of the British Royal Navy, built during the Napoleonic Wars.

== Construction ==
The sixteen ships of the Lively class were based on a design dating from 1799 by William Rule, the Surveyor of the Navy, and were probably the most successful British frigate design of the time.

== Service history ==
The Statira was commissioned under Captain Robert Howe Bromley. From December 1808, Captain Charles William Boys was her commanding officer. In company with Amelia, the 16 gun La Mouche was taken off Santander on 10 June 1809. She was present during the Walcheren Campaign later in the year. On 3 October 1809, Statira sailed for the Leeward Islands. Captain Boys died in November 1809, and was succeeded by Captain Volant Vashon Ballard, who was superseded in 1811 by Captain Hassard Stackpole.

In company with Colibri, Statira captured the American privateer Buckskin off Cape Sable on 11 August 1812. In January 1813, the Statira, in the company of Colibri and Dragon headed to Long Island Sound, subsequently commencing a coastal blockade of the Chesapeake. Her boats, with those from the Belvidera, Maidstone and Junon captured the American 6-gun privateer Lottery in Chesapeake Bay on 8 February 1813. The Statira, Belvidera and Morgiana controlled access to the Delaware during the Autumn 1813 blockade. From April 1814, she was commanded by Captain Spelman Swaine whilst at Jamaica.

On 1 November 1814, General Edward Pakenham, Major General Samuel Gibbs and Lieutenant Colonel Alexander Dickson embarked at Spithead and set sail for North America. Three days after setting sail, Swaine opened his sealed orders, and announced his destination was Jamaica. Pakenham's assistant adjutant general, Major Harry Smith, commented the Statira was 'a noble frigate... [with] a full complement of men.' It is asserted that the captain's seamanship and navigation were lacking and that the delay in arrival was ten days later than it should have been. On 13 December, the Statira arrived at Negril Point. On 24 December, the Statira joined Cochrane's fleet moored off Cat Island, and Pakenham disembarked to assume command. On 6 January 1815, a boat from the Statira overturned on Lake Borgne. Seventeen fusiliers with round shot in their knapsacks were drowned in the shallow waters.

The Statira was wrecked on a rock off Inagua (Heneagua) to the north of Cuba on 26 February 1815. The Statira Shoal, just southeast of Great Inagua, is named after where the ship wrecked.
