= HMS Marlborough (1807) =

Ship of the line of the Royal Navy

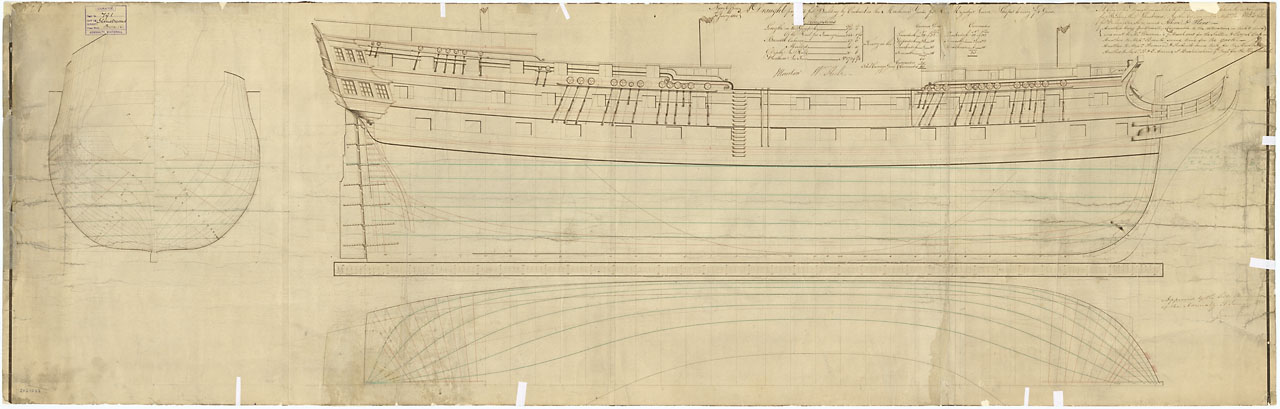
- Marlborough

History

United Kingdom
- Name: HMS Marlborough
- Ordered: 31 January 1805
- Builder: Barnard, Deptford
- Laid down: August 1805
- Launched: 22 June 1807
- Fate: Broken up, 1835

General characteristics
- Class & type: Fame-class ship of the line
- Tons burthen: 1754 bm
- Length: 175 ft (53 m) (gundeck)
- Beam: 47 ft 6 in (14.48 m)
- Depth of hold: 20 ft 6 in (6.25 m)
- Propulsion: Sails
- Sail plan: Full-rigged ship
- Armament: 74 guns: Gundeck: 28 × 32 pdrs; Upper gundeck: 28 × 18 pdrs; Quarterdeck: 4 × 12 pdrs, 10 × 32 pdr carronades; Forecastle: 4 × 12 pdrs, 2 × 32 pdr carronades; Poop deck: 6 × 18 pdr carronades

HMS Marlborough was a 74-gun third rate ship of the line of the Royal Navy, launched on 22 June 1807 at Deptford. In 1807, she helped escort the Portuguese royal family in its flight from Portugal to Brazil. In 1812 Marlborough became the flagship to Rear-Admiral Sir George Cockburn off Cadiz, from where she went to the North America Station and took part in the capture of Washington in August 1814.

Marlborough was laid up in Ordinary at Portsmouth from 1816 and broken up there in July 1835.
