= HMS Dover (1811) =

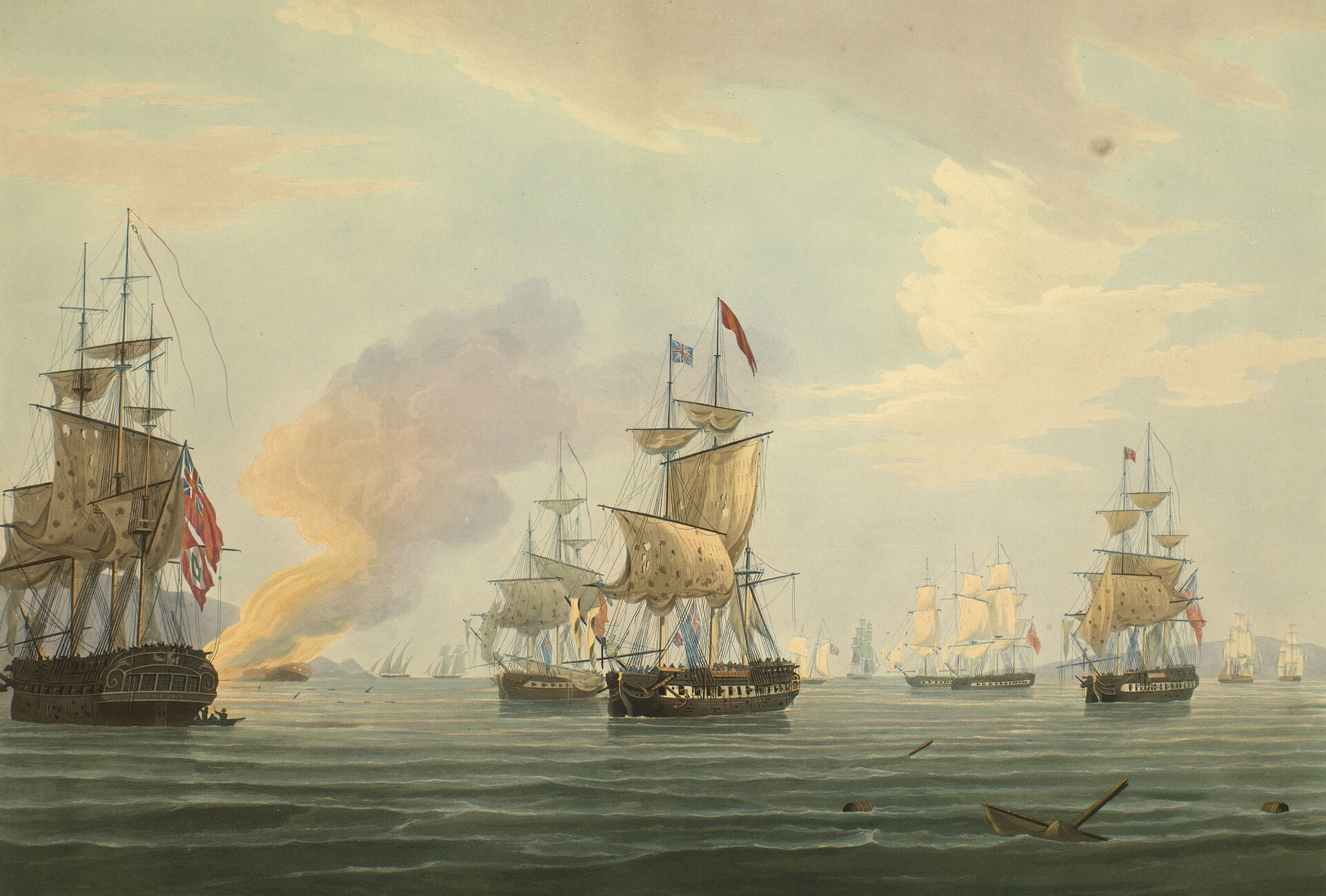
- An illustration of the Battle of Lissa, including Bellona (far left)

History

Kingdom of Italy
- Name: Bellona
- Builder: Andrea Salvini, Venice
- Laid down: 22 April 1807
- Launched: 14 June 1808
- Captured: 13 November 1811

United Kingdom
- Name: HMS Dover
- Acquired: 1811 by capture
- Fate: Sold 21 January 1836

General characteristics
- Tons burthen: 692 (bm)
- Length: Overall: 131 ft 6 in (40.1 m); Keel: 110 ft 4 1/8 in (33.6 m)
- Beam: 34 ft 4 in (10.5 m)
- Depth of hold: 8 ft 11 in (2.7 m)
- Complement: At capture:224; Frigate: 215; Troopship: 115
- Armament: At capture: 24 × 12-pounder guns + 8 × 6-pounder guns (or carronades); Troopship; Upper deck: 12 × 9-pounder guns; QD: 4 × 18-pounder carronades; Fc: 2 × 6-pounder guns

HMS Dover was a 38-gun troopship, previously the Italian corvette Bellona, launched at Venice in 1808. She was captured at Lissa in 1811. She served as a troopship and transport until circa 1819. She then became the flagship for the Admiral commanding the Leith station. She was used for harbour service from 1825, and was sold in 1836.

== Corvette Bellona ==
Lieutenant de vaisseau Duodo commissioned Bellone in 1810. Between 22 February and 7 March 1810 she underwent coppering.

HMS Amphion, which was under the command of Captain William Hoste, the commander of a British squadron, captured Bellona on 3 March 1811 at the Battle of Lissa. Hoste reported that Bellona was under the command of M. Didon. Actually, Bellona's captain was Giuseppe Duodo, who was killed during the battle; Bellona had suffered some 70 casualties.

== HMS Dover ==
Bellona arrived at Deptford in September. She was fitted as a troopship between March and July 1812 while at Deptford. Although a key reference states Dover was never commissioned, that appears incorrect. A.Y.Dray commissioned her in 1812 as a troopship. In September 1812 Lloyd's List reported that the frigate Dover had arrived at Portsmouth on 1 September from Anholt. On 13 January 1813 the "Dover frigate" arrived at Torbay, having escorted seven merchantmen from Portsmouth.

In 1813 Dover was in the Mediterranean. She then sailed to the North American station.

On 28 June 1813 Dover recaptured the schooner Harriet, A. Winterholt, master. She had been carrying oil and sealskins when she had been captured. The prize crew took her into Halifax, Nova Scotia.

On 30 June Dover captured the ship Liverpool Packet, S.Nicholas, master. The prize court in Halifax restored her to her owners. (Note: Liverpool Packet, of 376 tons (bm), had been launched in Boston in 1810. Although the records of the Vice-Admiralty court indicate that she had been restored to her owners, she is no longer listed in LR in 1814.) The report in Lloyd's List referred to Dover as the "Dover M[an of] [War].

At some point in 1813 Dover captured the brig Roscio, F.Jose Carva, master.

Dover departed the Solent on 4 April 1813, as part of a convoy headed to Halifax. In August Dover was at Quebec. Forty-one and officers and men from Dover joined the British squadron on Lake Erie, arriving on 5 September.

The frigate Dover arrived at Deal from Quebec on 19 July 1814, and sailed for Portsmouth two days later.

Commander Robert Henley Rogers was appointed to Dover on 30 July 1814. On 18 September, five rifle companies of the 95th Regiment of Foot were embarked aboard the Dover and the Fox. They were part of a squadron, with Bedford as flagship, that carried the advance guard of Major General Keane's army, which was moving to attack New Orleans. Rogers was promoted to post-captain on 2 September 1816.

At the end of 1814, Dover took part in the Gulf Campaign as a troopship. Under the rules of prize-money, the troopship Dictator shared in the proceeds of the capture of the American vessels in the Battle of Lake Borgne on 14 December 1814. (Note: 'Notice is hereby given to the officers and companies of His Majesty's ships Aetna, Alceste, Anaconda, Armide, Asia, Bedford, Belle Poule, Borer, Bucephalus, Calliope, Carron, Cydnus, Dictator, Diomede, Dover, Fox, Gorgon, Herald, Hydra, Meteor, Norge, Nymphe, Pigmy, Ramillies, Royal Oak, Seahorse, Shelburne, Sophie, Thames, Thistle, Tonnant, Trave, Volcano, and Weser, that they will be paid their respective proportions of prize money.') (Note: A first-class share of the prize money was worth £34 12s 9¼d; a sixth-class share, that of an ordinary seaman, was worth 7s 10¾d.)

On 29 May 1815 the A[rmed] S[hip] Dover arrived at Portsmouth from Havana.

=== Post-war ===
On 16 April 1816 the Dover frigate sailed from Portsmouth for the West Indies. On 13 May she was at Madeira and the next day she sailed for Barbados, which she reached on 3 June.

Between September and November 1819 Dover was fitted for a guardship at Leith. Captain Arthur Batt Bingham took command of Dover on 25 September 1819. At the time she was serving as the flagship to Admiral Robert Otway. In 1820 she served as the flagship to Admiral Sir John P. Beresford. On 14 November 1821 command of Dover passed to Captain Samuel Chambers.

Between October 1824 and February 1825 Dover was at Deptford being fitted as a receiving ship.

Between June and July 1831 Dover was at Deptford for the quarantine service.

== Fate ==
Dover was sold at Deptford on 21 January 1836 for £1000.
