= HMS Thames (1805) =

Frigate of the Royal Navy

History

United Kingdom
- Name: HMS Thames
- Ordered: 1 May 1804
- Builder: Chatham Dockyard (Shipwright Robert Seppings)
- Laid down: July 1804
- Launched: 24 October 1805
- Commissioned: November 1805
- Fate: Broken up October 1816

General characteristics
- Class & type: 32-gun fifth rate Thames-class frigate
- Tons burthen: 66127/94 bm
- Length: 127 ft 1 in (38.74 m) (overall); 107 ft (33 m) (keel)
- Beam: 34 ft 1 in (10.39 m)
- Depth of hold: 11 ft 9 in (3.58 m)
- Complement: 220
- Armament: Upper deck: 26 × 12-pounder guns; QD: 8 × 24-pounder carronades; Fc: 4 × 24-pounder carronades

HMS Thames was a 32-gun fifth-rate Thames-class frigate of the Royal Navy, launched in 1805 at Chatham.

A wartime lack of building materials meant that Minerva and her class were built to the outdated 50-year-old design of the Richmond class, and were thus smaller than many contemporary frigates.

== Service history ==
Thames was expected to be commissioned by Captain John Loring but a delay in such meant that Thames's first captain was actually Captain Bridges Taylor, who commissioned Thames in November 1805. On 9 July 1806, Thames, Phoebe and Blanche were directed towards Shetland to intercept French frigates that were menacing the fishing vessels. Thames initially served on the Downs Station before briefly serving on the Jamaica Station and in the Mediterranean from 3 March 1807. In April 1808 Thames returned to Portsmouth where Captain George Waldegrave assumed command and then sailed again for the Mediterranean. On 27 July 1810 Thames was serving alongside the sloops Pilot and HMS Weazel; together they drove an enemy convoy ashore at Amantea and took six gunboats, two large galleys, and twenty-eight transports with their subsequent landing parties. The destruction of the convoy halted Joachim Murat's planned invasion of Sicily. From June 1810 Thames served with the sloop Cephalus; on 16 June a convoy the ships had been following was found beached at Cetraro and a landing party of 180 men burned the entire convoy. After this command of Thames transferred to Captain Charles Napier.

On 20 July 1811 Thames and Cephalus attacked and captured the fort at Porto del Infrischi and in turn captured eleven gunboats, an armed felucca, and fourteen merchant vessels. In September Thames came under the orders of Captain Henry Duncan in HMS Imperieuse and together they captured ten Neapolitan gunboats at Palinuro on 2 November. In the spring of 1812 Napier became the senior naval officer on the coast of Calabria and as such Thames and Pilot captured Sapri on 14 May after a two-hour bombardment, capturing twenty-nine merchant vessels. In February 1813 it was found that the island of Ponza was a hub for enemy privateers and so on 16 February Thames and the frigate HMS Furieuse embarked two battalions of soldiers and landed them under fire at Ponza on 26 February. With support from the frigates the soldiers took the heights of the island, inducing its governor to surrender.

In April Captain John Purvis replaced Napier in command, taking Thames to Sheerness where she was refitted as a troopship between August 1813 and January 1814 to serve on the North America Station under the command of Commander Kenelm Somerville. In August 1814 Thames, now under Commander Charles Leonard Irby, participated in the expedition up the Patuxent River to attack the Chesapeake Bay Flotilla, which resulted in the burning of Washington. Under the rules of prize-money, Thames shared in the proceeds of the capture of the American vessels in the Battle of Lake Borgne on 14 December 1814. (Note: A first-class share of the prize money was worth £34 12s 9 1/4d; a sixth-class share, that of an ordinary seaman, was worth 7s 10 3/4d.) (Note: 'Notice is hereby given to the officers and companies of His Majesty's ships Aetna, Alceste, Anaconda, Armide, Asia, Bedford, Belle Poule, Borer, Bucephalus, Calliope, Carron, Cydnus, Dictator, Diomede, Dover, Fox, Gorgon, Herald, Hydra, Meteor, Norge, Nymphe, Pigmy, Ramillies, Royal Oak, Seahorse, Shelburne, Sophie, Thames, Thistle, Tonnant, Trave, Volcano, and Weser, that they will be paid their respective proportions of prize money.') Thames sailed from Mobile Point to Apalachicola, Florida, with a despatch from Vice Admiral Cochrane to Edward Nicolls to advise those at the British post at Prospect Bluff that the Prince Regent had ratified the peace treaty.

On 22 April 1815 Thames departed Bermuda and arrived in Portsmouth on 9 May 1815 the command of Commander William Walpole. On 6 June 1815, Thames, with Hydra and Alceste, departed Portsmouth and sailed for Quebec. They returned on 26 August, arriving at Plymouth. She returned from Guadeloupe to Portsmouth in October 1815, and then was duly sent to Le Havre. She was broken up at Plymouth in October 1816.
