= HMS Bucephalus (1808) =

Frigate of the Royal Navy

History

United Kingdom
- Name: HMS Bucephalus
- Ordered: 19 May 1805
- Builder: William Rowe, Newcastle
- Laid down: August 1806
- Launched: 3 November 1808
- Completed: 17 June 1809
- Commissioned: March 1809
- Fate: Broken up September 1834

General characteristics
- Tons burthen: 975 61/94 (bm)
- Length: 150 ft (45.7 m) (gundeck); 126 ft 6 1/8 in (38.6 m) (keel)
- Beam: 38 ft (11.6 m)
- Depth of hold: 12 ft 1 in (3.7 m)
- Complement: 254
- Armament: Gundeck: 26 × 18-pounder guns; QD: 2 × 9-pounder guns + 10 × 24-pounder carronades; Fc: 2 × 9-pounder guns + 2 × 24-pounder carronades

HMS Bucephalus was a 32-gun frigate launched at Portsmouth on 3 November 1808. Bucephalus was present during the Invasion of Java. She was later reduced to 18-guns and converted into a troopship at Woolwich Dockyard in 1814.

She was part of a squadron that carried the advance guard of Major General Keane's army, which was moving to attack New Orleans, part of the Gulf Campaign. Under the rules of prize-money, the troopship Bucephalus shared in the proceeds of the capture of the American vessels in the Battle of Lake Borgne on 14 December 1814. (Note: A first-class share of the prize money was worth £34 12s 9 1/4d; a sixth-class share, that of an ordinary seaman, was worth 7s 10 3/4d.) (Note: 'Notice is hereby given to the officers and companies of His Majesty's ships Aetna, Alceste, Anaconda, Armide, Asia, Bedford, Belle Poule, Borer, Bucephalus, Calliope, Carron, Cydnus, Dictator, Diomede, Dover, Fox, Gorgon, Herald, Hydra, Meteor, Norge, Nymphe, Pigmy, Ramillies, Royal Oak, Seahorse, Shelburne, Sophie, Thames, Thistle, Tonnant, Trave, Volcano, and Weser, that they will be paid their respective proportions of prize money.')

After the end of the War of 1812, she returned to Great Britain, arriving at Portsmouth on 30 May 1815.
