= HMS Herald (1806) =

Sloop of the Royal Navy

- Plan showing the quarterdeck and forecastle, inboard profile, and upper deck for Herald

History

United Kingdom
- Name: HMS Herald
- Ordered: 12 July 1805
- Builder: Carver and Corney, Littlehampton
- Laid down: December 1805
- Launched: 27 December 1806
- Completed: 1 April 1807 at Portsmouth Dockyard
- Commissioned: March 1807
- Out of service: Broken up 9 September 1817

General characteristics
- Class & type: 18-gun Cormorant-class sloop
- Tons burthen: 42938/94 bm
- Length: 108 ft 10 in (33.2 m) (overall); 90 ft 11 1/2 in (27.7 m) (keel)
- Beam: 29 ft 9 1/2 in (9.1 m)
- Depth of hold: 8 ft 11 1/2 in (2.73 m)
- Sail plan: Full-rigged ship
- Complement: 121
- Armament: Upper deck: 16 × 32-pounder carronades; QD: 6 × 18-pounder carronades; Fc: 2 × 6-pounder guns and 2 × 18-pounder carronades

HMS Herald was an 18-gun ship-sloop of the Cormorant class in the Royal Navy, launched in 1806 at Littlehampton. In 1810 she was reclassed as a 20-gun sixth rate ship (but without being re-armed), and again re-rated as 24 guns in 1817, just before she was broken up.

== Adriatic ==
Herald was commissioned in March 1806 under Captain G. M. Hony. On 18 May 1807 he sailed her to the Mediterranean, where he proceeded to cruise off Corfu in the early stages of the Adriatic campaign. Herald attacked French shipping off the island and later in the year cruised off the Dardanelles before returning to the Adriatic off Otranto, attacking a number of coastal merchant vessels with success.

On 25 October 1807, Herald was off Otranto when she found an armed trabaccolo anchored under the fortress. Despite resistance, Herald's boats cut out the vessel, which turned out to be the French privateer César, armed with four 6-pounders. César was sailing from Ancona to Corfu with a cargo of rice and flour. All but four of the crew escaped. Herald suffered four men wounded.

In January 1808 Commander George Jackson took command. Herald operated off the Italian coasts, capturing or destroying numerous French and Italian merchant ships during the year.

In August 1810 Herald was re-rated as a 20-gun post ship, though Jackson did not receive his promotion until one year later, in August 1811. In the meantime, on 9 May 1811, boats from Herald and Pilot cut out four coasting vessels from the town of Monastarrachi.

== War of 1812 ==
On 4 July 1812, Jackson sailed Herald for Jamaica. There she captured the American ship Venus on 17 December. (Note: The first-class share, that is Jackson's share, of the prize money was worth £624 12s 7d, i.e., several years' salary. A sixth-class share, that of an ordinary seaman, was worth £12 19s 0 3/4d, or about seven to eight months' salary.)

On 1 January 1813, Captain Clement Milward was nominated Acting-Captain of Herald; he was confirmed in the position on 28 May. Captain Milward took command of Herald off Halifax, Nova Scotia.

Operating off the American coast during the War of 1812, Herald captured one English, one French and four American vessels during 1813, all of which she sent to Nassau, New Providence.

- English vessel Lune, in ballast, taken 3 June;
- French vessel Vengeance, carrying wine, silks, &c. taken 27 June; (Note: The first-class share for Vengeance was worth £47 0s 1 3/4d; a sixth-class share was worth 12s 6 3/4d.)
- American vessel Adeline Cecilia, in ballast, taken 13 August 1813;
- American vessel Jane, carrying cotton and sugar, taken 13 December 1813;
- American vessel Eliza and Ann, carrying sundries, taken 21 December; and
- American vessel Liberty, carrying sundries, taken 23 December.

On 14 January 1814, Herald captured the American ship Adolphus, and shared the prize money, by agreement, with Forester and Contest. (Note: A first-class share was worth £38 11s 9d; a sixth-class share was worth 18s 9 3/4d.) In 1814, Herald took part in the Gulf Campaign. From March 1814 onwards, Anaconda, under orders of Captain Milward of Herald, was sent to patrol off the Mississippi, and would remain here for the rest of the year. Under the rules of prize-money, Herald shared in the proceeds of the capture of six American vessels in the Battle of Lake Borgne on 14 December 1814. (Note: A first-class share of the prize money was worth £34 12s 9 1/4d; a sixth-class share, that of an ordinary seaman, was worth 7s 10 3/4d.) (Note: 'Notice is hereby given to the officers and companies of His Majesty's ships Aetna, Alceste, Anaconda, Armide, Asia, Bedford, Belle Poule, Borer, Bucephalus, Calliope, Carron, Cydnus, Dictator, Diomede, Dover, Fox, Gorgon, Herald, Hydra, Meteor, Norge, Nymphe, Pigmy, Ramillies, Royal Oak, Seahorse, Shelburne, Sophie, Thames, Thistle, Tonnant, Trave, Volcano, and Weser, that they will be paid their respective proportions of prize money.') Then, with Nymphe, Thistle, Pigmy and two bomb vessels, Herald went up the Mississippi River to create a diversion at Fort St. Philip.

In accordance with Cochrane's orders, Herald moored off Prospect Bluff, and on 5 April 1815 embarked troops of the 5th Battalion of the West India Regiment. She arrived in Jamaica on 10 May. Herald accompanied a convoy, arriving in Portsmouth on 25 September. Captain Milward left Herald on 11 October 1815.

== Fate ==
On 9 September 1817, Herald was broken up at Chatham Naval Dockyard.
