= HMS Pigmy (1810) =

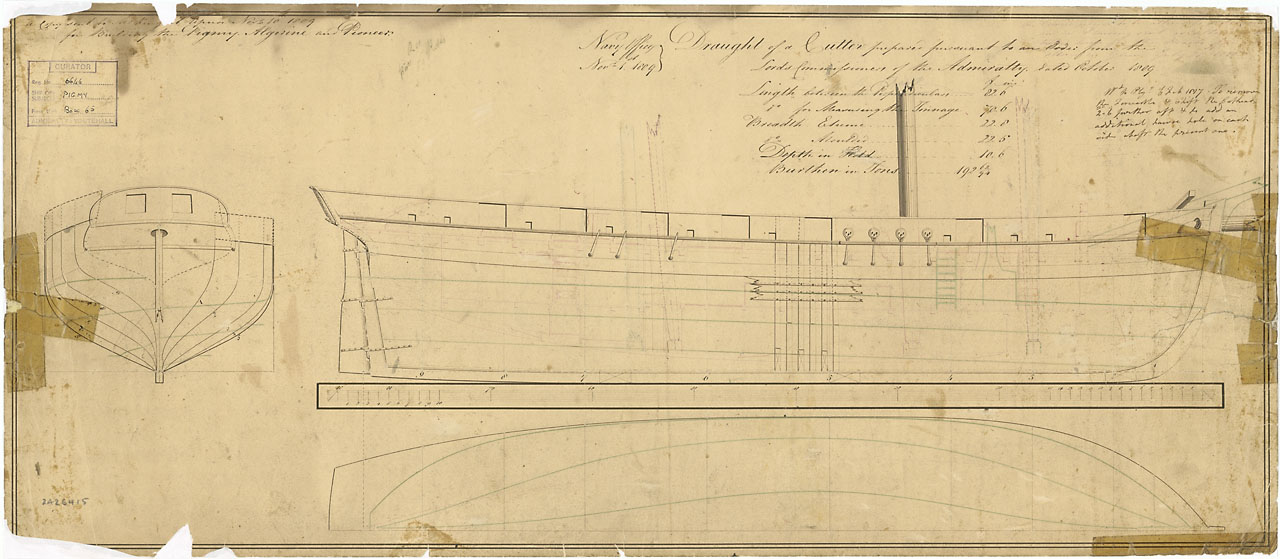
- Pigmy

History

United Kingdom
- Name: HMS Pigmy
- Ordered: 2 October 1809
- Builder: John King, Upnor
- Laid down: November 1809
- Launched: 24 February 1810
- Commissioned: 25 June 1810
- Fate: Sold at Plymouth on 21 May 1823

General characteristics
- Class & type: Pigmy-class 10-gun schooner
- Tons burthen: 196 73/94 (bm)
- Length: 82 ft 10 in (25.2 m) (overall); 70 ft 8 3/8 in (21.5 m) (keel)
- Beam: 22 ft 11 in (7.0 m)
- Depth of hold: 10 ft 1 in (3.1 m)
- Propulsion: Sails
- Complement: 60
- Armament: 10 × 12-pounder carronades

HMS Pigmy was a Pigmy-class 10-gun schooner of the Royal Navy. She was launched in February 1810. She served on the North Sea and North American stations before she was sold in 1823.

== Career ==
Pigmy was commissioned in April 1810 under Lieutenant Edward Moore. On 26 July, the cutters Pygmy and Decoy ran on shore and destroyed a French privateer lugger between Gravelines and Dunkirk. Later in 1811 she was converted from a cutter to a schooner.

During 1812, Lieutenant William Hutchinson commanded Pygmy, which served in the Downs. In the following year, she served in the Baltic.

War of 1812: In 1814 Pygmy came under the command of Lieutenant Richard Crossman and served in North America. On 1 November 1814, she arrived at Bermuda. She participated in the Battle of Lake Borgne. (Note: A first-class share of the prize money was worth £34 12s 9 1/4d; a sixth-class share, that of an ordinary seaman, was worth 7s 10 3/4d.) (Note: 'Notice is hereby given to the officers and companies of His Majesty's ships Aetna, Alceste, Anaconda, Armide, Asia, Bedford, Belle Poule, Borer, Bucephalus, Calliope, Carron, Cydnus, Dictator, Diomede, Dover, Fox, Gorgon, Herald, Hydra, Meteor, Norge, Nymphe, Pigmy, Ramillies, Royal Oak, Seahorse, Shelburne, Sophie, Thames, Thistle, Tonnant, Trave, Volcano, and Weser, that they will be paid their respective proportions of prize money.') After the Battle of Lake Borgne, Nymphe, Thistle, Herald and Pigmy with two bomb vessels, went up the Mississippi River to create a diversion. These latter five ships were to take part in the Bombardment of Fort St. Philip (1815).

== Fate ==
She was reconverted to a cutter in 1817. She was sold at Plymouth on 21 May 1823.

== Bibliography ==
- Fraser, Edward & Carr-Laughton, L. G. (1930). The Royal Marine Artillery 1804–1923, Volume 1 [1804–1859]. London: The Royal United Services Institution. OCLC 4986867.
- Winfield, Rif (2008). British Warships in the Age of Sail 1793–1817: Design, Construction, Careers and Fates. Seaforth. ISBN 978-1-86176-246-7.
