= HMS Asia (1811) =

Vengeur-class ship of the line

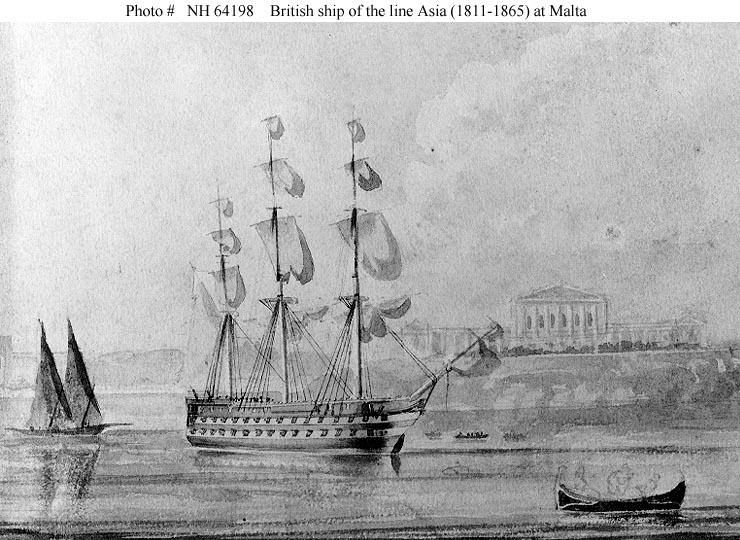
- Watercolor by an unidentified artist, depicting the ship at Malta.

History

United Kingdom
- Name: Asia
- Ordered: 13 July 1807
- Builder: Josiah & Thomas Brindley, Frindsbury
- Laid down: February 1808
- Launched: 2 December 1811
- Commissioned: February 1812
- Fate: Broken up, 1865

General characteristics (as built)
- Class & type: Vengeur-class ship of the line
- Tons burthen: 1,763 9/94 (bm)
- Length: 175 ft 7 in (53.5 m) (gundeck)
- Beam: 47 ft 11 in (14.6 m)
- Draught: 17 ft 4 in (5.3 m) (light)
- Depth of hold: 21 ft (6.4 m)
- Sail plan: Full-rigged ship
- Complement: 590
- Armament: 74 muzzle-loading, smoothbore guns; Gundeck: 28 × 32 pdr guns; Upper deck: 28 × 18 pdr guns; Quarterdeck: 4 × 12 pdr guns + 10 × 32 pdr carronades; Forecastle: 2 × 12 pdr guns + 2 × 32 pdr carronades

HMS Asia was a 74-gun third rate Vengeur-class ship of the line built for the Royal Navy in the first decade of the 19th century. Completed in 1812, she played a minor role in the Napoleonic Wars.

== War of 1812 ==
On 26 July 1813 Asia sailed from Negril as escort to a convoy bound for London.

At the end of 1813, John Wainwright (Royal Navy officer) was appointed to command the Asia. Asia served as the flagship for Vice Admiral Sir Alexander Cochrane from 27 January 1814 onwards.

On 1 February 1814, Asia departed Portsmouth, headed for Halifax. She arrived at Bermuda in the company of HMS Superb on 6 March 1814.

Wainwright was exchanged commands with Captain Alexander Skene of HMS Tonnant on 9 June 1814.

Asia was off Chesapeake Bay in July 1814. (Note: From Captain Skene, of His Majesty's ship Asia, dated in the Chesapeake, the 20th of July, stating that her boats, under the orders, of Lieut. Forster, had destroyed a deep laden schooner in Cherrystone creek, under a fire from field-pieces and small arms; from which service they returned without sustaining any loss.) The Royal Marine Artillery company of the 3rd Battalion, Royal Marines were ferried from Bermuda to the Chesapeake aboard Asia, via HMS Tonnant. During the bombardment of Fort McHenry, Asia was moored off Baltimore, along with Seahorse, Severn and Surprise. Asia was among Admiral Alexander Cochrane's fleet moored off New Orleans at the start of 1815. In support of the attack on New Orleans, 107 Royal Marines from Asia were disembarked. Under the rules of prize-money, the Asia shared in the proceeds of the capture of the American vessels in the Battle of Lake Borgne on 14 December 1814. (Note: 'Notice is hereby given to the officers and companies of His Majesty's ships Aetna, Alceste, Anaconda, Armide, Asia, Bedford, Belle Poule, Borer, Bucephalus, Calliope, Carron, Cydnus, Dictator, Diomede, Dover, Fox, Gorgon, Herald, Hydra, Meteor, Norge, Nymphe, Pigmy, Ramillies, Royal Oak, Seahorse, Shelburne, Sophie, Thames, Thistle, Tonnant, Trave, Volcano, and Weser, that they will be paid their respective proportions of prize money.')

Tonnant left the anchorage off Mobile Bay on 18 February and arrived in Havana on 24 February 1815, accompanied by Asia and Vengeur. The Asia departed Havana on 2 March whilst in the company of HMS Brazen, and arrived at Portsmouth on 5 May 1815. On 23 June 1815, she set sail for Trieste, to embark a cargo of quicksilver for transit to the Caribbean. She was moored at Gibraltar, from 13 to 17 September, arriving at Jamaica on 4 November 1815. She departed on 27 November 1815, returned to Portsmouth on 19 January 1816, and was held in quarantine.

Renamed as HMS Alfred in 1819. From 1822 to 1828 Alfred was reduced to a 50-gun fourth rate frigate and was eventually broken up in 1865.

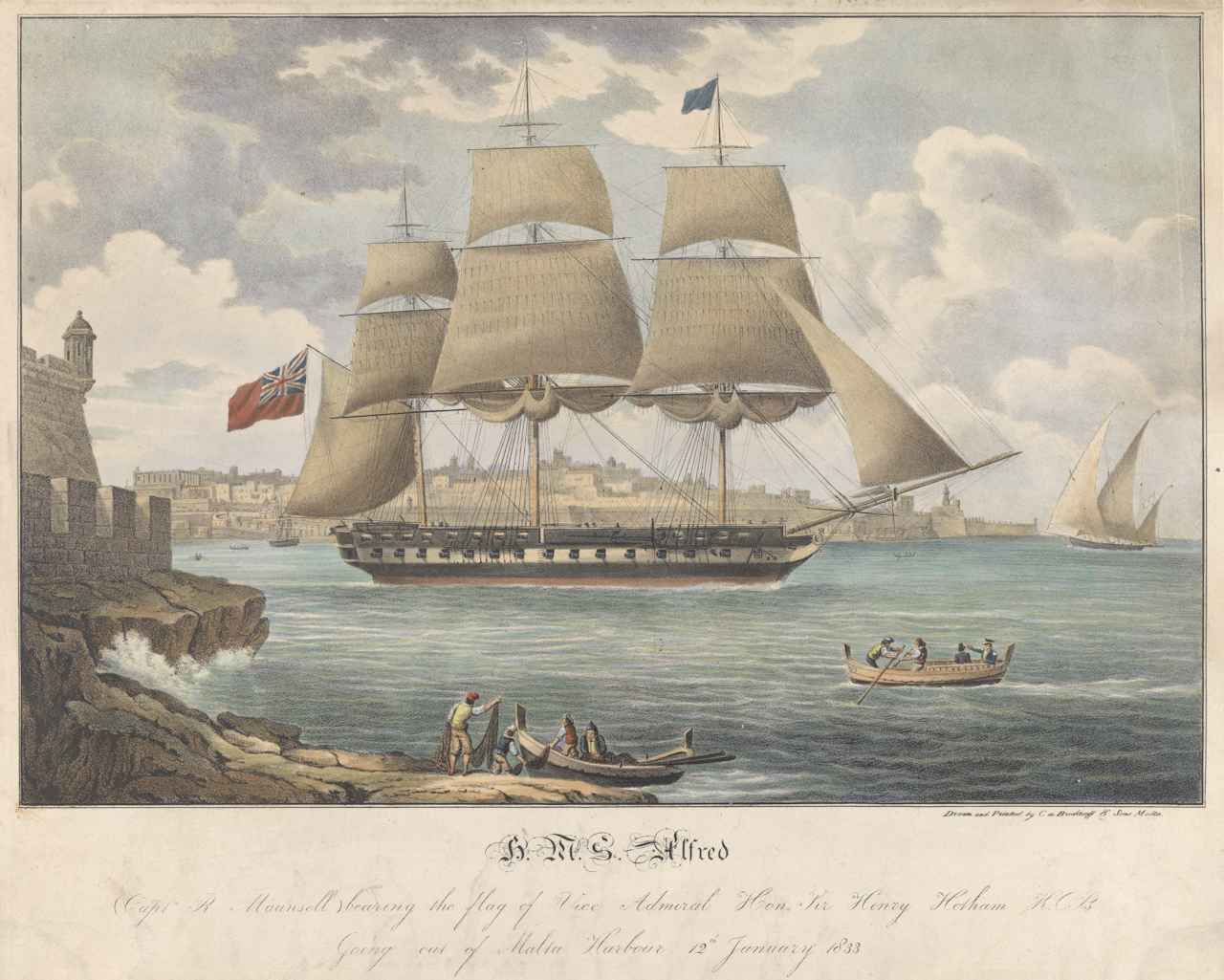
Alfred leaving Malta Harbour 12 January 1833
