= HMS Hydra (1797) =

Frigate of the Royal Navy

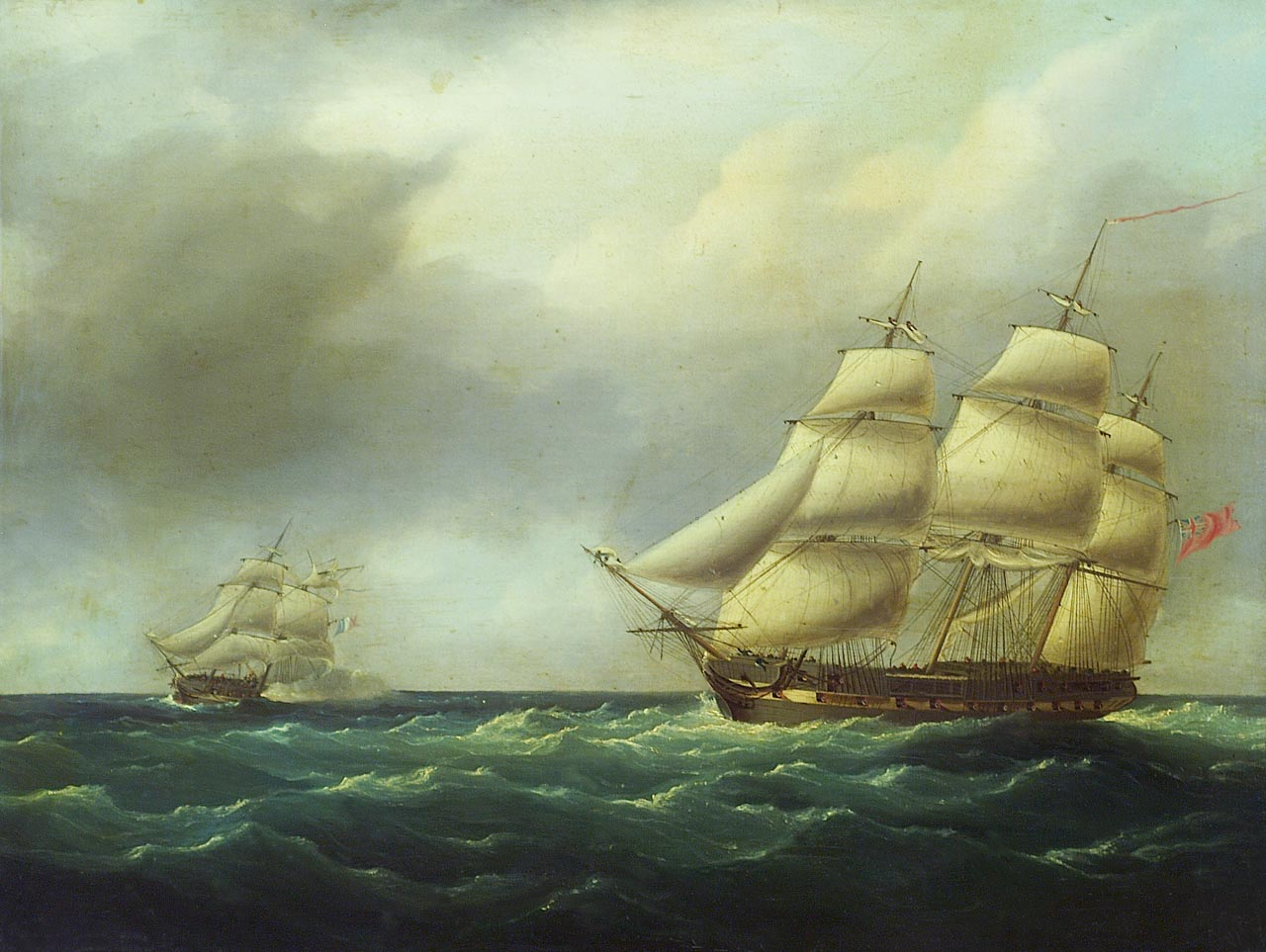
- The action Between HMS Hydra and the Furet, 27 February 1806

History

Great Britain
- Name: HMS Hydra
- Operator: Royal Navy
- Ordered: 30 April 1795
- Builder: William Cleverley, Gravesend
- Laid down: November 1795
- Launched: 13 March 1797
- Commissioned: 25 June 1797 after fitting out at Woolwich Dockyard
- In service: 1797
- Out of service: 1817
- Fate: Sold 13 January 1820.

General characteristics
- Class & type: Fifth-rate
- Tons burthen: 1,02459/94 (bm)
- Length: 148 ft 3 in (45.2 m)
- Beam: 39 ft 6 1/2 in (12.1 m)
- Depth of hold: 12 ft 8 in (3.9 m)
- Propulsion: Sail
- Complement: 284 (raised later to 315)
- Armament: UD: 28 × 18-pounder guns; QD: 12 × 32-pounder carronades; Fc: 2 × 12-pounder guns + 2 × 32-pounder carronades

HMS Hydra launched in 1797 was a fifth-rate frigate of the Royal Navy. From 1813 to 1817 she served as a troopship. She was sold in 1820.

She was built to the design of the captured French frigate Melpomene (taken in 1794).

== French Revolutionary Wars ==
Hydra was commissioned in April 1797 under Captain Sir Francis Laforey.

At the action of 30 May 1798, Hydra, in company with the bomb vessel HMS Vesuvius and the cutter HMS Trial, ran aground the French corvette Confiante, which was destroyed. The corvette Vésuve and an unnamed cutter also ran ashore, but the British were not able to destroy them.

On 16 December 1800 Traveller foundered in the Atlantic Ocean (48°00′N 49°15′W). Hydra rescued the crew. Traveller had been on a voyage from Martinique to London.

Hydra was anchored at the Nore on Sunday 17 May 1801 (as recorded in the journal of Captain Matthew Flinders of HMS Investigator).

== Napoleonic Wars ==
Under the command of Captain George Mundy, for eight years from October 1802 to September 1810, she had an active career in the Napoleonic Wars, including the Blockade of Cadiz (1805-1806).

On 24 June 1803 Hydra and His Majesty's hired armed cutter Rose captured the French privateer Phoebe. Phoebe, of four guns, two swivel guns, and 33 men, had left Cherbourg some seven days earlier. (Note: Phoebe had been commissioned in Cherbourg in 1800 with Guillaume Mosquerer, master. She made another cruise under François Folliot in 1800. French sources show her having departed in May or June 1803 with 28 men and 4 guns, and being captured by Hydra on 25 June.) The gun-brig HMS Starling recaptured the brigs William, of Sunderland, and Diana, of London, and their cargoes. She also recaptured Egyptian, of Waterford, which had been sailing in ballast. Phoebe had captured them before she herself was captured. Hydra and Starling arrived at Portsmouth on 29 June.

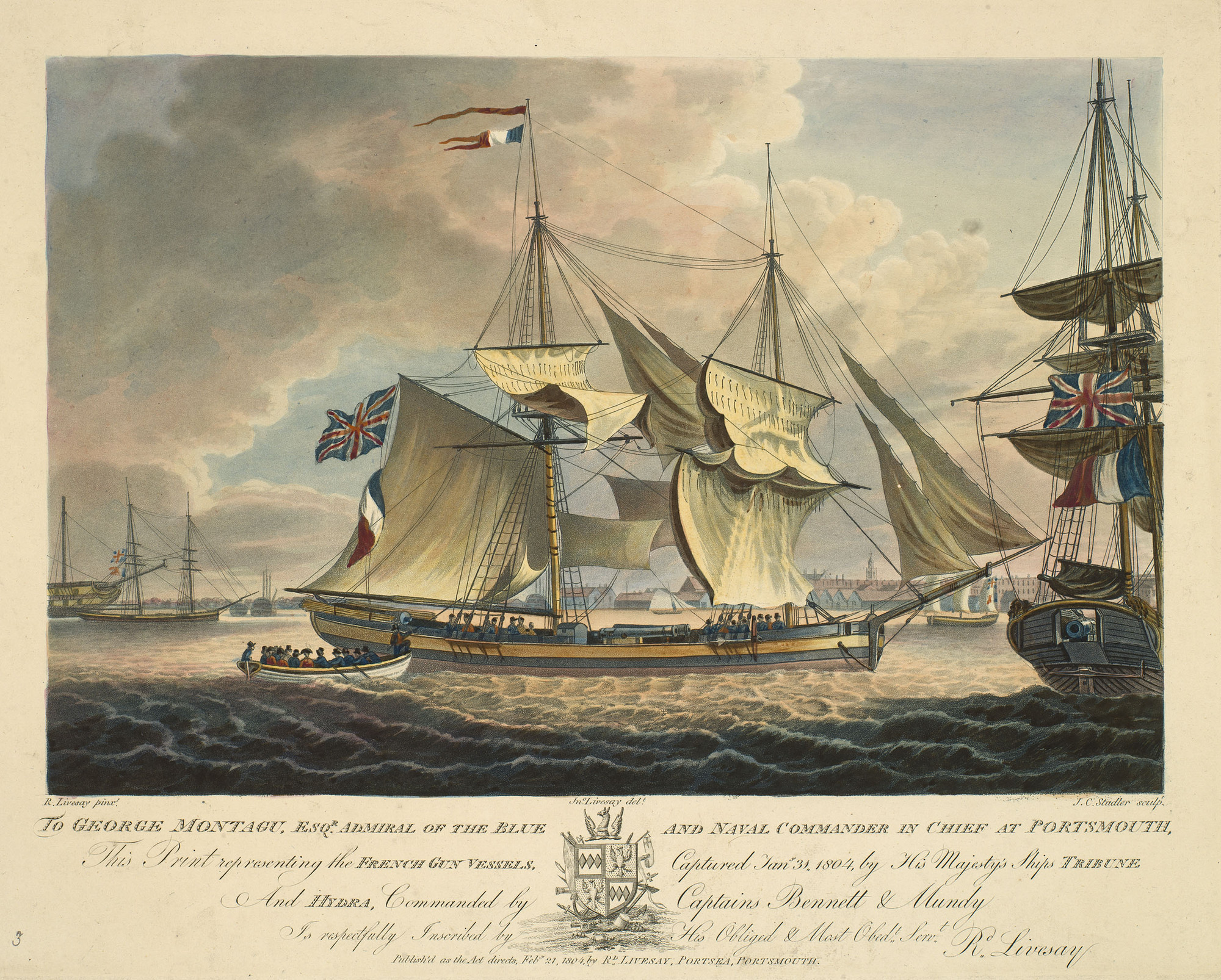
A print representing the French gun vessels captured 11 January 1804, by Tribune and Hydra and brought to Portsmouth

On 30 January 1804, Hydra and Tribune, operating independently, encountered a French flotilla of 20 vessels off Cape La Hogue, and captured three gun brigs and a lugger. The gun brigs were of 100 tons burthen and new, having been launched only ten days earlier and having been rigged while still in the stocks. They had troops aboard that had embarked the day after the launch. The vessels were from Saint-Malo, sailing to Cherbourg.

Hydra captured brig No. 51 and lugger no. 411. The brig was armed with three 24-pounder guns and was under the command of a lieutenant de vaisseau. She had 50 men aboard, a lieutenant and 26 of whom were from the 32nd Regiment of the Line. The lugger was armed with one 18-pounder, and had 36 men aboard. A lieutenant and 26 of whom were soldiers from the same regiment.

Fortune captured brigs No. 43 and No. 47. These brigs too had three guns each, one 18 and two 24-pounders. No. 43 had 50 men aboard and No. 47 had 60. The reports of the number of men captured are contradictory. Still, both brigs were carrying troops from the same 32nd Regiment (or Demi-Brigade). Before capturing the two brigs, Tribune had destroyed a large boat. Captain Bennet of Tribune further reported that he had seen a frigate, which he believed was Hydra, capture a lugger and continue in pursuit of a brig.

Hydra and Tribune shared the proceeds of the prize money and the head money for brigs Nos. 43, 47, and 51, and the lugger No. 411. However, because the two British vessels were there in different capacities, Hydra being part of a squadron under Admiral Sir James Saumarez, commander of Royal Navy forces in the Channel Islands, and Tribune reporting directly to Admiral George Montagu, Commander-in-Chief, Portsmouth, the division of the captains' shares of the prize money was complex. (Note: The prize money arising out of this action was subject to an unusual split with respect to the two captains involved. Three-eights of the total prize money was allocated to the first-class shares, that is, the money that would go to Mundy and Captain R.H.A. Bennet of Tribune. One of the captains (and the prize money notice does not make clear which one), was subject to the rule requiring him to share one third of his share with his flag officer. The flag officer's share was therefore one-sixth of the amount for captains and flags, and amounted to £128 18s 11½d (16.7%). The captain who had to share received two-sixths, or £257 17s 11d (33.3%). The captain not subject to having to share with the flag officer received £386 16s 10½d (50%). A seaman received £1 4s.)

Hydra shared with Phoebe in the proceeds from the capture between 9 and 15 November 1804 of the vessels Paulina and Sesostris. (Note: A first-class share of the prize money for Paulina and Sesostris was worth £591 4s 6d; a fifth-class share was worth £2 7s 4d. In addition, there were 28 supernumeraries aboard Phoebe or Hydra who were entitled to a fifth-class share for Paulina only. Each supernumerary received £1 3s 2d.)

After Admiral Lord Nelson defeated the Franco-Spanish fleet at the battle of Trafalgar on 21 October 1805, four French frigates and the brig Furet took refuge at Cadiz, where they remained into February 1806. To try to lure them out, Vice-Admiral Cuthbert Collingwood pulled his ships-of-the-line ten leagues out to sea, leaving only Hydra, under Captain George Mundy, and the brig-sloop Moselle in close blockade. On 23 February a strong easterly wind drove the British off their station, which led the French commander, Captain Louis-Charles-Auguste Delamarre de Lamellerie, to seize the opportunity to escape. On the evening of 26 February Hydra and Moselle were three leagues west of the Cadiz lighthouse when they sighted the French vessels. Mundy began firing rockets and alarm guns to alert Collingwood, while sailing parallel to the escaping French squadron. Mundy then sent Carden in Moselle to try to locate the British fleet. On the morning of 27 February Moselle reached Collingwood, who despatched three frigates to try to catch the French.

In the meantime, Hydra had managed to isolate the French brig from her companions, and after a two-hour chase, captured Furet. The French frigates did not come to their brig's aid, and after firing a pro forma broadside, Furet surrendered. Furet was armed with eighteen long 9-pounder guns, and had a crew of 130 men under the command of lieutenant de vaisseau Demay. She was provisioned for a cruise of five months. Under the rules of prize-money, Moselle shared in the proceeds of the capture of Furet. During the next six months, Lamellerie's frigate squadron cruised the Atlantic, visiting Senegal, Cayenne and the West Indies, but failed significantly to disrupt British trade.

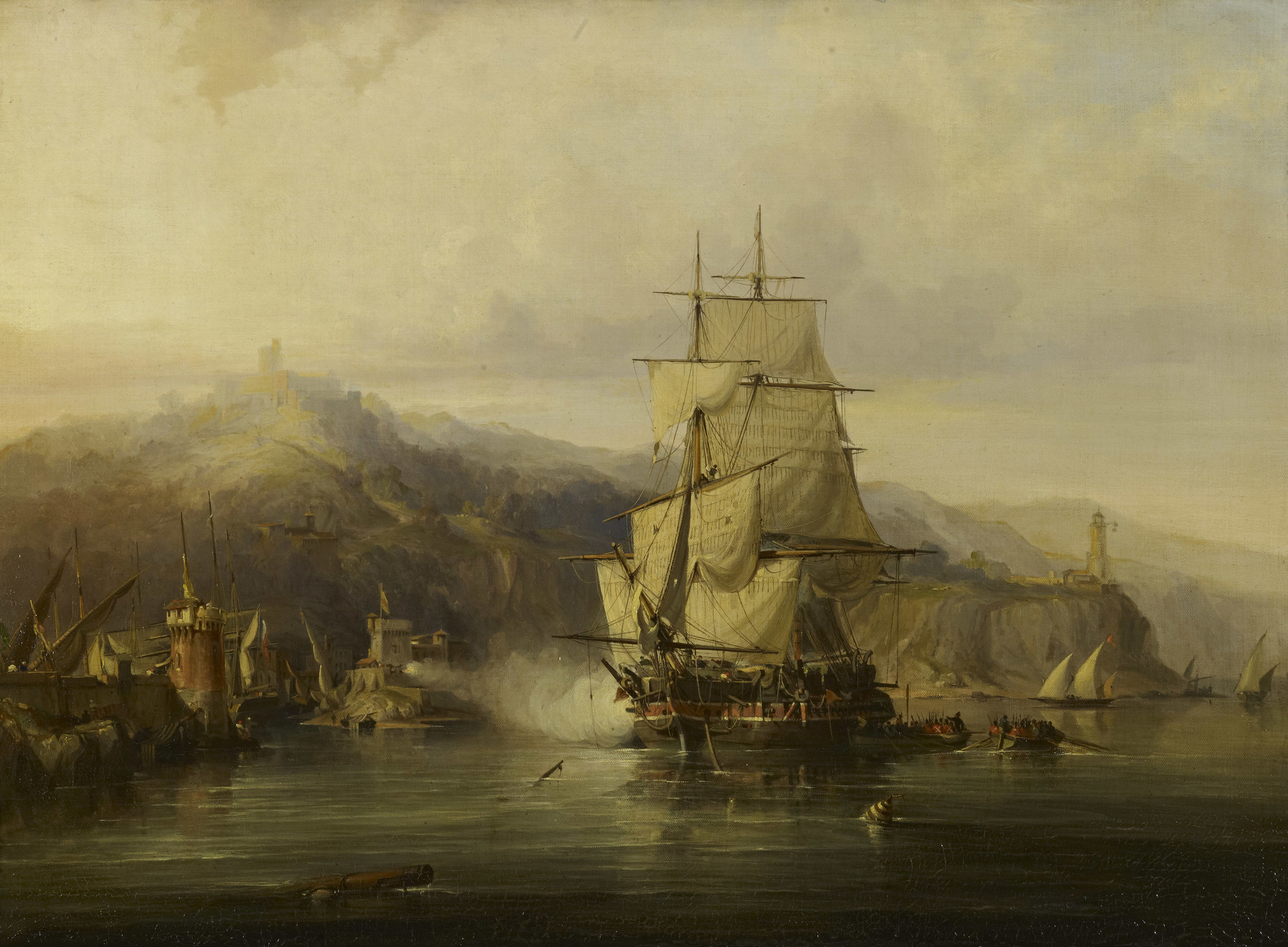
Capture of the fort & vessels in the Harbour of Begu, by HMS Hydra, Capt. G. Mundy 7 August 1807

Hydra took part in the Peninsular War in 1807, including the bombardment of the defences of the Catalan port of Begur on 7 August 1807.

In September 1810 Hydra was laid-up in ordinary at Portsmouth.

During a refit at Portsmouth in 1813, Hydra was fitted as a troopship and recommissioned in July 1813 under Commander Joseph Digby. From then until finally paying off in 1817 she was employed as a troopship and, in that capacity, for example, Captain Robert Lawson's Company, 8th Battalion Royal Artillery, left Spain on 22 July 1814, on board HMS Hydra, bound for Plymouth. Under the rules of prize-money, the troopship Hydra shared in the proceeds of the capture of six American vessels in the Battle of Lake Borgne on 14 December 1814. (Note: 'Notice is hereby given to the officers and companies of His Majesty's ships Aetna, Alceste, Anaconda, Armide, Asia, Bedford, Belle Poule, Borer, Bucephalus, Calliope, Carron, Cydnus, Dictator, Diomede, Dover, Fox, Gorgon, Herald, Hydra, Meteor, Norge, Nymphe, Pigmy, Ramillies, Royal Oak, Seahorse, Shelburne, Sophie, Thames, Thistle, Tonnant, Trave, Volcano, and Weser, that they will be paid their respective proportions of prize money.')

The Hydra and Dictator returned to Portsmouth on 12 May 1815. On 6 June 1815, Thames, with Hydra and Alceste, departed Portsmouth and sailed for Quebec, arriving there on 26 July. They returned on 26 August, arriving at Plymouth. In November 1815 Commander Daniel Roberts commissioned Hydra for the West Indies.

== Fate ==
Hydra was laid up in November 1817 at Portsmouth. She was sold 31 January 1820 for £2410 to Job Cockshot.
