= HMS Borer (1812) =

Gun-brig of the Royal Navy

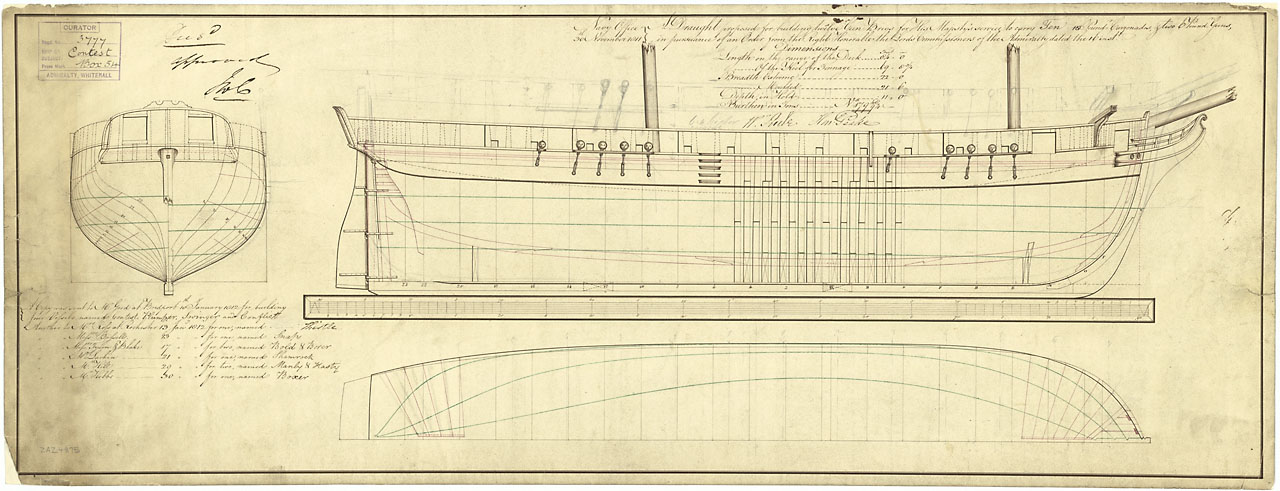
- Borer

History

United Kingdom
- Name: HMS Borer
- Ordered: 16 November 1811
- Builder: Tyson & Blake, Bursledon
- Launched: 27 July 1812
- Commissioned: August 1812
- Honours and awards: Naval General Service Medal with clasp "8 Apr Boat Service 1814"
- Fate: Sold on 12 October 1815

General characteristics
- Class & type: Bold-class gun-brig
- Tons burthen: 18384/94 bm
- Length: 84 ft 6 in (25.8 m) (overall); 70 ft 2 3/4 in (21.4 m) (keel)
- Beam: 22 ft 2 1/4 in (6.8 m)
- Depth of hold: 11 ft 0 in (3.4 m)
- Sail plan: Brig
- Complement: 60
- Armament: 10 × 18-pounder carronades + 2 × 6-pounder bow chasers

HMS Borer was a 14-gun Bold-class gun-brig of the Royal Navy built by Tyson & Blake at Bursledon. She was launched in 1812 and sold off in 1815.

== Design and construction ==
The Bold class were a revival of Sir William Rule's Confounder-class gun-brig design of 1804. They were armed with ten 18-pounder carronades and two 6-pounder bow chasers. Built at Bursledon by Tyson & Blake, Borer was launched on 26 June 1812 and commissioned under Commander Richard Coote.

== Service ==
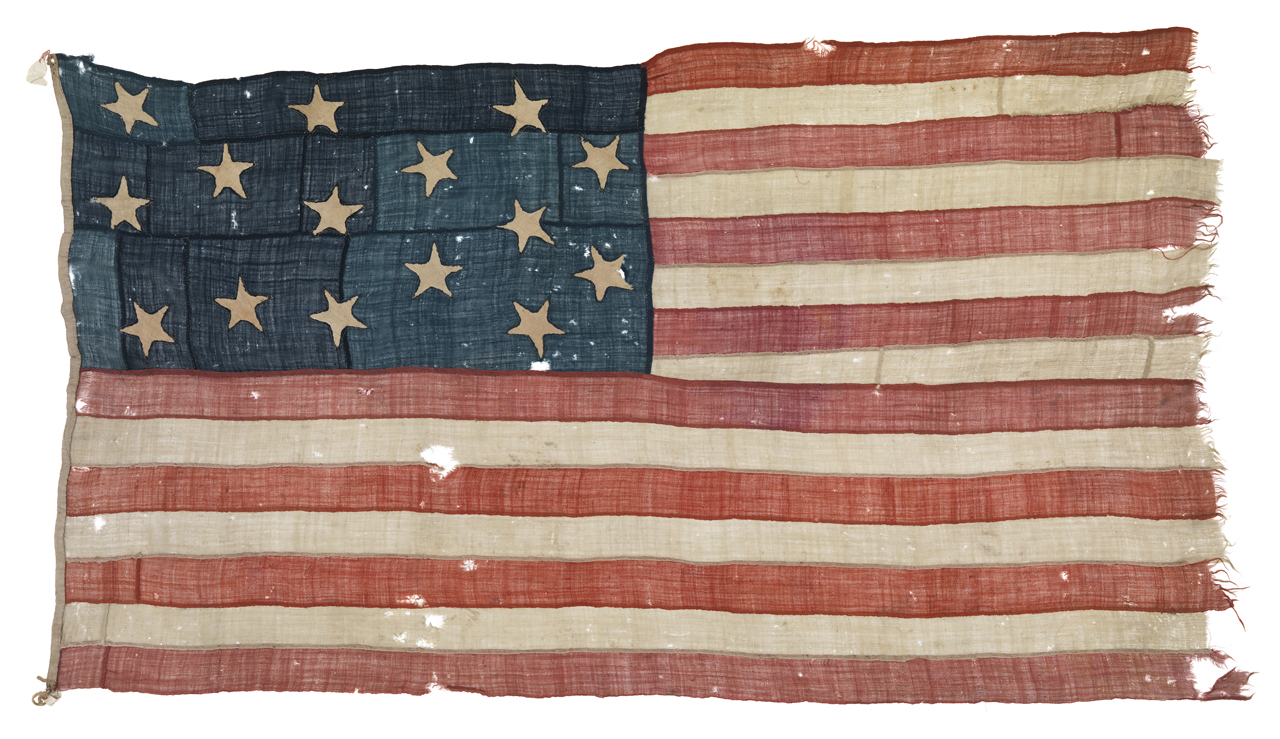
Civil ensign of an American merchant brig captured by Borer during the War of 1812

From 7–8 April 1814, ships' boats of the Hogue, Endymion, Maidstone and Borer attacked Pettipague point. In 1847 the Admiralty awarded the Naval General Service Medal with clasp "8 Apr Boat Service 1814" to all surviving claimants from the action. The raid was commanded by Coote, who was promoted as a result of the successful outcome, as was Lieutenant Pyne who assisted him.

Commander William Rawlins took over from Commander Coote in May 1814. During December 1814, Borer was involved in the resupply of the British post at Prospect Bluff. The Borer was present with Vice Admiral Alexander Cochrane's fleet off the coast of New Orleans. Under the rules of prize-money, the Borer shared in the proceeds of the capture of the American vessels in the Battle of Lake Borgne on 14 December 1814. (Note: 'Notice is hereby given to the officers and companies of His Majesty's ships Aetna, Alceste, Anaconda, Armide, Asia, Bedford, Belle Poule, Borer, Bucephalus, Calliope, Carron, Cydnus, Dictator, Diomede, Dover, Fox, Gorgon, Herald, Hydra, Meteor, Norge, Nymphe, Pigmy, Ramillies, Royal Oak, Seahorse, Shelburne, Sophie, Thames, Thistle, Tonnant, Trave, Volcano, and Weser, that they will be paid their respective proportions of prize money.')

Borer was moored off Apalachicola, Florida in March 1815.

With peace declared, the Borer's last task was to pick up some Royal Marines and some escaped slaves, to join Robert Cavendish Spencer departing from the British outpost at Prospect Bluff. When the Borer stopped off in Bermuda, one of the people that the ship's captain spoke to did not approve of freeing slaves, and a minor diplomatic incident started when a "Gentleman of respectability at Bermuda" wrote an anonymous tip-off to the American authorities. The Borer left Bermuda on 25 May, accompanied by the transport vessel Daedalus, and arrived at Halifax on 3 June. Thereafter, the Borer arrived at Portsmouth on 10 July 1815.
