= HMS Volcano (1804) =

Sloop of the Royal Navy

History

United Kingdom
- Name: Jason
- Owner: W. Row
- Builder: William Rowe, St Peter's, Newcastle
- Launched: 1803
- Fate: Sold June 1804

United Kingdom
- Name: HMS Heron (1804–1810); HMS Volcano (1810–1816)
- Acquired: by purchase, 1804
- Commissioned: 1804
- Decommissioned: 1806
- Recommissioned: 1810
- Decommissioned: 1815
- Fate: Sold, 28 August 1816

United Kingdom
- Name: Jason
- Owner: Gardner
- Acquired: 1816 by purchase
- Fate: Wrecked 1821

General characteristics
- Type: 16-gun ship-sloop / bomb vessel
- Tons burthen: 338, or 339, or 340
- Length: Overall:97 ft 6 in (29.7 m); Keel:75 ft 9 in (23.1 m)
- Beam: 29 ft 0 in (8.8 m)
- Depth of hold: 12 ft 11 in (3.9 m)
- Complement: Sloop:70; Bomb:67
- Armament: Sloop: 14 × 18-pounder carronades + 2 × 9-pounder guns; Bomb:1 × 13" mortar + 1 × 10" mortar + 4 × 24-pounder carronades + 6 × 6-pounder guns

HMS Heron was originally the merchant vessel Jason, launched at Newcastle in 1803, that the Admiralty purchased in 1804 for the Royal Navy for use as 16-gun ship-sloop under the name HMS Heron. During the Napoleonic Wars she served as a convoy escort on the Leeward Islands station. Then in 1810 the Admiralty had her converted into a bomb vessel and renamed her HMS Volcano. As Volcano she served during the War of 1812, and in particular participated in the Battle of Baltimore. The Admiralty sold her in 1816. New owners returned her to mercantile service under her original name of Jason. She was wrecked in 1821.

== Career ==
Jason appeared in the Register of Shipping (RS) for 1804 with Otway, master, W. Row, owner, and voyage Newcastle to Liverpool.

=== As Heron ===
The Admiralty purchased Jason in 1804. After the Treaty of Amiens, Britain had disarmed while France rearmed, so on the resumption of war the Admiralty found itself short of vessels for convoy escort. Because of the urgency of the situation, the Admiralty purchased twenty three-masted mercantile vessels; one was Jason. Jason came into service with her original masts and yards even though she was under-canvassed and therefore slow, and without a cargo in her hold tended to roll; she became HMS Heron.

She was commissioned in June 1804 under Commander John Edgecombe. At the end of the year he escorted a convoy of merchantmen from England to Barbados. Once in Barbados Edgecombe faced a dilemma. On the one hand there were reports of an enemy fleet in the Windward Isles that could threaten Barbados. On the other hand, a fleet of 28 merchantmen and two transports had gathered in Carlisle Bay, awaiting a warship to escort them to Halifax or Britain. Edgecombe decided to escort the convoy, risking court martial for leaving his duty station without orders. Five of the ships parted company for Halifax. Argus, off Cape Clear, met six others that were going up the St. Georges Channel. Heron accompanied the remainder to the Downs, where the convoy arrived on 2 August 1805. The captains of the 19 vessels that Edgecombe had convoyed signed a letter, interceding with the Admiralty on his behalf. The letter proved moot as the Admiralty had already approved Edgecombe's actions.

Edgecombe realized that Heron was too slow to catch enemy cruisers; instead he decided to use guile. While she was sailing to Antigua with a convoy he noticed a schooner approaching. He hoisted American colours and dressed a midshipman as a woman. The schooner showed French colours and approached. Unfortunately, the French vessel was too low for Heron's guns to bear and rolled too much for her crew to secure grapnels. All that the British could do was raise the British ensign and discharge a volley of musketry before the French vessel escaped. Cambrian later captured the schooner, which turned out to be Matilde, of 16 guns.

Thereafter, Heron escorted convoys to Halifax, Newfoundland and Bermuda until December 1806 when Edgecombe, whose health had been impaired, left. Heron then remained in ordinary until 1810 when the Admiralty had her converted into a bomb vessel and renamed her Volcano.

=== As Volcano ===
Commander David Price assumed command of Volcano on 6 December 1813. In the summer of 1814 he sailed her to North America to join Sir Alexander Cochrane's fleet off the entrance to Baltimore harbor where she joined in the 25 hour bombardment of Fort McHenry starting the morning of 13 September 2014. Along with her were four other bomb vessels and a Congreve rocket vessel, Erebus. The entire attack squadron consisted of 16 vessels, and launched over 1,500 bombs during the attack, but succeeded in killing only four Americans and wounding 24 before giving up the attack.

Later, Volcano served in the Potomac under Rear Admiral Pulteney Malcolm. On 31 October 1814, while escorting a merchantman to Jamaica, Volcano nearly succeeded in capturing the 7-gun American privateer schooner Saucy Jack. The two vessels exchange fire before the American took advantage of her greater speed and escaped. The British lost three men killed; the Americans lost seven killed and 14 wounded.

At the end of 1814, Volcano took part in the Gulf Campaign. Under the rules of prize-money, Thames shared in the proceeds of the capture of the American vessels in the Battle of Lake Borgne on 14 December 1814. (Note: 'Notice is hereby given to the officers and companies of His Majesty's ships Aetna, Alceste, Anaconda, Armide, Asia, Bedford, Belle Poule, Borer, Bucephalus, Calliope, Carron, Cydnus, Dictator, Diomede, Dover, Fox, Gorgon, Herald, Hydra, Meteor, Norge, Nymphe, Pigmy, Ramillies, Royal Oak, Seahorse, Shelburne, Sophie, Thames, Thistle, Tonnant, Trave, Volcano and Weser, that they will be paid their respective proportions of prize money.') Volcano was sent up the Mississippi, with another bomb vessel, HMS Aetna, and Herald (18), Thistle (12), and Pigmy (10) to bombard Fort St Philip. (Note: The Royal Marine Artillery was created with the express intention of mortars on bomb vessels being crewed by gunners under the control of the Royal Navy and not the British Army. When the definitive history of the Royal Marine Artillery was being written in the 1930s, this engagement was considered to be worthy of a mention as it was the last time in the conflict that exploding bomb shells were fired from a bomb vessel. Wishing to know more about the shell expenditure, they consulted the log of HMS Volcano, and this is quoted in the unit history. It is the only British eyewitness account to have been published in a printed book. Other than ship logs, there appear to be no other records.) (Note: On 30 December 1814, Vice Admiral Cochrane sent an 'Order to Captain Price, Volcano, to take Aetna under his orders and proceed off the River Mississippi') It took the British vessels from 30 December to 9 January to work the forty miles up the Mississippi to the fort, by warping and hard towing to the Plaquemines Bend, just below the fort. On 9 January 1815 Volcano dropped anchor on the south shore of the Mississippi, in a position out of the range of the fort's cannon, her mortar within range of the fort. After the British retired from New Orleans, Volcano sailed along the Gulf Coast and was present during the siege of Fort Bowyer in February 1815.

After end of the war with America, Volcano sailed for home on 5 April 1815 and arrived at Portsmouth on 31 May. Commander John Watling assumed command in June, but the Navy paid Volcano off in September.

Disposal: The Admiralty sold Volcano on 28 August 1816 for £1,100.

=== Mercantile Jason ===
New owners returned Volcano to mercantile service under her original name. She appeared in the Register of Shipping for 1818 with D. Petrie, master, Gardner, owner, and trade London–Miramichi, New Brunswick. She had undergone a "good repair" in 1818.

== Fate ==
Jason appeared in the 1822 volume of the Register of Shipping with Thompson, master, Gardiner, owner, and trade Liverpool–Charleston. She had undergone small repairs in 1819.

Lloyd's List reported on 12 June 1821 that Jason, Thomson, master, had been driven ashore on the South Breakers of St Simon's Bar (St. Simons, Georgia), where she had bilged. She had been on a voyage from Falmouth to Savannah.
