= Siege of Fort St. Philip =

The siege of Fort Saint Philip can refer to several different battles:

- Siege of Fort St. Phillip (1756) - a siege during the Seven Years' War
- Siege of Fort St. Philip (1781) - a Siege during the Spanish invasion of Minorca in the American War of Independence
- Siege of Fort St. Philip (1815) - an action in Louisiana during the War of 1812
- Battle of Forts Jackson and St. Philip - a naval engagement in Louisiana during the American Civil War
