= Rosina (1796 ship) =

History

Great Britain
- Name: Rosina
- Builder: James Walmsley, North Shields
- Launched: 1796
- Fate: Foundered 1806

General characteristics
- Tons burthen: 380, or 388 (bm)
- Armament: 1800: 2 × 3-pounder guns; 1805: 8 × 4-pounder guns

Rosina was launched at Shields in 1796. She became a West Indiaman and foundered in 1806.

== Career ==
Rosina first appeared in Lloyd's Register (LR) in 1799 with M'Kinley master, Old & Co., owners, and trade London–West Indies.

| Year | Master | Owner | Trade | Source & notes |
|---|---|---|---|---|
| 1800 | M'Kinley | Old & Co. | London–West Indies | Register of Shipping |

The Register of Shipping for 1806 showed her with M'Kinley, master, Olds & Co., owner, and trade London transport. The entry carried the annotation "Lost".

== Fate ==
Lloyd's List reported on 14 February 1806 that Rosina, M'Kinley, master, had foundered on her return journey to England from Surinam. HMS Gorgon rescued the crew and took them into Milford.
