= HMS Thistle (1812) =

Brig of the Royal Navy

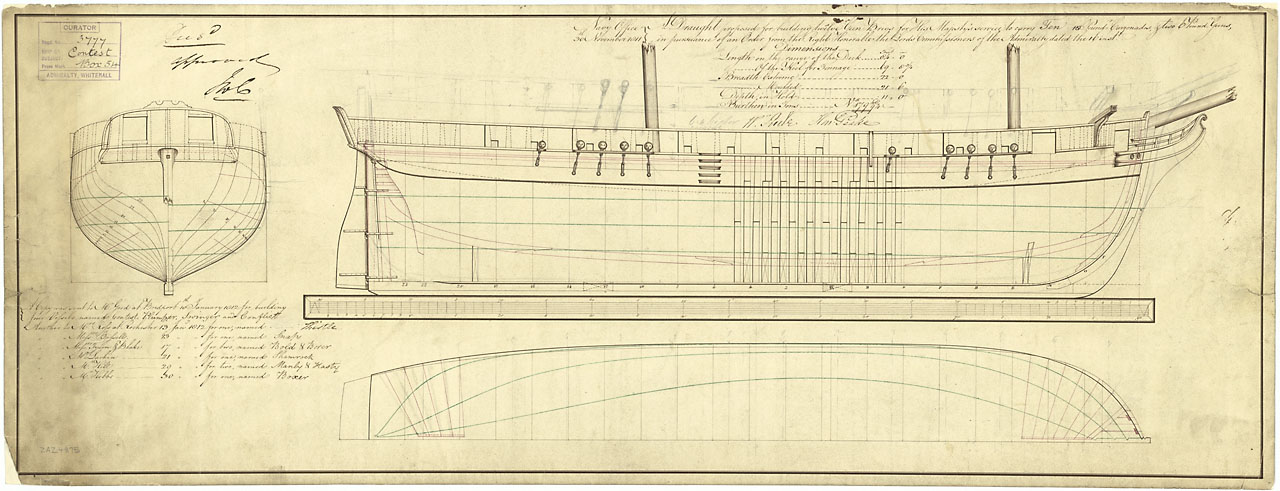
- Thistle

History

United Kingdom
- Name: HMS Thistle
- Ordered: 16 November 1811
- Builder: Mrs Mary Ross, Rochester, Kent
- Laid down: March 1812
- Launched: 13 July 1812
- Commissioned: 12 September 1812
- Fate: Broken up at Portsmouth July 1823

General characteristics
- Class & type: Bold-class gun-brig
- Tons burthen: 18639/94 bm
- Length: 84 ft 4 1/2 in (25.7 m) (overall); 70 ft 9 1/2 in (21.6 m) (keel)
- Beam: 22 ft 3 in (6.8 m)
- Depth of hold: 11 ft 0 1/2 in (3.4 m)
- Sail plan: Brig
- Complement: 50
- Armament: 10 × 18-pounder carronades + 2 × 6-pounder bow chasers

HMS Thistle was a 12-gun Bold-class gun-brig built by Mary Ross at Rochester, Kent. She was launched in 1812 and broken up at Portsmouth in July 1823.

== Design and construction ==
The Bold class were a revival of Sir William Rule's Confounder-class gun-brig design of 1804. They were armed with ten 18-pounder carronades and two 6-pounder bow chasers. Built at Rochester, Kent by Mary Ross, Bold was launched on 13 July 1812 and commissioned on 12 September 1812 under Commander James K White.

== Service ==
On 21 October 1812, Thistle arrived at Yarmouth via Gothenburg. It disembarked Edward Nicolls, having departed St Petersburg, carrying dispatches from Lord Cathcart.

In early January 1814 during the War of 1812, some crew volunteered to reinforce the squadron on the Great Lakes, together with men from Fantome and Manly. Seventy men left Halifax; they reached Kingston, Ontario on 22 March, having travelled some 900 miles in winter, almost entirely on foot. Mathew Abdy, Master of Thistle was one such volunteer, but he died of exposure in Woodstock, New Brunswick in February 1814. She was subsequently commanded by Lieutenant I. Burch during the operations in the Chesapeake, and was present during the actions at Washington and Baltimore. She was subsequently captained by Commander James Montague in autumn 1814.

Under the rules of prize-money, Herald shared in the proceeds of the capture of six American vessels in the Battle of Lake Borgne on 14 December 1814. (Note: A first-class share of the prize money was worth £34 12s 9 1/4d; a sixth-class share, that of an ordinary seaman, was worth 7s 10 3/4d.) (Note: 'Notice is hereby given to the officers and companies of His Majesty's ships Aetna, Alceste, Anaconda, Armide, Asia, Bedford, Belle Poule, Borer, Bucephalus, Calliope, Carron, Cydnus, Dictator, Diomede, Dover, Fox, Gorgon, Herald, Hydra, Meteor, Norge, Nymphe, Pigmy, Ramillies, Royal Oak, Seahorse, Shelburne, Sophie, Thames, Thistle, Tonnant, Trave, Volcano, and Weser, that they will be paid their respective proportions of prize money.') After the Battle of Lake Borgne, Nymphe with Thistle, Herald, Pigmy and two bomb vessels, went up the Mississippi River to create a diversion. These latter five ships were to take part in the Bombardment of Fort St. Philip (1815). After the end of the War of 1812, she returned to Great Britain, arriving at Portsmouth on 30 May 1815. She was paid off on 7 August 1815.

Thistle was recommissioned in May 1819, and was commanded by Lieutenant Robert Hagan, and deployed to the African station, under whose command he captured 40 sail of vessels and liberated 4000 slaves. She was broken up at Portsmouth in July 1823.
