= HMS Nymphe (1812) =

Frigate of the Royal Navy

History

United Kingdom
- Name: HMS Nymphe
- Ordered: 14 December 1810
- Builder: George Parsons, Bursledon
- Laid down: November 1811
- Launched: 13 April 1812
- Commissioned: May 1812
- Fate: Broken up

General characteristics
- Class & type: 38-gun Fifth rate frigate
- Tons burthen: 1087 9/94 (bm)
- Length: 154 ft 2 in (47.0 m) (gundeck)
- Beam: 39 ft 8 in (12.1 m)
- Depth of hold: 14 ft 4 in (4.4 m)
- Propulsion: Sails
- Sail plan: Full-rigged ship
- Complement: 284 officers and men (later 300)
- Armament: Upper deck: 28 × 18-pounder guns; QD: 2 × 9-pounder guns + 12 × 32-pounder carronades; Fc: 2 × 9-pounder guns + 2 × 32-pounder carronades

HMS Nymphe was a 38-gun fifth rate frigate of the Royal Navy, launched on 13 April 1812 at Woolwich Dockyard, and commissioned later that month. She was a Lively class of 18-pounder frigates, designed by the Surveyor of the Navy, Sir William Rule. It was probably the most successful British frigate design of the Napoleonic Wars, to which fifteen more sister ships would be ordered between 1803 and 1812.

== War of 1812 ==
The Nymphe's first captain was Farmery Predam Epworth. The Nymphe sailed for North America on 9 July 1812. The French Navy's namesake Nymphe, accompanied by the Meduse was chased by USS President and USS Congress on 10 October 1812. Whilst on the American station, she took the US privateers Montgomery on 5 May 1813, and Juliana Smith on 12 May 1813. Later that year, she took the Thomas on 29 June 1813 and Paragon on 14 August 1813.

On 10 October 1813, the Nymphe gave chase to three frigates and a brig-sloop commanded by Commodore Rodgers that had slipped out of Boston two days prior. At the start of 1814, the Nymphe was blockading Boston when USS Constitution broke out. Present aboard the Nymphe was the future historian Henry Edward Napier who kept a journal from March 1814 to September 1814, whilst blockading New England. From June 1814, she was commanded by Captain Joseph Price, and thereafter by Captain Hugh Pigot from October 1814 onwards.

Under the rules of prize-money, Nymphe shared in the proceeds of the capture of six American vessels in the Battle of Lake Borgne on 14 December 1814. The British lost 17 men killed and 77 wounded. Anaconda then evacuated the wounded. In 1821 the survivors of the flotilla shared in the distribution of head-money arising from the capture of the American gun-boats and sundry bales of cotton. (Note: A first-class share of the prize money was worth £34 12s 9 1/4d; a sixth-class share, that of an ordinary seaman, was worth 7s 10 3/4d.) (Note: 'Notice is hereby given to the officers and companies of His Majesty's ships Aetna, Alceste, Anaconda, Armide, Asia, Bedford, Belle Poule, Borer, Bucephalus, Calliope, Carron, Cydnus, Dictator, Diomede, Dover, Fox, Gorgon, Herald, Hydra, Meteor, Norge, Nymphe, Pigmy, Ramillies, Royal Oak, Seahorse, Shelburne, Sophie, Thames, Thistle, Tonnant, Trave, Volcano, and Weser, that they will be paid their respective proportions of prize money.')

The Nymphe, accompanied by the sloop-of-war HMS Herald (18 guns), the brig-of-war HMS Thistle (12 guns), the schooner HMS Pigmy (10 guns), and two bomb vessels, was ordered to create a distraction near the Mississippi. The Nymphe did not proceed up river.

In February 1815, following news of ratification of the peace treaty, the Nymphe was sent to Jamaica, to fetch the prisoners taken at Lake Borgne, and to repatriate the prisoners. She departed Jamaica, and arrived at Halifax on 26 May 1815. She arrived at Spitbank, off Portsmouth, on 17 June 1815. She was paid off on 21 August 1815.

== Later service ==
From July 1815 to May 1816, the Nymphe underwent Middling Repair at Portsmouth, and was then laid up in Ordinary. In August 1831, she was fitted as a temporary hospital ship at Portsmouth, and was at Leith by 1834. From December 1835 to May 1837, she was fitted at Chatham as a receiving ship, at a cost of £2,744. She was moored at Sheerness as a receiving ship from 1838 to 1855. She was fitted for use by the Water Police at Sheerness in July 1861. She was altered at Sheerness to a Roman Catholic Chapel from January to March 1863. In accordance with Admiralty Order dated 7 September 1871, she was renamed Handy.

== Fate ==
She was broken up at Chatham, as per Admiralty Order dated 31 December 1874. This was completed by 9 March 1875.
