= Bombardment of Fort St. Philip (1815) =

Siege during the War of 1812

- Part of battle of New Orleans and War of 1812
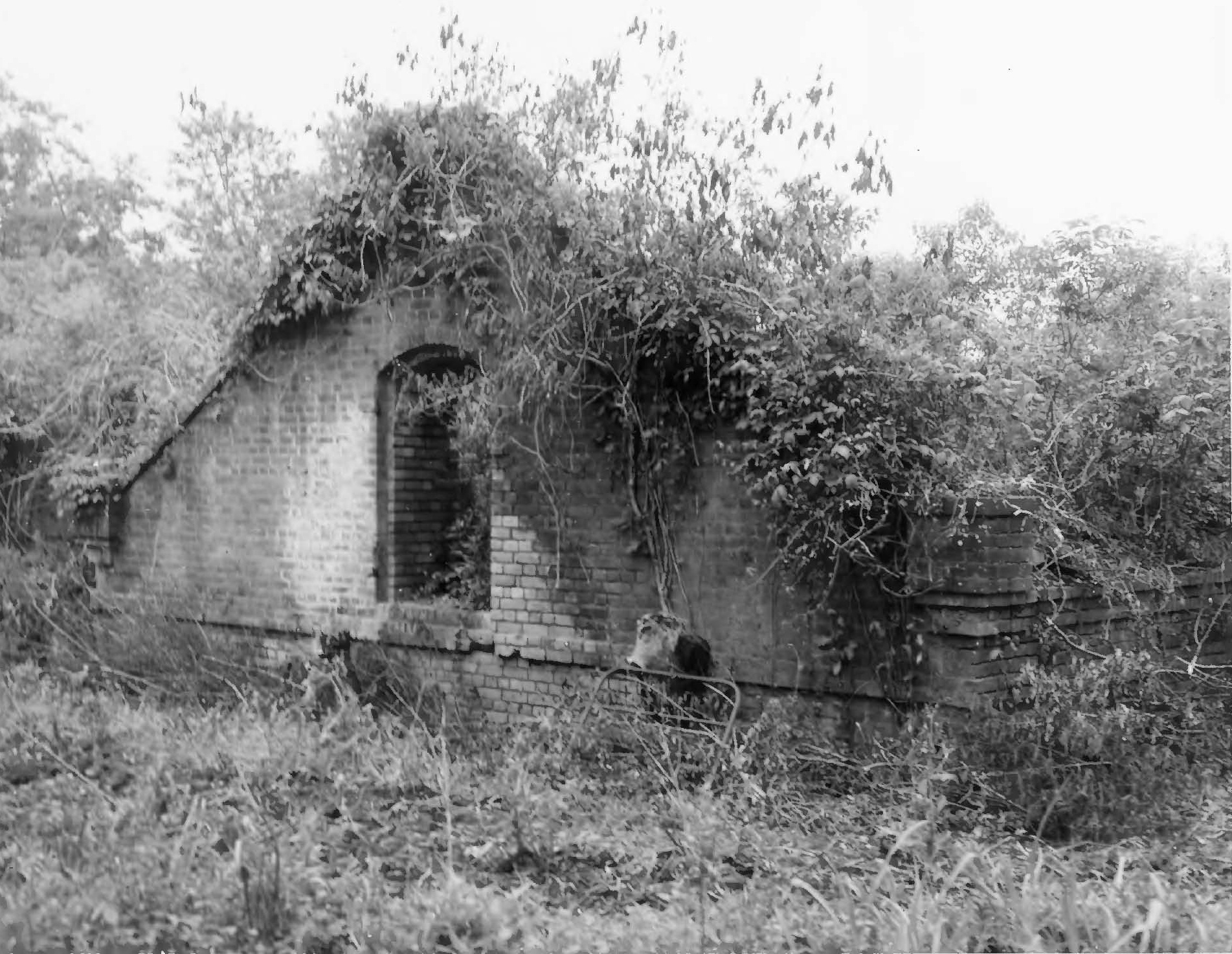
- Fort St. Philip, overgrown in the mid 20th century
Date	January 9–18, 1815
Location	Fort St. Philip, Louisiana
Result	Inconclusive

Belligerents
United Kingdom	United States

Commanders and leaders
Hugh Pigot	Walter H. Overton

Strength
1 sloop-of-war 1 brig-of-war 1 schooner 2 bomb vessels 2 bumboats	406; 35 artillery pieces 1 gunboat

Casualties and losses
None	2 killed 7 wounded

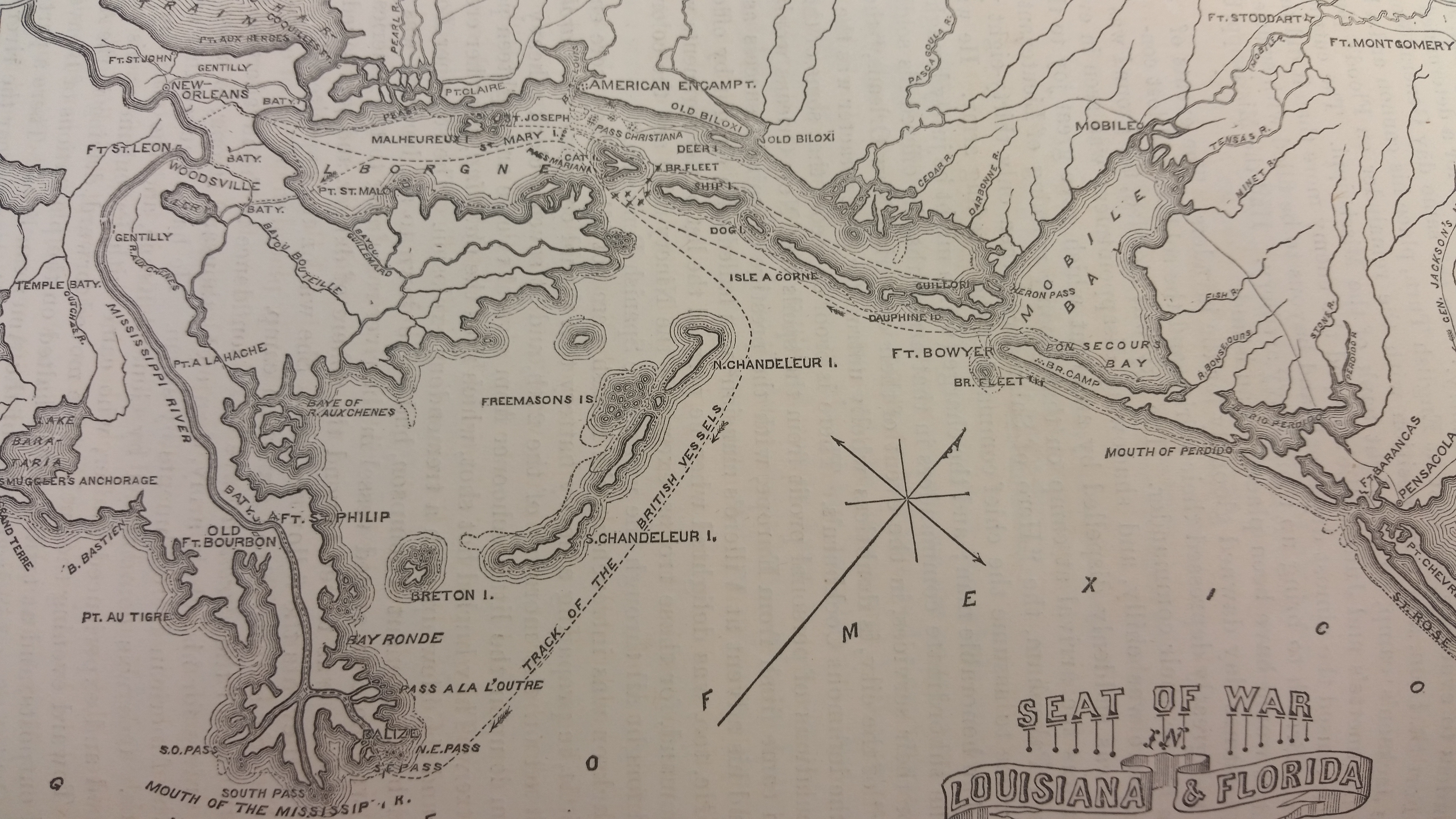
Route of British after the Battle of New Orleans

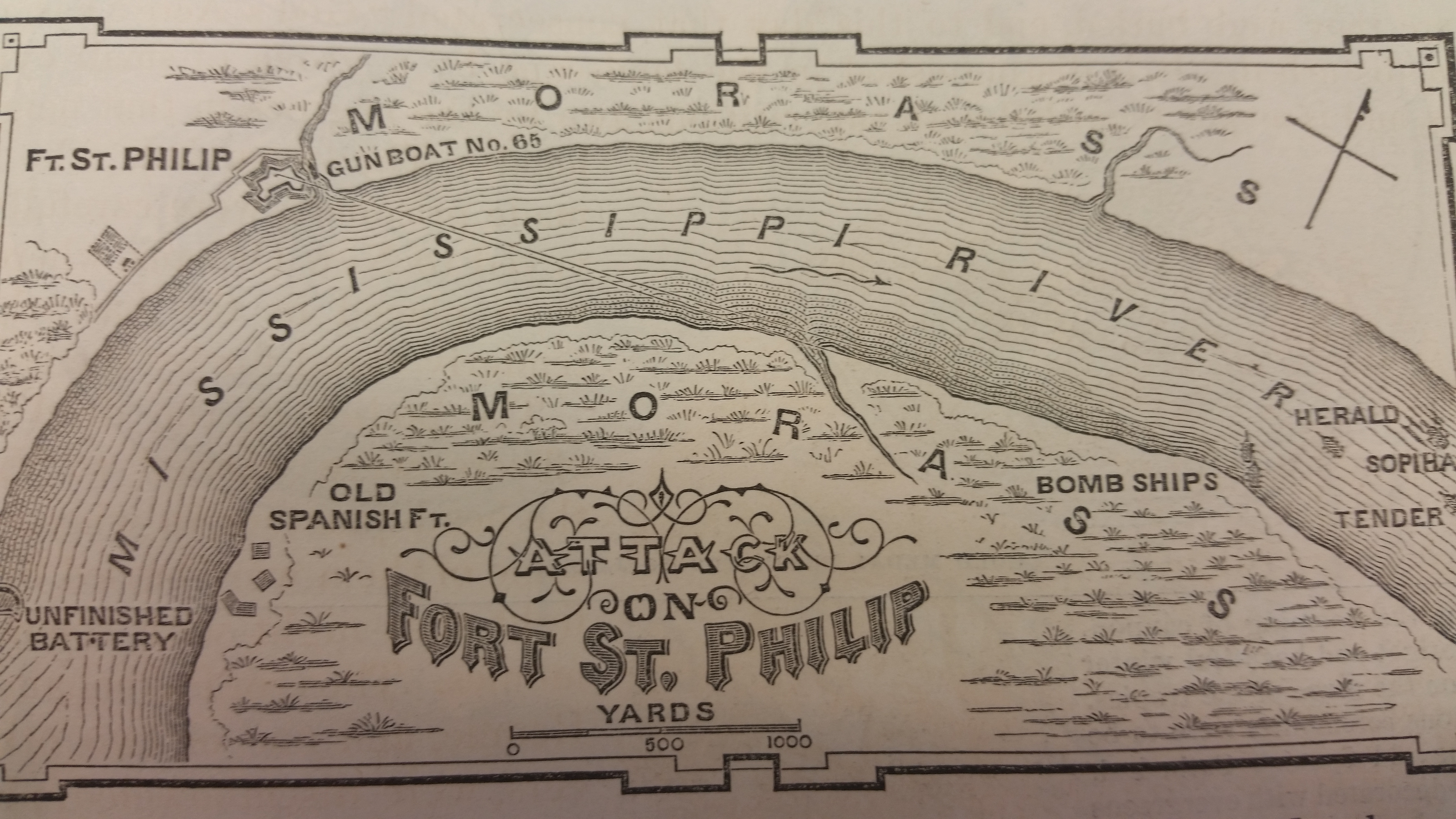
Attack on Fort St. Philip

The bombardment of Fort St. Philip was a ten day long distance bombardment of exploding bomb shells - by two Royal Navy bomb vessels, mounting a total of four mortars - against the American garrison of Fort St. Philip. The fort was unable to retaliate at the start, as the bomb vessels were out of the range of its solid shot cannon, and its mortar did not have ammunition. This was remedied by supply boats, whereby the fort counter-attacked the bomb vessels with its mortar on January 17, and the British duly withdrew. This riverine engagement took place during the concluding hostilities of the War of 1812.

== Background ==
In August 1814, Vice Admiral Cochrane had finally convinced the Admiralty that a campaign against New Orleans would weaken American resolve against Canada, and hasten a successful end to the war. (Note: Gene Allen Smith makes reference to a letter from the Secretary of the Admiralty to Cochrane dated August 10, 1814, archive reference WO 1/141. A copy of this document is accessible at The Historic New Orleans Collection' resource center, via microfilm. Smith also mentions how several Royal Navy officers had already suggested the idea of attacking Louisiana.) The Royal Navy had begun the Louisiana Campaign to capture New Orleans. The shallow coastal waters around New Orleans were protected by gunboats. The approach to New Orleans via the Mississippi was defended by Fort St Philip.

The existing structure had been constructed in 1795 by the Spanish. Fort St. Philip was described as 'an irregular work, the body a parallelogram. Approaches to it are nearly impracticable.' (Today, the fort is only accessible via boat or helicopter.) The fort mounted twenty-nine 24-pound cannons, a 6-pound cannon, two howitzers (of 5.5-inch and 8 inch calibres) and a 13-inch mortar. Additionally, two 32-pound cannons were mounted on a level with the water, in a covert way. Thirty-five pieces in all were used. A US Navy gunboat lay offshore.

In October 1814 the gunners repaired the worn-out U.S. artillery carriages and moved some to other batteries in the fort. The Americans built a signal station three miles below the installation and an earthen redoubt to defend the fort's rear side. In addition to mounting a battery for a mortar in the fort, it was suggested to construct a battery on the opposite side of the Mississippi, which would support the aforementioned two 32-pound cannons; the defence of both sides of that passage of the river being complete.

Whilst overseeing the defences in December, General Jackson ordered the construction of a battery on the other side of the river, besides increasing the strength of the fort with a mortar battery. The riverside battery was not finished though by the time the British flotilla arrived and was abandoned during the engagement. Major Latour of the US Corps of Engineers was involved with the improvement of the fort's defences, but was not here during this engagement, being resident at New Orleans, and participating in the fighting there.

They also erected overhead cover above the fort's gun batteries to prevent shell fragments from hitting the gun-crews. They destroyed the old powder magazine, replacing it with several additional magazines that they built, which had wood and dirt piled on top to protect them. The idea being that if one powder magazine was destroyed, the others would still be usable.

At the request of Jackson, at the start of December a picket was placed on duty at Fort de la Balize at the mouth of the Mississippi, who were captured by a boarding party landed by HMS Herald. Around December 15, Major Walter H. Overton was appointed as the commander of Fort St Philip. The fort was reinforced with a further company of the 7th Infantry, and by 30 volunteer free men of color militiamen. The American garrison were primarily infantry - of whom 84 militia, 163 were regulars - supported by 117 artillery men to man the fort's cannon and mortar.

On January 1, 1815, Overton was warned of an approaching British flotilla. On the morning of January 8, a look out boat arrived, to warn of the imminent approach of the flotilla.

The British vessels were ordered on December 30 to proceed up the Mississippi. (Note: On 30 December 1814, Vice Admiral Cochrane sent an 'Order to Captain Price, Volcano, to take Aetna under his orders and proceed off the River Mississippi') From January 5 through January 7, the vessels crossed the shallow channel at the bar at the mouth of the Mississippi, the Herald having grounded on the bar on January 7. It took the British vessels to January 9 to work the forty miles up the Mississippi to the fort, by warping and hard towing to the Plaquemines Bend, just below the fort.

The British flotilla consisted of the sloop-of-war HMS Herald (18 guns), the brig-of-war HMS Thistle (12 guns), the schooner HMS Pigmy (10 guns), and two bomb vessels, HMS Aetna and HMS Volcano. The rating system of the Royal Navy covered all vessels with 20 guns and above; thus, these were classified as 'unrated' vessels. They had been ordered to sail up the Mississippi, and to create a diversion, with the bombardment of the fort by launching exploding bomb shells from the bomb vessels' mortars. (Note: 'On the day of the [New Orleans] battle of January 8, a British squadron appeared in the river below Fort St. Philip, Two bomb-vessels, under the protection of a sloop, a brig, and a schooner, bombarded the fort without effect until January 18, when they withdrew.') These boats had originally been accompanied by the fifth rate HMS Nymphe, but it was too large to traverse the shallow waters of the bar at the mouth of the Mississippi. (Note: William James, comments on the geography, with the benefit of hindsight. 'But the flatness of the coast is everywhere unfavourable for the debarkation of troops and they bays and inlets being all obstructed by shoals or bars, no landing can be effected, but by boats, except up the Mississippi; and that has a bar at its mouth, which shoals to 13 or 14 feet water.') The brig and the schooner have been mis-labelled as HMS Sophia and HMS Tender in Lossing's book. This is yet another case of mistaken identity on his maps, which is unquestioned and reproduced by Remini.

== Bombardment ==
The five British boat types were visible, and clearly identified, at 10:15am. At 11:30am and 12:30pm, two bumboats advanced to a distance within a mile and a half of the fort, to take soundings of the river bottom. This prompted the fort's shore battery to open fire with their 32-pounders. Although they drove the bumboats back, eventually arriving back at the flotilla at 3:00pm, the garrison had revealed the maximum range of their solid shot cannons. At midday, in preparation for engaging the vessels, the fort's furnace was lit for heated shot. At 1:00 pm, the signal station was abandoned by the American soldiers. At 2:00pm on January 9, a British landing party occupied the signal station.

That morning, the flotilla had moored south of the fort, a distance of two and a quarter miles, or 3,960 yards. (Note: Latour clearly has an issue with imperial measurements, whereby the measurement in miles had to be converted to yards for him to understand the distance.) Early that afternoon, the two bomb vessels advanced slightly to take up positions 3,700 yards south of the fort. At 3:30pm, the bombardment of the fort commenced. Latour states that the bombardment continued day and night, this is not corroborated by Overton's account. HMS Volcano's log records that it fired fifty mortar shells that day, which calls into question the statements made by Latour. One shell fell every two minutes according to Latour, but this is not corroborated by Overton's account. During the first day of the bombardment, no American soldiers became casualties.

Latour's narration of the events continues. Due to the wet terrain from rain during most of the bombardment, mortar shells slammed into the ground, buried themselves in the wet marshy soil, and failed to explode. Some shells exploded underground, merely creating a tremor, and purportedly causing no material damage. Latour subsequently contradicts his own statement in his damage assessment and this is not corroborated by Overton. Latour claims that night, several rowboats approached the fort. Although he was not present, he claims they 'came so close as to allow us almost distinctly to hear their crews conversing', firing several rounds of grape and round shot into the fort. Latour theorises this was to divert attention from the flotilla, which could have used the distraction to pass the fort unmolested. The supposed British feint failed to distract the American soldiers, so the rowboats withdrew for the night but the British bomb vessels continued to bombard the fort at long range.

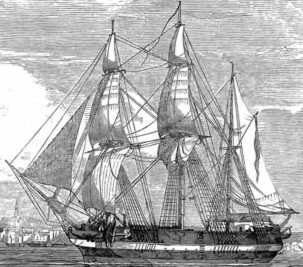
A British bomb vessel, similar to the two bomb vessels engaged in the bombardment

The next day, Latour states that 'the bombardment was continued with the same vivacity as on the former day', except the shelling ceased for two hour periods at midday and at sundown. This is not corroborated by Overton's account. HMS Volcano's log records that it fired eighty mortar shells that day, which calls into question the statements made by Latour.

There was occasional retaliatory cannon fire from the fort's batteries on the 9th and the 10th but the shot fell short. A similar barrage directed towards the two bomb vessels was made from the fort on the 11th at 4:00pm for fifteen minutes, with no effect other than possibly disturbing their fire.

Later in the day on the 11th, shrapnel struck the American flag post, nailing the halyards to the mast. The flag was repaired and replaced on the flag pole, an hour after lowering, by an American sailor who braved the British bombardment by climbing up the mast and securing the flag while shots burst overhead. The sailor completed this without injury. The evening of January 11, the bomb vessels bombarded the fort's store house, thinking it to be the powder magazine. Several shells passed straight through the store house; two exploded within it, killing one man and wounding another. The real powder magazines escaped harm with the exception of the main magazine which suffered some minor damage but failed to explode. HMS Volcano's log records that it fired ninety two mortar shells that day. The noise of the bombardment could be heard that night at the Villère Plantation, as recorded in Colonel Dickson's journal. (Note: Quote from Dickson's journal: '12 January, 1815. Thursday. Villaré's Plantation. During last night reports of heavy ordnance were heard down the river, which continued occasionally all this day; it is supposed therefore to be our flotilla attacking Plaquemine[sic].')

On the morning of the 12th four rowboats returned from having reconnoitred the fort, firing several rounds of grape and round shot via swivel guns into the fort prior to returning to the flotilla. It would appear this was misplaced by Latour as taking place on the morning of the 10th. Overton's account does not specify when this took place.

Latour states that a similar barrage, with the usual intervals, was directed upon the fort by the bomb vessels on the 12 January through to 14 January. On January 12, HMS Volcano fired 56 mortar shells until a shell burst in the mortar. Nobody was hurt, and the damage to the vessel was repaired overnight, to allow a bombardment to continue the next day.

Realizing that their weapons were not very effective during the first few days of bombardment, on January 14, Latour theorized the British re-fused all of their shells to explode over the fort (Air burst), in order to shower the garrison with shrapnel. Consequentially the American soldiers sustained another death and a few more wounded. The shells also damaged several of the fort's gun carriages. HMS Volcano's log makes no mention of re-fuzing their mortar shells. That day, the Volcano fired thirty shells and three carcasses. These British munitions managed to silence one of the two American 32-pounders, but only for an hour before repairs were completed. On this night, still the 14th, several British munitions struck the blacksmith's shop, damaging it severely.

By the night of January 15, the United States garrison had constructed in the prior 24 hours more adequate defenses around their batteries from stockpiles of wood which were being brought into the fort from the nearby forest. The powder magazines were also reinforced by another layer of dirt. Rain had fallen, with little intermission, since the start of the engagement against the British and had left the interior of the fort underwater, making it similar to a livestock pond. All of the garrison's tents were ripped up from shell fragments though they were unoccupied. That evening, several supply boats arrived at the fort, having set out 65 miles upriver from New Orleans, carrying ammunition and most importantly fuses for the fort's inoperative mortar. This helped morale of the American garrison, who were now in a better form for defense than when the engagement began.

On the morning of January 17, it had been the intent of the Herald to approach the Fort and to make an armed reconnaissance later that day. On the afternoon, a rowboat from Nymphe arrived with orders for Captain Pigot not to pass the fort. The flotilla was recalled by Admiral Cochrane.

On the morning of the 17th, Latour claims a less intense bombardment of the fort was commenced by the British at 10:00am. In the evening, the fort's mortar was ready, and it started a counter bombardment against the British bomb vessels. At some point one of the British bomb vessels was struck by an American mortar shell which put the boat out of action for five minutes. (There is nothing in British sources to support this assertion made by Latour.) In response, a more intense bombardment was continued into the night.

The mortar duel continued during the night of the January 17 and just before daylight on the 18th; several shells were lodged in Fort St. Philip's parapet; one burst passing through a ditch and into the center bastion. These were the last shots the fort received. At 6:00am the vessels headed south down the river. On the afternoon of January 22, the vessels had crossed the bar and had exited the Mississippi.

== Aftermath ==
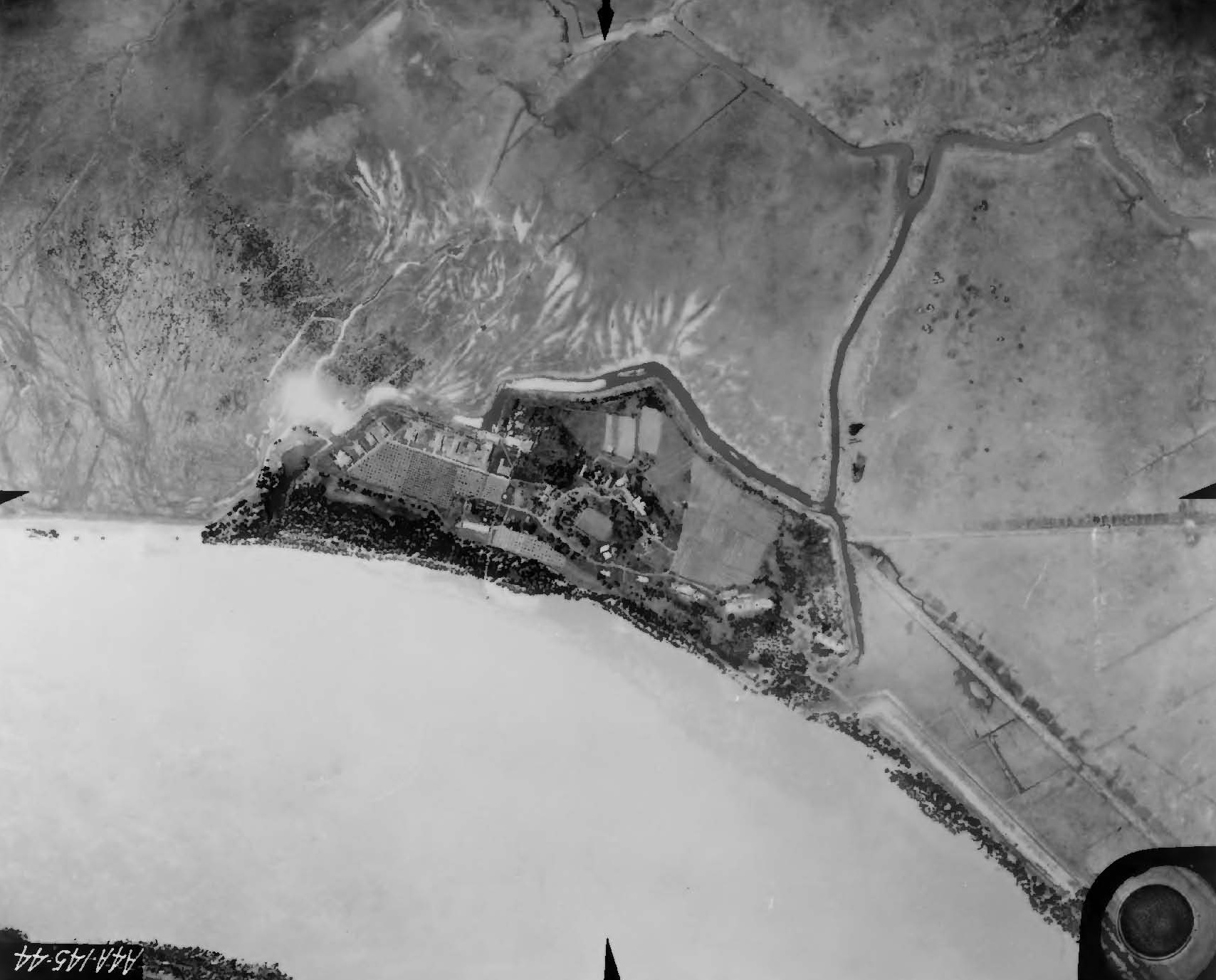
Fort St. Philip from the air in 1935.

In a despatch sent to the Secretary of War, dated January 19, Jackson states 'I am strengthened not only by [the defeat of the British at New Orleans]... but by the failure of his fleet to pass fort St. Philip.' Remini believes this was preventing the British moving their fleet up the Mississippi in support of the land attack. Roosevelt, as a naval historian, does not share Remini's theory. He observes that the British disengaged once the fort's mortar was resupplied and was able to return fire on January 17, the engagement being described as 'unsuccessfully bombarding' the fort by the British. The engagement is briefly mentioned in Roosevelt's naval history of the conflict and is dismissively summarized by one sentence.

The physical impossibility of Cochrane's fleet being able to overcome the bar at the mouth of the Mississippi does rule out the notion that the fleet could have sailed up the river. Most of these ships were in excess of 1,000 burthen tons, Cochrane's flagship HMS Tonnant being 2,281 tons, whereas the heaviest boat to have taken part in the engagement against the fort was 430 tons, being HMS Herald. For similar reasons, the Union attack on the fort in 1862 was made by schooner- and raft-mounted mortars that could negotiate the bar without beaching. The lack of any tangible sized amphibious landing does not support the idea the British wanted to capture the fort. The British were happy enough to be a 'diversion' by being moored out of the range of the fort's cannons, and by shelling the fort from a distance with mortars. Whilst the engagement appeared to have served no directly useful purpose to the British, it could be said it made a valuable contribution to the escape of Lambert's army elsewhere, to deter Jackson's forces from redeploying because of hostile forces at the fort, whose size and intention were unknown.

Overton claims that well over 1,000 British mortar shells were fired, estimated by Latour to be seventy tons of munitions. (Note: Roosevelt's observation. 'Latour is the only trustworthy American contemporary historian of this war, and even he at times absurdly exaggerates the British force and loss, Most of the other American "histories" of that period were the most preposterously bombastic works that ever saw print. But as regards this battle, none of them are as bad as even such British historians as Alison... Almost all British writers underestimate their own force and enormously magnify that of the Americans.') It has not been possible to corroborate that claim with daily expenditure from British sources, but the commanding officer of the Volcano has echoed Overton's comment. (Note: Quote from Dickson's journal: '27 January, 1815. Friday. Aboard HMS Royal Oak, at anchor off Chandeleur Island. Part of the ships arrived from the Mississippl. Captain Price, of the Volcano, called on board the Royal Oak to pay his respects to General Keane; he says they threw at least 1,000 shells at Fort Plaquemines, and apparently did them a good deal of damage, and killed and wounded men, and adds that there are about thirty guns mounted in the fort.') After the bombardment ended, the Americans discovered that over 100 enemy shells lay buried within the fort, unexploded. Nearly all of the buildings were in ruins and the ground for a half mile around the fort was littered with bomb craters.

Two American soldiers were killed and seven were wounded while sustaining severe damage to their fort. Neither the name of the commander, nor if the British had suffered casualties were recorded in contemporary sources, as the engagement was not considered significant enough for coverage. British historians have shown little interest in this engagement, with the exception of one pair of regimental historians in the 1920s. (Note: The Royal Marine Artillery was created with the express intention of mortars on bomb vessels being crewed by gunners under the control of the Royal Navy and not the British Army. When the definitive history of the Royal Marine Artillery was being written in the 1920s, this engagement was considered to be worthy of a mention as it was the last time in the conflict that exploding bomb shells were fired from a bomb vessel. Wishing to know more about the shell expenditure, they consulted the log of HMS Volcano, and this is quoted in the unit history. It is the only British eyewitness account to have been published in a printed book. Other than ship logs, there appear to be no other records.)

In addition to Jackson's despatch of January 19 mentioning the engagement, the part played by Acting Lieutenant (navy) Cunningham was mentioned in the despatch of Master Commandant Daniel Patterson to the Secretary of the Navy dated January 27. Three currently active Regular Army battalions (1-5 FA, 1-1 Inf and 2-1 Inf) perpetuate the lineages of two American units (Wollstonecraft's Company, Corps of Artillery, and the old 7th Infantry) that were present at Fort St. Philip during the bombardment.

The incomplete battery opposite the fort was replaced with a larger structure, Fort Jackson. This and Fort St Philip were besieged in the American Civil War.

== See also ==
- Jean Lafitte
- Capture of USS President
- Battle of Forts Jackson and St. Philip

== Notes and citations ==
Notes

Citations
