= HMS Calliope (1808) =

Brig-sloop of the Royal Navy

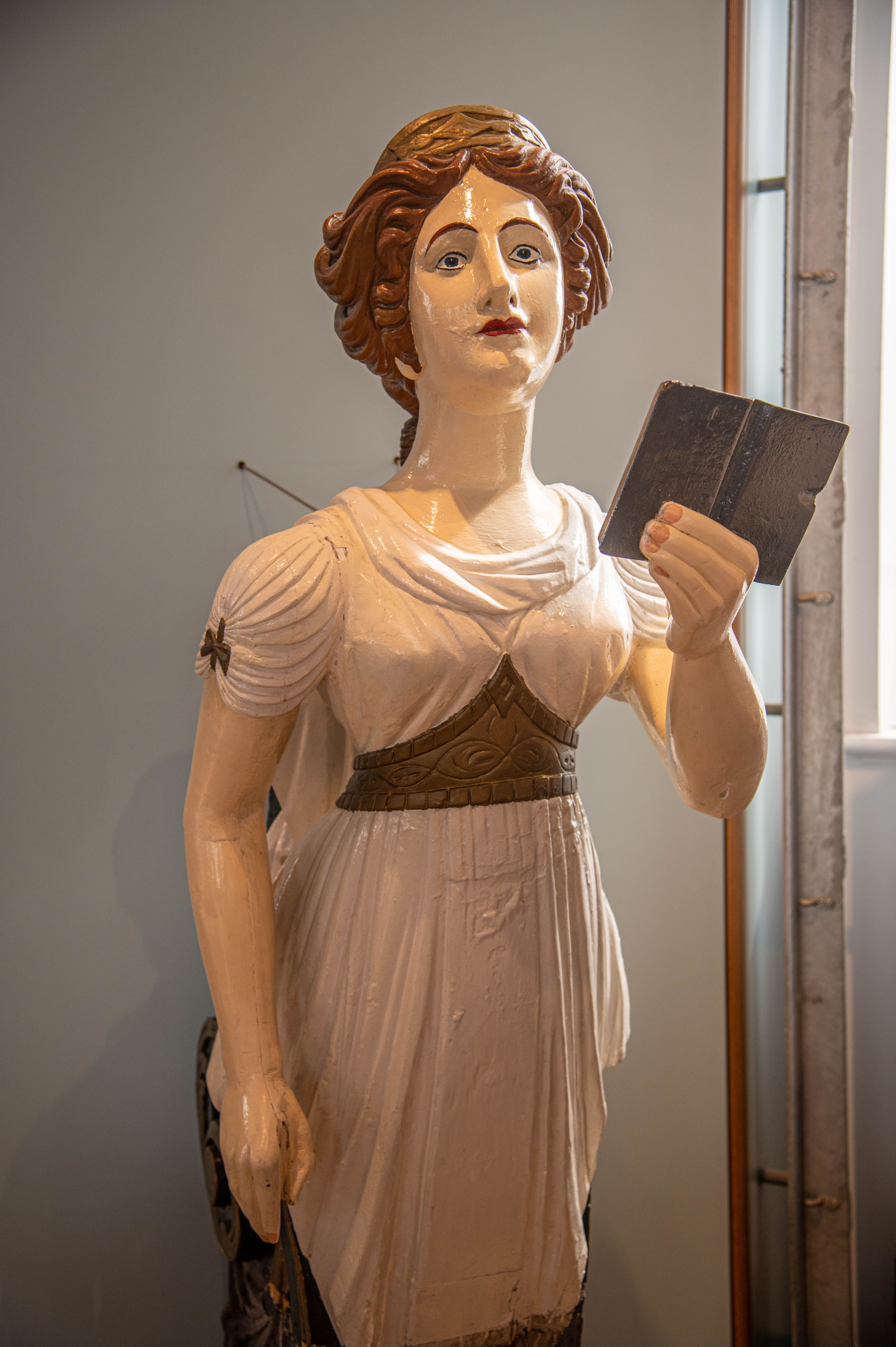
- Figurehead of HMS Calliope

History

United Kingdom
- Name: HMS Calliope
- Namesake: Calliope
- Ordered: 31 December 1807
- Builder: John Dudman & Co., Deptford
- Laid down: April 1808
- Launched: 8 July 1808
- Commissioned: September 1808
- Fate: Broken up 13 August 1829

General characteristics
- Class & type: Cherokee-class brig-sloop
- Tons burthen: 23614/94 (bm)
- Length: 90 ft 0 in (27.4 m) (gundeck); 73 ft 5 1/2 in (22.4 m) (gundeck)
- Beam: 24 ft 7 in (7.5 m)
- Draught: 9 ft 0 in (2.7 m) (laden); 6 ft 0 in (1.83 m) (unladen)
- Depth of hold: 11 ft 2 in (3.4 m)
- Sail plan: Brig
- Complement: 75
- Armament: 8 × 18-pounder carronades + 2 × 6-pounder guns

HMS Calliope was a Cherokee-class brig-sloop of the Royal Navy, launched in 1808. She operated primarily in the North Sea where she captured numerous small merchant vessels and one French privateer. She also was present at the battle of Lake Borgne, near New Orleans. She was broken up in 1829.

== Figurehead ==
The figurehead of HMS Calliope is based upon one of the nine muses in Greek mythology of the same name. The muses were the daughters of Zeus, goddesses of the arts and science; Calliope was the Muse of Epic Poetry.

The muses are generally represented in various art works as beautiful and modest virgins, with the figurehead is portrayed in a typical long, white tunic to echo that sentiment. Depictions of Calliope tend to feature the white tunic and/or a tablet and stylus or roll of parchment, as can be seen in notable works such as Charles Meynier's Calliope, muse de la poésie (late 18th to early 19th century) and the sculpture found in the Hall of the Muses at the Pio-Clementine Museum in the Vatican. This figurehead also shows Calliope holding a book of poetry in reference to the tablet.

The figurehead was removed from the ship when it was broken up at Portsmouth. Two other figureheads representing Calliope have also survived, one from the 1837–1883 6th Rate that was held within the Devonport collection, and the bow decoration from the 1884–1951 screw corvette that resides at the headquarters of the Royal Naval Reserve in Gateshead.

The trailboards for this figurehead have not survived but would have likely included other carvings that featured further decorate details related to Calliope and the muses.

=== The muses in popular culture ===
In 1997, Disney’s retelling of Hercules featured the muses scaled down to five women instead of nine. They remained goddesses of the arts and were portrayed as a Black gospel group who acted as narrators to move the story along, with several key numbers written by Alan Menken that boosted the characters’ popularity.

== Napoleonic Wars ==
Calliope was commissioned in September 1808 under Commander John M'Kerlie.

On 5 January 1809 Calliope was in company with Pigeon off Kingsgate Point near Margate. That evening the two vessels were off Flushing when a heavy gale and snowstorm parted them. Pigeon grounded and was lost, though almost her entire crew survived.

In August–September 1809 Calliope took part in the ill-fated Walcheren Campaign. In particular, she was at the capture of Flushing on 15 August.

Admiral Sir Richard Strachan then assigned Calliope to patrol off the north coast of Holland to Heligoland.

Calliope and Prospero shared in the proceeds of the capture on 7 March 1810 of the Danish vessels Aggershuns and Anna Mette Catharina. On 13 March Calliope captured the Danish vessels Ellen Sophia, Wagrein, and Hoffnung, and on 12 April Sprinkhorn, and Oppreissring. Calliope and Britomart shared in the proceeds of the capture on 2 September of the Danish vessels Goede Verwagting and Frou Esje.

On 25 October 1810 Calliope was at 54°47′N 2°46′E when she sighted an enemy vessel sailing towards her. The approaching enemy had apparently mistaken Calliope for a merchant brig; at the enemy came up to about three miles away, she realized her mistake, at which point M'Kerlie gave chase. Eventually Calliope caught up with her quarry and succeeded in bringing down her mainmast; with the loss of rigging and sails the quarry had to strike. The enemy vessel was the schooner Comtesse d'Hambourg, of eight 12-pounder carronades, six 8-pounder guns, and 51 men. She was seven days out of Dunkirk, but had not captured anything. M'Kerlie reported that Calliope had had three men wounded. Comtesse d'Hambourg had no casualties; her crew had fired her guns and then taken refuge below decks. (Note: Comtesse d'Hambourg was a privateer schooner that had been commissioned at Hamburg circa October 1810.)

On 12 March 1811 Calliope captured the Danish brig Silenus. On 9 September Callioppe captured the Dutch dogger Morgenstar.

On 23 May 1813 Calliope was in company with Urgent, Drake, Hearty, and the hired armed cutter Princess Augusta when they captured the Danish vessels Jonge Greenwoldt, Hoffnung 1 and 2, and another vessel, name unknown. (Note: The prize money for an ordinary seaman was 17s 9d.)

On 10 July 1813 Calliope was part of a squadron that captured eight small vessels in the Elbe and Weser. The squadron included Desiree, Brev Drageren, Shamrock, Thrasher, Princess Augusta, and gunboats. (Note: The prize money for an ordinary seaman for the eight small vessels was 15s 9 3/4d.) On 27 October Calliope was under the command of Commander John M'Kerlie, and in company with Thrasher. The shared in the proceeds of the capture on that day of Frou Magaretha. (Note: A first-class share of the prize money was worth £23 3s 6 1/2d; a sixth-class share of the prize money, that of an ordinary seaman, was worth 9s 1 1/2d.) Also on 27 October Calliope and Brevdrageren captured the Danish sloop Einzigheit. Between 10 July and 31 December 1813 the squadron of which Calliope was a part succeeded in capturing 19 vessels. (Note: A first-class share of the prize money was worth £80 10s 9d; a sixth-class share was worth £1 0s 6d.) Commander John Codd was appointed to Calliope on 6 December 1813, replacing M'Kerlie. Calliope remained on the North Sea station.

She arrived at Halifax on 16 September 1814. Under the rules of prize-money, she shared in the proceeds of the capture of the American vessels in the Battle of Lake Borgne on 14 December 1814. (Note: A first-class share of the prize money was worth £34 12s 9 1/4d; a sixth-class share, that of an ordinary seaman, was worth 7s 10 3/4d.) (Note: 'Notice is hereby given to the officers and companies of His Majesty's ships Aetna, Alceste, Anaconda, Armide, Asia, Bedford, Belle Poule, Borer, Bucephalus, Calliope, Carron, Cydnus, Dictator, Diomede, Dover, Fox, Gorgon, Herald, Hydra, Meteor, Norge, Nymphe, Pigmy, Ramillies, Royal Oak, Seahorse, Shelburne, Sophie, Thames, Thistle, Tonnant, Trave, Volcano, and Weser, that they will be paid their respective proportions of prize money.')

In April 1815 Commander Henry Thompson replaced Codd. (Calliope returned to Portsmouth on 17 August 1815.) Then in September 1815 Commander Alexander Maconochie replaced Thompson, but Calliope was laid up that month.

== Post-war ==
Calliope underwent repairs at Portsmouth between July and December 1820. Then between April and June 1822 Calliope underwent fitting to serve as a tender to HMS Apollo. In 1825 Calliope became a tender to HMY Royal George, and was under the command of Lieutenant John Powney. While captain of Calliope, he conveyed the Mexican chargé d'affaires, Senor Rocafuerte, with a treaty of commerce, from England to New Spain. The government of the republic rewarded Powney with a table service of plate. He brought home from thence a freight of considerable value, arriving back in England on 27 April 1827.

In spring 1827, Calliope was found unfit for further service. Lieutenant Powney was lent, with the crew of Royal George, to the Royal yacht Royal Sovereign. On 26 June 1827 Powney received a promotion to the rank of commander.

== Fate ==
Calliope was broken up at Portsmouth on 13 August 1829.
