= HMS Cydnus =

Frigate of the Royal Navy

History

United Kingdom
- Name: HMS Cydnus
- Ordered: 16 November 1812
- Builder: Wigram, Wells & Green, London
- Laid down: December 1812
- Launched: 17 April 1813
- Completed: By 30 June 1813
- Honours and awards: Naval General Service Medal with clasp "14 Dec Boat Service 1814"
- Fate: Broken up in February 1816

General characteristics
- Class & type: Cydnus-class fifth-rate
- Tons burthen: 1,07882/94 (bm)
- Length: 150 ft 1 1/2 in (45.8 m) (overall); 125 ft 2 3/8 in (38.2 m) (keel)
- Beam: 40 ft 3 in (12.3 m)
- Depth of hold: 12 ft (3.7 m)
- Sail plan: Full-rigged ship
- Complement: 315
- Armament: Upper deck: 28 × 18-pounder guns; QD: 14 × 32-pounder carronades; Fc: 2 × 9-pounder guns + 2 × 32-pounder carronades.

HMS Cydnus was one of eight Royal Navy 38-gun Cydnus-class fifth-rates. This frigate was built in 1813, at Blackwall Yard, London, and broken up in 1816.

== Design, construction and armament ==
The entire class was a version of the Leda-class frigates, but built of red fir (pine), which was cheaper and more abundant than oak. Most importantly, it permitted noticeably faster construction, but at a cost of reduced durability.

To enable the new frigate to meet the American frigates on less unequal terms, Cydnus, and her sister Eurotas received medium 24-pounders and an increased complement of men. Cydnus's 24-pounders were of a design by General Sir Thomas Blomefield, 1st Baronet and measured 7 ft. 6 in. in length while weighing about 40 cwt. The 24-pounders on Eurotas were to a design by Colonel Congreve.

During December 1813 and January 1814, Cydnus and Eurotas actually temporarily exchanged six 24-pounders, presumably to enable both vessels to test the designs against each other. Ultimately, the Royal Navy adopted General Blomefield's design.

== Service ==
Cydnus was commissioned in May 1813, under Captain Frederick W. Aylmer, but command passed later that month to Captain Frederick Langford. On 2 December, Briton captured Wolf's Cove, while Cydnus and a squadron were in company. (Note: The prize money for an ordinary seaman was 6s 11 1/4d.)

On 8 January 1814, Cydnus recaptured the English ship Rachael and Ann, of 14 guns, 226 tons, and 20 men. She had been sailing from Buenos Aires for London. (Note: The prize money for an ordinary seaman was 9s 9 3/4d.)

On 14 March 1814, Cydnus and Pomone captured the American privateer Bunker's Hill, of 14 guns and 86 men. Though Bunker's Hill had been known for her past successes, on this cruise she was eight days out of Morlaix without having captured anything. (Note: The prize money for an ordinary seaman was 16s 6 3/4d.) Bunker's Hill was the former Royal Navy cutter Linnet, which the French frigate Gloire had taken on 25 February 1813, near Madeira. Cydnus escorted a convoy bound for the East Indies in 1814.

Cydnus carried out convoy duties to the West Indies, departing Cork on 5 May 1814 with 100 vessels, and arriving on 25 June. Following its arrival in Jamaica, the Cydnus was employed cruising around the Windward Passage for the successive three months. As of 21 July, the Cydnus was in the Gulf of Gonâve. On 13 September Cydnus gave chase to an American privateer off the coast of Santo Domingo, but it escaped. In the aftermath of a privateer from Cartagena having captured a British schooner, and set the crew adrift in a canoe, the Cydnus departed Port Royal on a cruise to Cartagena, Colombia on 27 September 1814.

On 29 November 1814, the fleet departed Jamaica, one of the vessels being the Cydnus The fleet of British ships had anchored in the Gulf of Mexico to the east of Lake Pontchartrain and Lake Borgne by 14 December 1814, under the command of Admiral Sir Alexander Cochrane. Cydnus served in the Gulf coast operations against New Orleans in 1814. Her boats participated in the British victory at the Battle of Lake Borgne. On 8 December 1814, two US gunboats fired on Sophie, Armide, and the sixth-rate frigate Seahorse while the British were passing the chain of small islands that runs parallel to the shore between Mobile and Lake Borgne.

Between 12 and 15 December 1814, Captain Lockyer of Sophie led a flotilla of some 50 boats, barges, gigs, and launches to attack the US gunboats. Lockyer drew his flotilla from the fleet that was massing against New Orleans, including the 74-gun Third Rate Tonnant, Armide, Cydnus, Seahorse, Manly, and Meteor.

Lockyer deployed the boats in three divisions, of which he led one. Captain Montresor of the gun-brig Manly commanded the second, and Captain Roberts of Meteor commanded the third. After rowing for 36 hours, the British met the Americans at St. Joseph's Island. On 13 December 1814, the British attacked the one-gun schooner USS Sea Horse. On the morning of the 14th, the British engaged the Americans in a short, violent battle.

The British captured the entire American force, including the tender, USS Alligator, and five gunboats. The British lost 17 men killed and 77 wounded; Cydnus had four men wounded. Anaconda then evacuated the wounded. In 1821, the survivors of the flotilla shared in the distribution of head-money arising from the capture of the American gun-boats and sundry bales of cotton. (Note: A first-class share of the prize money was worth £34 12s 9 1/4d; a sixth-class share, that of an ordinary seaman, was worth 7s 10 3/4d.) In 1847, the Admiralty issued a clasp (or bar) marked "14 Dec. Boat Service 1814" to survivors of the boat service who claimed the clasp to the Naval General Service Medal. (Note: The 'Names of Ships for which Claims have been proved' are as follows: warships Tonnant, Norge, Royal Oak, Ramillies, Bedford, Armide, Cydnus, Trave, Seahorse, Sophie, and Meteor; troopships Gorgon, Diomede, Alceste, and Belle Poule.)

On 18 January 1815, Captain the Honourable William Henry Percy faced a court martial on board Cydnus, off Cat Island, Mississippi, for the loss of his vessel, Hermes, during his unsuccessful attack at the Battle of Fort Bowyer in September 1814. The court acquitted him of all blame, finding that the attack was justified.

In accordance with Cochrane's orders, Cydnus was moored off Prospect Bluff. Langford died on 17 February 1815 whilst in the Gulf of Mexico. Henry Montresor was appointed as interim commander from 26 February until Spencer joined. Sir Alexander Cochrane appointed Captain Robert Cavendish Spencer, of the sloop Carron, to command Cydnus on 19 April 1815, for his efforts in Louisiana and Florida. Spencer spent April camped at Prospect Bluff on the Apalachicola River, charged with settling Spanish claims for fugitive slaves to be returned, they being discharged from British service in the Corps of Colonial Marines. Lieutenant Colonel Edward Nicolls received orders to withdraw his troops from the fort at Prospect Bluff. (Note: Vice Admiral Cochrane wrote to Nicolls on February 14, and to Admiral Malcolm on February 17, stating 'when Peace is concluded you are to embark Major Nicolls...When the Garrison of Appalachicola is embarked, you will send the Vessels named in the margin [Cydnus, Herald, and Anaconda] to Jamaica, with directions for their following the orders of the senior officer there.') (Note: A letter from Spencer to Cochrane dated 17 February 1816, does mention that the Indian Chiefs were 'obeying Brevet Major Nicolls' orders until 22 April [1815]', whereupon Spencer sailed away.) Cydnus embarked the Royal Marine detachment on 22 April, moored at Pensacola on 27 April, then departed on 8 May. On 14 May, she was off the Dry Tortugas. She moored at Havana on 18 May then departed on 23 May, arriving at Bermuda on 13 June 1815, to allow the detachment to rejoin the 3rd Battalion as a supernumerary company. Cydnus next sailed to Halifax, arriving on 24 June 1815. Cydnus left the North America and West Indies Station and arrived in Portsmouth on 22 December 1815.

== Fate ==
Cydnus was paid off after she returned to England. The Napoleonic Wars had ended and as she was not durable, she was broken up at Portsmouth in February 1816.

Cydnus was among the ships and vessels under the command of-Admiral Lord Viscount Keith entitled to share in the Parliamentary grant for service in 1813 and 1814.
