= HMS Gorgon (1785) =

British Navy ship

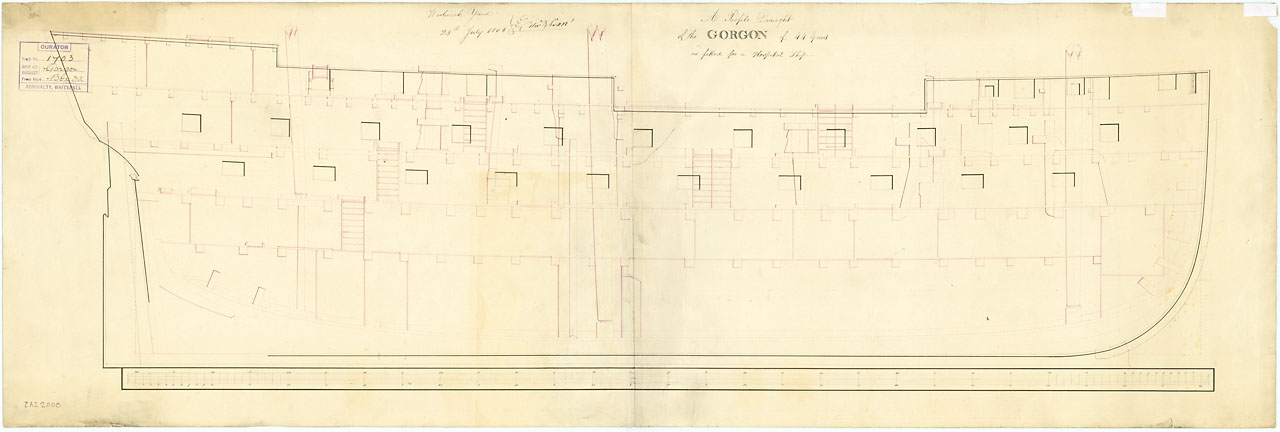
- Gorgon

History

Great Britain
- Name: HMS Gorgon
- Namesake: Gorgon
- Ordered: 19 June 1782
- Builder: Perry & Hankey, Blackwall Yard
- Laid down: December 1782
- Launched: 27 January 1785
- Completed: 15 December 1787 at Portsmouth Dockyard
- Honours and awards: Naval General Service Medal with clasp "Egypt"
- Fate: Broken up, February 1817

General characteristics
- Tons burthen: 896 54/94 tons bm (as designed)
- Length: 140 ft (43 m) (gundeck); 115 ft 2 1/2 in (35.12 m) (keel)
- Beam: 38 ft 3 in (11.66 m)
- Depth of hold: 16 ft 10 in (5.13 m)
- Sail plan: Full-rigged ship
- Complement: 300 (294 from 1794)
- Armament: Lower deck: 20 × 18-pounder guns; Upper deck: 22 × 12-pounder guns; Fc: 2 × 6-pounder guns

HMS Gorgon was a 44-gun fifth-rate two-decker ship of the Adventure class of 911 tons, launched at Blackwall Yard in 1785 and completed as a troopship. She was subsequently converted to a storeship. She also served as a guardship and a hospital ship at various times before being broken up in 1817.

== Troopship ==
Gorgon was fitted as a troopship at Portsmouth at a cost of £5,210, the work being completed on 15 December 1787. Lieutenant Charles Craven commissioned her in October 1787. She then was paid off one year later. One year after that, she was fitted for foreign service at an additional cost of £5,200 and recommissioned under Lieutenant William Harvey in October 1789.

== New South Wales ==
Under Commander John Parker (c1749–1794), she went to New South Wales on 15 March 1791, along with the Third Fleet, arriving on 21 September 1791. She carried six months provisions for 900 people in the starving colony. She also carried about 30 convicts, and Philip Gidley King, who was returning to the colony to take up the post of lieutenant-governor of Norfolk Island. This voyage is described in a 1795 book by Mary Ann Parker, who travelled with her husband, the ship's captain.

On 18 December 1791 Gorgon left Port Jackson, taking home the last company of the New South Wales Marine Corps, which had accompanied the First Fleet to guard the convicts and act as guard force for the new settlement. The marines leaving included Watkin Tench, Robert Ross, William Dawes, and Ralph Clark. Of the departure, Tench said, "we hailed it with rapture and exhilaration".

Gorgon also carried samples of animals, birds, and plants from New South Wales. At the Cape of Good Hope Gorgon took on board William Allen, Samuel Broom, Mary Bryant, her daughter Charlotte, Nathaniel Lillie, and James Martin, the survivors of a party of convicts who absconded from New South Wales in March 1791 and made it all the way to Kupang in West Timor. She also took on board ten of the mutineers from HMS Bounty that HMS Pandora had seized in Tahiti and who had survived the wreck of that vessel. During the voyage many of the children on board, including Charlotte Bryant, died of heat and illness. Gorgon arrived at Portsmouth on 18 June 1792, discharging her mixed passenger list of marines, escaped convicts, and mutineers.

== French Revolutionary Wars ==
Between March and July 1793 Gorgon was fitted as a 20-gun storeship at Woolwhich, for a cost of £5,709. She then was recommissioned under Commander Charles Patterson, who sailed her for the Mediterranean on 15 October 1793.

In February 1794 Gorgon was part of the fleet under Vice-Admiral Lord Samuel Hood at the taking of the Port of San Fiorenzo and Bastia, which eventually led to the capture of the island of Corsica by forces under Admiral Lord Nelson. Hood assigned Gorgon the task of protecting the convoy of transports carrying the troops and horses under the command of Lieutenant-General David Dundas.

At some point in 1794 Commander James Wallis replaced Patterson in command. However, in March 1795 Gorgon was paid off.

Commander Edward Tyrell recommissioned her in May 1795 and sailed her to the Mediterranean on 11 November 1795.

On 10 June 1796, Gorgon was in company with Courageaux and the hired armed cutter Fox. They were with the British fleet outside Toulon and were present when Southampton captured the French corvette Utile at Hyères Roads. Later that month Gorgon was at the evacuation of Leghorn.

In September 1796 Gilbert Elliot, the British viceroy of the Anglo-Corsican Kingdom, decided that it was necessary to clear out Capraja, which belonged to the Genoese and which served as a base for privateers. He sent Lord Nelson in Captain, together with Gorgon, Vanneau, the cutter Rose, and troops of the 51st Regiment of Foot to accomplish this task in September. On their way, Minerva joined them. The troops landed on 18 September and the island surrendered immediately.

In April 1797 Captain John W.T. Dixon took command. Captain John Williams replaced him in October 1797. Gorgon sailed for the Leeward Islands in January 1798.

On 13 January 1798 Gorgon was 70 leagues from Cape Finisterre when she caught up with and recaptured the brig Ann, of Dartmouth. Fifteen days earlier Ann had been sailing from Newfoundland to Lisbon when a French privateer had captured her. While Gorgon was exchanging people with the brig, another brig, this one exhibiting French colours, arrived. After Gorgon fired a few shots, the brig struck.

The newcomer turned out to be the French privateer Henri, from Nantes. She carried 14 guns, five of which she had thrown overboard. She also had a crew of 108 men. She had been cruising for five days but had taken nothing. Captain Richard Williams put a prize crew aboard and took her with him into Lisbon. The prize crew consisted mostly of men from Aigle, which had captured a prize and taken her to Lisbon.

Between 1799 and 1800 Gorgon continued to serve as a storeship under Commander Henry Hill. Then on 16 June 1801 Commander George Ross and Gorgon, together with Good Design, sailed from Cork. They were carrying the 22nd Regiment of Light dragoons to Egypt. Because Gorgon served in the Egyptian campaign (8 March to 8 September 1801), her officers and crew qualified for the clasp "Egypt" to the Naval General Service Medal that the Admiralty issued in 1847 to all surviving claimants.

== Napoleonic Wars ==
Commander William Wilkinson recommissioned Gorgon in May 1803 on the Irish station. In 1805, she served as a floating battery or guardship on the River Shannon. In October 1805 she was under Commander Francis Stanfell, with Commander Charles Ryder replacing him in May 1806.

Lloyd's List reported on 14 February 1806 that Rosina, M'Kinley, master, had foundered on her return journey to England from Surinam. Gorgon rescued the crew and took them into Milford.

Between November 1806 and July 1808 Gorgon was back in Woolwich, where she underwent a large repair and was fitted as a victualler. Commander Robert Brown Tom recommissioned her in May 1808 and sailed her to the Baltic where she again served as a storeship.

Even so, on 12 May 1809, she captured the Danish vessel Petrena. Then on 21 May she was in company with the gun-brig Strenuous when they captured the Danish boat Helden.

By November 1809 she was a hospital ship under Commander Charles Webb. Still, on 24 October 1810, Gorgon, Victory, Alonzo, and the gun-brig Martial were present at the capture of the brig Hoppet. (Note: The prize money for an ordinary seaman was 8s 2 1/4d; a captain received £51 3s 6d.)

Commander Alexander Milner had replaced Webb by April 1811. He sailed Gorgon to the Mediterranean on 10 March 1812. She came under the command of Commander Rowland Mainwaring in September. She then served as the flagship for Vice Admiral Francis Pickmore off Toulon. Commander Claude de Crespigny replaced Mainwaring at Port Mahon in 1813, but he died in July. Commander John Cornish replaced de Crespigny and in turn Commander Richard Booth Bowden replaced him in 1814.

== War of 1812 ==
Bowden then sailed Gorgon to America where she was Cochrane's British fleet's hospital ship, moored off the coast while the Battle of New Orleans was being fought on land. Before that battle her boats participated in the Battle of Lake Borgne on 14 December 1814. Gorgon had one master's mate slightly wounded. (Note: The prize money for an ordinary seaman was 7s 10 3/4d; the amount for a captain was £34 12s 9 1/4.) In 1847 the Admiralty authorized the issue of the Naval General Service Medal with clasp "14 Dec. Boat Service 1814" to all surviving claimants from the action. (Note: The 'Names of Ships for which Claims have been proved' are as follows: warships Tonnant, Norge, Royal Oak, Ramillies, Bedford, Armide, Cydnus, Trave, Seahorse, Sophie, and Meteor; troopships Gorgon, Diomede, Alceste, and Belle Poule.)

She left Bermuda on 7 April arrived in Portsmouth on 6 May 1815.

== Fate ==
Gorgon was finally broken up in 1817.
