= HMS Anaconda =

US privateer (1812–1813) and Royal Navy brig-sloop (1813–1815)

History

United States
- Name: Anaconda
- Builder: Middletown, Connecticut
- Launched: 1812
- Captured: Captured on 11 July 1813

United Kingdom
- Name: HMS Anaconda
- Acquired: Captured on 11 July 1813; Purchased in September 1813
- Fate: Sold on 5 May 1815

General characteristics
- Class & type: 18-gun brig-sloop
- Tons burthen: 38391/94 bm
- Length: 102 ft 6 in (31.2 m) (overall); 85 ft 10 in (26.2 m) (keel)
- Beam: 29 ft (8.8 m)
- Depth of hold: 10 ft 2 in (3.10 m)
- Complement: 120 men (privateer)
- Armament: 18 × 9 and 12-pounder guns (privateer); 18 × 9-pounder guns (Royal Navy)

HMS Anaconda was an 18-gun brig-sloop of the Royal Navy during the War of 1812. She was cruising as an American privateer until sailors from HMS Sceptre captured her in 1813. She served briefly in the Royal Navy during the later stages of the War of 1812, especially at the Battle of New Orleans, before being sold in Jamaica in 1815.

== American career ==
Anaconda was built in Middleton, Connecticut in 1812. In late 1812, Captain Nathanial Shaler took command of Anaconda in New York City.

On 16 January 1813, while Captain Shaler was ashore on business, Anaconda's first lieutenant, George W. Burbank, encountered the American schooner Commodore Hull and fired a broadside into her, seriously wounding her commander, before realizing his mistake. A court martial, however, absolved Burbank from blame.

On 14 May 1813, while in the latitude of the Cape Verde Islands, Burbank was able to capture the British packet ship Express Packet, an 8, 11, or 12-gun brig with a crew of 38, sailing from Rio de Janeiro to England. After a fight lasting over half-an-hour, Express struck. Shaler took out $75,000 in specie and then divested the packet after ransoming her for $8000.

U.S. sources reported that the bullion was worth $80,000. A later report stated that Express Packet had been armed with 12 guns and had had a crew of 38 men. She had engaged for 18 minutes before striking.

In June, Anaconda took the 8-gun brig Mary, sailing from Gibraltar. Later that month, Anaconda took the brig Harriet, sailing from Buenos Aires to London with a cargo of hides and tallow. Anaconda, delivered Harriet to New Bedford. Some records indicate that Harriet may have been armed with 12 guns, and that Shaler converted one of the brigs to a cartel. In all, his prizes were worth $250,000. However, in early July Captain Shaler took refuge in Ocracoke Inlet.

=== Capture ===
On 11 July 1813, Lieutenant George Westphal, First lieutenant of Sceptre, led a group of boats into Ocracoke Inlet during Rear-Admiral George Cockburn's amphibious attack on the port of Ocracoke, North Carolina. Their targets were Anaconda and a second privateer, the 13-gun schooner Atlas under Captain David Mafitt, as well as a revenue cutter. As the British boats approached, the Americans opened fire. Westphal's division, covered by rockets, (as directed by a Captain Russell and overseen by Lieutenant John Stevens) attacked and captured both privateers. However, the revenue cutter escaped up the Neuse to New Bern, where she gave warning of the British attack, permitting the preparation of defences that forestalled the Royal Navy from any further advance. Shaler escaped with his crew. Both privateers were condemned at Halifax and the British took them into service, Anaconda under her name, and Atlas as St Lawrence. Anaconda was sold in September for £3,879 2s 2d and commissioned under Westphal, her captor.

== British career ==
Anaconda refitted at Halifax and Westphal received a crew of 60 men, most of whom were the dregs of the fleet, offered by their captains when Admiral John Borlase Warren asked for drafts. Her first task was to escort a convoy of twelve merchant vessels from there to the West Indies. While doing so she fought off an attack by two large American privateers. One of the privateers surrendered after losing her jib-boom and fore-top-mast but escaped when Anaconda lost her own fore-top-mast chasing after the second privateer. Warren then transferred Anaconda to the Jamaica station.

In March 1814, Anaconda was stationed off the Mississippi Delta under the orders of Capt. Clement Milward of HMS Herald, and would remain here for the rest of the year. Arsene Latour mistakenly named Anaconda as the fourth vessel present during the Battle of Fort Bowyer, and this error has persisted. At the time of the battle, Anaconda's log places her in the Bay of Campeche.

The defeat at Fort Bowyer led the British to turn their attention to an attack on New Orleans. The Anaconda moored at Apalachicola, Florida to embark Edward Nicolls and an entourage of Indian chiefs on 7 December 1814, at the behest of Vice Admiral Sir Alexander Cochrane.

In the run-up to battle, Captain Nicholas Lockyer captured an American flotilla, consisting primarily of five gunboats, in the Battle of Lake Borgne. Anaconda did not contribute her boats and crew to the battle, but evacuated the 77 men who had been wounded there.

During Sir Alexander Cochrane's expedition against New Orleans in December, Westphal took Anaconda with great difficulty over shoals into Lake Borgne. Anaconda, gun-vessels and hired craft then moved the advance guard up the bayou in preparation for the New Orleans. Cochrane had ordered Westphal to lighten Anaconda and to get her into Lake Borgne. By forcing Anaconda over a bank five miles wide that was only eight feet under water, Westphal was able to get her into position 20 miles ahead of the other British warships where she could protect the boats bringing up supplies and troops. Captain Thomas Hardy of Ramillies wrote in a letter that Anaconda's protection surely saved many of the boats from capture by the Americans.

The Anaconda disembarked Edward Nicolls and an entourage of Indian chiefs on 27 December 1814. Westphal later landed with the greater part of Anaconda's crew, who then fought in the naval brigade under Captain Edward Troubridge. At the battle they helped man the batteries.

In accordance with Cochrane's orders, Anaconda moored off Prospect Bluff, In February 1815, Anaconda, and the schooner Shelburne (under Westphal's orders), cruised off the Florida coast north of Havana.

On 9 March 1815 the US privateer Kemp, Captain Joseph Almeda, captured the British merchantman Ottawa, James Simpson, master, which was off Cuba while sailing from Liverpool to Jamaica with porter, soap, potatoes, hams, cheese, etc. On 3 April Anaconda and Moselle, Captain George A. Westphal, recaptured Ottawa. The London merchant James Strachan Glennie protested the recapture, acting on behalf of Kemp and Joseph Almeda, arguing that the recapture had occurred during the period the Treaty of Ghent had established for restitution of captures. The Vice admiralty court of Jamaica found for Glennie.

== Fate ==
Anaconda was paid off in April 1815. She underwent a survey at Jamaica that found that she had sustained too much damage in the New Orleans campaign to merit retention in service. Anaconda was condemned and then sold on 5 May 1815. Westphal returned to Britain in July as a passenger aboard the Moselle.
