= List of shipwrecks in 1803 =

The list of shipwrecks in 1803 includes ships sunk, foundered, wrecked, grounded, or otherwise lost during 1803.

table of contents
1803
Jan	Feb	Mar	Apr
May	Jun	Jul	Aug
Sep	Oct	Nov	Dec
Unknown date

== January ==
=== 1 January ===
List of shipwrecks: 1 January 1803
Ship	State	Description
Baltimore	United States	The ship was in collision with Northumberland (United Kingdom) at Holyhead, Anglesey, United Kingdom and sank.
New Mary	United Kingdom	The brig was driven ashore and wrecked at Hauxley, Northumberland. She was on a voyage from Great Yarmouth, Norfolk to Leith, Lothian.
Sophie	France	The ship was lost near Île d'Yeu, Vendée. She was on a voyage from Morlaix, Finistère to Bordeaux, Gironde.

=== 2 January ===
List of shipwrecks: 2 January 1803
Ship	State	Description
Amphitrite	United States	The brig was driven ashore at Algeciras, Spain. She was later refloated and taken into Gibraltar for repairs.
Cora	United States	The full-rigged ship was driven ashore at the Montague Bastion, Gibraltar.
John	United Kingdom	The brig was driven ashore south of Algeciras. She was later refloated and taken into Gibraltar for repairs.
Le Volcan	France	The brig was driven ashore and wrecked at Shoreham-by-Sea, Sussex, United Kingdom. She was on a voyage from Dunkirk, Nord to New Orleans, French Louisiana.
Marimona	Morocco	The sloop was driven ashore at the back of the New Mole, Gibraltar.
Saba	United States	The schooner was driven ashore on the Neutral Ground, Gibraltar.
Santissima de la Salud	Spain	The ship was driven ashore on the New Mole, Gibraltar.
Unnamed	Spain	The polacca capsized off Europa Point, Gibraltar.

=== 4 January ===
List of shipwrecks: January 1803
Ship	State	Description
Robust	United Kingdom	The ship ran aground at the mouth of the Elbe. She was on a voyage from Port Glasgow, Renfrewshire to Hamburg. She was refloated and taken in to Hull, Yorkshire, where she arrived on 14 January.
Two Brothers	United Kingdom	The sloop foundered in the Bristol Channel. She was on a voyage from Llanelly, Glamorgan to Carmarthen.

=== 6 January ===
List of shipwrecks: 6 January 1803
Ship	State	Description
Hope	United Kingdom	The ship was wrecked near Dunbeath, Caithness with the loss of all but one of her crew. She was on a voyage from Sunderland, County Durham to Aberdeen.
Mary	United Kingdom	The ship was driven ashore and wrecked at Spurn Point, Yorkshire while on a voyage from Sunderland, County Durham to Plymouth, Devon.
Whydah	United Kingdom	The ship was wrecked on Martin's Industry Shoal, in the Atlantic Ocean 55 nautical miles (102 km) off Savannah, Georgia, United States.

=== 8 January ===
List of shipwrecks: 8 January 1803
Ship	State	Description
Neptune	United Kingdom	The ship was wrecked on Scroby Sands, Norfolk while on a voyage from Newcastle-upon-Tyne, Northumberland to London. Her crew were rescued. She subsequently came ashore at Winterton-on-Sea, Norfolk.
Unnamed	United Kingdom	A sloop ran aground at Leith, Lothian and was wrecked.

=== 9 January ===
List of shipwrecks: 9 January 1803
Ship	State	Description
Adriana	Batavian Republic	The ship ran aground in the North Sea off Whitstable, Kent, United Kingdom and was wrecked.
Betsey	United Kingdom	The ship departed from London for Leith, Lothian. No further trace, presumed foundered in the North Sea with the loss of all hands.
Ceres	United Kingdom	The sloop was driven ashore north of Whitby, Yorkshire. Her crew were rescued. She was later refloated.
Hope	United Kingdom	The ship was wrecked at Prior's Haven, Yorkshire.
John and Robert	United Kingdom	The ship was driven onto rocks at the mouth of the River Coquet and was wrecked. All fourteen crew survived.
Margaret	United Kingdom	The ship was lost near Porto, Portugal with the loss of three of her crew. She was on a voyage from the Canary Islands to London.
Meanwell	United Kingdom	The ship was driven ashore and wrecked at St. Andrews, Fife. She was on a voyage from Bordeaux, Gironde, France to Hull, Yorkshire and Newcastle upon Tyne, Northumberland.
Providence	United Kingdom	The ship foundered in the Irish Sea off the mouth of the River Duddon. Her crew were rescued.
Providence	United Kingdom	The ship was wrecked at Exmouth, Devon. She was on a voyage from London to Exeter, Devon.
Wear, or Were	United Kingdom	The ship was driven onto rocks off Coquet Island, Northumberland and was wrecked Her crew were rescued.. She was on a voyage from Cádiz, Spain to Sunderland, County Durham, or Hull and Leith.

=== 10 January ===
List of shipwrecks: 10 January 1803
Ship	State	Description
Active	United Kingdom	The West Indiaman was driven ashore and wrecked at Margate, Kent with the loss of ten of her nineteen crew. She was on a voyage from London to Greenock, Renfrewshire.
Anna Maria	France	The ship was driven ashore in the Bay of Gibraltar. Her crew survived. She was on a voyage from Cádiz, Spain to Antwerp, Deux-Nèthes.
Briton	United Kingdom	The full-rigged ship foundered in the Bay of Gibraltar. her crew were rescued. She was on a voyage from Newfoundland, British North America to Gibraltar.
Boa Ventura	Portugal	The ship was driven ashore in the Bay of Gibraltar. Her crew survived. She was on a voyage from Lisbon to Gibraltar.
Defiance	United Kingdom	The ship was wrecked at Peterhead, Aberdeenshire with the loss of two of her crew.
Dolphin	United States	The ship was driven ashore in the Bay of Gibraltar. Her crew survived. She was on a voyage from Boston, Massachusetts, to Gibraltar.
Drottingen	Swedish East India Company	The ship was lost 3 nautical miles (5.6 km) from Arundal, Norway. Her crew were rescued. She was on a voyage from Gothenburg to China.
Elias	Denmark–Norway	The ship was driven ashore at Cádiz.
Flying Fish	United Kingdom	The ship was driven ashore north of Whitby, Yorkshire. Her crew were rescued. She was later refloated.
Fortune	Ligurian Republic	The ship was driven ashore in the Bay of Gibraltar. Her crew survived. She was on a voyage from Genoa to Gibraltar.
Good Intent	United Kingdom	The ship was driven ashore north of Lowestoft, Suffolk with the loss of seven of her ten crew. She was on a voyage from Hartley, Northumberland to London.
Gratitude	United Kingdom	The ship was driven ashore in Firestone Bay, Devon. She was refloated.
Harmony	Spain	The brig foundered in the Bay of Gibraltar. Her crew survived.
Helena	United Kingdom	The ship was wrecked at Cádiz.
HMS Hussar	Royal Navy	The Amazon-class frigate caught fire off Blackstakes. The fire was extinguished.
Jason	United Kingdom	The ship was driven ashore at Cádiz.
Kilbury	United Kingdom	The ship was driven ashore in the Bay of Gibraltar. Her crew survived. She was on a voyage from Málaga, Spain to Liverpool, Lancashire. She was later refloated.
L'Achille	France	The ship was driven ashore in the Bay of Gibraltar. Her crew survived. She was on a voyage from Marseille, Bouches-du-Rhône to Mogadore, Morocco.
L'Amie Adelaide	France	The ship was driven ashore in the Bay of Gibraltar. Her crew survived. She was on a voyage from Cette, Hérault to Le Havre, Seine-Inférieure.
Maria	Ligurian Republic	The ship was driven ashore in the Bay of Gibraltar. Her crew survived. She was on a voyage from Genoa to Gibraltar.
Maria	Spain	The ship was driven ashore in the Bay of Gibraltar. Her crew survived. She was on a voyage from Cádiz to Montevideo, Viceroyalty of the Río de la Plata.
Maria	United States	The ship was driven ashore at Cádiz.
Nile	United Kingdom	The ship was driven ashore in the Bay of Gibraltar. Her crew survived. She was on a voyage from Vigo, Spain to Venice.
Nostra Señora de la Guadeloupe	Spain	The ship was driven ashore at Cádiz.
Nostra Señora del Carmen	Spain	The sloop foundered in the Bay of Gibraltar. Her crew survived.
Penelope	United Kingdom	The ship foundered off Figueira da Foz, Portugal. She was on a voyage from Bristol, Gloucestershire to Livorno, Grand Duchy of Tuscany.
Polly and Harriot	United Kingdom	The ship was wrecked at Cádiz.
Princessa	Spain	The ship was driven ashore between the mouth of the San Pedro and Gibraltar. Her crew survived.
HMS Snipe	Royal Navy	The gun-brig was driven ashore on the east Kent coast. She was refloated.
St. Jean	Spain	The ship was driven ashore at Cádiz.
Sydney Smith	United Kingdom	The ship was driven ashore at Corton, Suffolk. Her crew were rescued. She was later refloated and taken into Great Yarmouth, Norfolk.
Unity	United Kingdom	The ship was lost off Figueira da Foz.
William & Harry	United States	The ship was driven ashore at Cádiz.
Unnamed	Flag unknown	The ship was wrecked on the Goodwin Sands, Kent, having been previously abandoned by her crew.
Two unnamed vessels	Flags unknown	The ships were driven ashore at Deal, Kent. Their crews were rescued.

=== 11 January ===
List of shipwrecks: 11 January 1803
Ship	State	Description
Betsey	United Kingdom	The ship was wrecked near the Old Head of Kinsale, County Cork. She was on a voyage from Swansea, Glamorgan to Kinsale, County Cork.
Catherine	United Kingdom	The ship was driven ashore and wrecked at Winterton-on-Sea, Norfolk while on a voyage from Emden to London.
Dædalus	United Kingdom	The ship was wrecked at Dearness, Orkney Islands with the loss of four of her crew. She was on a voyage from Moss, Norway to London.
Grocer	United Kingdom	The ship was driven ashore at Hopton-on-Sea, Norfolk while on a voyage from Hull, Yorkshire to London. Her crew were rescued.
Hindostan	British East India Company	Hindostan. The East Indiaman was wrecked on the Wedge Sand, in the North Sea 12 nautical miles (22 km) off Margate, Kent with the loss of about 25 of the 120 people on board. Liberty and Lord Nelson (both United Kingdom) rescued 80 of the survivors between them.
Squirrel	United Kingdom	The ship was driven ashore north of Lowestoft, Suffolk with the loss of eleven of her fourteen crew. She was on a voyage from Newcastle-upon-Tyne to London.
Vrouw Margaretta	Batavian Republic	The ship was driven ashore and wrecked at Easington, Yorkshire, United Kingdom. She was on a voyage from Bordeaux, Gironde, France to Amsterdam, North Holland. Her crew were rescued.

=== 12 January ===
List of shipwrecks: 12 January 1803
Ship	State	Description
Aurora	Sweden	The brig was driven ashore and wrecked at Trieste.
De Sex Sockend	Flag unknown	The ship was driven ashore and wrecked at Trieste.
Hannah	United Kingdom	The ship was driven ashore at Trieste.
Providentia	Denmark–Norway	The brig was driven ashore and wrecked at Trieste.
Moder and Frie Soestre	Flag unknown	The ship was driven ashore and wrecked at Trieste.
Two Bettys	United States	The ship was lost at Trieste.
Wasao Wäll	Sweden	The ship was driven ashore at Caister-on-Sea, Norfolk, United Kingdom and was wrecked with the loss of three of her ten crew. She was on a voyage from Cádiz, Spain to Rotterdam, South Holland, Batavian Republic.
William	United Kingdom	The ship was driven ashore at Corton, Suffolk Her crew were rescued. She was on a voyage from Whitstable, Kent to Newcastle upon Tyne, Northumberland.
Unnamed	Batavian Republic	The hoy was driven ashore at Corton. Her crew were rescued.
Unnamed	Flag unknown	The ship was driven ashore at Corton. Her crew were rescued.

=== 17 January ===
List of shipwrecks: 17 January 1803
Ship	State	Description
Catharine	Prussia	The ship was driven ashore at Winterton-on-Sea, Norfolk, United Kingdom.
Hector	United States	The ship was driven ashore and wrecked at Flamborough Head, Yorkshire, United Kingdom with the loss of two of the nineteen people on board. She was on a voyage from New York to Hamburg.
Penguin	United Kingdom	The ship was wrecked at Kinsale, County Cork. Her crew were rescued.
Vrouw Margaretta	Batavian Republic	The ship was driven ashore at Easington, Yorkshire. Her crew were rescued. She was on a voyage from Bordeaux, Gironde, France to Amsterdam, North Holland.
Unnamed	Flag unknown	The ship was driven ashore and wrecked at Skipsea, Yorkshire.
Unnamed	Flag unknown	The wrecked ship was driven ashore at Aldbrough, Yorkshire. She floated off and drove out to sea.
Two unnamed vessels	Flags unknown	The ships were driven ashore on the Holderness coast, Yorkshire.
Unnamed vessels	Flags unknown	The ships were driven ashore at Flamborough Head, Yorkshire.

=== 13 January ===
List of shipwrecks: 13 January 1803
Ship	State	Description
Hilda	United Kingdom	The brig was damaged by fire at Whitby, Yorkshire.

=== 18 January ===
List of shipwrecks: 18 January 1803
Ship	State	Description
Unnamed	Flag unknown	The ship was wrecked on Inchcape, Fife, United Kingdom with the loss of at least two lives.

=== 19 January ===
List of shipwrecks: 19 January 1803
Ship	State	Description
Margaret	United Kingdom	The ship was lost near Bermuda. She was on a voyage from Virginia, United States to Barbados.
Sally & Polly	United Kingdom	The ship was driven ashore on "Suderae Island". Her crew were rescued. She was on a voyage from Saint Petersburg, Russia to Dysart, Fife.

=== 20 January ===
List of shipwrecks: 20 January 1803
Ship	State	Description
Favourite	United Kingdom	The ship was abandoned in the Atlantic Ocean. She was on a voyage from Saint Thomas, Virgin Islands to London.
Molly	United Kingdom	The ship was driven ashore and wrecked at Point Naga, Tenerife, Canary Islands. There was only one survivor of her passengers and crew. Molly was on a voyage from London to Jamaica.

=== 21 January ===
List of shipwrecks: 21 January 1803
Ship	State	Description
Centurion	United Kingdom	The brig was abandoned in the Atlantic Ocean (32°30′N 76°00′W) with the loss of six of her nine crew. Survivors were rescued by William and Henry (United Kingdom). Centurion was on a voyage from Wilmington, Delaware to St Augustine.
Unnamed	United Kingdom	The sloop was driven ashore and wrecked at Leith, Lothian. Her crew were rescued.

=== 25 January ===
List of shipwrecks: 25 January 1803
Ship	State	Description
Caroline	United Kingdom	The ship was wrecked in the Isles of Scilly. She was on a voyage from Limerick to Poole, Dorset.
Metta	Flag unknown	The galliot foundered in the North Sea off the coast of Scotland.
Speculation	United Kingdom	The brig foundered at Dublin with the loss of all hands. She was on a voyage from Liverpool, Lancashire to São Miguel Island, Azores, Portugal.
Unnamed	United Kingdom	The wreck of a ship came ashore at Belhelvie, Aberdeenshire. All hands had been lost.
Unnamed	United Kingdom	The ship was wrecked on the coast of Norway.

=== 26 January ===
List of shipwrecks: 26 January 1803
Ship	State	Description
Hope	United Kingdom	The ship was lost off Dún Laoghaire, County Dublin with the loss of six of her crew. She was on a voyage from Whitehaven, Cumberland to Dublin.
Wilhelmina	United States	The ship was wrecked on the coast of Wales. Her crew were rescued. She was on a voyage from Virginia to an Irish port.

=== 27 January ===
List of shipwrecks: 27 January 1803
Ship	State	Description
Columbia	United Kingdom	The ship ran aground on the South Bull, in the Irish Sea off County Dublin. She was on a voyage from Savannah, Georgia, United States to Liverpool, Lancashire. Columbia was later refloated and taken into Dún Laoghaire, County Dublin.

=== 28 January ===
List of shipwrecks: 27 January 1803
Ship	State	Description
Bonavista	United Kingdom	The ship was lost near Morlaix, Finistère, France with the loss of all but three of her crew. She was on a voyage from Newfoundland, British North America to Poole, Dorset.
Sincerity	United Kingdom	The ship was driven ashore at Dunfanaghy, County Donegal. Her crew were rescued. She was on a voyage from Limerick to Liverpool, Lancashire. Sincerity was later refloated.

=== 31 January ===
List of shipwrecks: 31 January 1803
Ship	State	Description
St. Nicholas	Spain	The ship was driven ashore near Algeciras. She was on a voyage from Málaga to Veracruz, Viceroyalty of New Granada.

=== Unknown date ===
List of shipwrecks: Unknown date in January 1803
Ship	State	Description
Abundance	United Kingdom	The stores ship was driven ashore near Newtown, Isle of Wight. She was on a voyage from Portsmouth, Hampshire to Gibraltar. She was later refloated.
Active	United Kingdom	The whaler was wrecked on the Island of Desolation, South Shetland Islands.
Ann	United Kingdom	The ship was lost near "Ivica". She was on a voyage from Livorno, Grand Duchy of Tuscany to Liverpool, Lancashire.
Anne	United Kingdom	The ship was lost at South Shields, County Durham.
Anna Augusta	United Kingdom	The ship, Smith, master, was lost off Brazil, south of Bahia. Her crew arrived at Bahia on 29 January.
Anne	United Kingdom	The ship was lost near South Shields.
Arno	United Kingdom	The ship was driven ashore near Dunstanburgh Castle, Northumberland.
Assiance	United Kingdom	The ship was lost near Peterhead with the loss of two of her crew. She was on a voyage from Bremen to Newcastle upon Tyne, Northumberland.
Batchelor	United Kingdom	The ship was driven ashore at Curracloe, County Wexford with the loss of two of her crew.
Betsey	United Kingdom	The ship was lost off Kinsale, County Cork.
Bolton	United Kingdom	The ship was driven ashore near Dublin.
Briton	United Kingdom	The ship sank at Cádiz, Spain.
Cantabria	Flag unknown	The ship foundered in the Atlantic Ocean off the Azores.
Catharine	United Kingdom	The ship was wrecked in Strangford Lough while on a voyage from Wexford to Liverpool.
Commerce	United Kingdom	The ship was driven ashore and wrecked at Peterhead, Aberdeenshire with the loss of all hands.
Dædalus	United Kingdom	The ship was wrecked at Deerness, Orkney Islands between 5 and 26 January with the loss of four of her eight rew.
De Jonge Calsbuck	Batavian Republic	The ship was driven ashore and wrecked at Margate, Kent, United Kingdom while on a voyage from Amsterdam, North Holland to Lisbon, Portugal.
Dorothy	United Kingdom	The ship was driven ashore in Dundalk Bay. She was on a voyage from London to Liverpool.
Dumfries	United Kingdom	The ship foundered between St Bees Head and Black Combe, Cumberland with the loss of all hands. She was on a voyage from Dumfries to Liverpool.
Earl St. Vincent	United Kingdom	The ship was wrecked at Cork.
Eliza & Mary	United Kingdom	The ship was lost near South Shields.
Elizabeth	Denmark–Norway	The brig was driven ashore and wrecked at Deal, Kent, United Kingdom. She was on a voyage from London to Lisbon, Portugal.
Elizabeth and Mary	United Kingdom	The ship was driven ashore near Dunstanburgh Castle, Northumberland.
Ellwood	United Kingdom	The ship was wrecked at Ramsey, Isle of Man with the loss of either her captain or all hands.
Endeavour	United Kingdom	The ship was wrecked in the Orkney Islands while on a voyage from Thurso, Caithness to Rotterdam.
Experiment	United Kingdom	The ship was lost near "Billagin", Ireland. Her crew were rescued.
Fanny	United Kingdom	The ship was driven ashore at Dublin and was severely damaged.
Fanny	United Kingdom	The ship was driven ashore at Drogheda, County Louth. She was on a voyage from Irvine, Ayrshire to an Irish port.
Favourite	United Kingdom	The ship put in to Peterhead, Aberdeenshire in a severely damaged condition. It was feared that she would be wrecked there.
Friendschaft	Batavian Republic	The ship was driven ashore and wrecked at Aldeburgh, Suffolk while on a voyage from Amsterdam to Rouen, Seine-Inférieure, France.
George	United Kingdom	The ship was lost in The Swin, off the coast of Essex.
George Frederick	Denmark–Norway	The ship was lost near Aldeburgh. She was on a voyage from Copenhagen to Saint Croix.
Good Intent	United Kingdom	The ship was driven ashore at Margate.
Hawke	United Kingdom	The sloop was abandoned by her crew off St. Govan's Head Pembrokeshire. She was on a voyage from London to Liverpool. She was subsequently taken in to Milford Haven, Pembrokeshire.
Hebe	United Kingdom	The ship was driven ashore and wrecked at Dundalk, County Louth. She was on a voyage from Bristol, Gloucestershire to Dublin.
Hero	United Kingdom	The ship was driven ashore at Baltimore, County Cork. She was on a voyage from Newfoundland, British North America to Waterford.
Hero	United Kingdom	The ship was wrecked at Lisbon, Portugal with the loss of all hands. She was on a voyage from Newfoundland to Lisbon.
Hope	United Kingdom	The ship was driven ashore at Great Yarmouth, Norfolk. She was later refloated and taken into Great Yarmouth.
Isabella	United Kingdom	The ship was lost near South Shields.
Isabella	United Kingdom	The ship was lost near Newcastle upon Tyne.
James	United Kingdom	The ship was wrecked near Arbroath, Forfarshire. Her crew were rescued.
Jong Jacob	Batavian Republic	The ship was driven ashore at Lowestoft, Suffolk, United Kingdom. She was on a voyage from Amsterdam to London.
Jong Hendrik	Batavian Republic	The ship was driven ashore on the Barbary Coast. She was on a voyage from Spain to Amsterdam.
L'Amazon	France	The ship was wrecked near Dartmouth, Devon, United Kingdom. Her crew were rescued. She was on a voyage from Saint-Domingue to Le Havre, Seine-Inférieure.
Lark	United Kingdom	The whaler was lost in the River Shannon. Her crew were rescued.
London	United Kingdom	The ship an aground on the Maplin Sand, in the North Sea off the coast of Essex. She was on a voyage from London to South Shields.
London Packet	United Kingdom	The ship was driven ashore and severely damaged at Poole, Dorset. She was on a voyage from London to Lyme, Dorset. London Packet was later refloated.
Lovely Cruizer	United Kingdom	The ship was wrecked in Lough Swilly while on a voyage from Limerick to Greenock, Renfrewshire.
Mapaphema	Russian Empire	The ship foundered in the North Sea off Peterhead. She came ashore at Cairnbulg, Aberdeenshire.
Mary	United Kingdom	Captain Dawson's ship was driven ashore at Drogheda with the loss of a crew member.
Mary	United Kingdom	Captain Wheatley's ship was driven ashore at Dimany Point, near Drogheda.
Mary	United Kingdom	The ship foundered in the Boston Deeps, in the North Sea between 15 and 22 January with the loss of four of her ten crew. She was on a voyage from Greenock, Renfrewshire to London.
Nancy	United Kingdom	The ship was wrecked on Old Law Point, Northumberland with the loss of four of her five crew. She was on a voyage from Sunderland, County Durham to Dundee, Forfarshire.
Œconomy	United Kingdom	The ship was wrecked on the Shipwash Sands, in the North Sea off the coast of County Durham. Her crew were rescued. She was on a voyage from South Shields, County Durham to London.
Orwell	United Kingdom	The ship was driven ashore and wrecked at Great Yarmouth while on a voyage from Ipswich, Suffolk to Leith, Lothian. Her crew were rescued. She was later refloated and taken into Great Yarmouth.
Onderneeming	Denmark–Norway	The brig was driven ashore and wrecked at Margate. Her crew were rescued. She was on a voyage from Rotterdam, South Holland, Batavian Republic to Marseille, Bouches-du-Rhône, France.
Patroclus	United Kingdom	The ship was driven ashore near Elsinore, Denmark. She was on a voyage from Libava, Courland Governorate to Hull, Yorkshire. She was later refloated.
Peggy	United Kingdom	The sloop was wrecked in the Orkney Islands.
Primrose	United Kingdom	The ship was wrecked on Texel, North Holland, Batavian Republic while on a voyage from London to Hamburg.
Providence	United Kingdom	The ship was lost with all hands. She was on a voyage from Whitehaven, Cumberland to Dublin.
Providence	United Kingdom	The ship was lost whilst on a voyage from Liverpool to Limerick.
Ratification	United Kingdom	The ship was lost near Weymouth, Dorset. She was on a voyage from Cancale, Ille-et-Vilaine, France to London.
Reliance	United Kingdom	The ship was driven ashore and wrecked near Cartagena, Spain. She was on a voyage from London to a Spanish port.
Resolution	United Kingdom	The ship departed from Newfoundland. No further trace, presumed foundered with the loss of all hands.
Resource	United Kingdom	The ship ran aground on Scharhörn. She was refloated and taken in to Hull, Yorkshire.
Río Novo	Spain	The ship was wrecked at Penzance, Cornwall, United Kingdom with the loss of three of her crew. She was on a voyage from Valencia to London.
Ruby	United Kingdom	The ship was driven ashore north of Newcastle upon Tyne.
Sarah	United Kingdom	The ship was driven ashore near Alnmouth, Northumberland. She was on a voyage from Great Yarmouth to Leith. The wreck was looted by the local inhabitants.
Salisbury	United Kingdom	The ship was driven ashore and severely damaged at Wexford.
Shellelagh	United Kingdom	The ship was wrecked on the Irish coast with the loss of all hands. She was on a voyage from Belfast, County Down to London.
Sidney Smith	United Kingdom	The ship was driven ashore near Great Yarmouth. Her crew were rescued. She was on a voyage from London to Hull.
Speculation	Denmark–Norway	The ship was lost near Lisbon with the loss of all but six of her crew. She was on a voyage from Saint Croix to Copenhagen.
Sukey	United Kingdom	The schooner was wrecked at sea. All but two of her crew were rescued by Speedy (United Kingdom), the others refused to leave the vessel.
Tay	United Kingdom	The ship sprang a leak and put into Londonderry, where she sank. She was on a voyage from Sligo to Greenock.
Three Sisters	United Kingdom	The ship was driven ashore near Penzance. Her crew were rescued. She was on a voyage from Plymouth, Devon to Tenby, Pembrokeshire. She was later refloated and taken into Penzance.
Union	United Kingdom	The ship was driven ashore near Poole. She was on a voyage from London to Lyme. Union was later refloated.
Urania	Sweden	The ship was wrecked on the French coast while on a voyage from St. Ubes, Spain to Gothenburg.
Vrouw Ida	Batavian Republic	The ship was wrecked in the Orkney Islands.
William	United Kingdom	The ship was driven ashore north of Newcastle upon Tyne.
William	United Kingdom	The ship was driven ashore near Great Yarmouth. Her crew were rescued. She was on a voyage from Whitstable, Kent to Sunderland, County Durham.
William and Mary	United Kingdom	The ship was driven ashore at Curracloe with some loss of life. She was on a voyage from Dublin to Wexford.
Unnamed	United Kingdom	The ship was wrecked near Saint-Vaast-la-Hogue, Morbihan, France with the loss of nine of her 30 crew.
Unnamed	Flag unknown	The ship was wrecked on Wartholm, off Westray, Orkney Islands between 5 and 26 January with the loss of at least two lives.
Unnamed	Flag unknown	The galliot was wrecked on Sanday, Orkney Islands between 5 and 26 January with the loss of all hands.
Unnamed	United Kingdom	The sloop was wrecked on Sanday between 5 and 26 January. Her crew were rescued.
Unnamed	Flag unknown	The wrecked brig was driven ashore at Deerness between 5 and 26 January.
Unnamed	Flag unknown	The ship was driven ashore on South Ronaldsay, Orkney Islands between 5 and 26 January with the loss of all hands.
Unnamed	United Kingdom	The fishing smack was lost in the Pentland Firth between 5 and 26 January.
Unnamed	Flag unknown	The crewless brig was driven ashore on Stronsay, Orkney Islands.

== February ==
=== 1 February ===
List of shipwrecks: 2 February 1803
Ship	State	Description
Goede Verwagting	Batavian Republic	The ship was wrecked with the loss of all but eight of her crew. She was on a voyage from Zierikzee, Zeeland to Dutch Guinea.

=== 2 February ===
List of shipwrecks: 2 February 1803
Ship	State	Description
Harmony	United Kingdom	The ship foundered off Cape Clear Island, County Cork with the loss of at least four of her crew. She was on a voyage from Limerick to London.

=== 4 February ===
List of shipwrecks: 4 February 1803
Ship	State	Description
Conquerant	France	The ship was lost near Quillebeuf-sur-Seine, Eure. She was on a voyage from Lisbon, Portugal to Rouen, Seine-Inférieure.
Suir	United Kingdom	The ship was driven ashore and wrecked 4 nautical miles (7.4 km) west of Rye, Sussex. She was on a voyage from Waterford to London.

=== 11 February ===
List of shipwrecks: 11 February 1803
Ship	State	Description
Active	United Kingdom	The ship was destroyed by fire at Dublin.
Jane	United Kingdom	The ship was destroyed by fire at Dublin.

=== 13 February ===
List of shipwrecks: 13 February 1803
Ship	State	Description
Tom	United States	The ship was wrecked on the Goodwin Sands, Kent, United Kingdom while on a voyage from Philadelphia, Pennsylvania, to Hamburg. Her crew survived.

=== 16 February ===
List of shipwrecks: 16 February 1803
Ship	State	Description
America	United States	The ship was driven ashore on the Half Mile Rocks. She was on a voyage from Liverpool, Lancashire, United Kingdom to Savannah, Georgia.
Ellwood	United Kingdom	The ship was wrecked near Ramsey, Isle of Man with the loss of four of her eight crew.
Orange Grove	United Kingdom	The ship was driven ashore on the Half Mile Rocks. She was on a voyage from Liverpool to Africa.
Rachael	United Kingdom	The ship ran aground and was wrecked on the Parade Bank, in Liverpool Bay. She was on a voyage from Cádiz, Spain to Liverpool.
Reunion	United Kingdom	The ship ran aground on the Pluckington Bank, in Liverpool Bay. She was on a voyage from Liverpool to Virginia, United States. She was later refloated.

=== 17 February ===
List of shipwrecks: 17 February 1803
Ship	State	Description
Trio	United Kingdom	The ship was wrecked on Islay. She was on a voyage from Lisbon, Portugal to Liverpool, Lancashire.

=== 19 February ===
List of shipwrecks: 19 February 1803
Ship	State	Description
Fishburn	United Kingdom	The ship was wrecked on the coast of British Honduras. She was on a voyage from British Honduras to London.
King George	United Kingdom	The ship struck a rock off Newry, County Antrim and was severely damaged. She was on a voyage from Dublin to Newry.
Trelawney	United Kingdom	The ship was wrecked at Ravenglass, Cumberland while on a voyage from Baltimore, Maryland, United States to Liverpool, Lancashire. Five lives were lost.

=== 21 February ===
List of shipwrecks: 21 February 1803
Ship	State	Description
Union	France	The ship was wrecked on the Île d'Yeu, Vendée. She was on a voyage from Bordeaux, Gironde to Rouen, Seine-Inférieure.

=== 23 February ===
List of shipwrecks: 23 February 1803
Ship	State	Description
Union	United Kingdom	The ship was lost at Ballywater, County Wexford.

=== 25 February ===
List of shipwrecks: 25 February 1803
Ship	State	Description
Fame	United Kingdom	The ship was driven ashore near Wexford.
Governor Picton	United Kingdom	The ship was driven ashore and wrecked near Greenock, Renfrewshire. She was on a voyage from the Clyde to Trinidad.

=== 26 February ===
List of shipwrecks: 26 February 1803
Ship	State	Description
Fame	United Kingdom	The ship was driven ashore at Wexford.
La Mère de Quatre	France	The ship was lost at the mouth of the Scheldt.
Mayflower	United Kingdom	The ship foundered in the Irish Sea off Dalkey, County Dublin. Her crew were rescued.

=== 27 February ===
List of shipwrecks: 27 February 1803
Ship	State	Description
Ann	United Kingdom	The ship was wrecked at Alnmouth, Northumberland.
Betty	United Kingdom	The ship was driven ashore near Kirkcudbright. She was on a voyage from Cork to Belfast, County Antrim and Greenock, Renfrewshire.
Governor Picton	United Kingdom	The ship was driven ashore south of Greenock. She was on a voyage from Greenock to Trinidad.
Hampden	United Kingdom	The ship was driven ashore near Hull, Yorkshire. She was on a voyage from Newcastle upon Tyne, Northumberland to Grenada.
Liberty	United Kingdom	The ship was wrecked on the Welsh coast. Her crew were rescued.
Perseus	United Kingdom	The ship was driven ashore at Maughold Head, Isle of Man. She was on a voyage from Greenock to Livorno, Grand Duchy of Tuscany.
Unnamed	United Kingdom	The brig was driven ashore near the Hill of Ardmore, Dunbartonshire. She was on a voyae from a Mediterranean port to Greenock.

=== 28 February ===
List of shipwrecks: 28 February 1803
Ship	State	Description
Jason	United Kingdom	The ship sprang a leak and was abandoned in the North Sea. Her crew were rescued. She was on a voyage from King's Lynn, Norfolk to Grangemouth, Stirlingshire.

=== Unknown date ===
List of shipwrecks: Unknown date in February 1803
Ship	State	Description
Blagonamaeremaos	Portugal	The ship was lost near Figueira da Foz. She was on a voyage from Saint Petersburg, Russia to Lisbon.
Cecilia	France	The ship was lost off Brest, Finistère. Her crew were rescued.
Commerce	United Kingdom	The ship was driven ashore on Gigha. She was on a voyage from New York to the Clyde.
Dalrymple	United Kingdom	The ship was wrecked on Barra, Outer Hebrides with the loss of all hands. She was on a voyage from Quebec to the Clyde.
Elizabeth & Ann	United Kingdom	The ship is presumed to have foundered whilst on a voyage from Liverpool, Lancashire to Cork.
Enterprize	United Kingdom	The ship was lost near Donaghadee, County Antrim with the loss of eleven of her crew. She was on a voyage from Havana, Cuba to Liverpool.
Friends Industry	United Kingdom	The ship is presumed to have foundered whilst on a voyage from Great Yarmouth, Norfolk to Liverpool.
Good Intent	United Kingdom	The ship was wrecked near Aberdeen with the loss of all hands. She was on a voyage from Newcastle upon Tyne, Northumberland to Aberdeen.
Helden	Batavian Republic	The East Indiaman capsized in the Indian Ocean. She was on a voyage from the Cape of Good Hope to Batavia, Dutch East Indies.
Izabellinha	Portugal	The ship was abandoned off the coast of Ireland. She was on a voyage from St. Ubes to Cork.
Josephine	France	The ship was lost off "Cape Lizard". She was on a voyage from Rouen, Seine-Inférieure to Bordeaux, Gironde.
King George	United Kingdom	The ship was wrecked on the West Hoyle Bank, in Liverpool Bay. She was on a voyage from Havana to Liverpool.
Lion D'Or	France	The ship was driven ashore near Dunkirk, Nord. She was on a voyage from Dunkirk to Tobago.
Mary	United Kingdom	The ship was driven ashore and severely damaged on the Isle of Wight. She was on a voyage from Falmouth, Cornwall to Hamburg. Mary was later refloated and taken into Cowes, Isle of Wight.
Montezuma	United Kingdom	The ship was wrecked at the Salt Pans, Ayr. She was on a voyage from Charleston, South Carolina to the Clyde.
Nautilus	United Kingdom	The ship sank at Whitby, Yorkshire. She was on a voyage from King's Lynn to Grangemouth, Stirlingshire.
Robert & Sally	United Kingdom	The ship was driven ashore west of Dover, Kent. She was on a voyage from Chester, Cheshire to Newcastle upon Tyne.
Santo Christo	Spain	The ship was lost near Gibraltar. She was on a voyage from Veracruz, Viceroyalty of New Granada to Málaga
Satisfaction	United Kingdom	The ship ran aground at South Shields, County Durham. She was on a voyage from Gosport, Hampshire to South Shields.
São Pedro de Alcântara	Portugal	The ship was wrecked on the Portuguese coast. She was on a voyage from Brazil to Lisbon.
Supply	United Kingdom	The ship was wrecked on the Brake Sand, in the North Sea off the coast of Kent. There were two survivors. She was on a voyage from South Shields to Arundel, Sussex.
Swift	United Kingdom	The ship was wrecked on the coast of Sicily. Her crew were rescued. She was on a voyage from Livorno, Grand Duchy of Tuscany to London.
William	United States	The ship was driven ashore and wrecked at Cape Espichel, Portugal. She was on a voyage from Baltimore, Maryland to Lisbon.
Young Frederick	Denmark–Norway	The ship was driven ashore and wrecked at Leiston, Suffolk, United Kingdom.
11 unnamed vessels	Flags unknown	The ships were wrecked off Cape Hatteras, North Carolina, United States due to the lighthouse not being lit.

== March ==
=== 3 March ===
List of shipwrecks: 3 March 1803
Ship	State	Description
Janeissary	United Kingdom	The ship foundered in the Mediterranean Sea off "Cape Brale". She was on a voyage from Constantinople. Ottoman Empire to Alexandria, Egypt.

=== 5 March ===
List of shipwrecks: 5 March 1803
Ship	State	Description
Unnamed	United Kingdom	The fishing coble foundered off the coast of Yorkshire with the loss of all hands.

=== 6 March ===
List of shipwrecks: 6 March 1803
Ship	State	Description
Iris	United Kingdom	The ship was driven ashore in the Clyde at Ardarden, Dunbartonshire.

=== 7 March ===
List of shipwrecks: 7 March 1803
Ship	State	Description
George	United Kingdom	The ship sprang a leak in the Atlantic Ocean and was beached on Porto Santo Island, Madeira. She was on a voyage from Lisbon, Portugal to Greenock, Renfrewshire.

== =11 March ==
List of shipwrecks: 11 March 1803
Ship	State	Description
Hopewell	United Kingdom	The ship ran aground on the Herd Sand, in the North Sea off the coast of County Durham. She was refloated on 13 March.

=== 14 March ===
List of shipwrecks: 14 March 1803
Ship	State	Description
Maria	United Kingdom	The ship was driven ashore and wrecked at Plouguerneau, Finistère, France with the loss of one of her ten crew. She was on a voyage from Hull, Yorkshire to Lisbon, Portugal.

=== 16 March ===
List of shipwrecks: 16 March 1803
Ship	State	Description
La Marie de Grâce	France	The ship was lost near the Île de Batz, Finistère. she was on a voyage from Le Havre, Seine-Inférieure to Brest, Finistère.

=== 19 March ===
List of shipwrecks: 19 March 1803
Ship	State	Description
Lucy	United Kingdom	The ship was driven ashore near Dumfries with the loss of a crew member. She was on a voyage from Charleston, South Carolina to Belfast, County Antrim.
Welcome Messenger	United Kingdom	The ship was run down and sunk in the North Sea off Lowestoft, Suffolk by Paragon (United Kingdom), Her crew were rescued. Welcome Messenger was on a voyage from Newcastle upon Tyne, Northumberland to London.
Unnamed	United Kingdom	The brig capsized and sank in the North Sea off Dunbar, Lothian with the loss of all hands.

=== 21 March ===
List of shipwrecks: 21 March 1803
Ship	State	Description
Margaret	(United Kingdom of Great Britain and Ireland) New South Wales	The ship was wrecked on a reef in the Pacific Ocean (15°27′S 123°45′E). Her twelve crew survived.

=== 23 March ===
List of shipwrecks: 23 March 1803
Ship	State	Description
Eliza	United Kingdom	The ship was lost in Vineyard Sound. She was on a voyage from New York, United States to Belfast, County Antrim.

=== 26 March ===
List of shipwrecks: 26 March 1803
Ship	State	Description
HMS Determinee	Royal Navy	The sixth-rate frigate stuck a sunken rock broadside near Noirmont Point on the western side of St. Aubin Bay, Jersey, Channel Islands, where she was immediately bilged and started taking in water. Seventeen were lost including men, women, and children from the 81st Regiment of Foot (Loyal Lincoln Volunteers)

=== 27 March ===
List of shipwrecks: 27 March 1803
Ship	State	Description
Canada	United Kingdom	The ship was lost in the Bay of Felca. She was on a voyage from Spain to London.

=== Unknown date ===
List of shipwrecks: Unknown date in March 1803
Ship	State	Description
Alert	(United Kingdom of Great Britain and Ireland) Guernsey	The ship was driven ashore on the Spanish coast. She was on a voyage from Spain to Guernsey.
Amphitrite	Denmark–Norway	The ship was driven ashore and wrecked at Pakefield, Suffolk, United Kingdom with the loss of two of her crew. She was on a voyage from Stavanger to St Martins.
Astrea	United Kingdom	The ship was driven ashore at Hoylake, Cheshire. She was on a voyage from Livorno, Grand Duchy of Tuscany to Liverpool, Lancashire.
Bacchus	United Kingdom	The brig was driven ashore near Land's End, Cornwall. She was later refloated and taken into Penzance.
Claude	United Kingdom	The ship was driven ashore and wrecked at Dover, Kent.
Defiance	United Kingdom	The ship was lost off Land's End. She was on a voyage from Penzance, Cornwall to Swansea, Glamorgan.
Fair American	United States	The ship was driven ashore near Londonderry, United Kingdom. She was on a voyage from Philadelphia, Pennsylvania, to Londonderry.
Flora	United Kingdom	The ship was driven ashore at Fishguard, Pembrokeshire. She was on a voyage from Barnstaple, Devon to Liverpool.
George	United Kingdom	The ship was driven ashore and wrecked near Bristol, Gloucestershire. She was on a voyage from Gallipoli, Ottoman Empire to Bristol.
Goodintent	United Kingdom	The ship was driven ashore at Deal, Kent. She was on a voyage from London to Sandwich, Kent.
Harlequin	United Kingdom	The ship was driven ashore on Heligoland. She was on a voyage from Hull, Yorkshire to Hamburg. Harlequin was later refloated and taken into Hamburg.
Hellen	United Kingdom	The ship was lost on the Isle of Lewis, Outer Hebrides. She was on a voyage from Liverpool to Rotterdam, South Holland, Batavian Republic.
Hibernia	United Kingdom	The ship was driven ashore and severely damaged near Liverpool. She was on a voyage from Barbados to Liverpool.
Hope	United Kingdom	The ship was driven ashore and wrecked near Poole, Dorset. She was on a voyage from Poole to London.
Hopewell	United Kingdom	The ship was wrecked on the Herd Sand, in the North Sea off the coast of County Durham. She was on a voyage from South Shields, County Durham to London.
Laurel	United Kingdom	The ship was driven ashore and wrecked at Holyhead, Anglesey. She was on a voyage from Cork to Liverpool.
L'Eclair	France	The ship was driven ashore at Les Sables-d'Olonne, Vendée. She was on a voyage from Marans, Charente-Maritime to Nantes, Loire-Inférieure
Le Rochfort	France	The ship foundered off Ouessant, Finistère.
Mary	United Kingdom	The ship was lost near Brest, Finistère with the loss of a crew member. She was on a voyage from Hull to Lisbon, Portugal.
Minerva	United Kingdom	The ship was driven ashore in Irvine Bay. She was on a voyage from Charleston, South Carolina, United States to the Clyde.
Morning Star	United Kingdom	The ship was wrecked near Sligo. She was on a voyage from New York, United States to Sligo.
Nancy	United States	The ship was driven ashore near Sheerness, Kent. She was on a voyage from Baltimore, Maryland to Rotterdam.
Omega	United Kingdom	The ship was driven ashore near Hellevoet, Zeeland, Batavian Republic. She was on a voyage from Sunderland, County Durham to Hellevoet.
Pennsylvania	United States	The ship was driven ashore in the River Foyle. She was on a voyage from Philadelphia, Pennsylvania to Londonderry. She was later refloated.
Russell	United Kingdom	The ship was driven ashore at Dublin. She was on a voyage from New York to Dublin.
Saphir	France	The ship was wrecked near Royan, Charente-Maritime.
Shamrock	United Kingdom	The ship was lost near Belfast, County Antrim with the loss of her captain. She was on a voyage from Liverpool to Belfast.
Sophia Margaretta	Bremen	The ship was wrecked on Heligoland. Her crew were rescued. She was on a voyage from Riga, Russia to Bremen.
Sophie	France	The ship was lost near Audierne, Finistère. She was on a voyage from L'Orient, Morbihan to Brest, Finistère.
Speculation	United Kingdom	The ship ran aground on the Long Sand, in the North Sea off the coast of Essex. Her crew survived. She was on a voyage from Ipswich, Suffolk to Liverpool.
Thomas & Hannah	United Kingdom	The ship was run down and sunk in the North Sea off Spurn Point, Yorkshire. Her crew were rescued.
Trois Gesusters	Batavian Republic	The ship was lost near Vlissingen, Zeeland. She was on a voyage from Livorno, Grand Duchy of Tuscany to Amsterdam, North Holland.
Unity	United Kingdom	The ship was wrecked at Southwold, Suffolk. She was on a voyage from Newcastle upon Tyne, Northumberland to Southwold.
Victoria	United Kingdom	The ship was driven ashore in the Weser.

== April ==
=== 1 April ===
List of shipwrecks: 1 April 1803
Ship	State	Description
Nymph	United Kingdom	The ship was wrecked in the Saltee Islands, County Cork. She was on a voyage from Lisbon, Portugal to Cork.

=== 3 April ===
List of shipwrecks: 3 April 1803
Ship	State	Description
Unnamed	United Kingdom	The sloop capsized off North Berwick, Lothian. She was on a voyage from Dunbar to Leith, Lothian. She drifted on to the Craigleith Rock with the loss of one life. Survivors were rescued by a boat from shore.

=== 14 April ===
List of shipwrecks: 14 April 1803
Ship	State	Description
Honket	United States	The ship was driven ashore near Vlissingen, Zeeland, Batavian Republic.

=== 15 April ===
List of shipwrecks: 15 April 1803
Ship	State	Description
Fanny	United Kingdom	The ship was driven ashore at the Cape of Good Hope. She was on a voyage from the Cape of Good Hope to Surinam and Hamburg.

=== 17 April ===
List of shipwrecks: 17 April 1803
Ship	State	Description
Margaret	(United Kingdom of Great Britain and Ireland) New South Wales	The brig ran aground on a reef in the Pacific Ocean and was wrecked. Her crew survived.

=== 18 April ===
List of shipwrecks: 18 April 1803
Ship	State	Description
Britannia	United Kingdom	The ship was wrecked at Bolt Head, Devon with the loss of all but one of her crew. She was on a voyage from Waterford to London.

=== 19 April ===
List of shipwrecks: 19 April 1803
Ship	State	Description
Catherine	United Kingdom	The ship was lost near Milford Haven, Pembrokeshire. She was on a voyage from Caernarfon to London.
Kitty	United Kingdom	The ship was driven ashore in Loch Indaal. She was on a voyage from Limerick to Liverpool, Lancashire.
Pomona	Dutch East India Company	The East Indiaman was driven ashore on Texel. She was on a voyage from Amsterdam to China.
Swan	United Kingdom	The ship was lost on Long Island with the loss of two of her crew. She was on a voyage from Liverpool, Lancashire to Narva, Russia.

=== 20 April ===
List of shipwrecks: 20 April 1803
Ship	State	Description
Unnamed	United Kingdom	The barge sank in the River Thames near Blackfriars Bridge, London. Both crew were rescued.

=== 22 April ===
List of shipwrecks: 22 April 1803
Ship	State	Description
Mary	United Kingdom	The ship was run ashore at Dover, Kent.
Michael	United Kingdom	The ship was wrecked at Kavero, Sweden with the loss of a crew member. She was on a voyage from London to Riga, Russia.

=== 23 April ===
List of shipwrecks: 23 April 1803
Ship	State	Description
Brilhante do Rio	Portugal	The ship was driven ashore at Lisbon. She was on a voyage from Brazil to Lisbon.

=== Unknown date ===
List of shipwrecks: Unknown date in April 1803
Ship	State	Description
Ann & Bell	United Kingdom	The ship was lost at Strangford, County Down. She was on a voyage from Irvine, Ayrshire to Dublin.
Charles	United Kingdom	The ship was driven ashore at Lowestoft, Suffolk. She was on a voyage from London to Great Yarmouth, Norfolk.
Duke of Kent	United Kingdom	The ship was driven ashore near Sligo. Her crew were rescued. She was on a voyage from Liverpool, Lancashire to the West Indies.
Earl Howe	United Kingdom	The ship was lost near Palermo, Sicily. She was on a voyage from Zakynthos, Septinsular Republic to London.
Elizabeth	United Kingdom	The ship was lost at Movill Bay. She was on a voyage from Porto, Portugal to Londonderry.
Integrity	United Kingdom	The brig was driven ashore on St. Nicholas Island, Devon. She was on a voyage from Newcastle upon Tyne, Northumberland to Plymouth, Devon.
John	(United Kingdom of Great Britain and Ireland) New South Wales	The ship departed from the Hawkesbury River on 29 May, but foundered in nearby Broken Bay. The crew were able to swim ashore.
John & Mary	United Kingdom	The sloop was wrecked on the Trinity Sands, in the Humber. Her crew were rescued.
Krone von Bremen	Bremen	The ship was driven ashore in the Weser. She was on a voyage from Baltimore, Maryland, United States to Bremen.
Liberty	United States	The ship was driven ashore at Vlissingen, Zeeland, Batavian Republic. She was on a voyage from Philadelphia, Pennsylvania, to Antwerp, Deux-Nèthes, France.
L'Innatendu	France	The ship was driven ashore near Valencia, Spain. She was on a voyage from Cette, Hérault to Antwerp.
Maria, or Mary	United Kingdom	The ship was driven ashore and wrecked near Irvine. She was on a voyage from Greenock, Renfrewshire to Memel, Prussia.
Mary	United Kingdom	The ship was driven ashore near Dover, Kent.
Newburgh	United Kingdom	The sloop sank at Penzance, Cornwall. Her crew were rescued.
Peggy	United Kingdom	The sloop was driven ashore at Holyhead, Anglesey. She was on a voyage from Cork to Liverpool.
Reliance	United Kingdom	The ship was lost near Banff, Aberdeenshire. She was on a voyage from Newcastle upon Tyne, Northumberland to Jamaica.
St Antonio de Padua	Spain	The ship was lost at Waterford, United Kingdom. She was on a voyage from St. Andero to Liverpool.
Wandersman	Flag unknown	The ship was driven ashore and wrecked on Texel, North Holland, Batavian Republic.

== May ==
=== 2 May ===
List of shipwrecks: 2 May 1803
Ship	State	Description
Isaac & Jane	United Kingdom	The ship was driven ashore at Duncannon, County Wexford. She was on a voyage from Waterford to Whitehaven, Cumberland.

=== 3 May ===
List of shipwrecks: 3 May 1803
Ship	State	Description
Unnamed	United Kingdom	The hoveller capsized off Dover, Kent with the loss of four lives.

=== 6 May ===
List of shipwrecks: 6 May 1803
Ship	State	Description
Eleanor	United States	The ship foundered in the Atlantic Ocean off Cape Hatteras, South Carolina. She was on a voyage from Barbados to Alexandria, Virginia.

=== 9 May ===
List of shipwrecks: 9 May 1803
Ship	State	Description
Johan Frederick	Stettin	The ship was wrecked on Terschelling, Friesland Batavian Republic. She was on a voyage from Stettin to London, United Kingdom.

=== 14 May ===
List of shipwrecks: 15 May 1803
Ship	State	Description
Dart	United Kingdom	The ship foundered off the Isle of Arran. She was on a voyage from Liverpool, Lancashire to Greenock, Renfrewshire.

=== 15 May ===
List of shipwrecks: 15 May 1803
Ship	State	Description
Daphne	United Kingdom	The ship was driven ashore near Wexford. She was on a voyage from Liverpool, Lancashire to Quebec City, Lower Canada, British North America.
George	(United Kingdom of Great Britain and Ireland) New South Wales	The ship ran aground on New Year's Island. She was severely damaged in gales on 6 and 23 June.
Oughton	United Kingdom	The ship was driven ashore at Charleston, South Carolina, United States.

=== 22 May ===
List of shipwrecks: 22 May 1803
Ship	State	Description
Goede Verwagting	Prussia	The brig was wrecked on the Goeree Sand, in the North Sea off the coast of Zeeland, Batavian Republic. Her crew were rescued.

=== 29 May ===
List of shipwrecks: 29 May 1803
Ship	State	Description
HMS Hussar	Royal Navy	The fifth rate ran aground on the Goodwin Sands, Kent. She was refloated the next day.

=== 31 May ===
List of shipwrecks: 31 May 1803
Ship	State	Description
HMS Resistance	Royal Navy	The fifth rate frigate was wrecked off Cape St. Mary's, Portugal.

=== Unknown date ===
List of shipwrecks: Unknown date in May 1803
Ship	State	Description
Abelino	Denmark–Norway	The ship was driven ashore on the south coast of the Isle of Wight, United Kingdom. She was on a voyage from Bordeaux, Gironde, France to Copenhagen.
Amazon	United Kingdom	The ship was lost in the Deva, Spain. She was on a voyage from London to the Deva.
Dart	United Kingdom	The ship sank in the North Sea off Saltcoats, Ayrshire.
Diana	Hamburg	The ship was wrecked near East Dean, Sussex, United Kingdom. She was on a voyage from Porta to Hamburg.
Dorothea	United Kingdom	The ship foundered in the Mediterranean Sea. She was on a voyage from Livorno, Grand Duchy of Tuscany to Gallipoli, Apulia, Italy.
Eendraght	Prussia	The hoy was wrecked at Harwich, Essex, United Kingdom.
Eliza	United Kingdom	The sloop foundered in Belfast Lough. She was on a voyage from Greenock, Renfrewshire to London.
Gaspard	France	The ship was driven ashore near Le Havre, Seine-Inférieure.
Gillert	Danzig	The ship was driven ashore near Hellevoet, Zeeland, Batavian Republic. She was on a voyage from Danzig to Schiedam, South Holland, Batavian Republic.
Isis	United Kingdom	The ship was driven ashore and wrecked at Memel, Prussia. She was on a voyage from Liverpool, Lancashire to Memel.
John & Edmond	United Kingdom	The Bristol-based slave ship was abandoned at sea.
Le Blaireau	France	The ship was in collision with a Spanish 64-gun Man-of-War off Cape St Mary, Portugal and foundered. Her crew were rescued. She was on a voyage from Martinique to Bordeaux.
Le Vengeur	France	The ship was driven ashore near "Tremblade". She was on a voyage from Nantes, Loire-Inférieure to St. Andero, Spain.
Lord Nelson	United Kingdom	The ship was lost at Tenerife, Canary Islands. She was on a voyage from Porto, Portugal to Liverpool.
Reliance	United Kingdom	The ship was wrecked near Troup Head, Aberdeenshire with the loss of all but one of her crew.
Sandwich	United Kingdom	The ship was wrecked on the Goodwin Sands, Kent. She was on a voyage from Caernarfon to London.
Syren	United Kingdom	The sloop foundered in the English Channel off the Casquets, Channel Islands. Her crew were rescued by the sloop St. Peter (United Kingdom). Syren was on a voyage from Guernsey, Channel Islands to Portsmouth, Hampshire.
Theodore	France	The ship was lost on the Île de Ré, Charente-Maritime. She was on a voyage from Nantes, Loire-Inférieure to La Rochelle, Charente-Maritime.
Wakefield	United Kingdom	The ship was wrecked at Alemouth while on a voyage from Dordrecht, South Holland to Aberdeen.

== June ==
=== 11 June ===
List of shipwrecks: 11 June 1803
Ship	State	Description
Diana	Flag unknown	The brig was driven ashore and wrecked near Boulogne, Pas-de-Calais, France.
Three Friends	United Kingdom	The ship departed from Málaga, Spain for London. No further trace, presumed foundered with the loss of all hands.

=== 13 June ===
List of shipwrecks: 13 June 1803
Ship	State	Description
L'Espiègle	France	War of the Third Coalition: The privateer, a lugger, was captured by Eling (United Kingdom). She was sunk by accident the next day.

=== 14 June ===
List of shipwrecks: 14 June 1803
Ship	State	Description
Penelope	United Kingdom	The ship was driven ashore on the Swedish coast.

=== 17 June ===
List of shipwrecks: 17 June 1803
Ship	State	Description
Severino	Portugal	The ship sprang a leak and foundered in the Atlantic Ocean. She was on a voyage from St. Ubes to Cork, United Kingdom.
Sisters	United Kingdom	The ship was wrecked on Onegada. Her crew were rescued. She was on a voyage from Trinidad to Bristol, Gloucestershire.

=== 20 June ===
List of shipwrecks: 20 June 1803
Ship	State	Description
Colossus	Royal Navy	The Colossus-class ship of the line ran aground in the River Thames near Erith, Kent. She was refloated and taken in to the Nore.

=== 22 June ===
List of shipwrecks: 22 June 1803
Ship	State	Description
Unnamed	Ottoman Tripolitania	First Barbary War:A Tripolitan privateer was burned by her crew and blew up when attacked by USS Enterprise (United States Navy) 5 or 6 leagues (13 or 16 nmi; 24 or 29 km) east of Tripoli.

=== 28 June ===
List of shipwrecks: 28 June 1803
Ship	State	Description
HM Packet Lady Hobart	United Kingdom	The Post Office packet ship struck an iceberg in the Atlantic Ocean 400 nautical miles (740 km) east of Newfoundland, British North America (46°33′N 44°00′W) and sank. All 29 crew survived, being rescued on 4 July, but a French POW jumped from the lifeboat and died.

=== Unknown date ===
List of shipwrecks: Unknown datein June 1803
Ship	State	Description
Happy	United Kingdom	The ship was lost near Waterford. She was on a voyage from Wilmington, Delaware, United States to Liverpool, Lancashire.
Perseverance	United Kingdom	The ship was wrecked at Memel, Prussia.
Senhor do Bonfim	Portugal	The ship foundered in the Atlantic Ocean. Her crew were rescued. She was on a voyage from St. Ubes to Cork, United Kingdom.
Successful Nancy	United Kingdom	The ship capsized at Liverpool.
Union	United Kingdom	The privateer was in collision with Brothers and sank in Liverpool Bay.
Westmoreland	United Kingdom	The privateer was wrecked on the Goodwin Sands, Kent. Her crew were rescued.

== July ==
=== 2 July ===
List of shipwrecks: 2 July 1803
Ship	State	Description
HMS Minerve	Royal Navy	The Minerve-class frigate ran aground at Cherbourg, Seine-Inférieure, France. She was subsequently engaged by shore-based artillery and the gunboats (Chiffonne and Terrible (both French Navy) and was captured. She was subsequently taken into French service as Cannonière.

=== 14 July ===
List of shipwrecks: 14 July 1803
Ship	State	Description
Ceres	United Kingdom	The ship was driven ashore and wrecked at Lowestoft, Suffolk. Her crew were rescued.
Sophy and Mary	(United Kingdom of Great Britain and Ireland) New South Wales	The ship was driven ashore and wrecked on Cabbage Tree Island. Her crew survived.

=== 21 July ===
List of shipwrecks: 21 July 1803
Ship	State	Description
HMS Seine	Royal Navy	War of the Third Coalition: The Seine-class frigate ran aground off Terschelling, Friesland, Batavian Republic. A Danish ship rescued 131 of her 145 crew. The fourteen remaining crew set her afire and destroyed her the next day to prevent her being captured by the French. They were rescued by the packet ship Dove (United Kingdom).

=== 29 July ===
List of shipwrecks: 29 July 1803
Ship	State	Description
Caledonia	United Kingdom	The East Indiaman caught fire and sank in the Indian Ocean with the loss of 94 lives. She was on a voyage from Balasore to Bombay, India.

=== 30 July ===
List of shipwrecks: 30 July 1803
Ship	State	Description
HMS Calypso	Royal Navy	The sloop of war was run down and sunk in the Atlantic Ocean by Dale (United Kingdom).

=== Unknown date ===
List of shipwrecks: Unknown date in July 1803
Ship	State	Description
Alert	United Kingdom	War of the Third Coalition: The ship was captured and burnt by the privateer Le Blond (France). She was on a voyage from Madeira to Galway.
Anna Catherina	Russia	The ship was lost on the Goodwin Sands, Kent, United Kingdom. She was on a voyage from Saint Petersburg to Lisbon, Portugal.
Aurora	France	The ship was driven ashore at Rocken, Isle of Wight, United Kingdom.
Blanche	United Kingdom	War of the Third Coalition: The ship was captured and burnt by the privateer Le Blond (France). She was on a voyage from Saint Thomas, Virgin Islands to Liverpool, Lancashire.
Ceres	United Kingdom	The ship was wrecked at Lowestoft, Suffolk.
Harmony	United Kingdom	The ship capsized in the River Lee. She was on a voyage from Cork to London.
Mary	United Kingdom	The ship was wrecked at Memel, Prussia. she was on a voyage from London to Memel.
Penelope	United Kingdom	The ship was lost at "Halsterborn", Sweden. She was on a voyage from London to Saint Petersburg.
Perseverance	United Kingdom	The ship was wrecked on the Memel Bar in the Baltic Sea. She was on a voyage from Memel to London.
Spring	United Kingdom	The ship was driven ashore on Steenskar, in the Gulf of Finland. She was on a voyage from Narva, Russia to London. She was refloated.
Susannah	United Kingdom	The ship was driven ashore on Bornholm, Denmark. She was refloated.

== August ==
=== 3 August ===
List of shipwrecks: 3 August 1803
Ship	State	Description
Mary	United Kingdom	The smack was wrecked at Bo'ness, Lothian with the loss of all hands. She was on a voyage from Bo'ness to Maryport, Cumberland.
Pastorenha	Portugal	The ship ran aground at Porto. She was on a voyage from Porto to London, United Kingdom.

=== 17 August ===
List of shipwrecks: 17 August 1803
Ship	State	Description
Cato	United Kingdom	HMS Porpoise and Cato. The ship was wrecked on the Wreck Reefs, New South Wales.
Mutine	French Navy	HMS Racoon destroys Mutine War of the Third Coalition: The 18-gun brig was driven ashore at Santiago de Cuba in an action with HMS Racoon (Royal Navy) and was wrecked.
HMS Porpoise	Royal Navy	The sloop-of-war was wrecked on the Wreck Reefs.

=== 18 August ===
List of shipwrecks: 18 August 1803
Ship	State	Description
Providence	United Kingdom	The ship was wrecked on the Red Island Reef, in the Saint Lawrence River. She was on a voyage from Liverpool to Quebec City, Lower Canada, British North America.

=== 29 August ===
List of shipwrecks: 29 August 1803
Ship	State	Description
Eagle	United Kingdom	The ship foundered in the Atlantic Ocean while on a voyage from the Grenada to Liverpool, Lancashire. Her crew were rescued.
Stanley	United Kingdom	The ship foundered in the Atlantic Ocean while on a voyage from Nevis to London. Her crew were rescued.

=== Unknown date ===
List of shipwrecks: Unknown date in August 1803
Ship	State	Description
Diamond	United Kingdom	The ship was driven ashore and wrecked in the River Thames at Canvey Island, Essex. She was on a voyage from Havana, Cuba to London. She was refloated.
Favorite	United Kingdom	The ship sank in the Humber.
Houghton	United Kingdom	The ship foundered in the China Seas with the loss of c.120 people.
Juan	Spain	The ship was captured by the slaves she was carrying. They murdered all but two of her crew and ran her ashore in the Rio Pongo, where she was wrecked.
Montequillex	Spain	The ship capsized and sank in the English Channel off Beachy Head, Sussex, United Kingdom. Her crew were rescued by Freundschaft (Flag unknown). She was on a voyage from Bremen to St. Lucar.
Peggy	United Kingdom	The ship was lost whilst on a voyage from Liverpool, Lancashire to Newry, County Antrim.

== September ==
=== 3 September ===
List of shipwrecks: 3 September 1803
Ship	State	Description
John and William	United Kingdom	The ship foundered in the English Channel off The Lizard, Cornwall. Her crew were rescued. She was on a voyage from Dartmouth, Devon to a Welsh port.

=== 4 September ===
List of shipwrecks: 4 September 1803
Ship	State	Description
Camel	Kingdom of Etruria	The ship foundered in the North Sea off Jutland. Her crew were rescued. She was on a voyage from Livorno, Grand Duchy of Tuscany to Narva, Russia.

=== 5 September ===
List of shipwrecks: 5 September 1803
Ship	State	Description
HMS Hound	Royal Navy	The sloop-of-war ran aground on the Gunfleet Sand, in the North Sea off the coast of Essex.

=== 12 September ===
List of shipwrecks: 12 September 1803
Ship	State	Description
Friede	Lübeck	The ship foundered in the Baltic Sea off Kronstadt, Russia.

=== 16 September ===
List of shipwrecks: 16 September 1803
Ship	State	Description
Unnamed	United Kingdom	The sloop caught fire off Whitby, Yorkshire. She put in to Whitby, where she capsized.

=== 17 September ===
List of shipwrecks: 17 September 1803
Ship	State	Description
Peggy	United Kingdom	The ship was wrecked in the Kattegat while on a voyage from Saint Petersburg, Russia to London.
Refuge	United Kingdom	The ship was wrecked in the Kattegat while on a voyage from Riga, Russia to Hull, Yorkshire.

=== 19 September ===
List of shipwrecks: 19 September 1803
Ship	State	Description
Unnamed	United Kingdom	The yacht was wrecked in The Downs with the loss of six of the eight people on board.

=== 20 September ===
List of shipwrecks: 20 September 1803
Ship	State	Description
Active	United Kingdom	The ship was driven ashore and wrecked on Canna, Inner Hebrides. She was on a voyage from Greenock, Renfrewshire to Lübeck.
Ann	United Kingdom	The ship was wrecked on Tiree, Inner Hebrides. Her crew were rescued. She was on a voyage from Memel, Prussia to Cork.

=== 21 September ===
List of shipwrecks: 21 September 1803
Ship	State	Description
Fame	United Kingdom	The ship was driven ashore on Hartley Bates Island, near Newcastle upon Tyne, Northumberland. Her crew were rescued.
Fanny	United Kingdom	The ship was driven ashore and wrecked on the coast of Norfolk with the loss of seven lives. She was on a voyage from Arkhangelsk, Russia to Hull, Yorkshire, or vice versa.
Hope	United Kingdom	The brig was driven ashore at Skinningrove, Yorkshire.
Nancy	United Kingdom	The ship was driven ashore at Truro, Cornwall and was wrecked. She was on a voyage from Waterford to Southampton, Hampshire.
Providence	United Kingdom	The ship was driven ashore at Whitburn, County Durham. She was refloated and taken in to Sunderland, County Durham.
Unnamed	United Kingdom	The brig was driven ashore at Redcar, Yorkshire.
Unnamed	United Kingdom	The brig was driven ashore at Marske-by-the-Sea, Yorkshire.

=== 22 September ===
List of shipwrecks: 22 September 1803
Ship	State	Description
Anstruther	United Kingdom	A strong south-west gale drove Anstruther past Balambangan Island and onto the shoals by Banggi Island. Losses were heavy.
Thornhill	United Kingdom	Thornhill was lost at the same time and place as Anstruther.

=== 28 September ===
List of shipwrecks: 28 September 1803
Ship	State	Description
Yekaterina Magdalina (Екатерина Магдалина)	Imperial Russian Navy	The transport ship was driven ashore and wrecked at Kadriorg, Reval. Her crew were rescued. She was subsequently dismantled in situ.
Venus	Batavian Republic	The ship foundered in the North Sea off the Galloper Sandbank while on a voyage from Schiedam, South Holland to Bilbao, Spain. Five of her crew survived.

=== 29 September ===
List of shipwrecks: 29 September 1803
Ship	State	Description
San Façon	France	War of the Third Coalition: The sloop ran aground between Dunkerque, Nord and Nieuwpoort, Lys in an action with HMS Jackal (Royal Navy) and was abandoned by her crew. She was captured by HMS Jackal..

=== 30 September ===
List of shipwrecks: 30 September 1803
Ship	State	Description
Yung Piter (Юнг Питер, 'Jung Peter')	Imperial Russian Navy	The transport ship was driven ashore at Narva. Her crew were rescued. She was on a voyage from Kronstadt to Reval.

=== Unknown date ===
List of shipwrecks: Unknown date in September 1803
Ship	State	Description
Britannia	United Kingdom	The ship was driven ashore on the Russian coast. She was refloated and put back to Arkhangelsk in a leaky condition.
Calminda	Danzig	The ship was lost on the Anholt Reef, Denmark. She was on a voyage from Danzig to London, United Kingdom.
Fire Damer	Hamburg	War of the Third Coalition: The ship was detained by the privateer James (United Kingdom) and was sent into Falmouth, Cornwall, United Kingdom, where she ran ashore. Fire Damer was on a voyage from Marseille, Bouches-du-Rhone, France to Hamburg.
George	United Kingdom	The ship was driven ashore at Wallasey, Cheshire. She was on a voyage from Africa to Liverpool, Lancashire.
Hawke	United Kingdom	The ship was wrecked on the Gunfleet Sand, in the North Sea off the coast of Essex. All on board were rescued by Romulus (United Kingdom). Hawke was on a voyage from Newcastle upon Tyne, Northumberland to London.
Hope	United Kingdom	The ship was driven ashore in the River Thames at Blackwall, Middlesex. She was on a voyage from Jamaica to London.
Kingston	United Kingdom	War of the Third Coalition: The ship was captured and burnt by the privateer Reprisal (France). She was on a voyage from Swansea, Glamorgan to Porto, Portugal.
Mary and Betsey	United Kingdom	The ship was abandoned off Land's End, Cornwall. She was discovered by Surprize ( (United Kingdom of Great Britain and Ireland) Guernsey) and taken in to Guernsey.
Ocean	United Kingdom	The ship sank at Liverpool.
Peggy	United Kingdom	The ship was lost at "Wingo", Sweden. Her crew were rescued.
Refuge	United Kingdom	The ship was lost at "Wingo", Sweden. Her crew were rescued.
Ruby	United Kingdom	The ship was driven ashore and wrecked on the coast of Sweden. She was on a voyage from Riga, Russia to Hull, Yorkshire.
Uranus	Stolpe	The ship was lost at Stolpe. She was on a voyage from Stolp to London.
Victory	United Kingdom	The ship was wrecked on the Hoyle Bank, in Liverpool Bay with the loss of 45 of her crew. She was on a voyage from Liverpool to Africa.
Wenskabet	Duchy of Holstein	The ship foundered in the North Sea off Tönning. She was on a voyage from Newcastle upon Tyne to Tönning.
Unnamed	France	War of the Third Coalition: The privateer, a prize of HMS Constance (Royal Navy), was wrecked on the Vogel Sand, off the mouth of the Elbe.

== October ==
=== 1 October ===
List of shipwrecks: 1 October 1803
Ship	State	Description
Les Sept Frères	France	War of the Third Coalition: The privateer lugger was driven ashore at Gravelines Nord in an action with HMS Merlin (Royal Navy) and was wrecked.

=== 4 October ===
List of shipwrecks: 4 October 1803
Ship	State	Description
Lord Nelson	United Kingdom	The ship foundered in the Atlantic Ocean. Her crew were rescued. She was on a voyage from Porto, Portugal to Portsmouth, Hampshire.

=== 8 October ===
List of shipwrecks: 8 October 1803
Ship	State	Description
Actæon	United Kingdom	The ship was driven ashore on Gotland, Sweden. She was on a voyage from Narva, Russia to Hull, Yorkshire.
Brifield	United Kingdom	The ship was wrecked on Læsø, Denmark while on a voyage from Memel, Prussia to Plymouth, Devon. Her crew were rescued.
Carl Frederick	Sweden	The ship was lost on the Runnel Stone. She was on a voyage from Stockholm to Dublin, United Kingdom.
Union	United States	The ship was driven ashore and wrecked at North Somercotes, Lincolnshire, United Kingdom. She was on a voyage from New York to Hull.

=== 9 October ===
List of shipwrecks: 9 October 1803
Ship	State	Description
Gribsvald (Грибсвальд, 'Greifswald')	Imperial Russian Navy	The transport ship was wrecked near Vindava, Courland Governorate with the loss of eight of her crew. She was on a voyage from Kronstadt to Riga.
Mary and Margaret	United Kingdom	The ship was wrecked on the Newcomb Sand, in the North Sea off Lowestoft, Suffolk. All on board were rescued.

=== 11 October ===
List of shipwrecks: 11 October 1803
Ship	State	Description
Ann	United Kingdom	The sloop caught fire in the Irish Sea and was abandoned by her crew. She was on a voyage from Liverpool, Lancashire.

=== 12 October ===
List of shipwrecks: 12 October 1803
Ship	State	Description
Venus	United Kingdom	The ship was wrecked on the north coast of Gotland, Sweden. She was on a voyage from Saint Petersburg, Russia to London.

=== 13 October ===
List of shipwrecks: 13 October 1803
Ship	State	Description
Pomona	United Kingdom	The ship foundered in the White Sea 2 leagues (6 nautical miles (11 km) north of the Cape of Good Fortune, Russia with the loss of a crew member.

=== 14 October ===
List of shipwrecks: 14 October 1803
Ship	State	Description
Cyclops	United Kingdom	The sloop was driven ashore near St. Asaph, Denbirghshire with the loss of two of the six people on board.
Friend's Adventure	United Kingdom	The brig was driven ashore at Mappleton, Yorkshire and was wrecked while on a voyage from London to Sunderland, County Durham. Her five crew survived.
Lord Nelson	United Kingdom	The ship was reported to have foundered in the Baltic Sea while on a voyage from London to Saint Petersburg, Russia. Her crew were rescued by Friends (United Kingdom) Lord Nelson was subsequently discovered by Betsey and Susan (United Kingdom) and taken in to Ventspils, Courland Governorate.

=== 15 October ===
List of shipwrecks: 15 October 1803
Ship	State	Description
Fortuna	Danzig	The ship foundered off Fort Rouge while on a voyage from Danzig to Bruges, Lys, France.
Sir Andrew Mitchell	United Kingdom	The ship was wrecked in the Bay of Fundy. She was on a voyage from the Bay of Fundy to Liverpool, Lancashire.

=== 16 October ===
List of shipwrecks: 15 October 1803
Ship	State	Description
Liddell	United Kingdom	The brig was wrecked in the Bay of Skaill, Orkney Islands with the loss of all hands.

=== 17 October ===
List of shipwrecks: 15 October 1803
Ship	State	Description
Gustavus Adolphus the Fourth	Russia	The ship was wrecked at Waldam, near Calais, France. Her crew were rescued. She was on a voyage from Saint Petersburg to Lisbon, Portugal.
Waakende Oog	Prussia	The ship was driven ashore at Skagen, Denmark. She was on a voyage from Memel to London, United Kingdom.

=== 18 October ===
List of shipwrecks: 18 October 1803
Ship	State	Description
Cybelle	United Kingdom	The ship departed from Newfoundland, British North America for Grenada. No further trace, presumed foundered in the Atlantic Ocean with the loss of all hands.
HMS Euryalus	Royal Navy	The Apollo-class frigate was driven ashore on Spike Island, County Cork.
HMS Hound	Royal Navy	The sloop-of-war ran aground in the Swin.
Three Sisters	United States	The ship foundered while on a voyage from Boston, Massachusetts, to Demerara. Her crew were rescued on 29 October by the lugger Vautour or Venteure (France).

=== 21 October ===
List of shipwrecks: 21 October 1803
Ship	State	Description
Ann	United Kingdom	The ship ran aground on the Herd Sand, in the North Sea off the coast of County Durham.

=== 22 October ===
List of shipwrecks: 22 October 1803
Ship	State	Description
Gypsey	United Kingdom	The ship was wrecked on Gramsay, Orkney Islands with the loss of her captain. She was on a voyage from Hull, Yorkshire to New York, United States. Also reported as having happened on 24 October.

=== 25 October ===
List of shipwrecks: 25 October 1803
Ship	State	Description
Margaretta Elizabeth	Prussia	The ship was wrecked on Gotland, Sweden. She was on a voyage from Saint Petersburg, Russia to Pillau.

=== 28 October ===
List of shipwrecks: 28 October 1803
Ship	State	Description
Meteor	United Kingdom	The ship ran aground and capsized in the River Trent near Gainsborough, Lincolnshire. She was on a voyage from Newhaven, Sussex to Gainsborough. She was refloated.

=== 29 October ===
List of shipwrecks: 29 October 1803
Ship	State	Description
General Baird	United Kingdom	The ship was destroyed by fire at Balambangan Island.

=== 30 October ===
List of shipwrecks: 30 October 1803
Ship	State	Description
Crescent	United Kingdom	The ship foundered in Narva Bay.

=== 31 October ===
List of shipwrecks: 31 October 1803
Ship	State	Description
Eagle	United Kingdom	The cutter foundered in the North Sea off Margate, Kent with the loss of 26 of the 53 people on board. She was on a voyage from Husum, Duchy of Schleswig to Lymington, Hampshire. Survivors were rescued by Dispatch (United Kingdom).
Hope	(United Kingdom of Great Britain and Ireland) New South Wales	The sloop was wrecked on North Head, New South Wales. Her three crew were rescued.
USS Philadelphia	United States Navy	First Barbary War:The frigate ran aground on an uncharted reef two miles (3 km) off Tripoli Harbor while giving chase and firing upon a Tripoli navy ship. She was captured by Tripolitans, refloated on 2 November and taken into Tripoli harbor.

=== Unknown date ===
List of shipwrecks: Unknown date in October 1803
Ship	State	Description
Alexander	United Kingdom	The ship was wrecked on the coast of Sweden.
Atlas	United Kingdom	The ship was driven ashore 2 or 3 leagues (5.2 or 7.8 nmi; 9.7 or 14.5 km) south of Cross Island, Russia.
Belfield	United Kingdom	The ship was driven ashore and wrecked on Læsø, Denmark. Her crew were rescued.
Betsey	United Kingdom	The ship was wrecked in the Gulf of Finland while on a voyage from London to Saint Petersburg, Russia.
Braun Ross	Danzig	The ship foundered in the Baltic Sea. She was on a voyage from Portsmouth, Hampshire to Danzig.
Brilliant	United Kingdom	The ship was wrecked on the coast of Sweden. She was on a voyage from Hull to Reval, Russia.
Cecil	United Kingdom	The ship was driven ashore and wrecked near Fairlie, Ayrshire. She was on a voyage from Larne, County Antrim to Greenock, Renfrewshire.
Ceres	United Kingdom	The ship was wrecked on the coast of Sweden. Her crew were rescued. She was on a voyage from London to Lübeck.
Charlotte Louise	Prussia	The ship was wrecked on the Vogel Sand, in the North Sea off the coast of the Batavian Republic. She was on a voyage from Memel to London.
Cicero	United Kingdom	The ship was driven ashore on Saltholm (or Dragoe), Denmark. She was on a voyage from Narva, Russia to Liverpool, Lancashire. She was gotten off.
Diana	United Kingdom	The ship was wrecked at the Cape of Good Hope.
Dimitrii	Russia	During a voyage from Okhotsk, Russia, to Kodiak in Russian America, the transport vessel was wrecked in the Catherine Archipelago near Umnak. Her crew and cargo survived, but she was a total loss.
Fama	Portugal	The ship was lost on Texel, North Holland, Batavian Republic.
Friends	United Kingdom	The ship was driven ashore on the Holderness coast, Yorkshire.
Friendship	United Kingdom	The ship was wrecked at Memel with the loss of a crew member. She was on a voyage from Plymouth, Devon to Memel.
Fortune	United Kingdom	The ship was wrecked at Narva.
Guardian	United Kingdom	The ship was driven ashore and wrecked at Memel.
Jane	United Kingdom	The ship was driven ashore at Memel.
Jason	United Kingdom	The ship was wrecked on the Goodwin Sands, Kent. She was on a voyage from Sunderland, County Durham to Exeter, Devon.
John & Mary	United Kingdom	The ship was driven ashore at "Wingo", Sweden.
Jong Peter	Lübeck	The ship was wrecked on Saaremaa, Russia. She was on a voyage from Lübeck to Saint Petersburg.
Liddel	United Kingdom	The ship was wrecked in the Orkney Islands.
Margaret	United Kingdom	The ship was driven ashore at Höganäs, Sweden. She was on a voyage from Saint Petersburg to Hull.
Marquis of Lansdown	United Kingdom	The ship was driven ashore at Skagen, Denmark. She was on a voyage from Saint Petersburgh to London.
Martha	United Kingdom	The ship was wrecked at Reval, Russia.
Mercury	United Kingdom	The ship was driven ashore near King's Lynn, Norfolk. She was on a voyage from Memel to Liverpool.
Nancy	United Kingdom	The ship was driven ashore and wrecked at "Latholm", Sweden. She was on a voyage from Hull to Reval.
Nile	United Kingdom	The ship was wrecked at Memel.
Nymph	United Kingdom	The ship foundered in the Baltic Sea. Her crew were rescued. She was on a voyage from Riga, Russia to Exeter.
Olive Branch	United Kingdom	The ship was driven ashore and wrecked on the coast of Sweden, or at the Three Crowns, Copenhage, Denmark.
Ruby	United Kingdom	The ship was driven ashore 2 or 3 leagues (5.2 or 7.8 nmi; 9.7 or 14.5 km) south of Cross Island.
Salem	United Kingdom	The ship was driven ashore in Carmarthen Bay. She was on a voyage from Porto, Portugal to Carmarthen and Bristol, Gloucestershire.
Samuel and Thomas	United Kingdom	The ship was driven ashore on the coast of Sweden.
Vigilance	United Kingdom	The ship was wrecked at Blakeney, Norfolk.
Wilhelmine	Danzig	The ship was lost near Danzig. She was on a voyage from Liverpool to Danzig.

== November ==
=== 1 November ===
List of shipwrecks: 3 November 1803
Ship	State	Description
Loyalty	United Kingdom	The sloop was wrecked in the Isles of Scilly. She was on a voyage from Liverpool, Lancashire to Plymouth, Devon.

=== 2 November ===
List of shipwrecks: 2 November 1803
Ship	State	Description
Magdalen	United Kingdom	The ship was driven ashore on Madeira.
Unnamed	France	The ship was wrecked near Colchester, Essex, United Kingdom. Her 29 crew survived.

=== 3 November ===
List of shipwrecks: 3 November 1803
Ship	State	Description
Louisa	Hamburg	The brig was driven ashore and wrecked at Mottistone, Isle of Wight, United Kingdom. She was on a voyage from Porto, Portugal to Christiania, Denmark.

=== 4 November ===
List of shipwrecks: 4 November 1803
Ship	State	Description
Reizende Wandringsman	Batavian Republic	The ship departed from Hellevoetsluis, Zeeland for Oléron, Charente-Maritime, France. No further trace, presumed foundered with the loss of all hands.

=== 5 November ===
List of shipwrecks: 5 November 1803
Ship	State	Description
Eliza	United Kingdom	The ship was driven ashore and wrecked at Sandhale, near Saltfleet, Lincolnshire. She was on a voyage from Narva, Russia to Hull, Yorkshire.

=== 6 November ===
List of shipwrecks: 6 November 1803
Ship	State	Description
Jason	United Kingdom	The ship was driven ashore at Sunderland, County Durham. She was on a voyage from London to Sunderland. She was later refloated.
Thetis	United Kingdom	The ship struck the Hendon Rock, in the North Sea off Sunderland and sank. Her crew were rescued. She was on a voyage from South Shields, County Durham to Sunderland.

=== 7 November ===
List of shipwrecks: 7 November 1803
Ship	State	Description
Bell	United Kingdom	The ship ran aground on the Herd Sand, in the North Sea off the coast of County Durham. She was refloated with the assistance of the lifeboat Northumberland (United Kingdom).
Nine unnamed vessels	French Navy	The gunboats were driven ashore and wrecked between Cap Blanc Nez, Pas-de-Calais and Gravelines, Nord with loss of life.
Five unnamed vessels	French Navy	The gunboats foundered in the English Channel off the coast of Pas-de-Calais.

=== 8 November ===
List of shipwrecks: 8 November 1803
Ship	State	Description
Sly	(United Kingdom of Great Britain and Ireland) Guernsey	The ship departed from Virginia, United States for Guernsey. No further trace, presumed foundered with the loss of all hands.

=== 9 November ===
List of shipwrecks: 9 November 1803
Ship	State	Description
Francis	United States	The brig ran aground on a reef and was bilged a cable's length off Carbaritta Point near Algeciras in a squall.
Sally	United Kingdom	The ship sprang a leak and was beached at South Shields, County Durham where she was wrecked. She was on a voyage from Saint Petersburg, Russia to London. Her crew survived.

=== 10 November ===
List of shipwrecks: 10 November 1803
Ship	State	Description
HMS Garland	Royal Navy	The sixth rate post ship ran aground off Cap François, Hispaniola. She was set afire and abandoned the next day.
Vrow Gertrude	Rostock	The ship departed from Gravesend, Kent, United Kingdom for Rostock. No further trace, presumed foundered with the loss of all hands.

=== 11 November ===
List of shipwrecks: 11 November 1803
Ship	State	Description
Charlotte	United Kingdom	The ship capsized in the English Channel. Her crew were rescued. She was on a voyage from Poole, Dorset to Portsmouth, Hampshire.

=== 12 November ===
List of shipwrecks: December 1802
Ship	State	Description
Gunboat № 344	French Navy	The gunboat was driven ashore on Hayling Island, Hampshire, United Kingdom and was taken possession of by a Customs officer.
Thomas Jefferson	United States	The ship departed from Baltimore, Maryland, for Porto, Portugal. No further trace, presumed foundered in the Atlantic Ocean with the loss of all hands.

=== 13 November ===
List of shipwrecks: 13 November 1803
Ship	State	Description
Friend's Goodwill	United Kingdom	The sloop was wrecked at Whitby, Yorkshire. She was on a voyage from Sunderland, County Durham to Whitby.
Marianne	United Kingdom	The ship was wrecked at Port Antonio, Jamaica.

=== 14 November ===
List of shipwrecks: 14 November 1803
Ship	State	Description
Dash	United Kingdom	The ship was wrecked on the Haisborough Sands, in the North Sea off the coast of Norfolk. Her crew were rescued. She was on a voyage from Saint Petersburgh, Russia to London.
Little Catherine	Denmark–Norway	The ship was driven ashore on the Niding. She was on a voyage from Copenhagen to the West Indies. Little Catherine was later refloated and taken into Kalfsund, Sweden.
No. 344	French Navy	The gunboat was driven ashore on Hayling Island, Hampshire, United Kingdom.

=== 15 November ===
List of shipwrecks: 15 November 1803
Ship	State	Description
Sophia	(United Kingdom of Great Britain and Ireland) Guernsey	The ship foundered in the English Channel off Beachy Head, Sussex. Her crew survived. She was on a voyage from Guernsey to London.
Success	United Kingdom	The ship was wrecked on the Spanish Battery Rocks, South Shields, County Durham. Her crew were rescued.

=== 16 November ===
List of shipwrecks: 16 November 1803
Ship	State	Description
Several unnamed vessels	France	War of the Third Coalition: The chasse-marées were driven ashore and wrecked in an engagement with HMS Poulette (Royal Navy).

=== 17 November ===
List of shipwrecks: 17 November 1803
Ship	State	Description
Ann	United Kingdom	The sloop was destroyed by fire in the Irish Sea while on a voyage from Liverpool, Lancashire to Ramelton, County Donegal. Her crew survived.
HMS Circe	Royal Navy	The Enterprise-class frigate was wrecked on the Lemon and Ore Sandbank, in the North Sea off the coast of Norfolk. Her crew were rescued by three fishing vessels.
James and Ruth	United Kingdom	The ship foundered in the Baltic Sea off Reval, Russia. She was on a voyage from Narva, Russia to Chepstow, Monmouthshire.
HMS Leda	Royal Navy	The Leda-class frigate ran aground at Dungeness, Kent. She was refloated.

=== 18 November ===
List of shipwrecks: 19 November 1803
Ship	State	Description
Countess of Chatham	United Kingdom	The ship was driven ashore on Coll, Outer Hebrides. She was on a voyage from Christiana, Norway to Barnstaple, Devon.
Joseph	United Kingdom	The ship was abandoned in the Atlantic Ocean (46°14′N 42°30′W). Her crew were rescued. She was on a voyage from New York, United States to Plymouth, Devon.

=== 19 November ===
List of shipwrecks: 19 November 1803
Ship	State	Description
John & Ann	United Kingdom	The ship departed from Newfoundland, British North America for Greenock, Renfrewshire. No further trace, presumed foundered in the Atlantic Ocean with the loss of all hands.
La Conception	Spain	The polacca was driven ashore in the Bay of Cádiz.
L'Adeie	France	The brig was driven ashore in the Bay of Cádiz.
21 Unnamed vessels	France	War of the Third Coalition: The ships were burnt at Monte Christi Saint-Domingue by HMS Blanche (Royal Navy).

=== 20 November ===
List of shipwrecks: 20 November 1803
Ship	State	Description
Sally	United States	The American Government-chartered ship carrying United States Navy supplies ran aground at Torre del a Higuerilla near the Bar of St. Lucar, near Cádiz, a total loss.
Vrouw Geeske Margaritha	Batavian Republic	The ship was wrecked on Ameland, Friesland with the loss of two lives. She was on a voyage from Amsterdam, North Holland to Copenhagen, Denmark.

=== 22 November ===
List of shipwrecks: 22 November 1803
Ship	State	Description
Affinity	United Kingdom	The ship was driven ashore at Southsea, Hampshire.
Bellona	United Kingdom	The ship was driven ashore at Southsea.
Unnamed	United Kingdom	The sloop was driven ashore and wrecked at Plymouth, Devon. Her crew were rescued.

=== 23 November ===
List of shipwrecks: 23 November 1803
Ship	State	Description
Caroline	United Kingdom	The ship foundered in the North Sea off Domesnes, Norway with the loss of all hands. She was on a voyage from Danzig to London.

=== 24 November ===
List of shipwrecks: 24 November 1803
Ship	State	Description
Speculation	United Kingdom	The ship was lost near Calais, France. She was on a voyage from Newcastle upon Tyne, Northumberland to Weymouth, Dorset.
Unnamed	Flag unknown	The ship foundered in the North Sea off Blakeney, Norfolk, United Kingdom.
Two unnamed vessels	Flags unknown	The ships were driven ashore at Blakeney.

=== 25 November ===
List of shipwrecks: 26 November 1803
Ship	State	Description
Commerce	United States	The ship was lost near Hellevoet, Zeeland, Batavian Republic.
Favorite	United States	The ship was lost near Hellevoet.
HMS Snipe	United Kingdom	The gun-brig drove from her anchors and collided with two merchant ships off Grimsby, Lincolnshire. She was taken in to Grimsby for repairs.

=== 26 November ===
List of shipwrecks: 26 November 1803
Ship	State	Description
Crown Prince	Danzig	The ship was lost on the Sandhammer Reef, in the Baltic Sea. She was on a voyage from Danzig to and English port.
Jonge Kock	Prussia	The ship was wrecked at the mouth of the Ems while on a voyage from London, United Kingdom to Emden, Kingdom of Hanover.

=== 28 November ===
List of shipwrecks: 28 November 1803
Ship	State	Description
Bee	United Kingdom	The brigantine was wrecked at South Shields, County Durham. All six crew were rescued by the lifeboat Northumberland (United Kingdom).
William	United Kingdom	The ship departed from Miramichi, New Brunswick, British North America for Liverpool, Lancashire. No further trace, presumed foundered in the Atlantic Ocean with the loss of all hands.

=== 29 November ===
List of shipwrecks: 28 November 1803
Ship	State	Description
Fanny	United Kingdom	The merchantman wrecked in the South China Sea.

=== 30 November ===
List of shipwrecks: 30 November 1803
Ship	State	Description
Dolphin	United Kingdom	The ship was driven ashore on Anholt, Denmark.
Grezell	United Kingdom	The ship was wrecked at Cape Wrath, Caithness. She was on a voyage from Gothenburg, Sweden to Ayr.
Jason	United Kingdom	The ship was driven ashore on Læsø. She was subsequently wrecked on Anholt, Denmark.
Langton	United Kingdom	The ship was wrecked on the Nidens, in the Kattegat. She was on a voyage from Memel to Lancaster, Lancashire.
Laurel	United Kingdom	The ship was wrecked on the Nidens. She was on a voyage from Saint Petersburg, Russia to London.
Maria Margareth or Mary and Margaret	United Kingdom	The ship was wrecked on the Nidens. She was on a voyage from Riga, Russia to Leith, Lothian.
Norval	United Kingdom	The ship was wrecked 30 leagues (90 nautical miles (170 km) from Bic, Lower Canada, British North America. Her crew were rescued. She was on a voyage from Quebec City, Lower Canada to Lisbon, Portugal.
William	United Kingdom	The ship was driven ashore on Anholt.
Young Henry	United Kingdom	The ship was driven ashore on Læsø. She was refloated and taken in to Copenhagen in a leaky condition.
5 unnamed vessels	Flags unknown	The ships were driven ashore on Læsø.

=== Unknown date ===
List of shipwrecks: Unknown date in November 1803
Ship	State	Description
Admiral Nelson	United Kingdom	The ship was abandoned in the Baltic Sea. Her crew were rescued by Friends (United Kingdom). She was on a voyage from London to Saint Petersburg, Russia.Admiral Nelson was later towed into Ventava, Courland Governorate by Betty's and Susan (United Kingdom). She was a total loss.
Alethea	United Kingdom	The ship was wrecked near Kuressaare, Russia. She was on a voyage from Liverpool, Lancashire to Reval, Russia
Aurora	United Kingdom	The ship was driven ashore and wrecked at Deal, Kent.
Boreas	United Kingdom	The ship was driven ashore and damaged at Danzig.
Caroline	France	The ship, a prize, was driven ashore and wrecked at Northfleet, Kent.
Catharine	United Kingdom	The ship was driven ashore at Formby, Lancashire. She was on a voyage from Dublin to Liverpool.
Charlotte	United Kingdom	The ship was wrecked on Anticosti Island, Lower Canada, British North America. She was on a voyage from Quebec City, Lower Canada to Jamaica.
Christian	Duchy of Holstein	The ship was driven ashore near Tonningen. She was on a voyage from Hull, Yorkshire, United Kingdom to Tonningen.
Christina	Sweden	The ship was driven ashore and wrecked near "Kongsbacka". She was on a voyage from London to Gothenburg.
Dre Zeelust	Flag unknown	The ship foundered in the White Sea with the loss of all hands.
Dolphin	United Kingdom	The ship foundered off Beaumaris, Anglesey. She was on a voyage from Newry, County Antrim to Liverpool.
Felicite	Prussia	The ship was lost in the Baltic Sea. She was on a voyage from Memel to London.
Fortuna	United Kingdom	The ship foundered in Narva Bay. She was on a voyage from Narva, Russia to Liverpool.
Gipsey	United Kingdom	The ship foundered off the Orkney Islands. She was on a voyage from New York, United States to Hull.
Hermes	United Kingdom	The ship was driven ashore and wrecked at Lowestoft, Suffolk. She was on a voyage from Saint Petersburg to London.
Hussar	United Kingdom	The privateer was wrecked on the Isle of Skye.
Industry	United Kingdom	The ship was driven ashore at Deal.
John	United Kingdom	The ship was driven ashore at Danzig. She was on a voyage from Kirkcaldy, Fife to Danzig.
Juffrow Jacobi	Lübeck	The ship was wrecked on the Goodwin Sands, Kent, United Kingdom with the loss of four of her crew. She was on a voyage from Liverpool to Lübeck.
Little George	United Kingdom	The ship was wrecked on the Île d'Orleans, Lower Canada, British North America before 22 November. She was on a voyage from Quebec City, Lower Canada to Bristol, Gloucestershire.
Margaret & Eliza	United Kingdom	The ship was driven ashore on Gotland, Sweden. She was on a voyage from Narva to Liverpool.
Martha	United Kingdom	The ship was wrecked near Reval, Russia.
Martin	United Kingdom	The ship was driven ashore and severely damaged at Plymouth, Devon. She was later refloated and taken into Plymouth.
Nile	United Kingdom	The ship foundered in the Baltic Sea. Her crew were rescued. Also reported as being wrecked at Memel.
Northumberland	United Kingdom	The ship was driven ashore at Dragør, Denmark. She was later refloated and taken into Helsingør, Denmark.
Polly & Nancy	United Kingdom	The ship was wrecked near Padstow, Cornwall. She was on a voyage from Cork to London.
Robert	United Kingdom	The ship was driven ashore on the Isle of Mull. She was on a voyage from Saint Petersburg to Dublin.
Sally	United Kingdom	The ship departed from Helsingør, Denmark for Portsmouth, Hampshire on 20 November. No further trace, presumed foundered with the loss of all hands.
Sophia Dorothea	Lübeck	The ship departed from Hull for Lübeck. No further trace, presumed foundered with the loss of all hands.
Sparsamhest	Lübeck	The ship was lost near Dagerort, Russia. She was on a voyage from Saint Petersburg to Lübeck.
St. Eric	Sweden	The ship was wrecked on the Swedish coast. She was on a voyage from Öland to Hull.
Success	United Kingdom	The ship was wrecked at South Shields, County Durham.
Susanna	United Kingdom	The ship was wrecked on Saaremaa, Russia. Her crew were rescued.
Theodore	United Kingdom	The ship was driven ashore in the Orkney Islands. She was on a voyage from Danzig to Londonderry.
Trimmer	United Kingdom	The ship was wrecked near Étaples, Pas-de-Calais, France with the loss of all hands. She was on a voyage from London to Barcelona, Spain.
Unnamed	Batavian Republic	The privateer was wrecked on the coast of Norway with the loss of twenty of her 62 crew.
Unnamed	Hamburg	The ship foundered in the North Sea. She was on a voyage from the Firth of Forth to Hamburg.

== December ==
=== 1 December ===
List of shipwrecks: 1 December 1803
Ship	State	Description
Albion	United Kingdom	The ship was driven ashore on Læsø, Denmark and was wrecked. Her crew were rescued. She was on a voyage from Saint Petersburg, Russia to London.
Anna Buletta	Denmark–Norway	The ship was abandoned in the Atlantic Ocean. Her crew were rescued by Neptunus (United Kingdom). Anna Buletta was on a voyage from Saint Croix to Copenhagen.
Argo	United Kingdom	The ship was driven ashore on Læsø. Her crew were rescued. She was on a voyage from Saint Petersburg to London. Argo was refloated in June 1804 and taken into Aalborg, Denmark for repairs.
Atty	United Kingdom	The ship was wrecked on Læsø with the loss of all hands.
Clementina	United Kingdom	The ship was wrecked on Læsø with the loss of all hands. She was on a voyage from Memel, Prussia to Chepstow, Monmouthshire.
Constantia	Prussia	The ship foundered off the mouth of the Weser while on a voyage from Plymouth, Devon, United Kingdom to Emden. Her crew were rescued.
Dorothea	United Kingdom	The ship was driven ashore on Læsø and was wrecked with the loss of all hands. She was on a voyage from Danzig, Prussia to Hull, Yorkshire.
Duke of Athol	United Kingdom	The ship was driven ashore on Læsø and was wrecked. Her crew were rescued. She was on a voyage from Riga, Russia to London.
Jason	United Kingdom	The ship was driven ashore of Læsø and was wrecked with the loss of five of her crew. She was on a voyage from Saint Petersburg to London.
Joseph and Hannah	United Kingdom	The ship was driven ashore on Læsø and was wrecked with the loss of all hands. She was on a voyage from Memel, Prussia to London.
Rebecca	United Kingdom	The ship was driven ashore on Læsø and was wrecked with the loss of a crew member. She was on a voyage from Riga to Leith, Lothian.
Retrieve	United Kingdom	The ship was driven ashore and wrecked on Læsø. Her crew survived.
Satisfaction	United Kingdom	The ship was driven ashore on Læsø and was wrecked with the loss of two of her crew. She was on a voyage from Saint Petersburg to London.
Simpson	United Kingdom	The ship was driven ashore and wrecked on Læsø.
Standard	United Kingdom	The ship was driven ashore on Læsø with the loss of all hands. She was on a voyage from Saint Petersburg to London.
Supply	United Kingdom	The ship was driven ashore on Læsø and was wrecked. Her crew were rescued. She was on a voyage from Danzig, Prussia to Whitby, Yorkshire. She was refloated in May 1804 and taken into Aalborg.
Seven unnamed vessels	Flags unknown	The ships were driven ashore on Læsø. Three of them were wrecked.
Unnamed	United Kingdom	The brig was driven ashore on Læsø. Her crew survived with frostbite. She was on a voyage from Saint Petersburg to Whitby.

=== 4 December ===
List of shipwrecks: 4 December 1803
Ship	State	Description
Unnamed	United Kingdom	The brig ran aground on the Herd Sand, in the North Sea off the coast of County Durham. She was refloated on 6 December and taken in to South Shields.

=== 5 December ===
List of shipwrecks: 5 December 1803
Ship	State	Description
HMS Avenger	Royal Navy	The sloop-of-war was wrecked in the Heligoland Bight at the mouth of the Weser. All 80 of her crew were rescued.
Lilly	United States	The ship was wrecked at Abacoa, Spanish Florida while on a voyage from Georgia to Nassau, Bahamas.
Marquis of Huntley	United Kingdom	The ship ran aground on the Herd Sand, in the North Sea off the coast of County Durham. She was refloated on 16 December and taken in to South Shields.

=== 6 December ===
List of shipwrecks: 6 December 1803
Ship	State	Description
Copenhagen	Denmark–Norway	The ship was wrecked off Calais, France. She was on a voyage from Copenhagen to Saint Croix.
President	United States	The ship was wrecked at Boulogne, Pas-de-Calais, France while on a voyage from Amsterdam, North Holland, Batavian Republic to Baltimore, Maryland.

=== 9 December ===
List of shipwrecks: 9 December 1803
Ship	State	Description
Mary	United Kingdom	The ship departed from Newfoundland, British North America. No further trace, presumed foundered with the loss of all hands.
Nile	United Kingdom	The brig was driven ashore at North Somercotes, Lincolnshire. She was on a voyage from London to Leeds, Yorkshire.
Testimony	United Kingdom	The ship departed from Liverpool, Lancashire for Teignmouth, Devon. No further trace, presumed foundered with the loss of all hands.
Five unnamed vessels	Flags unknown	The ships were driven ashore between Calais and Gravelines, Nord, France.
Unnamed	United States	The ship was driven ashore between Calais and Gravelines.

=== 10 December ===
List of shipwrecks: 10 December 1803
Ship	State	Description
Attempt	United Kingdom	The brig foundered in the English Channel off Rye, Sussex. Her crew were rescued. She was on a voyage from London to Rye.
Ceres	United Kingdom	The brig sprang a leak in the North Sea and was beached at Whitby, Yorkshire, where she was wrecked.
Daking	United Kingdom	The ship was driven ashore and wrecked at Littlehampton, Sussex. She was on a voyage from Newcastle upon Tyne, Northumberland to Littlehampton.
Delight	United Kingdom	The ship was wrecked in the North Sea off Lowestoft, Suffolk. Her crew were rescued.
Eagle	United Kingdom	The ship was driven ashore at Sunderland, County Durham. She was refloated on 15 December but then foundered.
Elizabeth	United Kingdom	The ship was driven ashore near St Austell, Cornwall. She was on a voyage from London to São Miguel Island, Azores. Elizabeth was later refloated and taken into Charlestown, Cornwall.
La Concorde	France	The ship was wrecked at Elmer, Sussex, United Kingdom with the loss of all hands. She was on a voyage from Bayonne, Basses-Pyrénées to Antwerp, Deux-Nèthes.
Maria	Rostock	The ship was last sighted on this date. She was on a voyage from Rostock to London.
HMS Minx	Royal Navy	The Archer-class gun-brig was driven ashore at Dover, Kent. Her crew were rescued. She was refloated five or six days later.
Reward	United Kingdom	The ship was wrecked at Blakeney, Norfolk. Her crew were rescued.
HMS Shannon	Royal Navy	HMS Shannon. War of the Third Coalition: The frigate ran aground on Tatihou, Manche, France. She was set afire the next day to prevent her capture by the French. Her crew were taken prisoner.
Tradesman	United Kingdom	The ship foundered in the North Sea off Spurn Point, Yorkshire with the loss of all hands. She was on a voyage from Blakeney, Norfolk to Wakefield, Yorkshire.
Unnamed	United Kingdom	The ship foundered in the English Channel off Rustington, Sussex. Her crew were rescued.
Unnamed	United Kingdom	The sloop was driven ashore at Lindisfarne, Northumberland.

=== 11 December ===
List of shipwrecks: 11 December 1803
Ship	State	Description
Molly	United States	The brig was wrecked at Currituck, North Carolina with the loss of 24 lives. She was on a voyage from Jamaica to Norfolk, Virginia.

=== 12 December ===
List of shipwrecks: 12 December 1803
Ship	State	Description
Maria	United Kingdom	The ship was wrecked on the Sunk Sand, in the North Sea off Great Yarmouth, Norfolk while on a voyage from Dundee, Forfarshire to London.

=== 14 December ===
List of shipwrecks: December 1803
Ship	State	Description
Grenada	United Kingdom	The sloop was lost at Cowes, Isle of Wight.

=== 15 December ===
List of shipwrecks: 15 December 1803
Ship	State	Description
Enterprize	United Kingdom	The ship foundered in the Atlantic Ocean. Her crew were rescued by Maria (United Kingdom). Enterprize was on a voyage from Newfoundland, British North America to Ireland.
Hamburgh Packet	United Kingdom	The ship foundered in the North Sea 4 nautical miles (7.4 km) west of East Haven, Forfarshire with the loss of all hands. She was on a voyage from Danzig to London.
Jane	United Kingdom	The sloop was in collision with Scorpion (United Kingdom) off St Davids Head, Pembrokeshire and foundered. Her crew were rescued by Scorpion. Jane was on a voyage from Liverpool, Lancashire to Cork.
Roden	United Kingdom	The ship struck a rock and foundered in Blacksod Bay.
Scipio	United Kingdom	The ship was driven ashore on the Horse Shoe Reef, Virginia, United States.
Society	United Kingdom	The brig was driven ashore 3 nautical miles (5.6 km) west of Arbroath, Forfarshire. Her crew were rescued.
Three Sisters	United Kingdom	The snow was driven ashore at Lurgan, County Armagh.

=== 16 December ===
List of shipwrecks: 16 December 1803
Ship	State	Description
Antelope	United Kingdom	The schooner was driven ashore and wrecked at Montrose, Forfarshire. Her crew were rescued.
Christian	United Kingdom	The ship foundered off Ballagan, County Armagh.
John	United Kingdom	The ship was driven ashore and wrecked at Montrose with the loss of six of her nine crew.
King George	United Kingdom	The ship was driven ashore and wrecked at Hamilton Point, County Armagh.
Polly	United Kingdom	The ship was driven ashore and wrecked at East Haven, Forfarshire with the loss of all hands.
Providence	United Kingdom	The ship sank at Dublin. She was on a voyage from Liverpool, Lancashire to Wexford.
Tagus	United Kingdom	The ship was wrecked at Whiteness, Shetland Islands with the loss of all hands.
Tar	United Kingdom	The ship was wrecked at Carn Point, County Wexford while on a voyage from Liverpool, Lancashire to London. Her crew were rescued.
Thomas	United Kingdom	The brig was driven ashore at Nigg, Aberdeenshire and wrecked with the loss of seven of her eleven crew.
Waedewit	Prussia	The ship was driven ashore and wrecked at Cowie, Aberdeenshire with the loss of seven of her fourteen crew. She was on a voyage from Saint-Martin-de-Ré, Morbihan, France to a Baltic port.

=== 17 December ===
List of shipwrecks: 17 December 1803
Ship	State	Description
Hornby	United Kingdom	The ship was driven ashore at Marsh Chapel, Lincolnshire. Her crew were rescued. She was on a voyage from Riga, Russia to Hull, Yorkshire. She was refloated in August 1804 and taken into Grimsby, Lincolnshire.

=== 18 December ===
List of shipwrecks: 18 December 1803
Ship	State	Description
Maria Magdalena	Sweden	The brig was driven ashore at Flamborough Head, Yorkshire, United Kingdom and was wrecked. She was of a voyage from Gävle to Marseille, Bouches-du-Rhône, France. Her crew were rescued.

=== 19 December ===
List of shipwrecks: 19 December 1803
Ship	State	Description
Christiana	United Kingdom	The ship was driven ashore at Rattray Head, Aberdeenshire with the loss of five of her 24 crew. She broke up the next day.
New Draper	United Kingdom	The ship was driven ashore and wrecked at Selsey, Sussex. She was on a voyage from Newry, County Antrim to London.
Robert	United Kingdom	The snow was driven ashore at Ruswick Bay, Yorkshire devoid of crew. She was on a voyage from Danzig to London.
Four unnamed vessels	French Navy	War of the Third Coalition: The gunboats were driven ashore near Gravelines, Nord in an action with HM Hired armed lugger Speculator (Royal Navy). Two wereb wrecked, two were refloated.

=== 20 December ===
List of shipwrecks: 20 December 1803
Ship	State	Description
Antelope	United Kingdom	The ship was driven ashore at Montrose, Forfarshire. Her crew were rescued.
Copelin	United Kingdom	The ship was driven ashore near Cork.
Good Hope, or Good Intent	Hamburg	The ship was wrecked at "Neiss", Shetland Islands, United Kingdom. She was on a voyage from Tönningen, Duchy of Schleswig to Cádiz, Spain.
Nancy	United Kingdom	The brig foundered in the North Sea south of Arbroath, Forfarshire.
New Greenwich	United Kingdom	The ship, a brig or brigantine, was driven ashore south of Bervie, Aberdeenshire and wrecked with the loss of all hands.
Providence	United Kingdom	The ship was driven ashore at Great Yarmouth, Norfolk. Her crew were rescued. She was on a voyage from London to Great Yarmouth.
Vrouw Gesina	Grand Duchy of Oldenburg	The ship was driven ashore at Great Yarmouth. Her crew were rescued. She was on a voyage from Waarl to London.
Vrouw Margaretta	Grand Duchy of Oldenburg	The ship was driven ashore at Great Yarmouth. Her crew were rescued. She was on a voyage from Waarl to London.

=== 21 December ===
List of shipwrecks: 21 December 1803
Ship	State	Description
Ariel	United Kingdom	The ship was driven ashore and wrecked at Hallyhole, Northumberland. She was on a voyage from Memel, Prussia to Sunderland, County Durham.
Harmony	United States	The ship was driven ashore near King's Lynn, Norfolk, United Kingdom. She was on a voyage from Emden, Prussia to Baltimore, Maryland.
Krageroe	Denmark	The ship was wrecked on Housay, Shetland Islands, United Kingdom. Her crew survived.

=== 22 December ===
List of shipwrecks: 22 December 1803
Ship	State	Description
Hunter	United Kingdom	The ship was driven ashore near Wexford. She was on a voyage from Greenock, Renfrewshire to the West Indies
Nancy and Katty	Sweden	The ship was driven ashore and wrecked at Rattray Head, Aberdeenshire, United Kingdom. Her crew were rescued.

=== 23 December ===
List of shipwrecks: 23 December 1803
Ship	State	Description
Hunter	United Kingdom	The ship was driven ashore and wrecked at Greenock, Renfrewshire. Her crew were rescued. She was on a voyage from Greenock to Jamaica
Mary	United Kingdom	The ship was driven ashore at Black Dog, Aberdeenshire. Six crew were rescued, four having been lost before she came ashore. She was on a voyage from Memel, Prussia to London.

=== 24 December ===
List of shipwrecks: 24 December 1803
Ship	State	Description
Neta Henderika	Prussia	The ship was driven ashore near Southwold, Suffolk, United Kingdom.
Thomas	United Kingdom	The collier foundered in the North Sea off Great Yarmouth, Norfolk. Her crew were rescued

=== 25 December ===
List of shipwrecks: 25 December 1803
Ship	State	Description
Britannia	United Kingdom	The ship was severely damaged in a gale at Portsmouth, Hampshire.
British Tar	United Kingdom	The ship was driven ashore and severely damaged at Turnchapel, Devon. She was refloated.
Caroline	United Kingdom	The ship was severely damaged in a gale at Portsmouth.
Catherine and Mary	United Kingdom	The privateer, a schooner, foundered in the Cattewater.
Cosmopolitan	United Kingdom	The privateer was wrecked at Plymouth, Devon.
Duke of York	United Kingdom	The ship was driven ashore in Stoke's Bay and severely damaged in a gale. She was refloated and taken in to Portsmouth.
Eagle	United Kingdom	The ship was severely damaged in a gale at Portsmouth.
Fortuna	United Kingdom	The ship was driven ashore and severely damaged in a gale at Portsmouth.
Jean	United Kingdom	The ship was severely damaged in a gale at Portsmouth.
Les Amis or Les Deux Amis	France	War of the Third Coalition: The ship, a prize of HMS Malta (Royal Navy), was wrecked in the Cattewater. She had been on a voyage from Martinique to Bordeaux, Gironde.
Lord Duncan	United Kingdom	The ship was severely damaged in a gale at Portsmouth.
Lord Lenox	United Kingdom	The schooner was severely damaged in a gale at Portsmouth.
Matthew	United Kingdom	The ship was severely damaged in a gale at Portsmouth.
Pitt	United Kingdom	The sloop foundered in Stokes Bay. Her crew were rescued. She was refloated on 6 January 1804 and taken in to Cowes, Isle of Wight.
Recovery	United Kingdom	The ship was severely damaged in a gale at Portsmouth.
Samuel	United Kingdom	The ship was driven ashore in Stoke's Bay and severely damaged in a gale.
Seaflower	United Kingdom	The brig was driven ashore at Plymouth. She was refloated.
Spy	United Kingdom	The ship was severely damaged in a gale at Portsmouth.
HMS Suffisante	Royal Navy	The sloop-of-war foundered at Cork with the loss of ten of her crew.
Thomas	United Kingdom	The ship was driven ashore and severely damaged at Turnchapel. She was refloated.
Townsend	United Kingdom	The West Indiaman was driven ashore and wrecked at Southsea Castle, Hampshire. She was on a voyage from London to Dominica.
Trinidad	United Kingdom	The ship was severely damaged in a gale at Portsmouth.
Unity	United Kingdom	The ship was driven ashore and wrecked in Deadman's Bay while on a voyage from Jersey, Channel Islands to Liverpool, Lancashire. Her crew were rescued.
Unnamed	French Navy	War of the Third Coalition: The gunboat, a prize of HMS Basilisk (Royal Navy) was driven ashore at Dover, Kent with the loss of eleven lives.

=== 26 December ===
List of shipwrecks: 26 December 1803
Ship	State	Description
Kindero	Russia	The ship was driven ashore at West Hoe, Devon, United Kingdom. She was refloated and taken in to the Catwater.
Thomas	United Kingdom	The brig was driven ashore at Nigg, Aberdeenshire and was wrecked with the loss of seven of her eleven crew.
Unnamed	United Kingdom	The ship was driven ashore at the mouth of the River North Esk. Her six crew were rescued.
Unnamed	Flag unknown	The ship was driven ashore and wrecked at Usan, Forfarshire, United Kingdom with the loss of all hands.
Unnamed	Flag unknown	The ship was driven ashore and wrecked in Lunan Bay with the loss of all but three of her crew.

=== 27 December ===
List of shipwrecks: 27 December 1803
Ship	State	Description
Ariel	United Kingdom	The ship was driven ashore crewless and wrecked 3 nautical miles (5.6 km) north of Berwick upon Tweed.
Earl of Wycombe	United Kingdom	The ship departed from Halifax, Nova Scotia, British North America for Liverpool, Lancashire. No further trace, presumed foundered in the Atlantic Ocean with the loss of all hands.
Mary	United Kingdom	The ship was wrecked near Glendore, County Cork. All on board were rescued. She was on a voyage from Bristol, Gloucestershire to Charleston, South Carolina, United States.
HMS Princess	Royal Navy	The frigate was driven ashore on the Cheshire bank of the River Mersey.

=== 29 December ===
List of shipwrecks: 29 December 1803
Ship	State	Description
Junge Carr	Wismar	The ship was driven ashore on "Rounen", Norway. She was on a voyage from Hull, Yorkshire, United Kingdom to Wismar. She was refloated and taken in to "Egwood", Norway.
Polly	United Kingdom	The ship was driven ashore and wrecked at Portland, Dorset while on a voyage from Newfoundland, British North America to Poole, Dorset.

=== 30 December ===
List of shipwrecks: 30 December 1803
Ship	State	Description
Grappler	Royal Navy	En route from Guernsey to Granville, Manche on the 23 December, the Courser-class gun-brig sought shelter off the island of Maitre, one of the Îles Chausey. The storm abated on 30 December, but on leaving the anchorage a hawser parted and HMS Grappler drifted on to a half-tide rock, breaking in two as the tide dropped. Her crew were taken as prisoners of war.

=== Unknown date ===
List of shipwrecks: Unknown date in December 1803
Ship	State	Description
Adriana	Prussia	The ship was lost at the mouth of the Ems.
Albion	United Kingdom	The ship was driven ashore at Dunbar, Lothian. She was on a voyage from Pillau, Prussia to London.
Alert	United Kingdom	The ship was driven ashore on the Scottish coast while on a voyage from Memel, Prussia to South Shields, County Durham.
Alexander	Russia	The ship was driven ashore near Calais, France. She was on a voyage from Saint Petersburg to London.
Alexander	United Kingdom	The ship was driven ashore near Leigh-on-Sea, Essex.
Alexander	United Kingdom	The ship was driven ashore on Læso. She was on a voyage from Saint Petersburg to London.
Ann	United Kingdom	The ship was driven ashore at Paull, Yorkshire.
Ann	United Kingdom	The ship was lost on the Norwegian coast. She was on a voyage from Riga, Russia to Liverpool, Lancashire.
Anna	Russia	The ship was wrecked on the coast of Norfolk, United Kingdom. She was on a voyage from Saint Petersburg to La Rochelle, Charente-Maritime.
Anna Maria	United Kingdom	The ship was wrecked near Dublin. Her crew were rescued. She was on a voyage from Cádiz, Spain to Dublin.
Anna Mathilda	Flag unknown	The ship was driven ashore and wrecked at "Sololilza" with the loss of a crew member.
Aphrodite	Prussia	The ship was driven ashore near Calais. She was on a voyage from Emden to Bordeaux, Gironde, France.
Atlas	United Kingdom	The ship was driven ashore and wrecked at "Sololilza". Her crew were rescued.
Bayomaire	France	War of the Third Coalition: The privateer was driven ashore on the French coast in an engagement with HMS Ardent (Royal Navy) and was destroyed by her crew.
Betsey	United Kingdom	The ship was wrecked near Dunkirk, Nord, France. She was on a voyage from Amsterdam, North Holland, Batavian Republic to Boston, Lincolnshire.
Betsey	United Kingdom	The brig was wrecked near Arbroath, Forfarshire with the loss of all hands.
Boerse	Lübeck	The ship was driven ashore near Lübeck while on a voyage from Liverpool to Lübeck.
Bristol	United Kingdom	The ship was driven ashore and wrecked at "Annarey", County Antrim. She was on a voyage from Lisbon, Portugal to Liverpool.
Britannia	United Kingdom	The ship was driven ashore near Waterford. She was on a voyage from Ipswich, Suffolk to Liverpool.
Carl	Duchy of Holstein	The ship was driven ashore near Calais. She was on a voyage from Tonningen to Charleston, South Carolina, United States.
Carolina Frederica	Stettin	The ship was driven ashore and wrecked at Bullers Buchan, Aberdeenshire, United Kingdom. Her crew were rescued. She was on a voyage from Stettin to London.
Centaurus	(United Kingdom of Great Britain and Ireland) Guernsey	The ship was wrecked on the coast of France. She was on a voyage from Rotterdam, South Holland, Batavian Republic to Guernsey.
Charlotte	United Kingdom	The ship was driven ashore near "Alemouth". She was on a voyage from Saint Petersburg to Dundee, Forfarshire.
Charlotte	United Kingdom	The ship was driven ashore in the "Termensickin River", Ireland.
HMS Chiffonne	Royal Navy	The Heureuse-class frigate ran aground off the coast of Norway and was severely damaged. She was refloated and taken in to Sheerness, Kent for repairs.
Clyde	United Kingdom	The sloop was driven ashore and wrecked on Islay. She was on a voyage from Saltcoats, Ayrshire to an Irish port.
Commerce	United States	The ship was driven ashore on Goree, Zeeland, Batavian Republic.
Concord	United Kingdom	The ship was driven ashore and wrecked at Holyhead, Anglesey. She was on a voyage from Youghal, County Cork to Liverpool.
Cornelia Eleonora	Lübeck	The ship was wrecked on Læsø. She was on a voyage from Hull, Yorkshire, United Kingdom to Lübeck.
Cotton Planter	United Kingdom	The ship was driven ashore near King's Lynn, Norfolk. She was on a voyage from Saint Petersburg to London.
Diana	United States	The ship was wrecked on the Ooster Sand, off Schouwen, Zeeland, Batavian Republic. She was on a voyage from Baltimore, Maryland to Amsterdam, North Holland, Batavian Republic.
Diligent	United Kingdom	The ship was wrecked on the Dutch coast. She was on a voyage from Saint Petersburg to Barcelona, Spain.
Dorothea	United Kingdom	The ship was driven ashore on Læsø and was wrecked.
Eagle	United States	The ship was driven ashore on Goree.
Echo	United Kingdom	The ship was driven ashore near Flastrand, on the coast of Jutland. Her crew were rescued. She was on a voyage from Saint Petersburg to Rochester, Kent.
Fame	United Kingdom	Captain Thompson's ship was wrecked at Drogheda, County Louth. She was on a voyage from Waterford to Liverpool.
Fame	(United Kingdom of Great Britain and Ireland) Guernsey	Captain Yeats's ship was driven ashore near Drogheda.
Flora	United Kingdom	The ship was wrecked at Portland, Dorset with the loss of three lives. She was on a voyage from Newfoundland to Poole, Dorset.
Frederika	Prussia	The ship was wrecked on Saltholm, Denmark. She was on a voyage from Memel to London.
Friends	United Kingdom	The brig was wrecked at Balbriggan, County Dublin with the loss of three of her crew.
Friends	United Kingdom	The ship was driven ashore between Dundalk and Drogheda, County Louth.
General Johnson	United Kingdom	The ship was driven ashore and wrecked at Balbriggan, County Dublin.
Hector	United Kingdom	The ship was driven ashore and wrecked near Wexford.
Houghton	United Kingdom	The ship foundered on a voyage from Canton to Bombay.
Jane and Bella	United Kingdom	The ship was wrecked on the North Bull, in the Irish Sea off the coast of County Dublin with the loss of all hands.
Jeannie	United Kingdom	The sloop foundered in the Irish Sea 3 nautical miles (5.6 km) off the Point of Ayre, Isle of Man. Her crew were rescued. She was on a voyage from Whitehaven, Lancashire to Peel, Isle of Man.
Juno	United Kingdom	The ship was driven ashore at Grimsby, Lincolnshire while on a voyage from Memel to Liverpool. Her crew were rescued.
Katty	United Kingdom	The ship was driven ashore on the Isle of Man. She was on a voyage from Limerick to Liverpool.
Kelly	United Kingdom	The ship was driven ashore on the coast of the Isle of Man while on a voyage from Limerick to Liverpool.
Kron Prince	Prussia	The ship was wrecked at Dublin.
Lady Saltoun	United Kingdom	The sloop foundered in the North Sea off Stonehaven, Aberdeenshire. Her wreck came ashore at Belhelvie, Aberdeenshire.
Loftus	Batavian Republic	The ship was wrecked on the Portuguese coast with the loss of over 300 lives. She was on a voyage from Demerara to Amsterdam, North Holland.
London Packet	United Kingdom	The ship was driven ashore and wrecked on the Isle of Portland, Dorset.
Lune	United Kingdom	The ship was driven ashore near Dublin. She was on a voyage from London to Dublin.
Lytiskier	Sweden	The ship was driven ashore near "Alemouth". She was on a voyage from Stockholm to London.
Maria	United Kingdom	The ship was driven ashore at Paull. She was on a voyage from Narva, Russia to Hull, Yorkshire.
Martha Magdalena	Sweden	The ship was wrecked off Flamborough Head. She was on a voyage from Gefle to Hull.
Mary	United Kingdom	The ship was wrecked on the Portuguese coast while on a voyage from Cork to Lisbon.
Mary	United Kingdom	The ship was lost in Dublin Bay. Her crew were rescued.
Mercury	United Kingdom	The ship was driven ashore on Saaremaa.
Mayflower	United Kingdom	The ship was driven ashore at South Shields, County Durham.
New Draper	United Kingdom	The ship was driven ashore and wrecked near Chichester, Sussex.
Norske Lowe	Denmark–Norway	The ship foundered in the English Channel off Boulogne, Pas-de-Calais, France. Her crew were rescued. She was on a voyage from Guernsey, Channel Islands to Dort, Batavian Republic.
Peggy	United Kingdom	The ship sank at Waterford. She was on a voyage from Newport, Monmouthshire to Carmarthen.
Peggy	United Kingdom	The ship was driven ashore at Wexford. She was on a voyage from Greenock to Wexford.
Peggy	United Kingdom	The ship ran aground on the "Trindell". She floated off and was driven ashore at Castle Point. She was refloated and taken in to Copenhagen.
Phœnix	United Kingdom	The ship was wrecked on the coast of Norway. Her crew were rescued.
Pomona	Flag unknown	The ship was driven ashore near "Sololilza". Her crew were rescued.
Pursuit	United Kingdom	The ship was wrecked on the Aberdeenshire coast 17 nautical miles (31 km) north of Aberdeen with the loss of four of her crew. She was on a voyage from London to Kiel, Duchy of Holstein.
Retrieve	United Kingdom	The ship was driven ashore on Læsø. She was refloated in May 1804 and take into Aalborg.
Robert	United Kingdom	The ship foundered in the Baltic or North Sea. Her crew were rescued.
Roebuck	United Kingdom	The ship was driven ashore in Holy Loch. She was on a voyage from Whitehaven, Cumberland to the Clyde.
Rolina	Batavian Republic	The ship was driven ashore near Calais. She was on a voyage from the Vlie to Saint-Vaast-la-Hougue, Manche, France.
Rover	United Kingdom	The ship was wrecked in Black Sod Bay, County Donegal. She was on a voyage from Saint Petersburg to Dublin.
Ruby	United Kingdom	The ship was driven ashore at "Sololilza". Her crew were rescued.
Shakespear	United Kingdom	The ship was wrecked on the Norwegian coast. She was on a voyage from Saint Petersburg to Liverpool.
Sojus	United Kingdom	The ship was driven ashore at "Sololilza". Her crew were rescued.
St Juan Baptista	Spain	The ship foundered off the North Foreland, Kent. Her crew were rescued. She was on a voyage from Deva to London.
Surprise	France	The schooner was wrecked in the Sister Islands, Tasmania with some loss of life.
Surprize	United Kingdom	The ship was driven ashore near Flamborough Head, Yorkshire. She was on a voyage from Lübeck to London. Surprize was later refloated and taken into Bridlington, Yorkshire.
Sutton	United Kingdom	The ship was wrecked at Dublin.
Swallow	United Kingdom	The ship was driven ashore near Dundalk. Her crew were rescued. She was on a voyage from Lisbon to Greenock.
Swift	United Kingdom	The ship was wrecked on the coast of Sussex. She was on a voyage from Southampton, Hampshire to Newhaven, Sussex.
Thomas	United Kingdom	The ship was driven ashore and wrecked at Lowestoft, Suffolk. she was on a voyage from Newcastle upon Tyne to London.
Three Gebroeders	Prussia	The ship was driven ashore on Eierland, North Holland, Batavian Republic. She was on a voyage from Emden to Amsterdam.
Triumph	Prussia	The ship was driven ashore near Katwijjk, South Holland, Batavian Republic.
Two Gebroeders	Duchy of Holstein	The ship was lost whilst on a voyage from Tonningen to London.
Vesser's Hope	United Kingdom	The ship was lost near Whitehaven. Her crew were rescued She was on a voyage from Liverpool to Whitehaven.
Vreede	Batavian Republic	The ship foundered in the English Channel off Guernsey, Channel Islands with the loss of all hands. She was on a voyage from Rotterdam, South Holland to Bilbao, Spain.
Vrow Cornelia	Flag unknown	The ship was wrecked at Barton on Sea, Hampshire.
Vrow Gesina	Duchy of Holstein	The ship was wrecked on a sandbank off Great Yarmouth, Norfolk. She was on a voyage from Oldenburg to London.
Vrow Margaretta	Duchy of Holstein	The ship was wrecked on a sandbank off Great Yarmouth. She was on a voyage from Oldenburg to London.
William	United Kingdom	The ship was driven ashore in the "Termensickin River", Ireland. She was on a voyage from Ayr to Glasgow, Renfrewshire.
Unnamed	United Kingdom	The ship was driven ashore at Theddlethorpe, Lincolnshire. Her crew were rescued.
Unnamed	United Kingdom	The ship was driven ashore at Grainthorpe, Lincolnshire. Her crew were rescued.
Unnamed	Prussia	The ship foundered off the coast of Lincolnshire with the loss of all eleven crew.

== Unknown date ==
List of shipwrecks: Unknown date in 1803
Ship	State	Description
Adamant	United Kingdom	The ship was abandoned in the Atlantic Ocean. Her crew were rescued by an American vessel. She was on a voyage from Quebec, Lower Canada, British North America to London.
Adventure	United States	The ship was wrecked in the Abaco Islands. She was on a voyage from Charleston, South Carolina to Havana, Cuba.
Adventure	United Kingdom	The ship ran aground at Quebec City.
Ajax	British East India Company	The East Indiaman was lost in the Bengal River with the loss of thirteen of her crew.
Alice	United States	The ship was wrecked at Antigua. She was on a voyage from New York to Antigua.
Astrea	United Kingdom	The whaler was wrecked on the Island of Desolation, South Shetland Islands with some loss of life.
Barbadoes Planter	United Kingdom	War of the Third Coalition: The ship was captured off Tobago by a French privateer and was burnt. She was on a voyage from Tobago to London.
Betsey	United Kingdom	The ship was wrecked on the North Cape, Cape Breton Island, British North America. She was on a voyage from Quebec to Trinidad.
Britannia	United Kingdom	The ship was lost on the Florida Keys. she was on a voyage from Jamaica to London.
Catharine	United Kingdom	The ship was driven ashore and wrecked at Tobago.
Ceres	United Kingdom	War of the Third Coalition: The ship was captured and sunk by the privateer Bellona (France). She was on a voyage from Newfoundland, British North America to London.
City of Amsterdam	Batavian Republic	The ship was lost at Curaçao with the loss of five of her crew.
Consolante	French Navy	The Consolante-class frigate foundered off Margarita Island.
Dispatch	United Kingdom	The ship was lost off Cuba. She was on a voyage from Jamaica to Cork.
Dreadnought	United Kingdom	The former fourth rate foundered in the English Channel 3 leagues (9 nautical miles (17 km)) south of North Foreland, Kent.
Duke of Leeds	United Kingdom	The ship struck a rock and foundered off St. Andrew, New Brunswick, British North America. Her crew were rescued. She was on a voyage from Liverpool, Lancashire to New Brunswick.
Eagle	United States	The ship was wrecked near Cape Henry, Virginia. She was on a voyage from Guadeloupe to Norfolk, Virginia.
Earl St. Vincent	United Kingdom	The ship was wrecked on the Gold Coast, Africa.
Enterprize	United Kingdom	The ship foundered in the Atlantic Ocean. Her crew were rescued. she was on a voyage from Newfoundland to an Irish port.
Fancy	United Kingdom	The ship was lost near New Providence, New Jersey, United States.
General Abercrombie	United Kingdom	The ship was lost at Saint Croix, Virgin Islands before 22 April. She was on a voyage from Africa to the West Indies.
Golden Grove	United Kingdom	The ship was lost whilst on a voyage from Halifax, Nova Scotia, British North America to the West Indies.
Goodhope	United Kingdom	The brig was wrecked at Barbados.
Hebe	United Kingdom	The ship foundered. She was on a voyage from the Clyde to "Pictow".
Henry Dundas	United Kingdom	The East Indiaman was lost in the Bengal River. She was on a voyage from Madras and Bengal, India to London.
Hope	United Kingdom	The ship, with Dennison, master, was lost in the Bay of Bengal. She was on a voyage from Bombay to Bengal
Joseph	United States	The ship was lost whilst on a voyage from Antwerp, Deux-Nèthes, France to Philadelphia, Pennsylvania.
Kate	United Kingdom	The ship was lost off Trinidada.
La Julie	France	The ship was destroyed by fire at Saint-Domingue.
Les Deux Amis	France	The prize ship was wrecked at Bonny, Nigeria. Her crew were rescued by Diligent (United Kingdom) and L'Oliveire (France).
Lion	United Kingdom	The ship was lost whilst on a voyage from Tortola to Saint Thomas and Curaçao and return.
L. L.	France	The ship was lost at Montserrat. She was on a voyage from Martinique to Guadeloupe and Antwerp.
Lune	United Kingdom	The ship ran aground off Jamaica. She was on a voyage from Jamaica to Portsmouth, Hampshire. She was refloated and resumed her voyage.
Maria	United Kingdom	The ship was wrecked on the coast of East Florida. She was on a voyage from British Honduras to Charleston, South Carolina.
Maria	Spain	The ship was lost in the Gulf of Mexico. She was on a voyage from Bilbao to Veracruz, Viceroyalty of New Granada.
Marquês Marialva	Portugal	The ship was lost in the Mozambique Channel.
Mary	United Kingdom	The ship was lost near Point des Monts, in the Saint Lawrence River.
Nile	United Kingdom	The ship foundered in the Baltic Sea with the loss of her captain.
Nostra Señora del Carmen	Spain	The ship was lost in the Gulf of Mexico. She was on a voyage from Cádiz to Veracruz, Viceroyalty of New Granada.
Nostra Señora del Carmen	Spain	The ship was lost near Montevideo, Viceroyalty of the Río de la Plata. She was on a voyage from St. Andero to Montevideo.
Phœbus	United States	The schooner was wrecked at Saint Augustine, East Florida.
Phœnix	United Kingdom	The ship was driven ashore on Long Island, New York, United States. She was on a voyage from the Clyde to Quebec City.
Pointer	United Kingdom	The ship was driven ashore on Grenada. She was on a voyage from Tobago to London.
Providence	United Kingdom	The ship was wrecked on Red Island, in the Saint Lawrence River.
Romulus	United Kingdom	The ship struck a rock in Tyrrell's Bay, Tobago and was beached. She was consequently condemned.
Sally	United Kingdom	The ship was lost near Angustura, on the Spanish Main. She was on a voyage from London to Demerara
Sisters	United Kingdom	The ship was lost at Port Royal, Jamaica.
St. Juan	Spain	The slave ship was taken over by the slaves, who murdered most of her crew. She was subsequently wrecked at Rigo Pongos, on the African coast.
Stork	United Kingdom	The ship was wrecked off Newfoundland. She was on a voyage from Copenhagen to Saint Croix.
St Peter	Prussia	The ship was lost whilst on a voyage from London to Emden.
Tamer	United Kingdom	The ship foundered off Barbados. Her crew were rescued by her prize, Braave (France). She was on a voyage from Africa to the West Indies.
Triumph	Batavian Republic	The ship was lost at the mouth of the Orinoco. She was on a voyage from the Orinoco to Amsterdam.
Undaunted	United Kingdom	The ship ran aground on the Colorados, off the coast of Cuba. She was on a voyage from Jamaica to London. Undaunted was later refloated and put into New York, where she arrived on 20 June.
HMS Victorious	Royal Navy	The Culloden-class ship of the line was beached in the Tagus, being severely leaky. She was consequently condemned and broken up.
Virginia	United States	The ship was lost south of Sandy Hook, New Jersey. She was on a voyage from London to New York.
Windsor Castle	United Kingdom	The ship foundered off Bermuda. Her crew were rescued by Eliza (United Kingdom). Windsor Castle was on a voyage from St Thomas to Liverpool.
