= Transport vessels for the British expedition to Balambangan Island (1803) =

In 1803, in response to the restitution of the Moluccas to the Dutch as per the Treaty of Amiens of 1802, Lord Wellesley, Governor-General of India, decided upon the resettlement of Balambangan Island, and instructed R. J. Farquhar, the British Resident at Amboina for the British East India Company (EIC), to manage the expedition.

Farquhar reestablished the settlement at Balambangan by the end of September 1803. The resumption of war with France led the EIC to abandon the island in 1805.

HCS Mornington, under the command of Captain W. J. Hamilton, a 24-gun sloop-of-war of the Bombay Marine, the EIC's naval arm, was the sole warship of the expedition.

Vessel	Master	Notes
Anstruther	William Richardson	Armed ship; wrecked on 22 or 23 September off the coast of Banggi Island whilst en route from Malacca to Balambangan
Thornhill	Graham	Wrecked on 22 or 23 September off the coast of Banggi Island whilst en route from Malacca to Balambangan
General Baird	W.Fleming	Destroyed by fire in the settlement's harbour on 29 October.
Balambangan		Company ship?
Commerce		Armed ship?
		Four transports
