= Orange Grove (ship) =

Several vessels have been named Orange Grove:

- Orange Grove (1790 ship) was launched in 1790 at Liverpool. She made two complete voyages as a slave ship in the triangular trade in enslaved people. She became a West Indiaman, but the French Navy captured her in 1794.
- Orange Grove (1800 ship) was probably of Danish origin. She first appeared in British records in 1800. She made one complete voyage as a slave ship in the triangular trade in enslaved people. The French captured her in 1804 during her second slave trading voyage after she had embarked slaves but before she could land them in the West Indies.
