= Betsey (schooner) =

History

United Kingdom
- Name: Betsey
- Fate: Wrecked 21 November 1805

General characteristics
- Class & type: Schooner
- Tons burthen: 75 tons bm
- Complement: 12

Betsey was a schooner of 75 tons that was wrecked in the South China Sea in 1805 while en route to the newly established penal colony of New South Wales.

Betsey departed Macau on 10 November 1805, heading for Sydney in New South Wales. Her crew comprised two officers, Captain William Brooks and chief mate Edward Luttrell, and ten seaman including four from China, three from the Philippines and three from Portugal.

At 2.30 AM on 21 November 1805 Betsey struck a reef. For three days the crew struggled to refloat their stricken vessel before abandoning her. Brooks, Luttrell, and three Portuguese crew climbed into the jollyboat and the remaining crew abandoned the ship on a raft. The jollyboat and raft planned to travel together but a strong wind parted them. The raft and its crew were never seen again. The jollyboat reached Balambangan Island off the North Coast of Borneo and the crew landed on 2 December. There 11 natives attacked them. Brooks died after having had both legs cut off. One of the Portuguese crew was severely wounded as he made his way back to the boat; he died in the boat. Lutterell fought off the attackers and with the remaining two Portuguese headed back out to sea. On 15 December the three men approached some new islands where they hoped to replenish their food supplies. As they were planning to land three Malay prows attacked them. The Malays succeeded in spearing and killing one Portuguese, and wounding the other. Their attackers captured both Lutterell and the surviving crew member and kept them as slaves. They were entirely naked and lived off sago. On 20 April 1806 their captors put Lutterell and the Portuguese sailor aboard a prow, took them to Singapore, and released them. Both made it back to Malacca.
