= Balambangan Island =

Island in Kudat Division, Sabah, eastern Malaysia

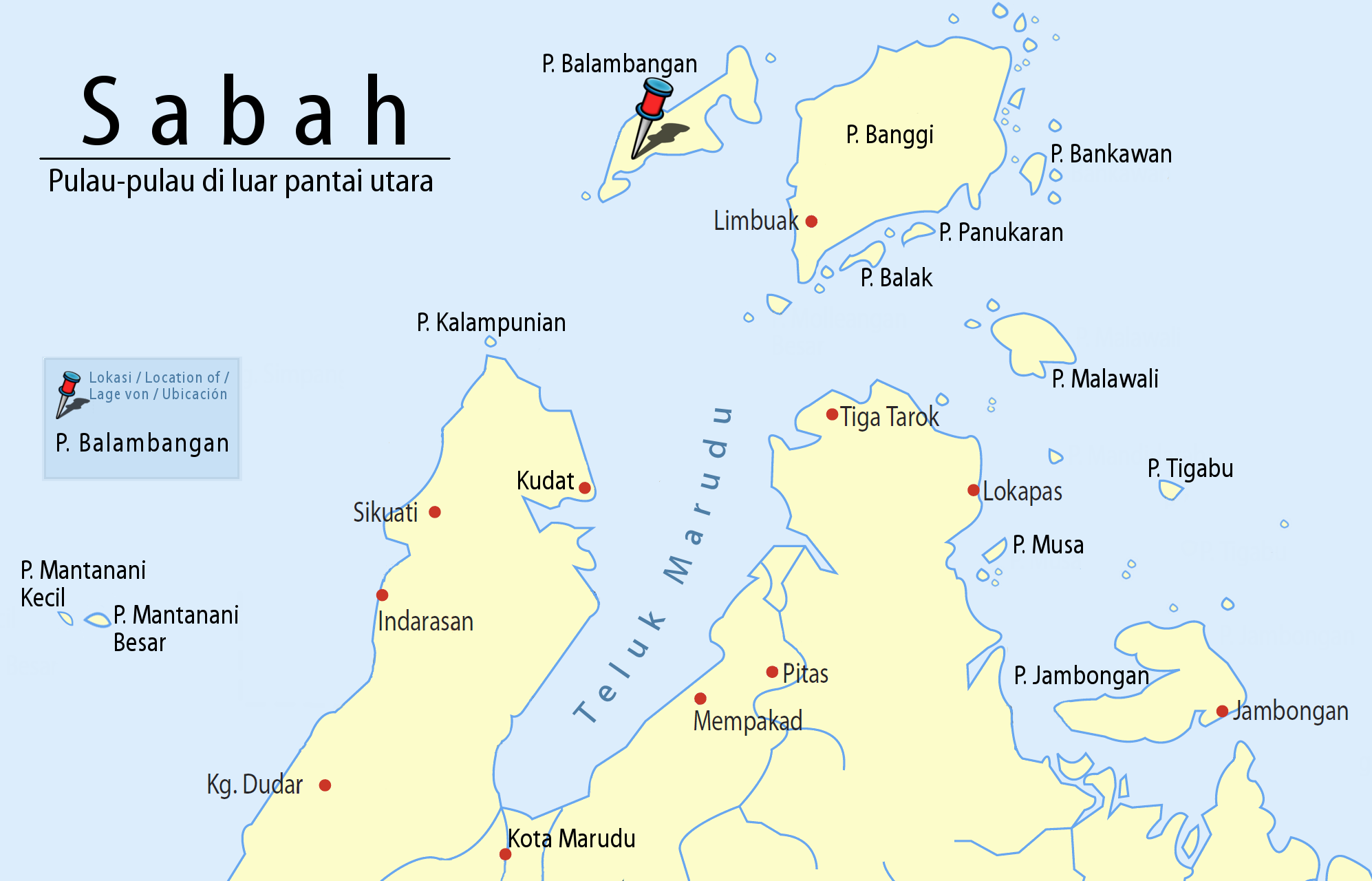
- Location of Balambangan Island between South China Sea and Sulu Sea
- Interactive map of Balambangan Island

Geography
- Location: Sulu Sea
- Coordinates: 7°15′49″N 116°53′21″E
- Archipelago: Borneo (Greater Sunda Islands)
- Adjacent to: Balabac Strait
- Area: 79 km^{2} (31 sq mi)
- Length: 24 km (14.9 mi)
- Width: 7 km (4.3 mi)
- Highest elevation: 160 ft (49 m)
- Highest point: Damper Hill

Administration
- Malaysia
- State: Sabah
- Division: Kudat
- District: Kudat

Balambangan Island (Malay: Pulau Balambangan) is an island in Kudat Division, Sabah, Malaysia. It is located off the northern tip of Borneo and is situated just about 3 kilometres west of Banggi Island. It is now part of the Tun Mustapha Marine Park.

== History ==
Alexander Dalrymple, an officer of the East India Company (EIC), concluded an agreement with Sultan Bantilan Muizzud-Din on 12 September 1762 whereby the Sultanate of Sulu ceded the island of Balambangan to the company, and Dalrymple took possession of the island on 22 January 1763. The establishment of a factory on Balambangan was officially approved by a committee of the board of directors in 1768 and Dalrymple was offered the role of management of the new settlement.

However, Dalrymple quarrelled with the directors, and his insistence on absolute management of Balambangan led to his dismissal in March 1771. Dalrymple was replaced by John Herbert who commanded the Britannia as it transported soldiers, goods, and supplies from India in 1772, and arrived at Balambangan in December 1773. The settlement traded opium, munitions, and fabrics with the Tausugs and Maguindanaons. Herbert's mismanagement of Balambangan and poor relations with the Tausugs resulted in the settlement's destruction on 26 February 1775 at the hands of Moro pirates, and Herbert and other survivors escaped to Brunei.

In the second half of the 18th century, the Dutch from Batavia attempted to settle the island's western coast, but withdrew by 1797.

In 1803, in response to the restitution of the Moluccas to the Dutch as per the Treaty of Amiens of 1802, Lord Wellesley, Governor-General of India, decided upon the resettlement of Balambangan, and instructed R. J. Farquhar, the British Resident at Amboina, to manage the expedition to the island. Farquhar reestablished the settlement at Balambangan by the end of September 1803, despite the ships Anstruther and Thornhill being wrecked off the coast of Banggi Island whilst en route from Malacca to Balambangan on 23 September, and the General Baird being destroyed by fire in the settlement's harbour on 29 October.

Farquhar left Balambangan for Penang on 7 December, and a commissioner was appointed to manage the settlement. Balambangan came under the jurisdiction of Penang, and as lieutenant governor of Penang, Farquhar planned to fortify the settlement on Balambangan, but the resumption of war with France led the court of directors of the EIC to veto the plan; the island was abandoned in 1805.

In December 1805, five members of the ill-fated crew of shipwrecked schooner Betsey made it off Balambangan Island in a small boat despite being attacked by eleven natives; however, one sailor died in the boat due to his injuries.

== See also ==
- List of islands of Malaysia

== Bibliography ==
- Bateson, Charles (1972). Australian Shipwrecks, Volume 1: 1622-1850. Sydney, Australia: A. H. & A. W. Reed.
- Campbell, Lawrence Dundas (1806). The Asiatic Annual Register, Or, a View of the History of Hindustan and of the Politics, Commerce and Literature of Asia. Vol. 6. London, UK.
- Clarke, James Stanier; McArthur, John (2010). The Naval Chronicle: Volume 15, January-July 1806: Containing a General and Biographical History of the Royal Navy of the United Kingdom with a Variety of Original Papers on Nautical Subjects. Cambridge, UK: Cambridge University Press.
- Hall, D. G. E. (1981). A History of South-East Asia. Macmillan Press.
- Warren, James Francis (1981). The Sulu Zone, 1768-1898: The Dynamics of External Trade, Slavery, and Ethnicity in the Transformation of a Southeast Asian Maritime State. Singapore: NUS Press.
