= Anstruther (1800 ship) =

History

Great Britain
- Name: Anstruther
- Namesake: Anstruther
- Launched: 1800, or 1801, or 1802
- Fate: Wrecked 22 or 23 September 1803

General characteristics
- Tons burthen: 600, or 654 (bm)
- Armament: 24 × 12&9-pounder guns

Anstruther appears in lists of vessels registered in Calcutta in 1800 and 1803 as being built there, though there is no record of her launch year. She was a "country ship", that is, a British ship that traded east of the Cape of Good Hope. She was lost in September 1803 on an expedition to Balambangan Island.

== Career ==
In 1801 Major-General Sir David Baird led an expedition to the Red Sea. Baird was in command of the Indian army that was going to Egypt to help General Ralph Abercromby expel the French there. Baird landed at Kosseir, on the Egyptian side of the Red Sea. He then led his troops army across the desert to Kena on the Nile, and then to Cairo. He arrived in time for the battle of Alexandria. Anstruther was one of the troop transports for the expedition.

In 1803 Anstruther's master was William Richardson, and her owner Fairlie, Gilmore and Co.

Lord Wellesley, Governor-General of India, decided in 1803 to re-establish a British East India Company (EIC) outpost at Balambangan and instructed R. J. Farquhar, the British Resident at Amboina, to manage the expedition.

To establish the EIC outpost the EIC sent a squadron that included Anstruther. It had Anstruther outfitted at Malacca as an armed ship with twenty-four 9&12-pounder guns, and she was carrying native troops as marines.

The expedition left Malacca on 29 August 1803.

== Loss ==
A strong south-west gale drove Anstruther past Balambangan Island and onto the shoals by Banggi Island. Losses were heavy. Eight or nine Europeans and 170 native troops were lost. Richardson and his officers and men were saved. Several officers and 120 troops were saved. Another vessel of the expedition, Thornhill, was also lost on the same day and in the same place.

Farquhar reestablished the settlement at Balambangan by the end of September 1803.

== Post script ==
The British burnt their fort and village and withdrew from Balambangan on 5 December 1806.
