= Orange Grove (1800 ship) =

British merchantman and slave ship (1800–1804)

History

Great Britain
- Name: Orange Grove
- Launched: Denmark
- Acquired: 1800
- Captured: 1804

General characteristics
- Tons burthen: 267, or 280, or 282 (bm)
- Complement: 32
- Armament: 4 × 6-pounder guns, or 2 × 4-pounder + 2 × 6-pounder guns

Orange Grove was probably of Danish origin. She first appeared in British records in 1800. She made one complete voyage as a slave ship in the triangular trade in enslaved people. The French captured her in 1804 during her second slave trading voyage after she had embarked slaves but before she could land them in the West Indies.

== Career ==
Orange Grove first appeared in Lloyd's Register (LR), and the Register of Shipping (RS) in 1801. Lloyd's Register described her as Danish, built in 1788. (Later, it changed her launch year as 1798. The Register of Shipping described her as a "DP.97", i.e., a Dutch prize, captured in 1797. The Trans-Atlantic slave Trade Database describes her as having been launched in 1788, and to have been of United States registry.

Year	Master	Owner	Trade	Source & notes
1801	Nazeby	J. Dawson & Co.	Liverpool–Demerara	RS; small repairs 1799
1801	Nazteby	Dawson & Co.	Liverpool–Hamburg	RS; small repairs 1799

Orange Grove, Nazeby, master, was reported in August 1800 to have arrived at Hamburg from Liverpool, and then in 1801 at Cork from Liverpool. Later, with Hanna, master, she was reported to have arrived at Liverpool from Trinidad.

1st voyage transporting enslaved people (1801–1802): Captain Thomas Payne sailed from Liverpool on 19 November 1801. Orange Grove's owners were Joseph Ward and Thomas Moss. In 1801, 147 vessels sailed from English ports, bound for Africa to acquire and transport enslaved people; 122 of these vessels sailed from Liverpool.

Payne acquired captives at New Calabar and arrived at the Bahamas on 5 July 1802 with 254 captives. She went on to Havana and Louisiana. She left for England on 6 October and arrived back at Liverpool on 25 November. She had sailed from Liverpool with 32 crew members and had suffered eight crew deaths on her voyage.

Year	Master	Owner	Trade	Source & notes
1804	T.Payne	Ward & Co.	Liverpool–Africa	LR; repaired 1803

2nd voyage transporting enslaved people (1802): Captain Payne sailed from Liverpool on 11 February 1803. In 1803, 99 vessels sailed from English ports, bound for Africa to acquire and transport enslaved people; 83 of these vessels sailed from Liverpool.

On 16 February, Orange Grove, Payne, master was driven ashore on the Half Mile Rocks. She was on a voyage from Liverpool to Africa. A few days later she was gotten off.

War with France had resumed after Captain Payne had sailed. Still, Thomas Payne acquired a letter of marque on 30 July 1803.

Orange Grove was reported at Gorée, and then on 23 September to have arrived at Loanga. He sailed from Loanga on 14 December.

== Fate ==
Lloyd's List reported in April 1804 that the French had captured Orange Grove, Payne, master, as she was sailing to the West Indies from Africa. They took her into Guadeloupe. Lloyd's Register for 1805 carried the annotation "captured" beneath her name.

In May 1804 Lloyd's List reported that an Orange Grove, no master's name given, was at Jamaica, having come from Liverpool. Other reports make clear that the vessel in question was Orange, Grove, master. Orange Grove herself appeared on a French list of 92 prizes taken into Guadeloupe.

In 1804, 30 British vessels in the triangular trade were lost; 15 of these vessels were lost in the Middle Passage. During the period 1793 to 1807, war, rather than maritime hazards or resistance by the captives, was the greatest cause of vessel losses among British enslaving vessels.
