= General Baird (1801 ship) =

History

United Kingdom
- Name: General Baird
- Namesake: Sir David Baird, 1st Baronet
- Builder: Rangoon
- Launched: 1801, or 1802
- Fate: Destroyed by fire 29 October 1803

General characteristics
- Tons burthen: 550, or 650 (bm)

General Baird was built in Rangoon in 1801 or 1802 as a "country ship", that is, a British ship that traded east of the Cape of Good Hope. Her master was W. Fleming, and her owner Fairlie, Gilmore and Co.

In 1803 Lord Wellesley, Governor-General of India, had decided upon the resettlement of Balambangan Island and instructed R. J. Farquhar, the British Resident at Amboina, to manage the expedition.

The expedition sailed from Malacca on 29 August.

Farquhar reestablished the settlement at Balambangan by the end of September 1803.

A fire on 29 October 1803 destroyed General Baird, Captain Fleming, master, in the harbour at Balambangan. She caught fire and burned to the water's edge.

Post script: The British burnt their fort and village and withdrew from Balambangan on 5 December 1806.
