= HMS Selby (1798) =

British merchantman and Royal Navy sloop (1791–1807)

History

Great Britain
- Name: Selby
- Namesake: Selby
- Owner: Woodcock
- Builder: Whitby
- Launched: 1791
- Fate: Sold 1798

Great Britain
- Name: HMS Selby
- Acquired: 1798 by purchase
- Honours and awards: Naval General Service Medal with clasp "Capture of the Desiree"
- Fate: Sold 1801

United Kingdom
- Name: Selby
- Acquired: 1801 by purchase
- Fate: Wrecked 1807 but last listed in 1810

General characteristics
- Tons burthen: 348, or 354, or 363 bm
- Length: 100 ft 0 in (30.5 m) (overall); 83 ft 1 1/28 in (25.3 m) (keel)
- Beam: 29 ft 3 1/2 in (8.9 m)
- Depth of hold: 12 ft 7 1/2 in (3.8 m)
- Propulsion: Sails
- Sail plan: Ship-sloop
- Complement: 90
- Armament: 1798:6 × 4-pounder guns; HMS:20 × 32-pounder carronades (Upper deck)

HMS Selby was the mercantile Selby built in 1791 at Whitby. She was a North Sea and Baltic trader until the British Royal Navy purchased her in 1798. Selby's purchase was one of a number of purchases of armed ships or ship-sloops where the Navy's intent was to use them as convoy escorts. Selby was at the raid on Dunkirk, though she played no real role. The Navy sold her in 1801. She then returned to being a merchantman. She was probably wrecked in February 1807, but was still listed until 1810, trading between London and Jamaica.

== Merchantman ==
Selby first appeared in published British registries in the 1793 volume of Lloyd's Register (LR). Her master was Woodhouse, and her owner was Woodcock. Her trade was Liverpool to Ostend.

Selby still appeared in the 1799 volume of Lloyd's Register, which presumably went to press before her sale to the Navy. Her master was Thompson, and she was sailing between Riga and Portsmouth.

== Naval career ==
The Navy purchased Selby in 1798. Between 5 April and 3 May she was at Perry & Co., Blackwall, undergoing fitting-out. Commander Thomas Palmer commissioned Selby in May 1798 at Sheerness. She moved to Woolwich Dockyard on 16 July for further work.

Selby was anchored at the Nore when, at 7:30 in the morning of 3 May 1800, Palmer shot himself. A brief obituary in the Naval Chronicle reported, "the unfortunate death ... of Captain Palmer, of the Selby sloop of war, who shot himself in a fit of insanity; which circumstance, however deplorable, will tend, in the eyes of his friends, to lessen the calamity."

At some point, Commander William Compton took command of Selby and he was her captain between 27 June and 8 July 1800, when Selby participated in the raid on Dunkirk. This was an operation to capture the French frigate Désirée from Dunkerque harbour and burn other vessels. Contrary winds and a succession of unfavourable tides afforded no opportunity of making the attack until 7 July.

Captain Inman of Andromeda was in charge of the operation. He sent HMS Dart, under Patrick Campbell, against the easternmost vessel, and loosed his four fireships, Comet, Falcon, Rosario, and Wasp against the westernmost vessels. Dart captured Désirée on 8 July. Even though their captains remained on the fireships until the four were engulfed in flames, the three frigates that were being targeted cut their cables and escaped down the Inner Channel within the Braak Sand, where one frigate briefly ran aground but her crew got her off again. Inman had kept Selby back, intending that if any French vessels ran aground she could come up and throw carcasses aboard them. He stated that his plan had been in error because if Selby had been forward he was sure that she could have captured that vessel.

Désirée was subsequently purchased into the Royal Navy. The officers and crews of many British vessels, Rosario among them, shared in the proceeds of the capture. In 1847, the Admiralty awarded the Naval General Service Medal with clasp "Capture of the Desiree" to all surviving claimants from the action.

On 19 March 1801, Selby recaptured Freedom, James Holden, master, which a French privateer had previously taken.

The "Principal Officers and Commissioners of His Majesty's Navy" offered Selby, of 348 tons and copper-fastened, for sale at Sheerness on 16 December 1801. She sold on that day for £1850.

== Merchantman ==
Selby appeared in Lloyd's Register for 1802 with Thompson, master, and Woodcock, owner. On 12 April 1804, Selby, Peters, master, Cox & Co. owners, ran aground at Margate on her way to Jamaica.

Between 19 and 22 February 1807, numerous British vessels were driven ashore in France. Selby, of 250 tons and 14 men was one of the vessels driven ashore between Havre and Dunkirk. Two of her 14 crew were lost. (There is no other Selby listed in LR.)

Selby was last listed in the Register of Shipping in 1810 with Walter Sky master, Higgins, owner, and trade London—Jamaica.
