= List of ship launches in 1784 =

The list of ship launches in 1784 includes a chronological list of some ships launched in 1784.

Date	Ship	Class	Builder	Location	Country	Notes
5 March	Verwagting	Third rate		Hoorn	Dutch Republic	For Dutch Navy.
9 March	Director	St Albans-class ship of the line	Cleveley	Gravesend	Great Britain	For Royal Navy.
22 March	Cerberus	Third rate		Amsterdam	Dutch Republic	For Dutch Navy.
22 March	Sir Edward Hughes	East Indiaman		Bombay Dockyard	India	For British East India Company.
23 March	Guardian	Roebuck-class ship	Robert Batson	Limehouse	Great Britain	For Royal Navy.
25 March	Palma	Palma-class frigate	Giacomo Giacomazzo	Venice	Republic of Venice	For Venetian Navy.
31 March	Fama	Fama-class ship of the line	Giovanni Domenico Giacomazzi	Venice	Republic of Venice	For Venetian Navy.
19 April	Venerable	Culloden-class ship of the line	Perry, Wells & Green	Blackwall Yard	Great Britain	For Royal Navy.
21 April	Andromeda	Hermione-class frigate	John Sutton & Co.	Liverpool	Great Britain	For Royal Navy.
April	Sincère	Corvette	Raymond-Antoine Haran	Bayonne	Kingdom of France	For French Navy.
April	Utile	Gabarre	Raymond-Antoine Haran	Bayonne	Kingdom of France	For French Navy.
2 May	Astrakhan	Kavkaz-class corvette	F. Ignatyev	Kazan	Russia	For Imperial Russian Navy.
6 May	Brisk	Echo-class sloop	Phineus Jacobs	Sandgate	Great Britain	For Royal Navy.
8 May	Kronprinds Frederik	Prindsesse Sophia Frederica-class ship of the line	Henrik Gerner	Copenhagen	Denmark-Norway	For Dano-Norwegian Navy.
9 May	Unnamed	Corvette	Ivan I. Afanaseyev	Olonetsk	Russia	For Imperial Russian Navy.
12 May	Iaroslavets	Frigate	M. D. Portnov	Arkhangelsk	Russia	For Imperial Russian Navy.
12 May	Vladislav	Iaroslav-class ship of the line	M. D. Portnov	Arkhangelsk	Russia	For Imperial Russian Navy.
12 May	Yaroslav	Iaroslav-class ship of the line	M. D. Portnov	Arkhangelsk	Russia	For Imperial Russian Navy.
16 May	Iziaslav	Third rate	M. D. Portnov	Arkhangelsk	Russia	For Imperial Russian Navy.
17 May	Mstislavets	Fifth rate	M. D. Portnov	Arkhangelsk	Russia	For Imperial Russian Navy.
23 May	Rostislav	Ches'ma-class frigate	G. Ignatyev	Kronstadt	Russia	For Imperial Russian Navy.
18 June	Perdrix	Fauvette-class corvette	Hubert Pennevert	Rochefort	Kingdom of France	For French Navy.
13 July	Hector	Fourth rate		Amsterdam	Dutch Republic	For Dutch Navy.
19 July	Adventure	Adventure-class frigate	Philip Perry	Blackwall	Great Britain	For Royal Navy.
July	Indefatigable	Ardent-class ship of the line	Henry Adams	Buckler's Hard	Great Britain	For Royal Navy.
17 August	Ferret	Childers-class brig-sloop	Andrew Hills	Sandwich	Great Britain	For Royal Navy.
28 August	Audacieux	Téméraire-class ship of the line		Lorient	Kingdom of France	For French Navy.
1 September	Hussar	Enterprise-class frigate	Fabian, Clayton & Willson	Sandgate	Great Britain	For Royal Navy.
17 September	Deux Frères	Ship of the line	Pierre-Augustin Lamothe Kercaradec	Brest	Kingdom of France	For French Navy.
28 September	Santa Ana	Santa Ana-class ship of the line	Reales Astilleros de Esteiro	Ferrol	Spain	For Spanish Navy.
12 October	Sviatoi Pavel	Slava-Ekateriny-class ship of the line	S. I. Afanaseyev	Kherson	Russia	For Imperial Russian Navy.
28 October	Crescent	Flora-class frigate	John Nowlan & Thomas Calhoun	Bursledon	Great Britain	For Royal Navy.
30 October	Tremendous	Ganges-class ship of the line	Barnard	Deptford	Great Britain	For Royal Navy.
11 November	Superbe	Téméraire-class ship of the line		Brest	Kingdom of France	For French Navy.
27 November	Dido	Frigate	Stewart & Hall	Sandgate	Great Britain	For Royal Navy.
27 November	Experiment	Roebuck-class ship	Daniel Furzer	East Cowes	Great Britain	For Royal Navy.
29 November	Mermaid	Active-class frigate	J. Pollard	Sheerness Dockyard	Great Britain	For Royal Navy.
27 December	Eolo	Leon Trionfante-class ship of the line	Iseppo Livio	Venice	Republic of Venice	For Venetian Navy.
27 December	Stately	Ardent-class ship of the line	Raymond	Northam	Great Britain	For Royal Navy.
Unknown date	Alexander	Merchantman	Thomas Walton	Hull	Great Britain	For private owner.
Unknown date	Äran	Third rate		Karlskrona	Sweden	For Royal Swedish Navy.
Unknown date	Beschermer	Fourth rate		Enkhuizen	Dutch Republic	For Dutch Navy.
Unknown date	Beşîr-i Zafer	Fourth rate		Constantinople	Ottoman Empire	For Ottoman Navy.
Unknown date	Bin Zafer	Fifth rate		Constantinople	Ottoman Empire	For Ottoman Navy.
Unknown date	Bethia	Collier	Blaydes Yard	Hull	Great Britain	For private owner.
Unknown date	Charlotte	Merchantman		River Thames	Great Britain	For Mathews & Co.
Unknown date	Clinton	East Indiaman			Great Britain	For British East India Company.
Unknown date	Dash	Sloop	Nicholas Bools	Bridport	Great Britain	For private owners.
Unknown date	Dispatch	Merchantman		Bermuda	(Kingdom of Great Britain) Bermuda	For private owner.
Unknown date	Dolphin	Packet ship		Ipswich	Great Britain	For HM Postmaster General.
Unknown date	Dublin	East Indiaman	Wells	Deptford	Great Britain	For British East India Company.
Unknown date	Duchess of Buccleugh	Merchantman		Leith	Great Britain	For private owner.
Unknown date	Fair American	Schooner			New Spain	For private owner.
Unknown date	Fredrichswaern	Fifth rate	Henrik Gerner	Copenhagen	Denmark-Norway	For Dano-Norwegian Navy.
Unknown date	Friendship	Brig		Scarborough	Great Britain	For George Moorson, and Thomas, George & John Hopper.
Unknown date	Harriot	West Indiaman		River Thames	Great Britain	For private owner.
Unknown date	Havik	Brig-sloop		Amsterdam	Dutch Republic	For Dutch Navy.
Unknown date	Hısn-ı Gazat	Fifth rate		Constantinople	Ottoman Empire	For Ottoman Navy.
Unknown date	Horssen	East Indiaman		Delft	Dutch Republic	For Dutch East India Company.
Unknown date	Kavkaz	Kavkaz-class corvette	F. Ignatyev	Kazan	Russia	For Imperial Russian Navy.
Unknown date	King George	East Indiaman	Perry	Blackwall	Great Britain	For Henry Hide Pelly.
Unknown date	Leeuw	Sixth rate		Rotterdam	Dutch Republic	For Dutch Navy.
Unknown date	Liberty	West Indiaman		Broadstairs	Great Britain	For private owner.
Unknown date	Little Joe	Slave ship		Liverpool	Great Britain	For private owner.
Unknown date	Mars	Indfrødsretten-class ship of the line			Denmark-Norway	For Dano-Norwegian Navy.
Unknown date	Meermin	Brig		Vlissingen	Dutch Republic	For Dutch Navy.
Unknown date	Panter	Cutter		Rotterdam	Dutch Republic	For Dutch Navy.
Unknown date	Pink No. 1	Pink			Russia	For Imperial Russian Navy.
Unknown date	Pink No. 2	Pink			Russia	For Imperial Russian Navy.
Unknown date	Raaf	Corvette		Rotterdam	Dutch Republic	For Dutch Navy.
Unknown date	Rehber-i Nusret	Fifth rate		Constantinople	Ottoman Empire	For Ottoman Navy.
Unknown date	Scipio	Corvette	F. van Zwijndregt	Rotterdam	Dutch Republic	For Dutch Navy.
Unknown date	Walker	Snow		Sunderland	Great Britain	For private owner.
Unknown date	Westergo	Third rate	J. Swerus	Harlingen	Dutch Republic	For Dutch Navy.
Unknown date	Zeeland	Third rate		Vlissingen	Dutch Republic	For Dutch Navy.
Unknown date	Zevenwolden	Third rate	J. Swerus	Harlingen	Dutch Republic	For Dutch Navy.
Unknown date	Name unknown	Merchantman			Kingdom of France	For private owner.
Unknown date	Name unknown	Smack		Dover	Great Britain	For private owner.
Unknown date	Name unknown	Merchantman			Kingdom of France	For private owner.
Unknown date	Name unknown	Merchantman		London	Great Britain	For private owner.
Unknown date	Name unknown	Schooner			Kingdom of France	For private owner.
