= Robust (1782 ship) =

History

France
- Launched: 1779
- Captured: 1781

Great Britain
- Name: Robust
- Owner: 1788: J. Fisher; 1795: Jones; 1796: Cave/J. Jones
- Acquired: 1782 by purchase of a prize
- Fate: Last listed in 1798
- Notes: Some sources give the vessel's name as Robert, or report both names.

General characteristics
- Tons burthen: 313, or 315, or 346, or 350(bm)
- Length: 98 ft 6 in (30.0 m)
- Beam: 27 ft 9 in (8.5 m)
- Complement: c.40
- Armament: 16 × 9&6-pounder guns + 2 × 6-pounder carronades + 6 Swivel guns
- Notes: Two decks & three masts

Robust was built in France in 1779. The British captured her in 1781 and she was registered at Liverpool in 1783. She first entered Lloyd's Register in 1789 as whaler in the northern whale fishery (Greenland and Davis Strait). Then in December 1788 she left on the first of three voyages as a slave ship in the triangular trade in enslaved people. On her third voyage as a slave ship Robust captured a French slave ship and recaptured two British slave ships that a French privateer had captured earlier. After her third voyage as a slaver owners shifted her registry to Bristol and she then made two voyages to the southern whale fishery. She returned from the second voyage in 1797 and is last listed in 1798.

== Career ==
Robust's early history under British ownership is obscure. She did not appear in Lloyd's Register until 1789. At that time she appeared with L. Smith, master, J. Fisher, owner, and trade Liverpool–Davis Strait. That is, she apparently had been sailing in the northern whale fishery, possibly under another name.

1st slave trading voyage (1788–1790): Captain James Bowie sailed from Liverpool on 17 December 1788. She arrived at Dominica on 26 January 1790 and landed 304 slaves. At some point Captain Richard Kelly replaced Bowie. Robust returned to Liverpool on 25 April 1790. She had left with a crew of 35 and suffered 12 crew deaths on her voyage.

In 1791 Robust underwent a large repair.

2nd slave trading voyage (1791–1792): Captain James Bowie sailed from Liverpool on 29 May 1791, Robust arrived at Africa on 29 August and left on 14 March 1792. She arrived at Kingston 20 May and landed 324 slaves there. At some point Captain John Thornborrow replaced Bowie. Robust left Kingston on 1 July and arrived at Liverpool on 9 August. She had left 38 crew members and suffered 14 crew deaths on her voyage. In 1792 Robust underwent repairs for damages.

3rd slave trading voyage (1793–1794): Captain Archibald Forrest acquired a letter of marque on 9 March 1793, immediately after the outbreak of War with France. He sailed from Liverpool on 24 March 1793, bound for Calabar. On 20 November Lloyd's List reported that Robust (Forrest, late master), had captured the French vessel Patriote du Sol on the African coast. Patriote del Sol was carrying 260 slaves and cargo. (Note: Another source gives the French vessel's name as Patriote Soldat. The French slave trader was Soldat Patriote, Laupmann et Compagnie, owners, Charles-François Giraudeau (or Girodeau), which had left Nantes on 7 September 1792, and had started acquiring slaves at Calabar in December. She had acquired some 260 slaves, and arrived in Dominica in September 1793. She was on her third slave trading voyage, the first as Guerrier. Soldat Patriote had suffered 13 crew deaths and one desertion at Old Calabar. The British had captured her on 22 June 1793.)

Robust also recaptured Little Joe, and Echo, Captain Kelly, which the French privateer Liberty, of Bordeaux, had captured. (Note: Liberty also captured Union, Mercury, Hazard, Prosperity, and Swift, Roper, master. HMS Andromeda recaptured Prosperity; the cutter HMS Seaflower recaptured Mercury. Liberty plundered Swift of 224 "elephants' teeth" (ivory tusks), and 33 slaves, before ransoming her for £1000. All seven vessels that Liberty had captured were slave traders.) (Note: There was a Liberté, privateer from Bordeaux, that was commissioned in February 1793 under Jacques Laventy with 16 to 20 guns. She was sold in Guadeloupe in June 1793 by a Mister Mehy, and operated under a Captain Le Bas until 1794.) Robust sent Patriote Soldat into Dominica. Lloyd's List reported in March 1794 that Patriote Soldat, a prize to Robust, had arrived in Dominica.

Captain Thomas Shaw replaced Forrest. Robust arrived at Kingston in May 1794 and landed 160 slaves. She left Kingston on 23 July and arrived back at Liverpool on 24 September. She had left with 52 crew members and she suffered 16 crew deaths on her voyage.

Lloyd's Register for 1795 showed Robust's master changing from A. Forrest to T. Leece, her owner from J. Fisher to "Hnirson", and her trade from Liverpool–Africa to Liverpool–Southern Fishery.

Robust underwent repairs in 1795.

1st southern whale fishery voyage (1795): Robert/Robust, T(haddeus) Luce, master, was reported to have sailed in 1795, and to have been at Rio in November. (Note: Luce had been captain of Charming Kitty.)

2nd southern whale fishery voyage (1796–1797): Captain T. Luce sailed from England in 1796 for the Pacific Ocean. Robust returned to England on 25 July 1797. (Note: Luce went on to be captain of Allison and Charming Kitty on whaling voyages.)

== Fate ==
Lloyd's Register still listed Robust in 1798 with T. Luce, master, and J. Jones, owner. It gave her trade as Bristol-Southern Fishery. However, Robust does not appear in the reports of vessels' arrival and departure in 1797–1798 after her return from her second voyage.
