= Henry Inman (Royal Navy officer) =

Royal Navy officer

Captain Henry Inman
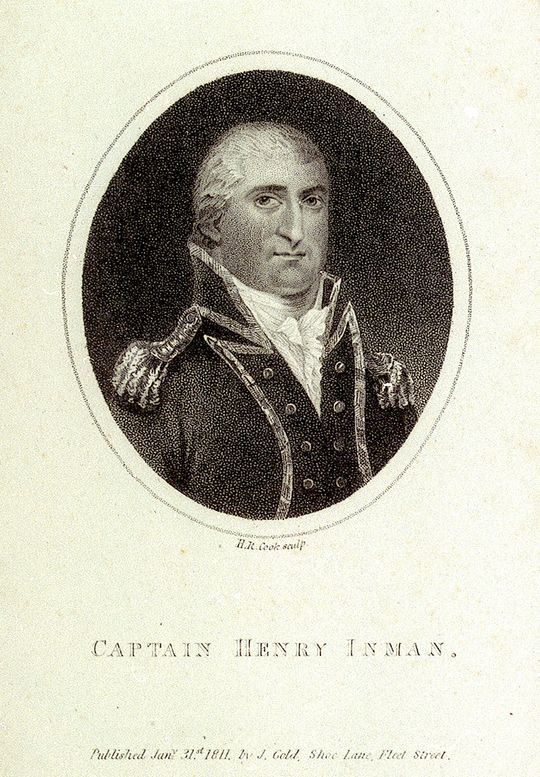
- Engraving of Inman by Henry Cook, 1811
- Born: 1762; Burrington, Somerset
- Died: 15 July 1809 (aged 46–47); Madras, British India
- Military career
- Allegiance: Great Britain; United Kingdom
- Branch: Royal Navy
- Service years: 1776–1809
- Rank: Captain
- Conflicts: American War of Independence; French Revolutionary Wars; Siege of Toulon; Raid on Dunkirk; Battle of Copenhagen; Napoleonic Wars; Battle of Cape Finisterre

Captain Henry Inman (1762 – 15 July 1809) was a Royal Navy officer during the late eighteenth and early nineteenth centuries, serving in the American War of Independence, the French Revolutionary Wars and the Napoleonic Wars. Inman's service in the American war was punctuated by three shipwrecks: the burning of HMS Lark off Rhode Island in the face of a superior French squadron, the grounding of HMS Santa Monica on Tortola and the foundering of Hector following an engagement with two French ships in the Mid-Atlantic. After the war he was placed in reserve until the Spanish Armament of 1790, when he was given command of the 14-gun cutter HMS Pygmy stationed off the Isle of Man.

Inman's subsequent service career was principally in frigates: he was engaged at the Siege of Toulon in HMS Aurore, in a raid at Dunkirk in HMS Andromeda and participated in the Battle of Copenhagen as captain of HMS Désirée. He later served on the ship of the line HMS Triumph at the Battle of Cape Finisterre and was subsequently called to give evidence at the court martial of Sir Robert Calder. After the battle off Finisterre, Inman suffered from ill-health and remained on shore duty until 1809 when he was appointed as Admiralty commissioner for Madras. The lengthy sea journey to India exacerbated his existing health problems and he died just ten days after his arrival.

== Early life ==
Henry Inman was born in 1762, the son of the vicar of the Somerset village of Burrington, Reverend George Inman. Educated by his father until the age of 14, Inman was sent to join the Royal Navy in 1776, posted aboard the 90-gun second rate HMS Barfleur. Barfleur's captain was Sir Samuel Hood, later to become Viscount Hood, who formed a close personal and professional attachment to his subordinate that continued throughout Inman's military service. After two years on Barfleur, Inman was transferred to the frigate HMS Lark in 1778 for service off New England. The American Revolutionary War had broken out three years earlier, but Barfleur had been based in Britain and so there had been no opportunity for action aboard Hood's ship. His career in Lark was cut short on 5 August 1778, when Captain John Brisbane, the senior officer off Rhode Island, ordered the frigate beached and burnt with four other ships when a French fleet under Vice-Admiral Comte d'Estaing appeared off the harbour. Inman and the rest of the crew were transferred to shore duties and over the following week engaged D'Estaing's ships from fixed gun batteries as they bombarded the British positions.

Inman had lost all his personal possessions in the destruction of Lark and was forced to replace his uniform from his own wages when the Navy refused to provide compensation. Returning to Britain in the frigate HMS Pearl, Inman was promoted to lieutenant in 1780 and returned to the Americas in HMS Camel, transferred soon afterwards into HMS Santa Monica in the West Indies. Shortly after his arrival however, Inman was once again shipwrecked when Santa Monica grounded off Tortola. Although the crew reached the shore in small boats, the ship broke up rapidly and once again Inman lost all of his possessions. Remaining on shore service in the West Indies for the next two years, Inman was again employed in the aftermath of the Battle of the Saintes, appointed to the prize crew of the captured French vessel Hector for the journey to Britain. Hector's masts and hull had been seriously damaged in the battle, requiring lighter spars to be fitted and 22 of her 74 guns removed to make her more seaworthy. As the fleet could not spare men to man her, the 223-strong prize crew was made up of men pressed in the Caribbean, principally invalids unfit for frontline service.

On 14 August 1782, Hector separated from the rest of the prize ships in heavy weather and on 22 August encountered two large French frigates, Aigle of 40 guns and Gloire of 32 guns. Together these vessels significantly outclassed the leaky ship of the line in weight of shot, but Captain John Bourchier determined to resist the French attack, preparing Hector as the French approached. The French ships surrounded Hector at 02:00 and the engagement was furiously contested, with Bourchier wounded early on and many of his officers following him below with serious injuries. Within a short period, Inman was the only officer remaining on deck, but he was able to successfully drive the French away following a failed attempt to board, although Hector was left in a severely damaged state with 75 men killed or wounded. A hurricane that followed the battle inflicted further damage and the ship was badly flooded, seawater ruining the food supplies and threatening to sink the ship completely. Some of the crew were so ill and exhausted that they collapsed and died while manning the pumps. Inman only managed to prevent the remaining sailors from fleeing below decks by carrying loaded pistols and threatening men who refused his orders. Once the storm had abated it was clear that Hector was foundering; her rudder and masts had been torn away and the pumps were unable to keep pace with the water leaking through the battered hull. For two weeks Inman made desperate efforts to keep the ship afloat, as food and water supplies ran low and the hull began to collapse in on itself. Fortunately for the men aboard Hector, the tiny snow Hawke appeared and approached the ship of the line to render assistance. Throwing his cargo overboard, Captain John Hill worked with Inman to supervise the transfer of all of Hector's remaining men, many of whom were wounded or sick, into Hawke as Hector rapidly sank. No men were lost in the operation and Inman was the last to leave, Hector disappearing ten minutes after the boat carrying him reached Hawke. The snow set sail for St John's in Newfoundland, its crew and passengers subsisting on short rations; they arrived off the port on the same day they consumed the last water supplies.

== French Revolutionary Wars ==
With the Peace of Versailles in 1783, the war ended and Inman was placed on half-pay in reserve, suffering from poor health caused by his ordeal on Hector. Retiring to his father's house in Somerset, Inman was not employed again until 1790, when the Spanish Armament provoked a rapid expansion of the Navy. He was initially commissioned into the frigate HMS Latona under Captain Albemarle Bertie, but in the aftermath of the emergency Inman was given command of the 14-gun cutter HMS Pigmy, stationed on the Isle of Man. He also married the daughter of Commander Thomas Dalby in 1791; the couple had a son and a daughter. With the outbreak of the French Revolutionary Wars in 1793, Inman was transferred to Lord Hood's flagship HMS Victory in the Mediterranean, receiving a promotion to commander on 11 September. Serving during the Siege of Toulon, Inman assisted in the removal of captured French ships from Toulon harbour and as a reward was promoted to post captain on 9 October and given command of the newly captured HMS Espion. While she was stationed off Hyères, Aurore engaged French Republican gun batteries, expending 20,000 cannonballs in November and December.

When Toulon fell to the Republicans on 18 December 1793, Inman was initially sent to Corsica and then tasked with carrying a large number of Republican prisoners of war to Malta. With an understrength crew, Inman had difficulty in controlling the prisoners, who deliberately holed the bottom of the ship during the voyage. On arriving at Malta, Inman anchored his leaking ship in deep water under the guns of the port's defensive batteries and then removed his entire crew, leaving instructions with the prisoners that they could either pump out the water and repair the damage or drown when the ship sank. The prisoners repaired the ship and were taken into captivity on Malta. Transferred from Aurore, Inman spent a brief period on the frigate HMS San Fiorenzo before returning to Britain in command of the fourth rate HMS Romney.

Romney was paid off on arrival in Britain and Inman returned to the reserve until 1796, when he was made temporary captain of Lion and then took command of the frigate HMS Espion. Ordered to sail for the River Clyde, Inman set sail with his family on board but Espion, an old ship in a poor state of repair, was struck by a gale in the English Channel and was almost destroyed. Eventually reaching safety in Spithead, Espion was reduced to the reserve until extensive repairs could be made and Inman was again placed on half-pay. He was reinstated in 1797 as temporary commander of the ship of the line HMS Belliqueux in the immediate aftermath of the Nore Mutiny. Belliqueux had been heavily involved in the uprising: three members of the crew were under sentence of death and six others facing severe punishment for their part in the revolt. Inman was consequently afraid for his life and for the next six months slept with three loaded pistols beside him. Belliqueux was assigned to the blockade of the French Atlantic seaport of Brest and Inman continued to perform this service after he was moved to HMS Ramillies during 1798, in which he participated in the chase that eventually led to the capture of Hercule. He was subsequently posted to the frigate HMS Andromeda in early 1799.

=== Désirée and Copenhagen ===
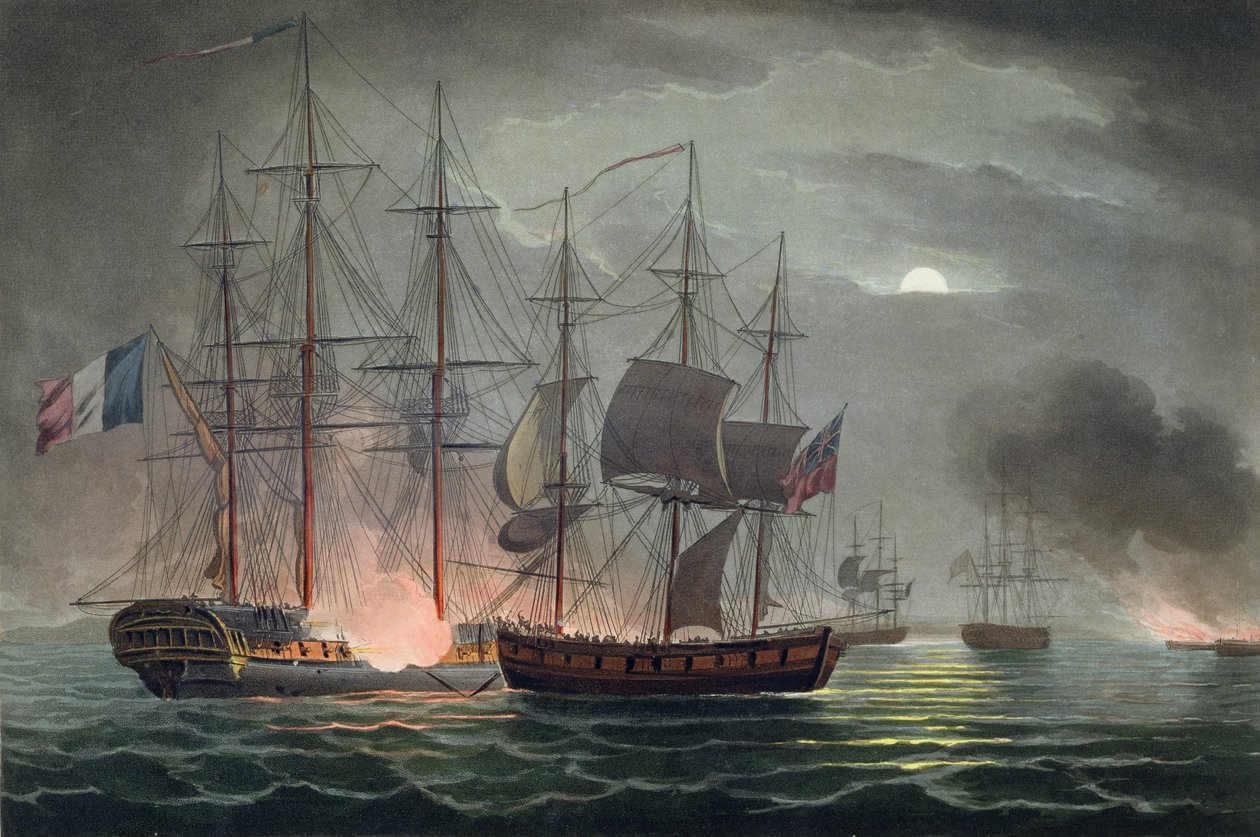
1816 illustration of the raid on Dunkirk by Thomas Whitcombe

On 2 August 1799, Inman seized the neutral merchant ship Vrienden carrying a cargo of hemp. Although the vessel's legal state was uncertain, no merchant claimed its cargo and in 1802 she was condemned and sold for over 247 l. In November 1799, Andromeda was attached to the force that evacuated the Duke of York's army following the failure of the Anglo-Russian invasion of Holland and he remained in the region, observing movements off the Elbe. Andromeda also participated in the Raid on Dunkirk on 7 July 1800, when four French frigates were attacked by a squadron of British ships in Dunkirk harbour. Although an assault with fireships failed, HMS Dart captured the French frigate Désirée, with Inman following in the cutter Vigilant, crewed by thirty volunteers from Andromeda. Under fire from all sides, Inman successfully boarded the French ship following her surrender and brought her out of the harbour, sending the crew ashore on parole to avoid having to assign men to guard them. Désirée was brought back to Britain and commissioned into the Royal Navy, Inman taking command of the new frigate.

In 1801, Désirée was attached to the fleet gathering at Yarmouth under Sir Hyde Parker and Lord Nelson for service in the Baltic Sea against the League of Armed Neutrality. Sailing for Denmark in March, the fleet anchored off Copenhagen and on 1 April a squadron under Nelson closed with the Danish fleet, which was anchored in a line of battle protecting the harbour. Désirée was ordered to operate at the Southern end of the Danish line, engaging shore batteries and nearby ships while their attention was focused on the main British battle-line. When the battle began at 10:00 on 2 April, Inman engaged the Provesteen, which was firing on the 50-gun HMS Isis. Désirée succeeded in inflicting considerable damage on the Danish ship and drew some fire away from the battered Isis. Once Provesteen had been abandoned by her Danish crew Désirée was engaged with a number of Danish shore batteries, but due to poor aim of the Danish gunners, who fired over the frigate throughout the engagement, she was not badly damaged and suffered only four men wounded in the battle. At 14:00 Danish fire slackened and shortly afterwards Nelson began to withdraw his ships out of range of the Danes. A number of his ships of the line grounded on the complicated shoals in the region and when Désirée came to the assistance of HMS Bellona] she too became stuck. Bellona was hauled off by Isis shortly afterwards, but Désirée was forced to remain on the sandbank for two days until boats from the squadron could be spared to drag her free.

== Napoleonic Wars ==
At the Peace of Amiens, Désirée remained in service with orders to sail for the West Indies. Inman, whose health was beginning to suffer, resigned command and returned to his family on half-pay until the outbreak of the Napoleonic Wars in 1803, when he was given the 64-gun ship of the line HMS Utrecht. In 1804 he moved from Utrecht to the 74-gun HMS Triumph and in February 1805 was attached to the fleet under Sir Robert Calder stationed off Cape Finisterre during the Trafalgar campaign. At 11:00 on 22 July, Calder sighted the French and Spanish fleet under Vice-Admiral Pierre-Charles Villeneuve emerging from the fog off Ferrol and attacked, Triumph third in line behind HMS Hero and HMS Ajax. The battle lines tacked and closed with one another, beginning a general action at 18:00, eventually separating at 21:30. Triumph was heavily engaged in the melee, in which two Spanish ships were captured, and suffered severe damage although light casualties of five killed and six wounded. On 26 July, Inman was briefly detached from the fleet to chase away the French frigate Didon before returning to her station in the battle line, but the action was not resumed, Calder ordering the fleet to return to Britain. In the aftermath of the battle, Calder faced a court martial for his failure to resume the engagement and Inman was called to give evidence: when questioned as to why he had not informed Calder about the damage to his ship, Inman replied "I did not think that a proper time to trouble the admiral with my complaints".

Inman's health had suffered during his long career at sea, and although he returned to sea in December 1805 aboard Triumph during the Atlantic campaign of 1806 as part of the squadron under Rear-Admiral Sir Richard Strachan, his ill-health forced his replacement by Sir Thomas Hardy in May. Returning to his family ashore, Inman was initially given command of the sea fencibles at King's Lynn before he was made Admiralty commissioner at Madras by Lord Mulgrave in 1809. The journey to India broke his health completely and he died on 15 July 1809, just ten days after arriving in Madras.
