= Union (1791 ship) =

History

Great Britain
- Name: Union
- Owner: John Ratcliffe, George Hauit, & William Thompson
- Builder: Liverpool
- Launched: 1791
- Captured: 1793

General characteristics
- Tons burthen: 113 (bm)
- Complement: 24
- Armament: 10 × 4-pounder guns

Union was launched in 1791 in Liverpool, England. She became a slave ship that the French captured on her first slave voyage. Captain R. Farrington sailed for West Africa on 15 August 1792.

Captain George Hauit acquired a letter of marque for Union on 1 March 1793, just after the outbreak of war with France.

The French privateer Liberty, of Bordeaux, captured seven slave ships before July 1793: Union, Farrington, Little Joe, Echo, Mercury, Hazard, Prosperity, and Swift, Roper, master. The capture of Union took place off Bassa. (Note: There was a Liberté, privateer from Bordeaux, with 16 to 20 guns, that was commissioned in February 1793 under Jacques Laventy. She was sold in Guadeloupe in June 1793 by a Mister Mehy, and operated under a Captain Le Bas until 1794.)

Robust recaptured Little Joe and Echo. HMS Andromeda recaptured Prosperity; the cutter HMS Seaflower recaptured Mercury. Liberty ransomed Swift after plundering her.
