= Hired armed cutter Ann =

His Majesty's hired armed cutter Ann served the British Royal Navy from 9 May 1795 to 19 October 1801 during the French Revolutionary Wars. She was of 10491/94 tons (bm) and carried twelve 3-pounder guns. (Note: In 1794 two ships named Ann, both of 104 tons burthen, received a letter of marque. One, under John Joynson, is described as being armed with six 3-pounders and the letter is dated 18 April. The second, under Joseph Gawen, is described as being armed with eight 3-pounders and four swivel guns, and her letter is dated 6 August. These two cutters may have been the same vessel, and either, or neither, of these may have been the vessel the Royal Navy hired in 1795.)

== Service ==
In 1798 Lieutenant Robert (or Richard) Young came to command Ann. On 31 January 1798 she captured the fishing boat Leopold. On 28 March she captured Greffwen, of Gothland. On 20 July she was in company with Orestes when they captured the luggers Mayflower and William. At some point she also captured the luggers Joseph and Edward.

On 23 May 1799, while engaged in the protection of the fisheries off Folkestone, at 8pm Ann gave chase to a lugger. After a two-hour running fight she succeeded in capturing Aimable Therese, a small French privateer lugger of four guns and 27 men. At the time, Ann was in company with sloop Eugenie and the hired armed cutter Nox. (Note: A first-class share of the prize money was worth £ 18 15s 5 3/4d; a fifth-class share, that of a seaman, was worth 11s 8 3/4d.)

On 11 October Ann and the hired armed cutter Lion recaptured three small vessels. On the evening of 21 November, after a chase of five hours, Ann captured the French privateer cutter Petit Diable some three to four leagues south-southwest of Beachy Head. Commanded by Simon Robert Saltitat, Petit Diable was two days out of Dieppe and carried only eight men with small arms. The rest of the crew had been sent back to France in a small sloop the privateer had cut out from Seaford Roads the previous night. On 28 November Ann captured the fishing boats Brune and St Joseph.

Ann captured the vessel Grosser Steir on 27 March 1800. In July 1800, Ann participated in the Raid on Dunkirk, which resulted in the cutting out of the French frigate Désirée. During the action on 8 July, Ann, together with the gun-brig Biter and the hired armed cutter Kent, engaged some French gunboats and prevented them from intervening. Biter had three officers and men wounded and each of the cutters suffered one man wounded. In 1847 the Admiralty awarded all surviving claimants from the action the Naval General Service Medal with the clasp "Capture of the Desiree".
