= Echo (1790 ship) =

1790s ship involved in the slave trade

History

Great Britain
- Name: Echo
- Builder: Liverpool
- Launched: 1791
- Captured: 1793, and recaptured
- Fate: Last listed in 1796

General characteristics
- Tons burthen: 127 (bm)

Echo was launched in 1791 in Liverpool as a slave ship. She made two complete voyages from Liverpool in the Atlantic triangular slave trade. On her third voyage a French privateer captured her, but a British letter of marque recaptured her. She did not return to enslaving and was last listed in 1796.

== Career ==
Echo first appeared in Lloyd's Register (LR) in 1790.

| Year | Master | Owner | Trade | Source |
|---|---|---|---|---|
| 1790 | Rd Pinder | Staniforth | Liverpool–Africa | LR |

1st enslaving voyage (1790–1791): Captain Robert Pinder sailed from Liverpool on 9 June 1790. Echo arrived at St Vincent on 15 January 1791. She arrived back at Liverpool on 7 March. She had left Liverpool with 24 crew members and she suffered one crew death on her voyage.

2nd enslaving voyage (1791–1792): Captain Pinder sailed from Liverpool on 28 June 1791, bound for the Windward Coast. Echo started acquiring captives on 19 August, first at Bassa, and then at Grand Mesurado. She sailed from Africa on 2 March 1792, and arrived at St Vincent on 16 April with 195 captives. She sailed for Liverpool on 16 April and arrived there on 11 June. She had left Liverpool with 25 crew members and she suffered six crew deaths on her voyage.

| Year | Master | Owner | Trade | Source |
|---|---|---|---|---|
| 1793 | R.Pinder; W.Williams | Staniforth | Liverpool–Africa | LR |

3rd enslaving voyage (1792–1793): Captain William Williams sailed from Liverpool on 5 August 1792, bound for West Africa. Echo gathered captives at Bassa, and then at Cape Mount.

Capture: The French privateer Liberty, of Bordeaux, captured seven enslaving ships before July 1793: Echo, Union, Little Joe, Mercury, Hazard, Prosperity, and Swift, Roper, master. Echo, Kelly, master, was captured off Cape Mount. (Note: There was a Liberté, privateer from Bordeaux, that was commissioned in February 1793 under Jacques Laventy with 16 to 20 guns. She was sold in Guadeloupe in June 1793 by a Mister Mehy, and operated under a Captain Le Bas until 1794.)

Robust recaptured Echo and Little Joe. At the time of her recapture Echo had 120 captives on board. HMS Andromeda recaptured Prosperity; the cutter HMS Seaflower recaptured Mercury. Liberty ransomed Swift for £1000 after plundering her of 224 elephants teeth (ivory tusks), and 33 captives. Echo, Pindar, master arrived at Barbados. Echo then arrived at St Vincent in August 1793.

In 1793, 17 British vessels engaged in the transport of captives from West Africa to the West Indies were lost. Six were lot off the coast of Africa, and nine were lost in the Middle Passage, between West Africa and the West Indies. During the period 1793 to 1807, war, rather than maritime hazards or resistance by the captives, was the greatest cause of vessel losses among British vessels engaged in the triangular trade.

== Fate ==
Echo was last listed in 1796, but with information unchanged since 1793.
