= HMS Rosario =

Seven ships of the Royal Navy have borne the name HMS Rosario, after the Spanish word Rosario, meaning rosary:

- HMS Rosario (1588) was a hulk, previously the Spanish galleon Del Rosario. She was captured in 1588 and broken up in 1622.
- HMS Rosario (1797) was a 14-gun fireship, previously the Spanish ship Nuestra Senora Del Rosario. She was captured off Cádiz in 1797 and expended as a fireship in 1800 at Dunkirk Roads.
- HMS Rosario (1800) was a 20-gun sixth rate, previously the French privateer Le Hardi. HMS Anson captured her in 1800, and she was taken into service as HMS Hardi. She was renamed HMS Rosario later in 1800 and was sold in 1809.
- HMS Rosario (1808) was a 10-gun Cherokee-class brig-sloop launched in 1808 and sold in 1832.
- HMS Rosario (1860) was a Rosario-class wooden screw sloop launched in 1860 and sold for breaking in 1884.
- HMS Rosario (1898) was a Condor-class sloop launched in 1898. She was used as depot ship from 1910 and was sold in 1921.
- HMS Rosario (J219) was an Algerine-class minesweeper launched in 1943. In 1952 she was transferred to the Belgian Navy, who renamed her De Moor; she was broken up in 1970.
