= Hired armed cutter Kent =

The British Royal Navy employed two vessels described as His Majesty's hired armed cutter Kent, the first during the French Revolutionary Wars and the second during the Napoleonic Wars.

== First Hired armed cutter Kent ==
The first Kent served the Royal Navy from 22 December 1798 until 19 October 1801, when she was returned to her owners. Kent had a burthen of 13113/94 tons and carried twelve 12-pounder carronades.

In 1799, Kent recaptured two colliers, the brig Autumn and the schooner Zephyr.

Between April and July 1799, Kent sailed in company with the 28-gun sloop Arrow and the 14-gun brig-sloop Wolverine. Together, these three vessels captured several prizes. On 23 April, they captured Blenie Rosetta. On 29 May, they took Active and Providence. One month later, on 28 June, they captured five fishing boats. Then, on 13 July, they captured Altona. Three days later, they captured Antony Wilhelm. Lastly, on 29 July, they captured Nancy. (On 20 January 1803, prize money resulting from the capture of Blenie Rosetta, Active, Providence, five fishing boats, Altona, Antony Wilhelm, and Nancy was due for payment.) Kent, under Lieutenant William Lanyon, also captured Vrouw Saakje on 17 June 1799.

On 27 November 1799, Kent captured the French lugger privateer Quatre Freres (Four Brothers) five leagues off the North Foreland. Four Brothers was under the command of Citizen Charles Desobier and carried four 4-pounders, swivel guns, small arms, and a crew of 24. She was one day out of Calais and had yet to take any prizes. Lanyon sent her into Ramsgate. Kent shared the capture with Anacreon.

In July 1800, Kent, under Lieutenant Robert Baron Cooban, participated in the raid on Dunkirk that resulted in the cutting out of the French frigate Désirée. During the action on 8 July, Kent, together with the gun-brig Biter and the hired armed cutter Ann, engaged some French gunboats and prevented them from intervening. Biter had three officers and men wounded, and each of the cutters suffered one man wounded. In 1847, the Admiralty awarded all surviving claimants from the action the Naval General Service Medal with a clasp that acknowledged the capture of the Desiree.

== Second Hired armed cutter Kent ==
The second Kent served from 23 to 29 September 1804 when she was returned to her owners. She had a burthen of 121 tons.

On 9 March 1805, a Kent, under the command of Robert Hosier and of 121 tons (bm) and twelve 12-pounder cannon, received a letter of marque.
