= Beaver (1796 ship) =

British slave ship

History

Great Britain
- Name: Beaver
- Namesake: Beaver
- Launched: 1796, Liverpool
- Captured: 1807

General characteristics
- Tons burthen: 235, or 243, or 262, (bm)
- Complement: 1797: 35; 1800: 1803: 35; 1805: 28; 1807: 35
- Armament: 1797: 18 × 9-pounder guns; 1800: 10 × 9-pounder guns; 1803: 20 × 9&6-pounder guns; 1805: 8 × 9-pounder guns + 10 × 18-pounder carronades; 1807: 8 × 9-pounder guns + 12 × 18-pounder carronades

Beaver was launched in 1796 at Liverpool. She made seven complete voyages as a slave ship in the triangular trade in enslaved persons. She was captured and retaken once, in 1804, and captured a second time in 1807, during her eighth voyage.

== Career ==
Beaver first appeared in Lloyd's Register (LR) in the volume for 1796.

Year	Master	Owner	Trade	Source
1796	Grayerson	Molineaux	Liverpool–Africa	LR

1st voyage transporting enslaved people (1796–1797): Captain Alexander Grierson sailed from Liverpool on 3 March 1796. In 1796, 103 vessels sailed from English ports, bound for Africa to acquire and transport enslaved people; 94 of these vessels sailed from Liverpool.

Beaver arrived at Barbados on 22 November with 390 captives that she sold there. She sailed from Barbados on 11 December and arrived back at Liverpool on 22 January 1797. From Barbados she had sailed to Demerara before returning to Liverpool. She had left Liverpool with 29 crew members and she had suffered seven crew deaths on her voyage.

2nd voyage transporting enslaved people (1797–1798): Captain Alexander Grierson acquired a letter of marque on 16 March 1797. He sailed from Liverpool on 29 March. In 1797, 104 vessels sailed from English ports, bound for Africa to acquire and transport enslaved people; 90 of these vessels sailed from Liverpool.

Beaver arrived on the Windward Coast. She was next reported to have been at Angola. Beaver stopped at Barbados and arrived at Demerara from Ambona on 22 November with 350 captives. She left Demerara on 1 February 1798 and arrived back at Liverpool on 2 April. She arrived with William Neale, master, apparently having changed masters in Demerara. She had left Liverpool with 35 crew members and she had suffered five crew deaths on her voyage.

Year	Master	Owner	Trade	Source
1798	Greirson; W.Murray	Molineaux	Liverpool–Africa	LR

3rd voyage transporting enslaved people (1798–1800): Captain William Murray sailed from Liverpool on 29 October 1798. In 1798, 160 vessels sailed from English ports, bound for Africa to acquire and transport enslaved people; 149 of these vessels sailed from Liverpool. This was the highest number of vessels during the period 1795–1804.

On her way to Africa, Beaver was in company with Otter, Captain Grierson, when they captured a brig on her way to Bilbao. The brig was carrying naval stores.

Beaver was reported at Angola. She was at Demerara and arrived at Kingston, Jamaica on 13 October 1799 with 380 captives. She sailed from Kingston on 15 November and arrived back at Liverpool on 17 January 1800. She had left Liverpool with 38 crew members and she had suffered eight crew deaths on her voyage.

Year	Master	Owner	Trade	Source
1800	W.Murray; C.Brew	Molyneaux; Rigby & Co.	Liverpool–Africa	LR

4th voyage transporting enslaved people (1800–1802): Captain Christopher Brew acquired a letter of marque on 6 May 1800. He sailed from Liverpool on 26 June, stopping at Lisbon on the way. In 1800, 133 vessels sailed from English ports, bound for Africa to acquire and transport enslaved people; 120 of these vessels sailed from Liverpool.

Beaver arrived at Suriname on 18 September 1801, having stopped at Prince's Island on her way from Africa. She arrived back at Liverpool on 18 January 1802. She had left Liverpool with 39 crew members and had suffered 13 crew deaths on her voyage.

Lloyd's List reported on 17 November 1801 that the ship Allison had been captured while sailing from Newfoundland to the West Indies, but that the letter of marques Beaver and Otter had recaptured her and sent her into Suriname.

Year	Master	Owner	Trade	Source
1802	C.Brew; R.Taylor	Rigby & Co. Lowther & Co.	Liverpool–Africa	LR

5th voyage transporting enslaved people (1802–1803): Captain Robert Taylor arrived at Gravesend from Limerick on 25 March 1802. She sailed from Liverpool on 15 May 1802. In 1802, 155 vessels sailed from English ports, bound for Africa to acquire and transport enslaved people; 122 of these vessels sailed from Liverpool.

Beaver acquired captives at New Calabar and arrived at Suriname on 24 November with 250 captives. She arrived back at Liverpool on 20 April 1803.

Year	Master	Owner	Trade	Source
1803	R.Taylor; Christie	Lowther & Co. Hind	Liverpool–Africa	LR

6th voyage transporting enslaved people (1803–1804): Captain David Christie acquired a letter of marque on 2 December 1803. He sailed from Liverpool on 20 December 1803. In 1803, 155 vessels sailed from English ports, bound for Africa to acquire and transport enslaved people; 122 of these vessels sailed from Liverpool.

In September 1804, Lloyd's List reported that Beaver had been taken in the West Indies while sailing to Barbados from Africa, but had been retaken and sent into Antigua. The recapture took place on 25 June and the recaptor was HMS Galatea. Beaver was carrying captives and ivory. Newspaper accounts put the number of captives at 250.

Year	Master	Owner	Trade	Source & notes
1806	Christie; White	Hind; Bigg & Co.	Liverpool–Africa	LR; large repair 1805

7th voyage transporting enslaved people (1805–1806): Captain Robert White acquired a letter of marque on 1 October 1805. He sailed from Liverpool on 27 October 1805.

Beaver acquired captives at Bonny and arrived at St Lucia on 18 April 1806. She sailed for Liverpool on 21 May and arrived there on 6 July. She had left Liverpool with 40 crew members and had suffered 10 crew deaths on her voyage.

She brought with her two casks of Guinea pepper, 138 hogsheads and eight barrels of sugar, 73 bales of cotton, 164 bags of cocoa, and 46 casks and two barrels of coffee, all for the account of her owners, Begg & Co. Captain White brought back one hogshead of Madeira wine for his own account.

8th voyage transporting enslaved people (1807–Loss): Captain John Bradley acquired a letter of marque on 14 January 1807. He sailed from Liverpool on 14 February 1807.

Beaver arrived at Barbados from Africa on 21 August. She had embarked 284 captives.

== Fate ==
Lloyd's List reported in December 1807 that the French privateer General Ferrand had captured a copper-bottomed Guineaman from Liverpool, of 18 guns, and carrying 250 captives. She had been sailing from Barbados when captured. Lloyd's List reported that the Guineaman was believed to have been Beaver, and that she had been taken into Cuba. (Note: Général Ferrand was a privateer commissioned in Saint-Domingue from December 1806 to April 1807.) (Note: Lloyd's List reported in August 1808 that a schooner letter of marque named General Ferrand, of five guns and 50 men had been captured and brought into Nassau. She had been sailing from Baracoa to Charleston with a cargo of coffee.)

In 1807, 12 British vessels in the triangular trade were lost; six of these vessels were lost on the Middle Passage, sailing from Africa to the West Indies. During the period 1793 to 1807, war, rather than maritime hazards or resistance by the captives, was the greatest cause of vessel losses among British enslaving vessels.
