= HMS Eugenie (1797) =

British naval sloop 1797–1803

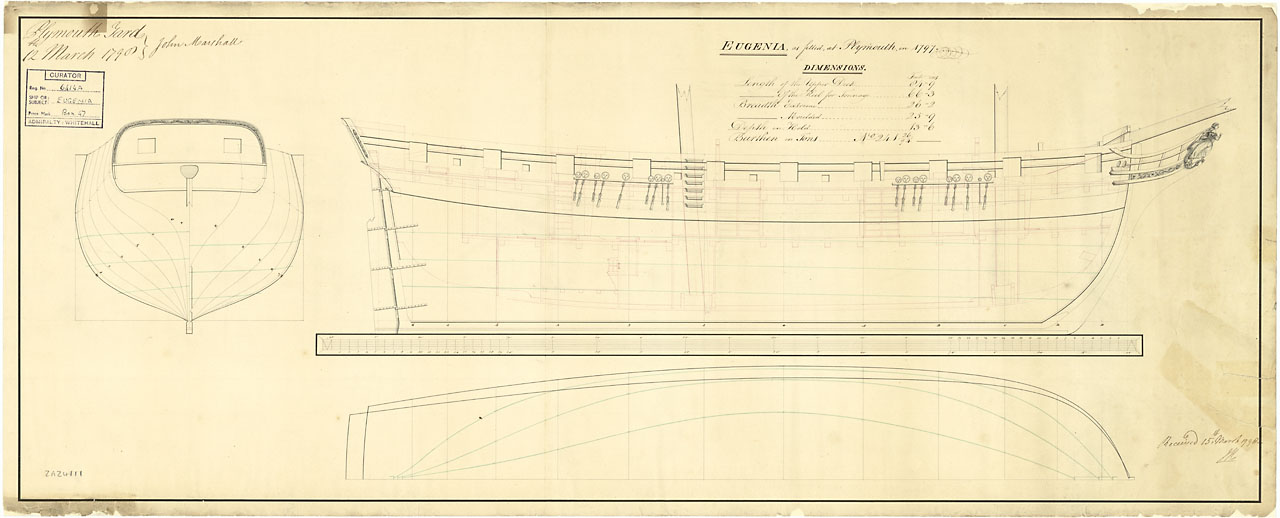
- Plan showing the body plan with stern board outline, some decoration detail and sheer lines with inboard detail.

History

France
- Name: Nouvelle Eugénie
- Builder: Nantes
- Launched: 1796
- Captured: 1797

Great Britain
- Name: Eugenie
- Acquired: 1797 by capture
- Commissioned: October 1797
- Fate: Sold 1803

General characteristics
- Tons burthen: 24126/94 (bm)
- Length: Overall:84 ft 9 in (25.8 m); Keel:66 ft 3 in (20.2 m)
- Beam: 13 ft 6 in (4.1 m)
- Depth of hold: 26 ft 2 in (8.0 m)
- Sail plan: Brig
- Complement: Privateer:120; Royal Navy:90
- Armament: Privateer:16 guns; Royal Navy:6 × 6-pounder guns

HMS Eugenie (or Eugenia) was the French privateer Nouvelle Eugénie, launched at Nantes in 1796 that the British Royal Navy captured in 1797 and took into service. As a brig-sloop she served in the Channel, primarily escorting convoys, and was sold in 1803.

== Privateer ==
Nouvelle Eugénie was built between 1796-1797 and was commissioned in 1797 under Joachim Barbier.

On a cruise in March 1797 she captured Spencer, which was carrying a cargo of coffee, sugar, and cotton from the West Indies, and sent her into Lorient.

On 11 May, Indefatigable in company with Phoebe (1795), Cleopatra, Childers, and the hired armed lugger Duke of York captured Nouvelle Eugénie. She was a razee privateer of 16 guns and carried a crew of 120 men. She was four days out of Nantes on a 30-day cruise, but had taken no prizes. The Royal Navy took her into service as HMS Eugenie.

== Royal Navy ==
Between 9 August and 27 November 1797 Eugenie was at Plymouth undergoing fitting. Part of the work involved changing her from a ship rig to a brig. Commander Philip Somerville commissioned her in October for the Downs.

On 9 April 1799 Eugenie captured Welvaart Van Pillau.

Eugenie was in company with the hired armed cutter Flirt on 11 May 1799 when they re-captured the brigs Betsey, of Liverpool, and Four Sisters, of Sunderland. Eugenie also recaptured the Danish galliott Tre Sostre or Drie Gezusters.

Eugenie. and the hired armed cutters Nox and Ann were in company on 23 May when Ann captured the four-gun privateer lugger Aimable Therese. (Note: A first-class share of the prize money was worth £ 18 15s 5 3/4d; a fifth-class share, that of a seaman, was worth 11s 8 3/4d.)

Lloyd's List reported on 7 April 1801 that Eugenie had recaptured the brig Juno, Wallace, master. A French privateer had captured Juno near Dungeness as Juno was sailing from Lynn to Penzance. Eugenie sent Juno into Dover. The same privateer had captured a brig carrying corn and sent her into France. Juno was a small, two-year old coasting brig of 72 tons (bm).

In August Eugenie sustained casualties while participating in Lord Nelson's unsuccessful raids on Boulogne. She suffered three seamen killed and one officer and five seamen wounded.

On 26 November the Swedish East Indiaman Sophia Magdalena ran onshore near Kingsdown on the South Foreland. Eugenie and HMS Anacreon came as close as they could and rendered assistance.

In May 1802 Commander Fasham Roby replaced Somerville.

== Fate ==
The "Principal Officers and Commissioners of His Majesty's Navy" offered the "Eugenie sloop, 241 tons", lying at Deptford for sale on 1 December 1802. Mr. Freake finally purchased her on 3 January 1803.
