= Otter (1797 ship) =

History

Great Britain
- Name: Otter
- Owner: 1797:Molyneux; 1800: James Rigby and Francis & William Ingram; 1802:Robert Kitchen; 1805:Robert Kitchen & James Penny
- Builder: Liverpool
- Launched: 1797
- Fate: Abandoned and burned 10 December 1807

General characteristics
- Tons burthen: 270, or 283 (bm)
- Complement: 1798:16; 1800:20; 1805:30
- Armament: 1798:10 × 9-pounder guns; 1800:10 × 9-pounder guns; 1805:18 × 6&9-pounder guns

Otter was launched at Liverpool in 1797, initially as a West Indiaman. She made seven voyages as a slave ship in the triangular trade in enslaved people. During her career she captured one merchantman and recaptured another. She was lost in 1807 on her way back to Britain from her seventh enslaving voyage.

== Career ==
Otter entered Lloyd's Register in 1798 with Underwood, master, Molyneux, owner, and trade Liverpool–Demerara.

1st enslaving voyage (1798–1799): Captain Alexander Grierson acquired a letter of marque on 24 September 1798. He sailed from Liverpool on 29 October. In 1798, 156 vessels sailed from English ports bound on voyages to transport enslaved people; 134 of these vessels sailed from Liverpool.

On the way to Africa Otter was in company with Beaver when they captured a brig sailing to Bilbao with naval stores.

Otter acquired captives at Cabinda and delivered them on 13 June 1799 to Kingston, Jamaica, where she landed 410 captives. She left Kingston on 7 August and arrived back at Liverpool on 30 September. She had left Liverpool with 40 crewmen and suffered four deaths on the voyage.

2nd enslaving voyage (1800–1802): Captain Alexander Hackney acquired a letter of marque on 6 May 1800. He sailed from Liverpool on 26 June, bound for the Bight of Benin. In 1800, 133 vessels sailed from English ports bound on voyages to transport enslaved people; 120 of these vessels sailed from Liverpool.

Otter acquired captives at Porto-Novo. On her way to the Americas she stopped at Príncipe and arrived at Suriname on 18 September 1801. Lloyd's List reported in November 1801 that Allison had been captured while sailing from Newfoundland to the West Indies, but that Beaver and Otter had recaptured her and sent her into Suriname.

At Suriname Otter she landed some 280 captives. She left Suriname on 12 November and arrived back at Liverpool on 5 January 1802. She had left Liverpool with 46 crewmen and suffered five deaths on the voyage.

3rd enslaving voyage (1802): Because Captain Richard Hart sailed during the Peace of Amiens he did not acquire a letter of marque. He sailed from Liverpool 18 April 1802. In 1802, 155 vessels sailed from English ports bound on voyages to transport enslaved people; 122 of these vessels sailed from Liverpool.

Otter acquired captives at the Congo River. She arrived at St Kitts 23 September; there she landed 274 captives. She left on 18 October and arrived back at Liverpool on 23 November. She had left Liverpool with 32 crewmen and suffered only one crew death on the voyage.

4th enslaving voyage (1803–1804): Captain Hart sailed from Liverpool on 25 January 1803, which was still during the Peace of Amiens. In 1803, 99 vessels sailed from English ports bound on voyages to transport enslaved people; 83 of these vessels sailed from Liverpool.

Otter acquired captives at the Congo River. Captain Hart died at the Congo River on 19 May 1803. Captain John Laughton replaced Hart. Otter arrived at Kingston, Jamaica on 3 July 1803 and landed 267 captives. She left Kingston 22 November and arrived back at Liverpool on 4 January 1804. She had left with 30 crewmen and suffered three crew deaths on the voyage.

5th enslaving voyage (1805–1806): war with France had resumed in May 1803. Captain Timothy Boardman acquired a letter of marque on 29 April 1805. He sailed from Liverpool on 5 June.

Otter acquired captives at Gabon and the Cameroons, and delivered 280 to Saint Thomas on 6 March 1806. She then sailed for Liverpool on 6 April and arrived there on 7 July. She had left with 40 crewmen and she suffered five crew deaths on the voyage.

6th enslaving voyage (1806–1807): Captain Boardman sailed from Liverpool on 24 September 1806. Between 1 January 1806 and 1 May 1807, 185 vessels cleared Liverpool outward bound in the slave trade. Thirty of these vessels made two voyages during this period. Of the 155 vessels, 114 were regular slave ships, like Otter having made two voyages during the period, or voyages before 1806.

Otter gathered captives at Gabon and the Cameroons. She stopped at São Tomé before crossing the Atlantic. She arrived at Demerara on 6 July 1807. There she landed 190 captives. She then landed 60 more at Trinidad. She had left Liverpool with 40 crewmen and suffered six crew deaths on the voyage.

Otter had come via Barbados. The Essequebo and Demerary Royal Gazette advertised on 11 July 1807, that "One Hundred and Thirty Prime Ebbo Slaves, per Ship Otter, which will be ready for delivery on [14 July]".

== Fate ==
On 10 December 1807 Otter, Boardman, master, sprang a leak in the Atlantic Ocean. Her crew set her on fire and abandoned her. Otter was on a voyage from Saint Kitts to Liverpool.

By one study, in 1807, 12 British slaves ships were lost. This count does not show any losses on the homeward voyage. Absent histories of individual vessels, it was not always possible to distinguish a homeward-bound West Indiaman from a homeward-bound Guineaman. Still, during the period 1793 to 1807, war, rather than maritime hazards or resistance by the captives, was the greatest cause of vessel losses among British slave vessels.
