= Hired armed cutter Nox =

His Majesty's hired armed cutter Nox served the British Royal Navy under contract from 17 April 1798 to 31 October 1801. She was of 10973/94 tons (bm), and carried twelve 12-pounder carronades.

On 23 May 1799 the hired armed cutter Ann captured Aimable Therese, a small French privateer lugger of four guns and 27 men. (Note: Aimable Thérèse was a privateer lugger from an unknown harbour and had been commissioned earlier that year.) At the time, Ann was in company with the sloop Eugenie and Nox. Nox was under the command of Lieutenant Ulysses Hughes. (Note: A first-class share of the prize money was worth £ 18 15s 5 3/4d; a fifth-class share, that of a seaman, was worth 11s 8 3/4d.)

In October 1799 Nox was under Hughes' command and stationed in the Downs.

On 3 January 1800 Mr George Buckley, Collector of the Customs at Newhaven, received intelligence of a small, suspicious vessel off the harbour. He gathered Mr. Bound, Nox's Mate, some of her crew, his own boatmen, Mr. S. Cooper, master of Unity, some men of the coast artillery, and some other volunteers. The motley assemblage manned the Customs House's boat and four others and set out in chase. They caught up with their quarry after about two hours; the French vessel put a short resistance and then struck her colours. The captured vessel proved to be General Brune, of Dieppe, about 30 tons (bm), and armed with two carriage guns (not mounted), and small arms. She had a crew of 15 men under the command of Citizen Fleury. (Note: Général Brune (ex-Brune), was a privateer of 25 tons (of load) from Bordeaux, recommissioned at Bayonne in 1798. She was originally under Lartigue Mongrué, with four officers 10 to 16 men, and armed with one gun and 4 swivel guns.)

In July Nox, Lieutenant G. Harris, chased a lugger onshore near Boulogne, where the lugger's crew abandoned her. Heavy fire from a nearby battery prevented Harris and his men from taking or destroying the lugger.

In June 1801 Nox was at Weymouth attending the royal family on their annual visit there. While she was there Lieutenant Thomas Ussher assumed command of her. On 14 September Ussher and Nox captured the Swedish brig Louisa Cbarlotta.

Unfortunately, currently available online sources do not make it possible to identify Nox's origins, or her fate after her service with the navy.
