= Allison (1795 ship) =

History

France
- Launched: 1776
- Captured: 1795

Great Britain
- Name: Allison
- Owner: 1795:Harvey & Co.; 1799:Earle & Co.; 1803:Calvert & Co.
- Acquired: 1795 by purchase of a prize
- Fate: Lost c.1846

General characteristics
- Tons burthen: 247, or 250, or 251, or 259 (bm)
- Complement: 1799:15; 1801:15; 1803:25
- Armament: 1799:6 × 6-pounder guns; 1801:8 × 6-pounder guns; 1803:14 × 6-pounder guns

Allison was launched in France in 1776, almost certainly under another name. The British captured her in 1795. Between 1796 and 1799 she made two whaling voyages to the British southern whale fishery. Then between 1799 and 1807 she made three voyages as a slave ship in the triangular trade in enslaved people. Between the first and the second a French privateer captured her, but British letters of marque recaptured her. The British slave trade was abolished in 1807 and thereafter Allison traded primarily as a coaster. After about 1840 she began to trade to America and Africa. She was lost c.1846.

== Career ==
Allison entered Lloyd's Register in 1795 with Masslin, master, Harvey & Co., owners, and trade Falmouth–Archangel. The entry noted that she was a French prize. The 1796 volume showed her master changing to Bernie and her trade to Bristol–Southern Fishery. It also showed her as being built in 1776.

=== Whaling voyages ===
1st whaling voyage (1796–1797): Captain James Birnie sailed from England in 1796, bound for the coast of East Africa. Allison was at Rio de Janeiro in April 1796. Allison, of Bristol, Bernie, master, was at the Cape of Good Hope on 8 November. She returned to England on 19 December 1797.

2nd whaling voyage (1796–1797): Captain Thaddeus Luce sailed from England in 1798. Allison returned to England on 15 February 1799. (Note: Luce captained Robust on a whaling voyage just before taking over command of Allison.)

=== Voyages transporting enslaved people ===
1st voyage transporting enslaved people (1799–1800): Captain Jesse Topping acquired a letter of marque on 10 July 1799. He sailed from Liverpool on 26 August, bound for West Central Africa and St. Helena. In 1799, 156 vessels sailed from English ports, bound for Africa to acquire and transport enslaved people; 134 of these vessels sailed from Liverpool.

Allison arrived in the West Indies on 14 July 1800, landing slaves at Martinique, but primarily at Kingston, Jamaica. In all she landed 375 slaves. She left Kingston on 10 October and arrived back at Liverpool on 23 December. She had left with a crew of 47 men and suffered 10 crew deaths on the voyage.

Capture and recapture: Between her first and second voyages transporting enslaved people, Allison sailed between Liverpool and Newfoundland. Captain Robert Burn acquired a letter of marque on 31 March 1801. Lloyd's List reported on 17 November 1801 that Allison had been captured while sailing from Newfoundland to the West Indies, but that Beaver and Otter had recaptured her and sent her into Suriname. Both Beaver and Otter were slave ships sailing under letters of marque.

2nd voyage transporting enslaved people (1803–1805): Captain James Thompson acquired a letter of marque on 24 September 1803. He sailed from London 3 October. In 1803, 99 vessels sailed from English ports, bound for Africa to acquire and transport enslaved people; 15 of these vessels sailed from Liverpool.

On 27 December she was at 48°24′N 11°32′W when a gale took away her half her rudder and did other damage. In early January Allison was at Minehead with a pilot on board for Bristol. Allison had had to leave the convoy she was in and her escort and make for the nearest port. Allison was almost totally rebuilt in 1804.

Allison acquired captives at Accra and arrived at Demerara on 8 April 1805. There she disembarked 275 captives. At some point M. Roberts replaced Thompson, and (John?) Marman replaced Roberts. She left for London on 11 May.

3rd voyage transporting enslaved people (1806–1807): Captain Diederick Woolbert sailed from London on 18 February 1806, bound for the Gold Coast.

Allison acquired captives at Cape Coast Castle and Accra, and left Africa on 22 August. She arrived at Kingston, Jamaica, on 27 November. There she landed 186 captives. She left Kingston on 17 May 1807, and arrived back at London on 18 July 1807.

=== Trading ===
Year	Master	Owner	Trade	Source and notes
1810	Guthrie	T&R Brown	London transport	Register of Shipping (RS); almost totally rebuilt 1804
1814	Guthrie; Maxwell	T&R Brown	London transport London	RS; almost rebuilt 1804
1820	Maxwell	T&R Brown	Southampton–London	RS; almost rebuilt 1804

On 14 May 1823 Allison, Dixon, master, was coming from Jarrow Steath into Newcastle when she got stuck in sand. She sustained so much damage that she had to transfer her cargo to Mercury, Campbell, master, in order to be able to go into the dock for repairs.

On 12 to 14 October 1824 Allison, Dixon, master, was at Hartlepool when a gale hit the coasts of England. She was one of many vessels driven on shore.

Year	Master	Owner	Trade	Source and notes
1825	Dixon; Hogarth	T&R Brown	Newcastle–London	RS; almost rebuilt 1804, & large repairs 1821 and 1823
1830	Johnson; Waugh	T&R Brown	London coaster	RS; thorough repair 1821, damages repaired 1823, & almost rebuilt 1829
1835	Watts			Lloyd's Register (LR); Homeport Newcastle
1840	W. Brown	Nicolle & Co.	Shields–London; Shields–America	LR; small repair 1837 & large repair 1839
1845	J. Digby; Turner	Nichol & Co. C. Rayne	Shields–America; Shields–Africa	LR;large repair 1839, damages repaired 1843, & small repair 1844
1846	Turner	C. Rayne	Shields–Africa	LR;large repair 1839, damages repaired 1843, & small repair 1844

== Fate ==
Lloyd's Register for 1846 carries the annotation "LOST" by Allison's name.
