= Frederick Campbell (British Army officer, born 1780) =

General Frederick Campbell
- Born: 1780
- Died: 1866 (aged 85–86)
- Military career
- Allegiance: Kingdom of Great Britain (to 1800); United Kingdom (from 1801)
- Branch: (United Kingdom) British Army
- Service years: from 1797
- Rank: General
- Commands: Colonel Commandant of the 6th Battalion, Royal Artillery

Frederick Campbell (1780–1866) was a general in the British army who served in the Napoleonic Wars and subsequently. At the time of his death he was colonel commandant of the 6th Battalion, Royal Artillery.

Campbell's father John (died 1790) was Lieutenant Governor of Fort George. His brothers included Admiral Sir Patrick Campbell and Lieut-General Sir Colin Campbell.

Frederick Campbell entered the Royal Artillery in 1797. He served in the campaign in Egypt under Sir Ralph Abercromby. He was wounded at the debarkation of the troops at Abukir on 21 March 1801.

From 1810–1828 he was garrison quartermaster at Woolwich. He commanded the Royal Artillery in Jamaica from 1833–37, and in Canada from 1838–47. In 1852 he was appointed colonel commandant. He died at Woolwich on 4 April 1866. He was awarded the Egyptian Gold Medal and the war medal and clasp. His portrait can be seen in the National Museums of Scotland.
