= HMS Anacreon (1799) =

Privateer ship

History

France
- Name: Anacréon
- Builder: Naval shipyard at Dunkerque (Dunkirk)
- Laid down: 22 September 1797
- Launched: 1798
- Captured: 22 June 1799

Great Britain
- Name: HMS Anacreon
- Namesake: Greek poet Anacreon
- Acquired: 22 June 1799 (by capture)
- Fate: Sold late 1802

General characteristics
- Type: Ship-sloop
- Tons burthen: 15089/94 (bm)
- Length: Overall: 76 ft 5 1/2 in (23.3 m); Keel: 60 ft 5 1/2 in (18.4 m)
- Beam: 21 ft 8 in (6.6 m)
- Depth of hold: 9 ft 0 in (2.7 m)
- Propulsion: Sails
- Sail plan: Brig
- Complement: Privateer:100-125; British service:60
- Armament: Privateer: 16 guns; British service: 14 × 4-pounder guns

HMS Anacreon was a French privateer launched in 1798 that the Royal Navy captured in 1799 and took into service. She had a brief career in which she took some minor prizes and engaged two enemy vessels in an inconclusive action. She was sold in December 1802.

== French career and capture ==
Anacréon was built in 1798 at Dunkirk by the brother of her first commander, Jean Blankeman, (Note: Blankeman's name is variously reported as "Blanckman", "Blankman", "Blanchman", "Blankeman", "Blackeman", among others.) reportedly to a design by Louis-Jean-Baptiste Bretocq. (Note: Winfield gives the year of building as 1731, but this is clearly incorrect. Not only is it inconsistent with the description that her captor gave and with the designer living and working in the late 18th and early 19th Centuries, but Roche gives the year as 1798.)

In August Anacréon was commissioned under ensigne de vaisseau Blanckman for the Irish campaign, the French support of Irish revolts against the British. She left Dunkirk on 4 September 1798 and on 16 September she delivered the Irish rebel Napper Tandy, General Rae, and some seventy compatriots to the island of Arranmore, northwest of Donegal. The rebels occupied the island of Rutland but discovered that the rebellion they were to join had failed. Anacréon then took her passengers to Bergen. They had wanted to return to Dunkirk, but Blanckman preferred to engage in privateering in the North Sea.

On the way Anacreon captured two British vessels, Langton, which the British recaptured the next day, and Tom, which Anacreon brought with her to Bergen. The two British merchant vessels had been in company when on 19 September they encountered Anacréon, which gave chase. Langton was armed only with a swivel gun, which she fired before surrendering. Tom was armed with eight 9-pounder guns and two 12-pounders and resisted until Anacréon grappled her and boarded. The next day they encountered a British sloop of war. Blanchman ordered the prize crew he had put on board Langton to set fire to her; the one British crew member still on board Langton, a ship's boy, had hid the tinder and so the prize crew did not set the fire. They returned to Anacréon, leaving Inspector to recapture Langton.

On 23 December, Anacréon, Captain Blankman, captured the brigantine Aurora, in the North Sea while she was sailing from Riga to Lisbon. The French took Aurora into North Bergen. James Sime, the late master of Aurora, reported in February 1799 that while he was in Bergen, the crew of Anacréon blackened her sails with coal dust to disguise her as a collier. He described her as a brig of 15 guns and with a crew of 100 men. He also reported that another privateer, the cutter-rigged Perseverance, of ten guns and 45 men, had left to cruise the North Sea the day after Anacréon left.

In the first half of 1799 Blanckmann, in Anacréon, was highly successful as a privateer. He would hang on the flanks of convoys, pick of stragglers, and escape before the convoy's escorts could reach him. In one three-day period he captured six large merchantmen. One month later he was again on the prowl.

On the morning of 26 June 1799, Champion sighted a brig taking possession of two merchant vessels. Champion immediately set out in pursuit; three days and two nights later she captured the privateer brig. She turned out to be the Anacréon, out of Dunkirk. She had a complement of 125 men under the command of Citizen Blankeman, though 74 of her complement were away in prizes that she had already taken on her then current cruise. (Note: Blankeman would go on to further successful privateering cruises in Bellone and Chasseur. Then during the Napoleonic Wars he captained the Contre-Amiral Magon, which Cruizer would capture.) Captain Graham Eden Hammond of Champion described her as "almost a new Vessel, sails remarkably fast, is Copper-bottomed, and seems fit for His Majesty's Service." The Royal Navy took her into service as HMS Anacreon.

== British career ==
Anacreon was commissioned under Lieutenant John Simpson in November 1799.

It's reported on 9 November 1799 in the Hampshire Telegraph and Naval Chronicle that HMS frigate Nemesis, with the Anacreon sloop, and the Nile, Resolution, and Fanny hired armed luggers, have sailed on a cruise off the Coast of France.

On 27 November 1799, the hired armed cutter Kent captured the French lugger privateer Quatre Freres (Four Brothers) five leagues off the North Foreland. Four Brothers was under the command of Citizen Charles Desobier and carried four 4-pounders, swivel guns, small arms, and a crew of 24. She was one day out of Calais and had yet to take any prizes. Kent sent her into Ramsgate. Kent shared the capture with Anacreon.

In January 1800 Lieutenant Grant Allen replaced Simpson as Anacreon patrolled the North Sea. On 1 February Lieutenant Guyon was appointed to command Anacreon.

Whilst under Guyon’s command, Anacreon engaged a French brig and a cutter-of-war off St Valery. On 6 May she captured the schuyt Jonge Catharina, Jacob Kook, master. Also that month she captured five fishing vessels, Françoise, Bonne Nouvelle, Mentor, St Pierre, and Jacques. She was paid off in July, but then returned to service.

On 2 February 1801, still under Guyon’s command, she recaptured Catherine. In June a skirmish took place on the beach at Dungeness between a party of smugglers and the men in Anacreon's boats. The smugglers lost two men killed and two wounded, and 700 tubs of spirits that Anacreon seized and carried into Dover.

On 26 November 1801, the Swedish East Indiaman Sophia Magdalena ran onshore near Kingsdown on the South Foreland. Eugenie and Anacreon came as close as they could and rendered assistance.

== Fate ==
Anacreon was lying at Sheerness when she was put up for sale on 1 December 1802.

By 1804 she may have returned to Dunkirk for fitting out again. There do not appear to be any reports of subsequent privateering voyages though, at least not under her original name.
