= Little Joe (1784 ship) =

British slave ship (1784–1795) launched in Liverpool

History

Great Britain
- Name: Little Joe
- Builder: Liverpool
- Launched: 1784
- Captured: 1793
- Fate: Last listed 1795

General characteristics
- Tons burthen: 127, or 140, or 142 (bm)
- Length: 70 ft 0 in (21.3 m)
- Beam: 21 ft 0 in (6.4 m)
- Complement: 30
- Armament: 10 × 6&4-pounder guns + 6 swivel guns
- Notes: Two decks & three masts

Little Joe was launched in 1784 in Liverpool as a slave ship. She made six complete voyages from Liverpool in the Atlantic triangular slave trade in enslaved people. On her seventh voyage a French privateer captured her, but a British letter of marque recaptured her. She did not return to the slave trade and was last listed in 1795.

== Career ==
Little Joe first appeared in Lloyd's Register (LR) in 1784.

Year	Master	Owner	Trade	Source
1784	R[ober]t Ward	J[oseph] Ward	Liverpool–Africa	LR

1st voyage transporting enslaved people (1784–1785): Captain Robert Ward sailed from Liverpool on 15 June 1784, bound for the Windward Coast. Little Joe arrived at Barbados with 310 captives and sailed for Dominica on 4 January 1785. She was at Dominica on 21 January 1785 with 309 captives. She left Dominica on 18 March and arrived back at Liverpool on 24 April. She had left Liverpool with 37 crew members and had arrived at Dominica with 28. Over her entire voyage she suffered three crew deaths. When Little Joe arrived in Liverpool she reported that she had taken up the crew of the French vessel Providence, which had foundered in the Atlantic Ocean while on a voyage from Charleston to London. Little Joe rescued the crew.

2nd voyage transporting enslaved people (1785–1786): Captain Ward sailed from Liverpool on 19 August 1785, bound for the Windward Coast. Little Joe arrived at Dominica on 17 February 1786 with 307 captives. She arrived back at Liverpool on 3 May. She had left Liverpool with 41 crew members and she had arrived at Dominica with 43. She suffered no crew deaths on the voyage.

3rd voyage transporting enslaved people (1786–1787): Captain Ward sailed from Liverpool on 16 October 1786, bound for the Windward Coast. Little Joe arrived with her captives on 13 June 1787. She first delivered 20 captives to St Kitts. She then delivered 272 to Dominica, and lastly, six to Antigua. She left for Liverpool on 10 July and arrived there on 14 August. she had left Liverpool with 43 crew members and she arrived at St Kitts with 25. She suffered four crew deaths over the entire voyage.

Year	Master	Owner	Trade	Source
1787	R.Ward; A.Grearson	J.Ward	Liverpool–Africa	LR

4th voyage transporting enslaved people (1787–1789): Captain Alexander Grierson sailed from Liverpool on 2 December 1787. Little Joe acquired captives first at Bassa and then elsewhere on the windward Coast before she sailed from Africa on 26 August 1788. She arrived at Grenada on 17 October with 301 captives. She sailed from Grenada on 26 December and arrived back at Liverpool on 22 February 1789. She had left Liverpool with 34 crew members and she had suffered nine crew deaths on her voyage.

Year	Master	Owner	Trade	Source
1789	Grearson; R.Jones	J.Ward	Liverpool–Africa	LR

The Slave Trade Act 1788 (Dolben's Act) was the first British legislation passed to regulate the shipping of enslaved people. The Act limited the number of enslaved people that British ships were allowed to transport, based on the ships' tons burthen. At a burthen of 127 tons, the cap would have been 212 captives.

5th voyage transporting enslaved people (1789–1791): Captain Richard Jones sailed from Liverpool on 31 December 1789. Little Joe acquired captives at Bassa and left Africa on 25 September 1790. She arrived at Black River, Jamaica on 14 November with 146 captives and landed 144. She sailed for Liverpool on 18 December and arrived there on 16 February 1791. She had left Liverpool with 30 crew members and she suffered one crew death on her voyage.

Year	Master	Owner	Trade	Source
1791	R.Jones; W.Simmons	J.Ward	Liverpool–Africa	LR

6th voyage transporting enslaved people (1791–1792): Captain Thomas Bridge sailed from Liverpool on 8 April 1791. Little Joe acquired captives at Bassa and sailed from Africa on 23 February 1792. She arrived at Grenada in March with 206 captives. She arrived back at Liverpool on 23 June. She had left Liverpool with 19 crew members and she suffered six crew deaths on the voyage.

Year	Master	Owner	Trade	Source
1791	W.Simmons; O.Jones	J.Ward	Liverpool–Africa	LR

7th voyage transporting enslaved people (1791–1792): Captain Owen Jones sailed for the Windward Coast on 1 August 1792. He acquired a letter of marque on 21 March 1793, just after the outbreak of war with France.

Capture: The French privateer Liberty, of Bordeaux, captured seven slave ships before July 1793: Union, Little Joe, Echo, Mercury, Hazard, Prosperity, and Swift, Roper, master. Little Joe was captured off the Junk River (now in Liberia). (Note: There was a Liberté, privateer from Bordeaux, that was commissioned in February 1793 under Jacques Laventy with 16 to 20 guns. She was sold in Guadeloupe in June 1793 by a Mister Mehy, and operated under a Captain Le Bas until 1794.)

Robust recaptured Little Joe and Echo. HMS Andromeda recaptured Prosperity; the cutter HMS Seaflower recaptured Mercury. Liberty ransomed Swift after plundering her.

== Fate ==
Little Joe was last listed in Lloyd's Register in 1795, with data unchanged since 1793. The last mention of Little Joe in Lloyd's List occurred in February 1796 when Little Joe, Walsh, master, arrived at Limerick from Oporto.
