= Enterprize (1799 ship) =

History

Great Britain
- Name: Enterprize
- Owner: Shaw & Co.
- Launched: 1794, Spain, or Brazil
- Acquired: 1799
- Captured: circa 1800
- Fate: Sunk after capture

General characteristics
- Tons burthen: 204, or 222 (bm)
- Complement: 20
- Armament: 10 × 6-pounder guns

Enterprize was launched in Spain and taken in prize, or in Brazil. She became a slave ship in the triangular trade in enslaved people, sailing from Liverpool in 1799. French naval vessels captured and sank her before she could embark any captives.

Enterprize first appeared in Lloyd's Register (LR), and the Register of Shipping in 1800.

Year	Master	Owner	Trade	Source & notes
1800	L.Carlisle	Shaw & Co.	Liverpool–Africa	LR
1800	Carlisle	Shaw & Co.	Liverpool–Africa	RS

Captain Ludwick Carlile acquired a letter of marque on 1 February 1799. He sailed from Liverpool on 27 April, intending to acquire captives in West Africa. In 1799, 156 vessels sailed from English ports, bound for Africa to acquire and transport enslaved people; 134 sailed from Liverpool.

In late 1799, or early 1800, three French frigates captured Enterprize, together with Tartar, and Dispatch. The captures took place off the coast at Benin. The French sank the captured vessels. In 1799, 18 British vessels in the triangular trade were lost, five of them on the coast of Africa. In 1800, the comparable numbers were 34 and 20. During the period 1793 to 1807, war, rather than maritime hazards or resistance by the captives, was the greatest cause of vessel losses among British enslaving vessels.
