= Dutch brig Meermin =

History

Dutch Republic
- Name: Meermin
- Builder: Admiralty Zeeland, Flushing
- Launched: 1784
- Fate: Seized 4 March 1796

Great Britain
- Name: HMS Miermen
- Acquired: By seizure on 4 March 1796
- Fate: Sold 31 August 1801

General characteristics
- Tons burthen: 203 (bm)
- Length: 83 Amsterdam feet (Note: All linear measurements are in Amsterdam feet (voet) of 11 Amsterdam inches (duim) (see Dutch units of measurement). The Amsterdam foot is about 8% shorter than an English foot. The basis of measurement is also different. The data is from Winfield and Van Maanen.)
- Beam: 28 Amsterdam feet
- Depth of hold: 11 6/11 Amsterdam feet
- Propulsion: Sails
- Sail plan: Brig
- Complement: 86
- Armament: Dutch service:16-18 guns; British service:16 × 6-pounder guns

The Dutch naval brig Meermin was built at Flushing; the Zeeland Admiralty purchased her in 1784. The British Royal Navy seized her in 1796. The Royal Navy named her HMS Miermen and registered but never commissioned her; it sold her in 1801.

On 9 March 1793, Meerman, of Zeeland, Captain Cornelis Schalk, captured Frende Suskene, John Thomsen, master, off Walcheren. Frende Suskene, of and from Christiansand, was on her way to Ostend or Calais with deals, balks, and users. Lieutenant S. Oudekesk Pool brought her into Dover the next day.

In 1795, at the time of the Batavian Revolution the British Admiralty sent a messenger to Plymouth on 20 January 1795, to the admiral there to detain all Dutch vessels in port. There were six naval vessels, Meerman among them. (Initial British press reports referred to her as Steerman.) There were also six homeward-bound East Indiamen, three outward-bound East Indiamen, and some 60 to 70 other merchant vessels. Vice Admiral Sir Richard Onslow and the British Royal Navy took possession 4 March 1796. The crews were removed from their vessels and taken to prison ships. In September orders arrived at Plymouth that the Dutch naval vessels be equipped for immediate service.

The Navy named and registered Miermen on 25 October 1796, but never commissioned her. The "Principal officers and commissioners of His Majesty's Navy" offered Miermen for sale on 31 August 1801. She sold on that day for £160.
