= HMS Ocean (1805) =

1805 ship of the line of the Royal Navy

History

United Kingdom
- Name: HMS Ocean
- Ordered: 4 May 1797
- Builder: Woolwich Dockyard
- Laid down: 1 October 1792
- Launched: 24 October 1805
- Fate: Broken up, 1875
- Notes: Depot ship from 1841

General characteristics
- Class & type: 98-gun second rate ship of the line
- Tons burthen: 227649/94 (bm)
- Length: 196 ft (60 m)(gundeck)
- Beam: 51 ft (16 m)
- Depth of hold: 21 ft 6 in (6.55 m)
- Propulsion: Sails
- Sail plan: Full-rigged ship
- Armament: 98 guns: Gundeck: 28 × 32 pdrs; Middle gundeck: 30 × 18 pdrs; Upper gundeck: 30 × 18 pdrs; Quarterdeck: 8 × 12 pdrs; Forecastle: 2 × 12 pdrs

HMS Ocean was a 98-gun second-rate ship of the line of the Royal Navy, launched from Woolwich Dockyard on 24 October 1805. She was the only ship built to her draught, and designed by Sir John Henslow.

She was converted to serve as a depot ship in 1841, and was eventually broken up in 1875. Her figurehead is preserved at Queenborough, Kent.
