= Prosperity (1788 ship) =

Slave ship 1788–1794

History

Great Britain
- Name: Prosperity
- Launched: 1788, Strangford
- Captured: 1793 & 1794

General characteristics
- Tons burthen: 100, or 101, or 105, or 108 (bm)
- Notes: Fir sides

Prosperity was a slave ship launched in Strangford, Ireland in 1788. She traded in the area and then to Dominica. From 1792, she made two voyages in the Atlantic triangular slave trade. On both voyages French privateers captured her. In the first case, the Royal Navy recaptured her and she completed her voyage. In the second case, her captor sent her into France.

== Career ==
Prosperity first appeared in Lloyd's Register in 1789.

Year	Master	Owner	Trade	Source
1789	E.Conway	Strangford	Bordeaux–Dublin	LR
1791	J.Conway; T.Feagan	Potter & Co.	Liverpool–Strangford	LR
1792	Feagan; Churnside; R.Kelsall	Potter & Co. Boyle & Co.	Liverpool–Strangford; Belfast–Dominica	LR
1793	R.Kelsall	R.Ward & Co	Liverpool–Africa	LR

Capture (1793): Captain Richard Kelsall sailed from Liverpool on 3 November 1792. The French privateer Liberty, of Bordeaux, captured seven slave ships before July 1793: Prosperity, Echo, Union, Little Joe, Mercury, Hazard, and Swift, Captain Roper. (Note: There was a Liberté, privateer from Bordeaux, that was commissioned in February 1793 under Jacques Laventy with 16 to 20 guns. She was sold in Guadeloupe in June 1793 by a Mister Mehy, and operated under a Captain Le Bas until 1794.)

HMS Andromeda recaptured Prosperity, which arrived at Barbados.

Capture (1794): Captain Kelsall sailed from Liverpool on 14 August 1794.

In December 1794, Lloyd's List reported that Prosperity, captained by Richard Kelsall, was captured on a voyage from Liverpool to Africa, and taken to France. The capture took place before Prosperity had embarked any slaves.
