= Hermione-class frigate (Royal Navy) =

The Hermione-class frigate was a 32-gun 5th-rate frigate class of 6 ships designed by Edward Hunt based on his Active-class frigate, approved on 25 March 1780. The initial design was modified after the first two ships to raise the waist, and all were officially referred to as the Andromeda Class.

== Ships in class ==
- HMS Hermione 1782 – seized by mutineers on 22 September 1797, given to the Spanish garrison at La Guaira, cut out of the harbour and retaken on 25 October 1799, renamed Retaliation shortly after, renamed Retribution in 1800, presented to Trinity House in 1803
- HMS Druid 1783 – fitted as troopship from 1798 to 1805, broken up 1813
- HMS Andromeda 1784 – broken up 1811
- HMS Penelope 1783 – broken up 1797
- HMS Aquilon 1786 – broken up 1816
- HMS Blanche 1786 – wrecked in the entrance to the Texel
