= John Brisbane =

Scottish physician

- Died: 1776
- Education: University of Edinburgh
- Occupations: Physician; author
- Known for: Select Cases in the Practice of Medicine; Anatomy of Painting
- Scientific career
- Fields: Medicine

John Brisbane (d. 1776 ?) was a Scottish physician.

Brisbane graduated M.D. at Edinburgh in 1750, and was admitted licentiate of the College of Physicians in 1766. He held the post of physician to the Middlesex Hospital from 1758 till 1773, when he was superseded for being absent without leave. His name disappears from the college list in 1776. He was the author of 'Select Cases in the Practice of Medicine,' 8vo, 1762, and 'Anatomy of Painting, with an Introduction giving a short View of Picturesque Anatomy,' fol. 1769. This work contains the six Tables of Albinus, the Anatomy of Celsus, with notes, and the Physiology of Cicero.
