= Mercury (1793 ship) =

History

Great Britain
- Name: Mercury
- Acquired: 1793
- Captured: 1794
- Fate: Recaptured, but leaves records in 1794

General characteristics
- Tons burthen: 126 (bm)

Mercury's origins are obscure. She may have been launched in New York in 1774, possibly under another name. In 1793 she made one voyage as a slave ship in the Atlantic triangular slave trade. A French privateer captured Mercury, but the Royal Navy recaptured her.

== Career ==
A Mercury of 126 ton (bm) first appeared in Lloyd's Register (LR), in 1793.

| Year | Master | Owner | Trade | Source |
|---|---|---|---|---|
| 1793 | Lockhart | J.Taylor | London–Antigua | LR |

Capture (1793): Captain George Hauit sailed from Liverpool on 1 January 1793. Mercury gathered slaves at Bance Island. She sailed from Africa on 7 August.

The French privateer Liberty, of Bordeaux, captured seven slave ships before July 1793: Mercury, Hewitt, master, Echo, Union, Little Joe, Prosperity, Hazard, and Swift, Roper, master. Mercury was captured off Cape Mount. (Note: There was a Liberté, privateer from Bordeaux, that was commissioned in February 1793 under Jacques Laventy with 16 to 20 guns. She was sold in Guadeloupe in June 1793 by a Mister Mehy, and operated under a Captain Le Bas until 1794.)

The cutter HMS Seaflower recaptured Mercury. In December 1793 Lloyd's List reported that Mercury, Hewitt, master, had arrived at Barbados. (Note: The Transatlantic Slave Trade database reports that after her capture: "Slaves embarked, transhipped or no further record". It does not note the arrival in Barbados.)

Captain Hewitt purchased the recaptured Mercury.
