= Tartar (1799 ship) =

History

Great Britain
- Builder: France
- Launched: 1784
- Acquired: 1799 by purchase of a prize
- Captured: 1799

General characteristics
- Tons burthen: 506 (bm)
- Sail plan: Schooner
- Complement: 60
- Armament: 26 × 9=pounder guns

Tartar was built in Spain in 1784, almost certainly under another name. She was taken in prize and appears under British ownership in 1799. She became a slave ship sailing from Liverpool in the triangular trade in enslaved people. She was captured in late 1799 on her first enslaving voyage before she was able to embark any captives.

== Career ==
Captain John Sowerby acquired a letter of marque on 22 May 1799. Tartar sailed from Liverpool on 4 July 1799. In 1799, 156 British vessels sailed from British ports, bound on voyages to transport enslaved people; 134 of these vessels sailed from Liverpool. That said, Tartar did not appear on lists of British vessels that cleared from British ports bound for Africa.

At some point, Tartar's master changed to Hewitt. Tartar never appeared in Lloyd's Register and only appeared in the Register of Shipping (RS) in 1800.

Year	Master	Owner	Trade	Source & notes
1800	Hewitt	Joseph & Co.	Liverpool–Africa	RS; small repairs 1799

In late 1799 three French frigates captured Tartar, Hewitt, master, on the Windward Coast, together with three other slavers. The French put the crews aboard one of them, Diana, and sent her back to Liverpool. A later report stated that the French sank Tartar, Enterprize, and Dispatch. Tartar's entry in the Register of Shipping bears the annotation "captured". Diana arrived back at Liverpool on 8 January 1800. (Note: Diana, of 252 tons (bm), Sillars, master, had been launched in London in 1786. She had made three earlier enslaving voyages.)

In 1799, 18 British enslaving ships were lost; seven were lost on their way to Africa. During the period 1793 to 1807, war, rather than maritime hazards or resistance by the captives, was the greatest cause of vessel losses among British slave vessels.
