= Hazard (1779 ship) =

British merchant and slave ship 1779–1793

History

Great Britain
- Name: Hazard
- Launched: 1779, Bermuda
- Captured: 1793

General characteristics
- Tons burthen: 126, or 138, or 150, or 152, or 160 (bm)
- Length: 69 ft 8 in (21.2 m)
- Beam: 21 ft 0 in (6.4 m)
- Complement: 25
- Armament: 8 × 4-pounder guns
- Notes: Two decks & three masts

Hazard was launched in 1779 in Bermuda. In 1787 she sailed to Liverpool and commenced trading from there, particularly to West Africa. In 1791 she became a slave ship, making one complete voyage in the Atlantic triangular slave trade. On her second voyage a French privateer captured her in 1793.

== Career ==
Hazard first appeared in Lloyd's Register (LR), in 1787. In the late 1780s and early 1790s, Hazard sailed to Africa, including the Îles de Los. There was no sign, however, that she was engaged in the slave trade.

Year	Master	Owner	Trade	Source
1787	Reynolds	Capt.&Co.	Liverpool–Africa	LR
1789	Reynolds	Capt.&Co. Sellar & Co.	Africa–Liverpool; Liverpool–Africa	LR
1791	J.Reynolds; A.Forrest	Sellar & Co. W.Begg & Co.	Liverpool–Africa	LR

1st slave trading voyage (1791–1792): Captain Archibald Forest sailed from Liverpool on 4 June 1791, bound for West Africa. Hazard started acquiring slaves on 3 September at Cameroon. She departed Africa on 28 February 1792 and arrived at Jamaica on 28 April. She had embarked 218 slaves and arrived with 169, for a 22% mortality rate. She sailed from Jamaica on 11 June and arrived at Liverpool on 31 July. She had left Liverpool with 24 crew members and she suffered seven crew deaths on the voyage.

2nd slave trading voyage (1792–Loss): Captain Gilbert Rigby sailed from Liverpool on 27 September 1792. He was issued a letter of marque on 24 April 1793, shortly after the outbreak of war with France.

== Capture ==
The French privateer Liberty, of Bordeaux, captured seven slave ships before July 1793: Hazard, Echo, Union, Little Joe, Mercury, Prosperity, and Swift, Roper, master. Hazard was captured off Cape Mount. (Note: There was a Liberté, privateer from Bordeaux, that was commissioned in February 1793 under Jacques Laventy with 16 to 20 guns. She was sold in Guadeloupe in June 1793 by a Mister Mehy, and operated under a Captain Le Bas until 1794.)
