= Roebuck (1799 ship) =

History

Great Britain
- Name: Unknown
- Namesake: Male roe deer
- Builder: London
- Launched: 1784
- Renamed: Roebuck (1799)
- Fate: Condemned April 1806

General characteristics
- Tons burthen: 201, or 206 (bm)
- Complement: 24
- Armament: 1799: 2 × 6-pounder + 4 × 4-pounder guns; 1800: 14 × 6&4-pounder guns

Roebuck was a ship built on the Thames in 1784, almost certainly under another name. She first appeared as Roebuck in 1799 sailing as a West Indiaman. Between 1800 and 1802 she made three voyages as a slave ship in the triangular trade in enslaved people. After the three voyages she became a West Indiaman. She was condemned in 1806.

== Career ==
Roebuck first appeared in Lloyd's Register (LR) under that name in 1799.

Year	Master	Owner	Trade	Source
1799	M'Iiver	Boadman	London–Berbice	LR
1800	M'Iver	Bodman	London–Berbice	LR
1801	M'Iver; R.Vaughn	VanSpan; Swanzy	Cork–London; London–Africa	LR

Roebuck made three voyages as a slave ship before this was reflected in LR.

1st slave voyage (1800–1801): Captain Daniel Neal acquired a letter of marque on 19 April 1800. Captain Neale sailed from London on 30 April 1800, bound for the Gold Coast. Roebuck acquired captives first at Cape Coast Castle and then at Wiamba. She arrived at Demerara on 3 December with 214 captives. Roebuck, Neale, master, was sold there. She arrived back at London on 14 April 1801. At some point her master had changed to Phillips, and then to Toole.

2nd slave voyage (1801–1802): Captain Richard Vaughn sailed from London on 7 June 1801, bound for the Gold Coast. Roebuck arrived in Demerara on 15 December. She arrived back in London on 17 February 1802.

3rd slave voyage (1802): Captain Vaughn sailed from London on 21 April 1802, bound for the Gold Coast. Roebuck began gathering captives in Africa on 24 June. She arrived at Demerara on 15 October with 219 captives and with Barnett, master. She arrived back at London 29 December 1802.

Year	Master	Owner	Trade	Source & notes
1805	Vaughn; Strannach	Swansea & Co. Simpson & Co.	London–Africa	LR; small repairs 1802, & damages and small repairs 1805

== Fate ==
Roebuck, Strannack, master, was on her way from Antigua to London when she put into St Kitts on 28 April 1806, leaky. It was expected that she would have to discharge some of her cargo. The next report was that she had been condemned at St Kitts. Her cargo was transshipped on George, Derbyshire, master.
