= HMS Falcon (1782) =

Brig of the Royal Navy

HMS Falcon was a fourteen gun brig sloop launched on 23 September 1782 from Hills Yard in Sandwich. She was expended as a fireship in the raid on Dunkirk on 7 July 1800 Her crew, under Captain Butt, shared with nineteen other ships the prize money awarded for the cutting out of the French frigate La Diserée during the same operation.
