= Patrick Campbell (Royal Navy officer) =

British Royal Navy officer

Vice-Admiral Sir Patrick Campbell KCB
- Born: 1773; Argyll, Scotland
- Died: 13 October 1841 (aged 67–68); Leamington Spa, Warwickshire
- Military career
- Allegiance: United Kingdom
- Branch: Royal Navy
- Service years: 1780s to 1838
- Rank: Royal Navy Vice-Admiral
- Commands: HMS Ariadne; HMS Doris; HMS Unite; HMS Ocean; HMS Thalia; Cape of Good Hope Station
- Conflicts: French Revolutionary Wars; Capture of Désirée; Napoleonic Wars
- Awards: Knight Commander of the Order of the Bath

Vice-Admiral Sir Patrick Campbell, KCB (1773 – 13 October 1841) was a senior British Royal Navy officer of the early nineteenth century who was distinguished by his service in the French Revolutionary and Napoleonic Wars. During his service in a number of ships in the Mediterranean and English Channel, Campbell saw several small ship actions and was successful in every one, even surviving a double shipwreck in 1805. Following the war, Campbell retired for ten years before returning to service, later commanding at the Cape of Good Hope.

== Naval career ==
Campbell was born in 1773, the son of Colonel John and Colina Campbell of Melfort, Argyll. One of his younger brothers was to become the celebrated British Army general Sir Colin Campbell and another was General Frederick Campbell. Patrick Campbell went to sea at a young age and, following the outbreak of the French Revolutionary War, was promoted to lieutenant in 1794. In 1797, Campbell was again promoted, this time to commander. Between 1798 and mid-1799 he was captain of the floating battery HMS Firm. Next he took over the sloop HMS Dart in the English Channel.

Dart was an experimental ship, designed to operate in coastal waters at close range, she carried 30 carronades but no long guns, and her armament proved highly successful in an attack on Dunkirk in 1800 in which Dart was able to come alongside the larger and better armed French frigate Désirée, fire into her and bring her out of the harbour successfully, despite the enemy having numerous advantages over the British sloop. For this operation, Campbell was promoted to post captain and given command of the frigate HMS Ariadne.

In 1803, Campbell moved to HMS Doris and commanded her until she was wrecked on 21 January 1806 on a rock in Quiberon Bay. The crew successfully escaped to the nearby ship of the line HMS Tonnant, but in transferring from Tonnant to the blockading squadron's flagship, the small boat he was in overturned and Captain Jervis of Tonnant was drowned. Campbell was rescued from the water and later took over the frigate HMS Unite, commanding her in the Adriatic.

In 1811, Campbell was given command of the ship of the line HMS Leviathan in the Mediterranean, in which he saw out the war. In 1815, Campbell entered temporary retirement and was made a Companion of the Bath. He remained at his estate in Warwickshire until 1824, when he returned to the sea as captain of the ship of the line HMS Ganges with the Home Fleet. The following year he married Margaret Wauchope, with whom he had two children; Patrick John Campbell, who became a general in the Royal Artillery, and Colin Campbell who served in the Royal Navy.

In 1827, Campbell took HMS Ocean to reinforce Edward Codrington in the Mediterranean but arrived too late to take part in the Battle of Navarino Bay. In 1830, Ocean was paid off and the same year Campbell was promoted to rear-admiral. Between 1834 and 1837, he flew his flag in HMS Thalia as the commander-in-chief at the Cape of Good Hope Station and was knighted in 1836. Following retirement in 1837, Campbell settled at Leamington Spa and was raised to vice-admiral. He died on 13 October 1841 at his home.

== Notes ==
Military offices
| Preceded by Frederick Warren | Commander-in-Chief, Cape of Good Hope Station; 1834–1837 | Succeeded by George Elliot |
