= HMS Dart (1796) =

Sloop of the Royal Navy

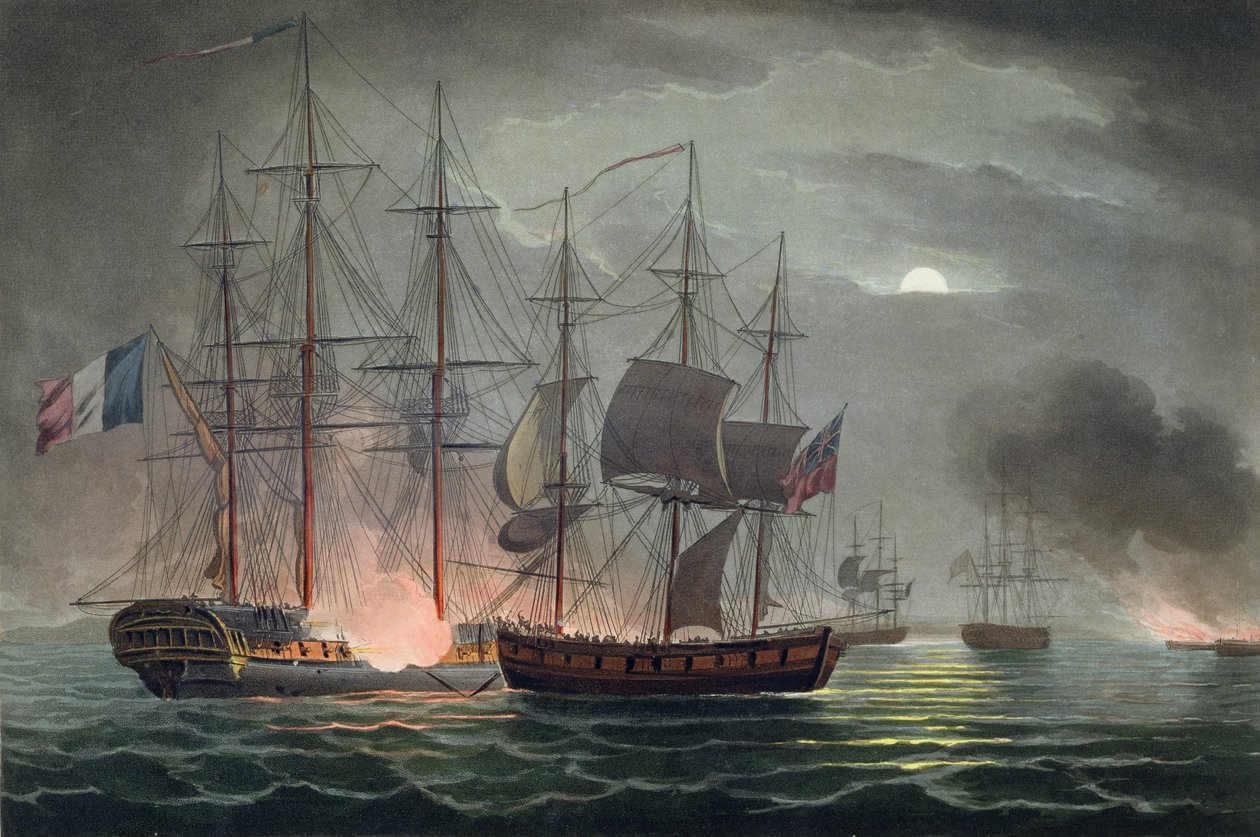
- Dart capturing Désirée on 7 July 1800

History

Great Britain
- Name: HMS Dart
- Builder: Hobbs & Hellyer, Redbridge
- Laid down: 1796
- Honours and awards: Naval General Service Medal with clasps; "Capture of the Désirée"; "Copenhagen 1801"
- Fate: Broken up 1809

General characteristics
- Type: Experimental design
- Tons burthen: 148 (bm)
- Length: 80 ft 0 in (24.4 m) (overall); 56 ft 7 1/2 in (17.3 m) (keel)
- Beam: 22 ft 2 in (6.8 m)
- Depth of hold: 11 ft 6 in (3.5 m)
- Sail plan: Sloop
- Complement: 121; later 140
- Armament: Originally: Upper deck (UD): 24 × 32-pounder carronades; QD: 2 × 32-pounder carronades (two more were added later); Fc: 2 × 32-pounder carronades; Later: UD: 18 × 32-pounder carronades; QD: nil; Fc: 2 × 6-pounder guns; All carronades were an experimental design of 24 cwt by Sadler

HMS Dart was one of two sloops built to an experimental design by Sir Samuel Bentham and launched in 1796. She served the Royal Navy during the French Revolutionary wars and the early part of the Napoleonic Wars before being sold in 1809 for breaking up.

== Design ==
Hobbs & Hellyer built six vessels to Bentham's design. Dart was the second of a two-vessel class of vessels that the Royal Navy classed as sloops, and she and her classmate Arrow were the largest of the six vessels. The design featured a large breadth-to-length ratio, structural bulkheads, and sliding keels. The vessels were also virtually double-ended.

== French Revolutionary Wars ==
Dart was commissioned in August 1796 under Commander Richard Raggett.

On 8 May 1798 Dart participated in Admiral Home Popham's expedition to Ostend to destroy the sluice gates of the Bruge canal. The expedition landed 1,300 British Army soldiers under the command of Major General Coote. The troops burnt the ships in the harbour and blew up the locks and gates on the Canal, but were then forced to surrender as adverse winds prevented their re-embarkation.

In May 1799 Commander Patrick Campbell replaced Raggett. Campbell was in command when Dart was among the vessels that participated in what became known as the Vlieter Incident. On 30 August a squadron of the navy of the Batavian Republic, commanded by Rear-Admiral Samuel Story, surrendered to the British navy. The incident occurred during the Anglo-Russian invasion of Holland and took place near Wieringen on a sandbank near the channel between Texel and the mainland that was known as De Vlieter.

Around this time Dart captured the sloop Jonge Jan. Dart also shared with gunboats Defender, Cracker, and Hasty in the proceeds of the capture of the Hell Hound. This may have occurred on 7 October when the boats of Dart, Defender, Cracker, and Hasty, and the schuyt Isis cut out four gunboats from the Pampus, in the Zuiderzee. Three of the gunboats were schuyts, but one was a new, purpose-built gunboat armed with two 18-pounder guns in her bow and two 18-pounder carronades in her broadside. The three schuyts also carried four guns and carronades each. The vessels had crews ranging in size from 20 to 30 men. The British suffered no casualties.

On 8 May 1800 Dart captured the Kaufhandel.

Dart, captured the French frigate Désirée on 8 July 1800 in the raid on Dunkirk. Désirée was armed with 40 guns, those on the main deck being 24-pounder guns, and had a crew of 250 men under the command of Citizen Deplancy. However, a number of her crew were on shore. Dart lost one man killed and 13 wounded, including two officers badly wounded. Although several other vessels that participated in the raid had some wounded, Dart's capture of Desiree was the raid's only real accomplishment. This capture resulted in Campbell's promotion to post captain and command of the frigate Ariadne. French casualties were heavy. One account states that all the French officers, save a midshipman, were killed, and that casualties amounted to almost 100 men killed and wounded. Lloyd's List reported on 11 July that "Grand Desiree", prize to Dart, had arrived in the Downs, and that the French captain and about 50 men had been killed, and nine wounded. The French commander was capitaine de frégate Lefebvre de Plancy, and French records show that he was mortally wounded in the action.

The Royal Navy took Desiree into service, and many British vessels shared in the proceeds of the capture. In 1847 the Admiralty issued the NGSM with clasp "Capture of the Désirée" to all surviving claimants from the raid.

Commander John Ferris Devonshire replaced Campbell in August 1800.

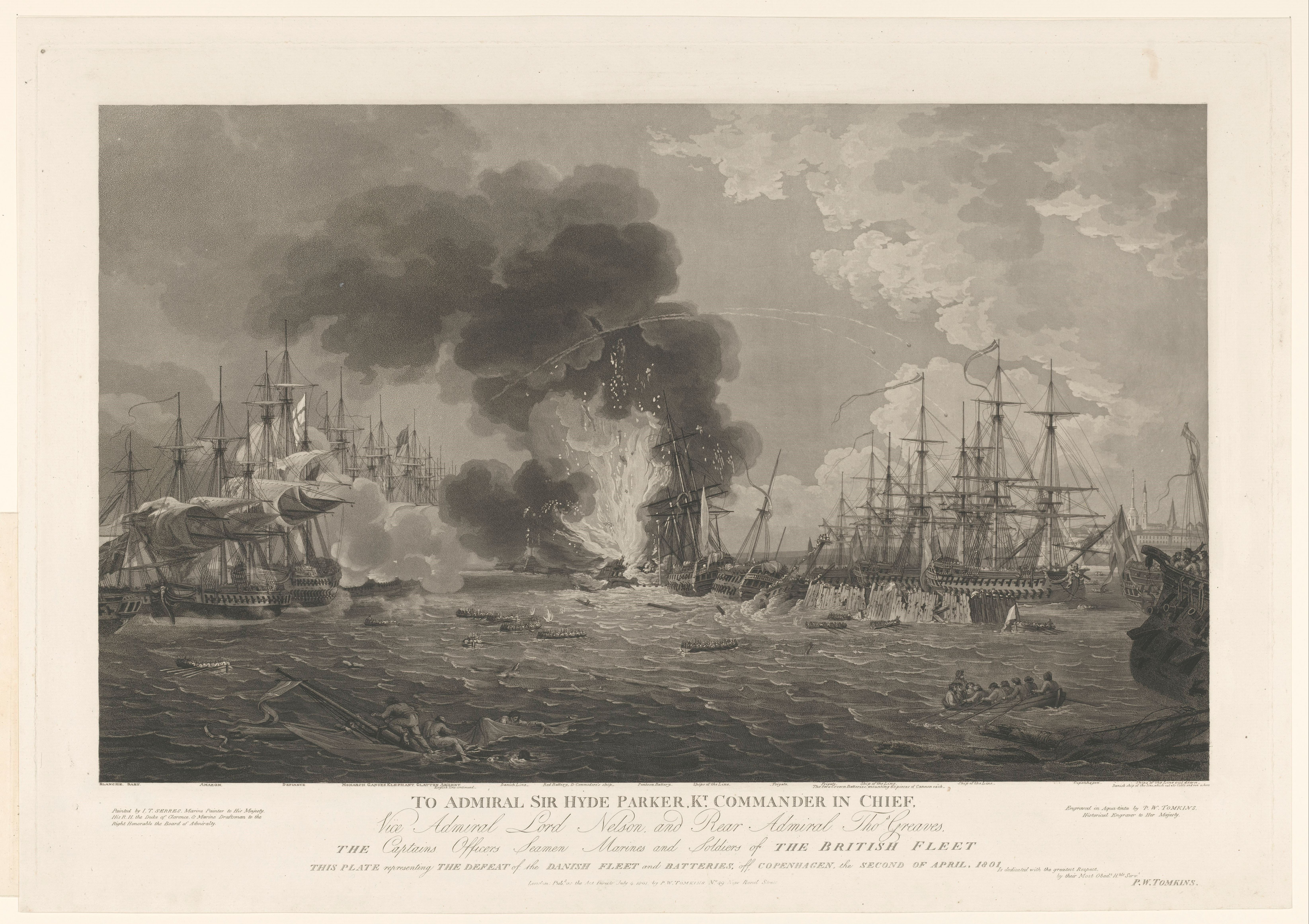
Dart at Copenhagen, 1801

Dart participated in the Battle of Copenhagen where she had an officer and two men killed, and one man wounded. In 1847 the Admiralty awarded the NGSM with clasp "Copenhagen 1801" to all surviving claimants from the action. The Admiralty promoted Devonshire to post captain on 27 April for his role in the battle. In June Lieutenant William Homan (acting) replaced Devonshire.

In October 1801 Commander William Bolton replaced Holmann. Bolton paid off Dart in October 1802.

== Napoleonic wars ==
Dart was fitted at Deptford between August and November 1803. Commander William Brownrigg commissioned her there in October, for the Downs.

On 8 December 1804 Home Popham, in Antelope, sent Dart to provide support to the explosion ship Susannah and two carcasses in their attack against Fort Rouge and the pile battery there that protected the entrance to Calais. (Note: Fort Rouge was a seafort, built of wood and standing on piles. It was armed with 12 cannons and had a garrison of 50 soldiers.) The carcasses were intended to set fire to the piles, but one carcass did not reach its target and the other, though it reached the piles, did not ignite and was retrieved. Susannah did reach its target. When it exploded it destroyed much of the west part of Fort Rouge, according to report from the cutter Fox which sailed in the next day on a reconnaissance.

Brownrigg died in December 1805. Commander Joseph Spear was appointed to command Dart in January 1806. However, for much of the first half of the year he was acting captain of Admiral Sir Alexander Cochrane's flagship, the 74-gun HMS Northumberland. Spear took part in the pursuit of a French squadron in June 1806 which had recently arrived in the Caribbean under Jean-Baptiste Philibert Willaumez. Spear then briefly became acting captain of the 74-gun HMS Agamemnon. During this time Dart was under the command of Commander James Brown.

Around this time Dart recaptured the Caledonia and sent her into Antigua. Caledonia had been sailing from New Brunswick to Antigua when a French privateer had captured her and sent her to Cayenne.

After Spear returned to command Dart, with Wolverine in company, captured the 8-gun schooner privateer Jeune Gabriella on 9 November 1806 at 12°45′N 57°5′W. Jeune Gabriella had thrown half her guns overboard during the chase. She was under the command of M. Auguste Boufford and had a crew of 75 men. She was out of Guadeloupe and had not made any captures. (Note: Many accounts state that on 12 November Dart and Wolverine captured the French 1-gun privateer Marianne. These records are incorrect. The captor was Grenada.)

On 30 November there occurred an unfortunate incident when Wolverine fired on a British merchant vessel engaged in lawful trade. At 10 pm, she and Dart came upon a ship that they suspected was a French privateer and that kept up a running fight until morning, only surrendering after her captain and several of her crew had been wounded, of whom six later died. The vessel turned out to be the British 24-gun slaver Mary, out of Liverpool, under Captain Hugh Crow. (Note: The slave trade was not, in 1806, illegal. The British Slave Trade Act 1807 abolished the trade by degrees, beginning in 1807.) He had thought that the two vessels chasing him in the dark were French privateers out of Cayenne and was determined not to surrender his vessel without a fight. Commander Spear gave him a letter of praise for his determined resistance and the fight became something of a sensation; on his return home Crow received honour, glory and a substantial reward for his gallantry. Also, "many of the wretched negroes were killed or injured." (Note: Crow was a slaver who had earlier fought in two other engagements. The French vessel Robuste, of twenty-four 12-pounders and 150 men, had captured him in 1794. Then on 21 February 1800, as captain of Will, of eighteen 6-pounders and 50 men, he fought off a French privateer with the loss of three crewmen and two slaves killed and 10 wounded. He recounts his career and the fights in detail in his autobiography (Crow 1970).)

In January 1808 Lieutenant Thomas Pinto was promoted to commander and given command of Dart. He took command on 9 February; he paid her off in November.

== Fate ==
Dart was broken up at Barbados in 1809.

A statement during a Parliamentary debate in 1811 reports that, before she was broken up, Dart was serving as a guard ship in Carlisle harbour. One evening, while her captain was ashore, a seaman under confinement for disorderly behavior started making a great deal of noise. The officer on duty, a Lieutenant William Richards, had the man gagged which had the unintended result of the man dying, presumably of suffocation. The subsequent court martial acquitted Richards of murder, but dismissed him from the service.
