= HMS Andromeda (1784) =

32-gun Royal Navy frigate

- Andromeda

History

Great Britain
- Name: HMS Andromeda
- Ordered: 20 January 1781
- Builder: John Sutton & Co, Liverpool
- Laid down: May 1781
- Launched: 21 April 1784
- Completed: By May 1788
- Fate: Broken up in September 1811

General characteristics
- Class & type: Hermione-class fifth rate frigate
- Tons burthen: 71436/94 (bm)
- Length: 129 ft (39.3 m) (gundeck); 106 ft 9 3/4 in (32.6 m) (keel)
- Beam: 35 ft 5 1/2 in (10.8 m)
- Depth of hold: 12 ft 7 in (3.8 m)
- Sail plan: Full-rigged ship
- Complement: 220
- Armament: Upper gundeck: 26 × 12-pounder guns; QD: 4 × 6-pounder guns + 4 × 18-pounder carronades; Fc: 2 × 6-pounder guns + 2 × 18-pounder carronades

HMS Andromeda was a 32-gun Hermione-class fifth rate frigate of the Royal Navy. She was laid down in 1781 and launched in 1784 . She was commissioned for the first time in 1788 when Captain Prince William Henry took command of her and sailed for the West Indies. Prince William Henry paid her off in 1789 and she was not commissioned again until 1790 in response to the Spanish Armament. In 1792 Andromeda joined the Royal Navy's Evolution Squadron in the English Channel before sailing for the Leeward Islands where she stayed until the end of 1793 when Captain Lord Northesk brought her home. She was refitted for much of 1794 before in September joining the Downs Station. Captain William Taylor assumed command in 1795, briefly sailing her to Newfoundland before returning to the North Sea Fleet in 1796. She stayed here for 3 years, seizing the 36-gun Batavian frigate Zefir in the Firth of Forth in March 1798 and participating in the Raid on Dunkirk in July 1800. After another period of service in the Leeward Islands Andromeda returned home at the Peace of Amiens and was laid up at Portsmouth Dockyard where she was broken up in September 1811.

== Construction ==
Andromeda was a 32-gun, 12-pounder Hermione-class frigate designed by Edward Hunt. Her class was designed as a lengthened version of the Active-class frigate. There were six ships in the Hermione class but after the construction of the first two the design was changed to raise the waist of the ships and as Andromeda was the first ship built to these new specifications the rest of the class was named after her.

Andromeda was ordered to be built at Liverpool by John Sutton & Co. on 20 January 1781. She was laid down in May of the same year and launched on 21 April 1784 with the following dimensions: 129 feet (39.3 m) along the gun deck, 106 feet 9 3/4 inches (32.6 m) at the keel, with a beam of 35 feet 5 1/2 inches (10.8 m) and a depth in the hold of 12 feet 7 inches (3.8 m). She measured 714 36/94 tons burthen. The fitting out process for Andromeda was completed at Plymouth on 16 May 1788 after an almost four-year wait.

== Service ==
She was first commissioned in March 1788, under the command of Captain Prince William Henry, the future King William IV. Andromeda joined the North America Station in June of the same year before sailing south for Port Royal on 15 November where the prince was presented with a number of expensive gifts by the House of Assembly on 2 December. She was paid off in July 1789, with the captain created Duke of Clarence and transferred to command the ship of the line HMS Valiant. Andromeda then received a refit at Portsmouth Dockyard between July and August 1790 and was recommissioned by Captain John Salisbury at the same time as part of the reaction to the Spanish Armament. When this crisis began to cool in September she was again paid off, receiving another refit between December 1791 and March 1792, this time at Plymouth Dockyard. She was then sent, under the command of Salisbury again, to join the Evolution, or Experimental, Squadron in the west of the English Channel.

Some time after this Andromeda sailed for the Leeward Islands Station where, in July 1793, Lloyd's List reported that she had recaptured the slave ship Prosperity, Captain Kelsall, which the French privateer Liberty had captured. Andromeda brought Prosperity into Barbados. At the end of the year Andromeda sailed from the Leeward Islands to England under the command of Captain Lord Northesk, where she was paid off. She was then refitted at Plymouth between June and September 1794 and recommissioned under the command of Captain Thomas Sotheby to serve on the Downs Station.

In June 1795 Captain William Taylor assumed command of Andromeda when Sotheby left to command the ship of the line HMS Bombay Castle; under him she sailed to Newfoundland on 24 May 1796 before returning to serve in the North Sea Fleet primarily off the coast of Scotland. Here she seized the 36-gun Batavian frigate Zefir alongside the sloops HMS Kite and HMS Ranger in the Firth of Forth in March 1798.

Captain Henry Inman assumed command of Andromeda in March 1799, again on the Downs Station and based at Sheerness. On 4 May 1800 Andromeda was firing a salute in Margate Roads when some powder was accidentally set alight and subsequently blew up, blinding fourteen members of the crew. Still on the Downs Station, she participated in the Raid on Dunkirk on 7 July where the British attacked four French frigates with a fleet of fire ships and small boats, capturing one of them, Désirée.

Inman was sent to command the captured French frigate and he was replaced in December by Captain James Bradby who sailed Andromeda again to the Leeward Islands, leaving on 1 December with the Governor of the Leeward Islands Lord Lavington on board. In June 1801 Captain Edward Durnford King took command of the frigate, transferring from the ship of the line HMS Leviathan. King commanded Andromeda on station until November when he was forced to return to England due to an illness, being replaced on 15 January 1802 by Captain Charles Feilding. The Peace of Amiens now being in effect, Feilding sailed Andromeda home from Martinique on 21 August, reaching Portsmouth on 24 September. Here she was laid up.

== Fate ==
Andromeda spent the rest of her service out of commission at Portsmouth. She was finally broken up in September 1811.
