= French frigate Désirée =

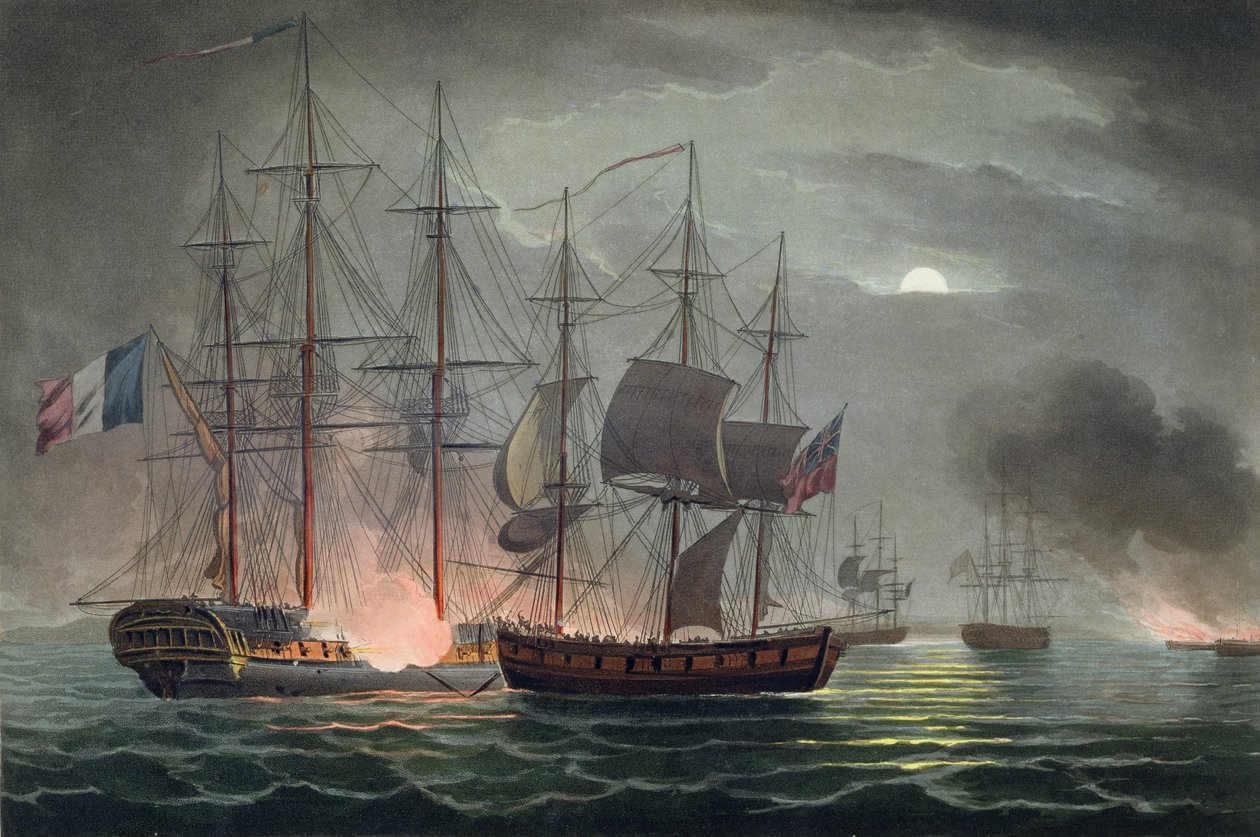
- Capture of Désirée by HMS Dart

History

France
- Name: Désirée
- Ordered: 19 March 1794
- Builder: Dunkirk
- Laid down: 10 February 1794
- Launched: 23 April 1796

Great Britain
- Name: HMS Desiree
- Acquired: 8 July 1800 by capture
- Fate: Sold 22 August 1832

General characteristics
- Class & type: Romaine-class frigate
- Displacement: 700 tonnes
- Tons burthen: 1,01650/94 (bm)
- Length: 45.5 m (149 ft 3 in)
- Beam: 11.8 m (38 ft 9 in)
- Draught: 5 m (16 ft 5 in)
- Propulsion: Sail
- Complement: French:340; British: 264
- Armament: French; Original: 24 × 24-pounder guns (upper deck) + 16 × 8-pounder guns (spar deck); Later: 24 × 18-pounder guns + 12 × 8-pounder guns + 4 × 36-pounder obusier de vaisseau; British; Upper deck: 26 × 18-pounder guns; QD: 2 × 9-pounder guns + 8 × 32-pounder carronades; Fc: 2 × 9-pounder guns + 2 × 32-pounder carronades
- Armour: Timber

Désirée was a Romaine-class frigate of the French Navy, launched at Dunkirk in 1794. The British Royal Navy captured her in 1800 and took her into service under her existing name. She was laid up in 1815, and in 1823 converted to a slop ship (a vessel for the storage and distribution of sailor's clothing). She was sold in 1832.

== Capture ==
HMS Dart, under Patrick Campbell, captured Désirée on 8 July 1800 in the Raid on Dunkirk. Many British vessels shared in the proceeds of the capture.

== British career ==
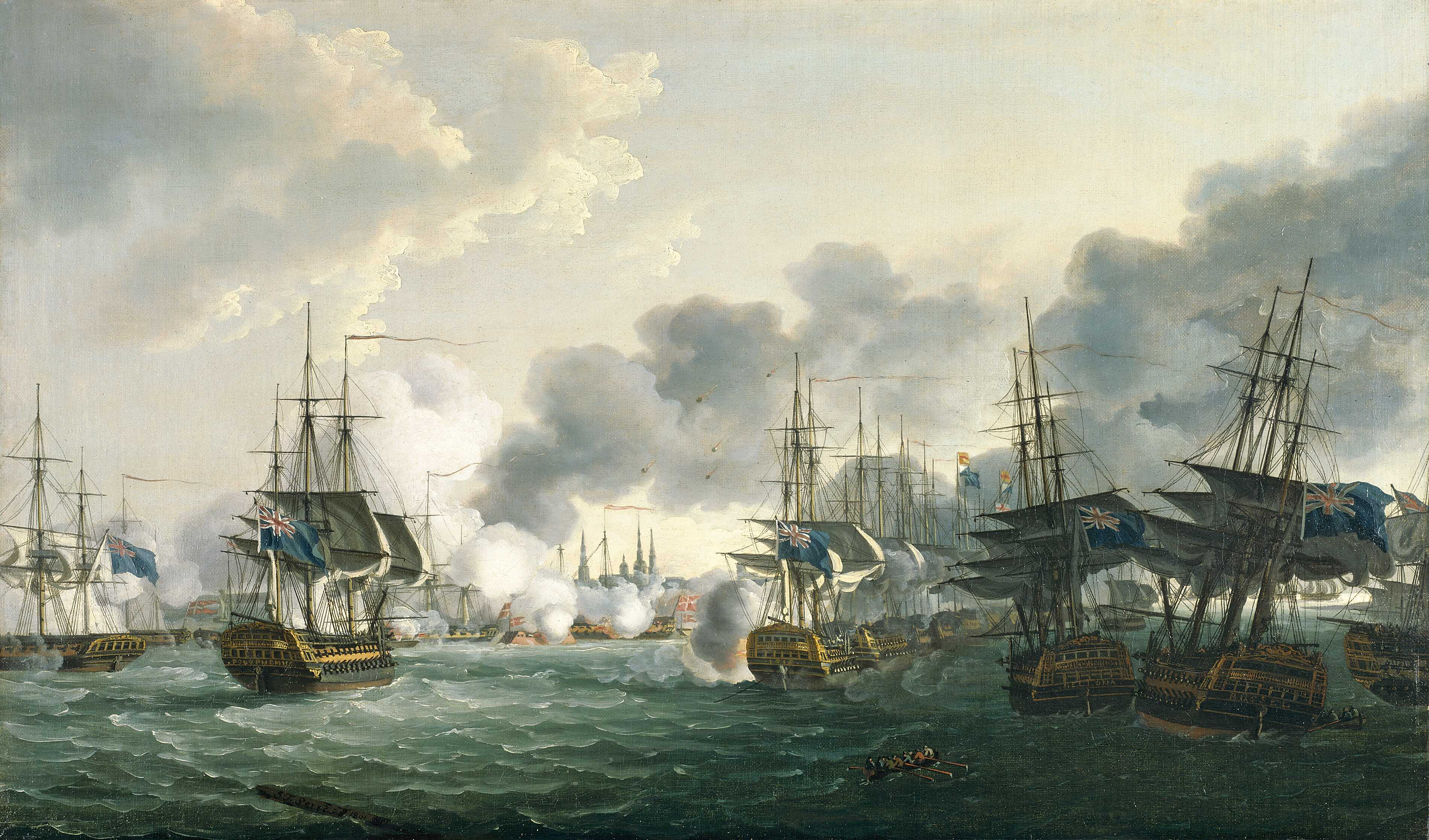
Desiree at Copenhagen, 1801

Desiree shared with Britomart in the proceeds of the capture on 5 January 1810 of Lynboom, Myden, master.

On 7 May 1813, she was under the command of Captain Arthur Farquarh when she captured the American schooner Decatur. (Note: A first-class share of the prize money was worth £187 11s 3½d; a sixth-class share, that of an ordinary seaman, was worth £1 12s 5¼d.)

On 17 July 1813 she captured the French privateer Esperance. (Note: A first-class share of the head money paid in October 1832 was worth £12 3s 6½d; a sixth-class share was worth 1s 1½d.)

== Fate ==
Desiree was laid up at Sheerness in August 1815. Between January and November 1823 she was fitted as a slop ship. She was sold for £2,020 on 22 August 1832 to Joseph Christie at Rotherhithe.
