= List of ship launches in 1797 =

The list of ship launches in 1797 includes a chronological list of some ships launched in 1797.

Date	Ship	Class	Builder	Location	Country	Notes
12 January	Earl Talbot	East Indiaman	Perry	Blackwall	Great Britain	For British East India Company.
28 January	Ceres	East Indiaman	Perry	Blackwall	Great Britain	For British East India Company.
28 January	Eendracht	Fifth rate		Rotterdam	Batavian Republic	For Batavian Navy.
28 January	Neptune	Neptune-class ship of the line	Deptford Dockyard	Deptford	Great Britain	For Royal Navy.
28 January	Oldenbarneveldt	Third rate		Rotterdam	Batavian Republic	For Dutch East India Company.
29 January	Pigot	East Indiaman	Randall & Brent	Rotherhithe	Great Britain	Purchased by Royal Navy.
7 February	Crash	Acute-class gunbrig	Mrs Frances Barnard & Co.	Deptford	Great Britain	For Royal Navy.
13 February	Cambrian	Fifth rate	George Parsons	Bursledon	Great Britain	For Royal Navy.
13 February	Coutts	East Indiaman	Randall	Rotherhithe	Great Britain	For British East India Company.
13 February	Ganges	East Indiaman	John Wells	Deptford	Great Britain	For British East India Company.
22 February	Selimiye	First rate	Jacques Balthazar Brun de Sainte Catherine	Constantinople	Ottoman Empire	For Ottoman Navy.
27 February	Naiad	Amazon-class frigate	Hall & Co.	Limehouse	Great Britain	For Royal Navy.
11 March	Victor	Snake-class sloop	Josiah & Thomas Brindley	King's Lynn	Great Britain	For Royal Navy.
13 March	GB No. 10	Acute-class gunbrig	Richard Wells	Rotherhithe	Great Britain	For Royal Navy.
13 March	Hope	Merchantman	Thomas Pitcher	Northfleet	Great Britain	For Alexander Hume.
13 March	Hydra	Fifth rate	William Cleverley	Gravesend	Great Britain	For Royal Navy.
14 March	Acasta	Acasta-class frigate	John Randall & Co.	Rotherhithe	Great Britain	For Royal Navy
14 March	Centaur	Mars-class ship of the line	Woolwich Dockyard	Woolwich	Great Britain	For Royal Navy.
14 March	Ethalion	Artois-class frigate	Joseph Graham	Harwich	Great Britain	For Royal Navy.
14 March	Eurydice	Merchantman	John Troughton	Chester	Great Britain	For John St Barbe.
29 March	Endymion	Endymion-class frigate	John Randall & Co.	Rotherhithe	Great Britain	For Royal Navy.
29 March	GB No. 22	Courser-class gunbrig	John Perry	Blackwall	Great Britain	For Royal Navy.
31 March	GB No. 23	Courser-class gunbrig	John Perry	Blackwall	Great Britain	For Royal Navy.
1 April	GB No. 24	Courser-class gunbrig	John Perry	Blackwall	Great Britain	For Royal Navy.
4 April	Northumberland	Merchantman	Temple shipbuilders	South Shields	Great Britain	For J. Lyall.
5 April	Crash	Acute-class gunbrig	Mrs. Frances Barnard & Co.	Deptford	Great Britain	For Royal Navy.
10 April	Asp	Acute-class gunbrig	John Randall	Rotherhithe	Great Britain	For Royal Navy.
10 April	Furnace	Courser-class gunbrig	Perry & Co.	Blackwall	Great Britain	For Royal Navy.
10 April	GB No. 4	Acute-class gunbrig	John Randall	Rotherhithe	Great Britain	For Royal Navy.
10 April	Griper	Courser-class gunbrig	Thomas Pitcher	Northfleet	Great Britain	For Royal Navy.
10 April	Growler	Courser-class gunbrig	Thomas Pitcher	Northfleet	Great Britain	For Royal Navy.
11 April	GB No. 9	Acute-class gunbrig	Richard Wells	Rotherhithe	Great Britain	For Royal Navy.
11 April	GB No. 11	Acute-class gunbrig	Richard Wells	Rotherhithe	Great Britain	For Royal Navy.
11 April	GB No. 16	Acute-class gunbrig	Frances Barnard	Deptford	Great Britain	For Royal Navy.
12 April	Admiral Gardner	East Indiaman	Melhuish	Limehouse	Great Britain	For British East India Company.
12 April	Boadicea	Frigate	Balthazar Adams	Bucklers Hard	Great Britain	For Royal Navy.
12 April	Sirius	Fifth rate	John Dudman	Deptford	Great Britain	For Royal Navy.
14 April	Blazer	Acute-class gunbrig	John Dudman & Co.	Deptford	Great Britain	For Royal Navy.
15 April	GB No. 30	Courser-class gunbrig	William Cleverley	Gravesend	Great Britain	For Royal Navy.
22 April	GB No. 17	Acute-class gunbrig	Frances Barnard	Deptford	Great Britain	For Royal Navy.
24 April	GB No. 18	Acute-class gunbrig	Frances Barnard	Deptford	Great Britain	For Royal Navy.
24 April	GB No. 19	Courser-class gunbrig	Hill & Mellish	Limehouse	Great Britain	For Royal Navy.
25 April	GB No. 20	Courser-class gunbrig	Robert Hill	Limehouse	Great Britain	For Royal Navy.
25 April	Cracker	Acute-class gunbrig	John Dudman & Co.	Deptford	Great Britain	For Royal Navy.
28 April	Clinker	Acute-class gunbrig		Sunderland	Great Britain	For Royal Navy. Subcontracted from John Dudman, Deptford.
April	Acute	Acute-class gunbrig	John Randall	Rotherhithe	Great Britain	For Royal Navy.
April	GB No. 7	Acute-class gunbrig	John Randall	Deptford	Great Britain	For Royal Navy.
April	GB No. 8	Acute-class gunbrig	Richard Wells	Rotherhithe	Great Britain	For Royal Navy.
April	GB No. 28	Courser-class gunbrig	Thomas Pitcher	Northfleet	Great Britain	For Royal Navy.
April	GB No. 29	Courser-class gunbrig	Thomas Pitcher	Northfleet	Great Britain	For Royal Navy.
April	GB No. 31	Courser-class gunbrig	William Cleverley	Gravesend	Great Britain	For Royal Navy.
1 May	GB No. 44	Gunvessel	John Nicholson	Rochester	Great Britain	For Royal Navy.
2 May	GB No. 32	Courser-class gunbrig	John Wilson & Co.	Frindsbury	Great Britain	For Royal Navy.
2 May	Severnyi Oryol	Iaroslav-class ship of the line	G. Ignatyev	Arkhangelsk	Russia	For Imperial Russian Navy.
10 May	United States	Heavy frigate	Joshua Humphreys	Philadelphia	United States	For United States Navy
21 May	Defender	Courser-class gunbrig	Hill & Mellish	Limehouse	Great Britain	For Royal Navy
26 May	Pobeda	Aziia-class ship of the line	G. Ignatyev	Arkhangelsk	Russia	For French Navy.
25 June	Franklin	Third rate	Jean-Jacques Aubazir	Toulon	France	For French Navy.
27 June	Créole	Frigate	Antoine & Louis Crucy	Nantes	France	For French Navy.
29 June	Crescent	Fifth rate		Portsmouth, New Hampshire	United States	For Algerian Navy.
June	GB No. 33	Courser-class gunbrig	John Wilson & Co	Frindsbury	Great Britain	For Royal Navy.
June	L'Oiseau	Privateer			France	For private owner.
19 July	Simion i Anna	Sviatoi Pyotr-class ship of the line	A. S. Katsanov	Kherson	Russia	For Imperial Russian Navy.
22 August	Muiron	Frigate		Venice	Republic of Venice	For French Navy
7 September	Constellation	Frigate	David Stodder	Baltimore	United States	For United States Navy
11 September	Tigress	Courser-class gunbrig	Thomas Pitcher	Northfleet	Great Britain	For Royal Navy.
22 September	Furieuse	Seine-class frigate		Cherbourg	France	For French Navy.
September	Echo	Echo-class brig	Thomas King	Dover	Great Britain	For Royal Navy.
5 October	Hercule	Téméraire-class ship of the line		Lorient	France	For French Navy.
7 October	Osprey	Sloop-of-war	Thomas Pitcher	Northfleet	Great Britain	For Royal Navy.
17 October	Franchise	Coquille-class frigate		Bayonne	France	For French Navy.
21 October	Constitution	United States-class frigate	Edmund Hartt	Boston	United States	For United States Navy
30 November	Amphitrite	Fifth rate		Amsterdam	Batavian Republic	For Batavian Navy.
3 November	Buffalo	Storeship	John Dudman	Deptford	Great Britain	For Royal Navy.
9 November	Medea	Fifth rate	Julian Martin de Retamosa	Ferrol	Spain	For Spanish Navy.
20 November	Busy	Brig-sloop	Joseph Graham	Harwich	Great Britain	For Royal Navy.
24 November	Spartiate	Téméraire-class ship of the line		Toulon	France	For French Navy.
November	Confiance	Corvette		Bordeaux	France	For French Navy.
18 December	Snake	Snake-class brig-sloop	Balthazar & Edward Adams	Bucklers Hard	Great Britain	For Royal Navy.
20 December	Cruizer	Cruizer-class brig-sloop	Stephen Teague	Ipswich	Great Britain	For Royal Navy
December	Dédaigneuse	Coquille-class frigate	Jean Baudry	Bayonne	France	For French Navy.
Unknown date	Active	Brigantine	Nicholas Bools & William Good	Bridport	Great Britain	For Arthur Wishart and others.
Unknown date	Albion	Merchantman		Sunderland	Great Britain	For W. Robson.
Unknown date	Alfred	Brig	John & Philip Laing	Sunderland	Great Britain	For Matthew Robson.
Unknown date	Asia	Full-rigged ship		Bombay Dockyard	India	For British East India Company.
Unknown date	Auspicious	East Indiaman	W. J. Bottomley	King's Lynn	Great Britain	For S. Baker.
Unknown date	Badi-i Nusret	Second rate	Jacques Balthazar Brun de Sainte Catherine	Constantinople	Ottoman Empire	For Ottoman Navy.
Unknown date	Bellone	Sixth rate		Bordeaux	France	For French Navy.
Unknown date	Beşaretnüma	Third rate	Jacques Balthazar Brun de Sainte Catherine	Constantinople	Ottoman Empire	For Ottoman Navy.
Unknown date	Bhavani	Full-rigged ship		Calcutta	India	For private owner.
Unknown date	Brave	Privateer		Nantes	France	For Benoit Boucard and others.
Unknown date	Caledonian	Full-rigged ship	Frances Barnard	River Thames	Great Britain	For Robert Charnock.
Unknown date	Cambridge	Merchantman		Whitby	Great Britain	For private owner.
Unknown date	Cengaver	Sixth rate	Jacques Balthazar Brun de Sainte Catherine	Constantinople	Ottoman Empire	For Ottoman Navy.
Unknown date	Commerce	Brig		Teignmouth	Great Britain	For private owner.
Unknown date	Cornélie	Virginie-class frigate			France	For French Navy.
Unknown date	Dane	Merchantman	John & Philip Laing	Sunderland	Great Britain	For private owner.
Unknown date	Dasher	Dasher-class sloop	John Outerbridge	Bermuda	(Kingdom of Great Britain)	For Royal Navy.
Unknown date	Driver	Dasher-class sloop	Nathaniel Tynes	Bermuda	(Kingdom of Great Britain) Bermuda	For Royal Navy.
Unknown date	Hannah	Merchantman		Liverpool	Great Britain	For private owner.
Unknown date	Harbinger	Brig		Quebec City	(Kingdom of Great Britain) Lower Canada	For Michel Hogan.
Unknown date	Hassan Bashaw	Sixth rate		Philadelphia, Pennsylvania	United States	For Algerian Navy.
Unknown date	Hediyyetü'l Müluk	Fifth rate	Mustafa Molla	Sinop	Ottoman Empire	For Ottoman Navy.
Unknown date	Herald	Merchantman		Newburyport, Massachusetts	United States	For private owner.
Unknown date	Hermes	Merchantman	Thomas Hearn	North Shields	Great Britain	For private owner.
Unknown date	Hippomenes	Corvette		Vlissingen	Batavian Republic	For Batavian Navy.
Unknown date	Jane	Whaler		Aberdeen	Great Britain	For private owner.
Unknown date	Juno	Merchantman		Lancaster	Great Britain	For Mr. Hausman.
Unknown date	Kongen af Assianthe	Slave ship		Umeå	Sweden	For Jeppe Prætorius & Co.
Unknown date	Le Buonaparte	Privateer		São Salvador da Bahia de Todos os Santos	(Portugal) Brazil	For private owner.
Unknown date	La Caroline	Privateer			France	For private owner.
Unknown date	Laharpe	Third rate		Venice	Republic of Venice	Under construction for French Navy, seized by the Habsburg monarchy in November on the formation of the Venetian Province. Entered service with the Austrian Navy in 1799.
Unknown date	Beyrand	Third rate		Venice	Republic of Venice	Under construction for French Navy, seized by the Habsburg monarchy in November on the formation of the Venetian Province. Entered service with the Austrian Navy in 1799.
Unknown date	Stengel	Third rate		Venice	Republic of Venice	Under construction for French Navy, seized by the Habsburg monarchy in November on the formation of the Venetian Province. Entered service with the Austrian Navy in 1799.
Unknown date	Lelah Eisha	Schooner		Philadelphia, Pennsylvania	United States	For Algerian Navy.
Unknown date	Le President Parker	Privateer			France	For private owner.
Unknown date	Lively	Sloop	Nicholas Bools & William Good	Bridport	Great Britain	For John Bagwell, Nicholas Bools, William Good and Thomas Swain.
Unknown date	Malta	Schooner			United States	For Spanish Navy.
Unknown date	Mildred	Merchantman		Hull	Great Britain	For Moxon & Co.
Unknown date	Millbrook	Schooner	Hobbs & Hellyer	Redbridge	Great Britain	For Royal Navy.
Unknown date	Neptune	Merchantman	Patrick Beatson	Quebec City	(Kingdom of Great Britain) Lower Canada	For Mr. Davidson.
Unknown date	Nowa	Merchantman		Sunderland	Great Britain	Forprivate owner.
Unknown date	Olive Branch	West Indiaman		Broadstairs	Great Britain	For T. Brown.
Unknown date	Otter	West Indiaman		Liverpool	Great Britain	For Mr. Molyneux.
Unknown date	Parr	Slave ship	John Wright	Liverpool	Great Britain	For Thomas Parr.
Unknown date	Pérola	Fifth rate		Pará	(Portugal) Brazil	For Portuguese Navy.
Unknown date	Princesa Real	Sixth rate		Pará	(Portugal)	For Portuguese Navy.
Unknown date	Renard	Privateer			France	For private owner.
Unknown date	Roselle	West Indiaman		Hull	Great Britain	For Sibbald & Co.
Unknown date	Rutland	Cutter	Nicholas Bools & William Good	Bridport	Great Britain	For N. Awigly.
Unknown date	Şahin-i Derya	Fourth rate	Dimitri Kalfa	Ereğli	Ottoman Empire	For Ottoman Navy.
Unknown date	Sao Joao Magnânimo	Sixth rate		Pará	(Portugal) Brazil	For Portuguese Navy.
Unknown date	Sarah	Merchantman		Liverpool	Great Britain	For private owner.
Unknown date	Sayyad-i Bahri	Third rate	Venetian Josef Kalfa	Dardanelles	Ottoman Empire	For Ottoman Navy.
Unknown date	Scipio	Corvette		Rotterdam	Batavian Republic	For Batavian Navy.
Unknown date	Skjoldebrand	Sixth rate		Philadelphia, Pennsylvania	United States	For Algerian Navy.
Unknown date	Speculator	Merchantman		River Thames	Great Britain	For private owner.
Unknown date	Speedwell	Cutter		Cowes	Great Britain	For Board of Customs.
Unknown date	St. Mary's	Galley		St. Marys, Georgia	United States	For United States Navy.
Unknown date	Şuca-ı Bahri	Sixth rate	Jacques Balthazar Brun de Sainte Catherine	Constantinople	Ottoman Empire	For Ottoman Navy.
Unknown date	Tiz Hareket	Fifth rate	Antuvan Kalfa	Rhodes	(Ottoman Empire) Ottoman Greece	For Ottoman Navy.
Unknown date	Vautour	Privateer	Bourmaud Frères	Nantes	France	For private owner.
Unknown date	Vigilant	Cutter			United States	For Revenue-Marine.
Unknown date	Virginia	Cutter			United States	For Revenue-Marine.
Unknown date	Wanton	Schooner			(Kingdom of Great Britain) Province of Quebec	For private owner.
Unknown date	Whydah	West Indiaman		Whitby	Great Britain	For Mr. Fletcher.
Unknown date	Will	Slave ship		Liverpool	Great Britain	For Aspinall & Co.
Unknown date	Name unknown	Merchantman		France or Spain	Unknown	For private owner.
Unknown date	Name unknown	Merchantman			Batavian Republic	For private owner.
Unknown date	Name unknown	Merchantman			Spain	For private owner.
Unknown date	Name unknown	Merchantman		Plymouth, Massachusetts	United States	For private owner.
Unknown date	Name unknown	Merchantman		South America	Unknown	For private owner.
Unknown date	Name unknown	Merchantman			France	For private owner.
Unknown date	Name unknown	Merchantman			United States	For private owner.
Unknown date	Name unknown	Full-rigged ship		Stettin or Sweden	Unknown	For private owner.
Unknown date	Name unknown	Merchantman			(Portugal) Brazil	For private owner.
