= HMS Oroonoko =

Two vessels of the Royal Navy have borne the name HMS Oroonoko, after Oroonoko, or possibly the Orinoco:

- HMS Oroonoko was the Courser-class gun-brig HMS Steady (ex GB-19), launched in 1797, that was renamed Oroonoko in 1805 when she was converted to a temporary prison ship at Trinidad. She was sold in 1806 at Barbados.
- HMS Oroonoko (1805) was the French privateer Eugène, which the Royal Navy bought in 1805 to replace the previous Oroonoko at Port-of-Spain, Trinidad. She was sold in 1814.

== See also ==
- HMS Oronoque

This article includes data released under a Creative Commons Attribution-ShareAlike 3.0 Unported UK: England & Wales Licence, by the National Maritime Museum, as part of the Warship Histories project.
