= HMS Growler =

Several ships of the Royal Navy have borne the name HMS Growler

- HMS Growler (1797), a Courser-class gun-brig launched in 1797 and captured by French privateers on 21 December 1797. The French Navy took her into service under her existing name. The Royal Navy recovered her in a decayed state in 1809.
- Growler was a tender to HMS Vanguard in September 1803.
- HMS Growler (1804), a gun-brig launched in 1804 and sold in 1815
- HMS Growler was the USS Growler, a schooner of five guns that served in the War of 1812, changing hands three times, finally becoming HMS Hamilton.
- HMS Growler (1841), a sloop, broken up January 1854 at Portsmouth.
- HMS Growler (1856), an Albacore-class screw gunboat. broken up 14 December 1864 at Malta.
- HMS Growler (1868), a Beacon-class gunvessel, launched in 1868 and sold for scrap in 1887.
- HMS Growler (1942), a rescue tug. Later RFA Growler

== See also ==
- RFA Growler - two ships of the Royal Fleet Auxiliary
