= Whydah =

Whydah may refer in English to:

- Whydah, one of a number of species of birds in the family Viduidae, also called indigobirds
- Whydah Gally, a ship captained by pirate Samuel Bellamy that was wrecked in 1717 and was discovered in 1984
- Whydah (1797 ship)
- The Whydah, 2017 nonfiction children's book
- Ouidah, city and colonial fort in present Benin
- Kingdom of Whydah, which included Ouidah but was headquartered in Savi
