= HMS Russell (1764) =

1764 Navy ship

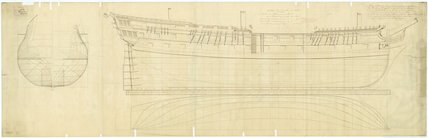
- Russell

History

Great Britain
- Name: HMS Russell
- Ordered: 8 January 1761
- Builder: West, Deptford
- Launched: 10 November 1764
- Honours and awards: Participated in: Battle of the Saintes; Glorious First of June; Battle of Groix; Battle of Camperdown; Battle of Copenhagen (1801)
- Fate: Sold out of the service, 1811
- Notes: Harbour service from 1812

General characteristics
- Class & type: Ramillies-class ship of the line
- Tons burthen: 1642 bm
- Length: 168 ft 6 in (51.36 m) (gundeck)
- Beam: 46 ft 11 in (14.30 m)
- Depth of hold: 19 ft 9 in (6.02 m)
- Propulsion: Sails
- Sail plan: Full-rigged ship
- Armament: Gundeck: 28 × 32-pounder guns; Upper gundeck: 28 × 18-pounder guns; QD: 14 × 9-pounder guns; Fc: 4 × 9-pounder guns

HMS Russell was a 74-gun third rate ship of the line of the Royal Navy, launched on 10 November 1764 at Deptford.

== Career ==
May, 1778 under command of Capt. Frances Samuel Drake.

In 1782, she was commanded by Captain James Saumarez at the Battle of the Saintes. In 1794 she was part of Admiral Howe's fleet at the Glorious First of June, and in the following year Russell fought in the Battle of Groix. She also fought at the Battle of Camperdown in 1797.

Russell was at Plymouth on 20 January 1795 and so shared in the proceeds of the detention of the Dutch naval vessels, East Indiamen, and other merchant vessels that were in port on the outbreak of war between Britain and the Netherlands.

In 1797 Russell was commanded by Captain Henry Trollope, who led her at the Battle of Camperdown.

On 24 February 1801, Lloyd's List reported that Russell had towed "Duckingfield Hall", Pedder, master, into Torbay. She had been sailing from Antigua to London when of the Scilly Islands another vessel had run foul of her. Duckenfield Hall had lost her foremast, and her fore, main, and mizzen topmasts; the vessel that ran into her was believed to have foundered.

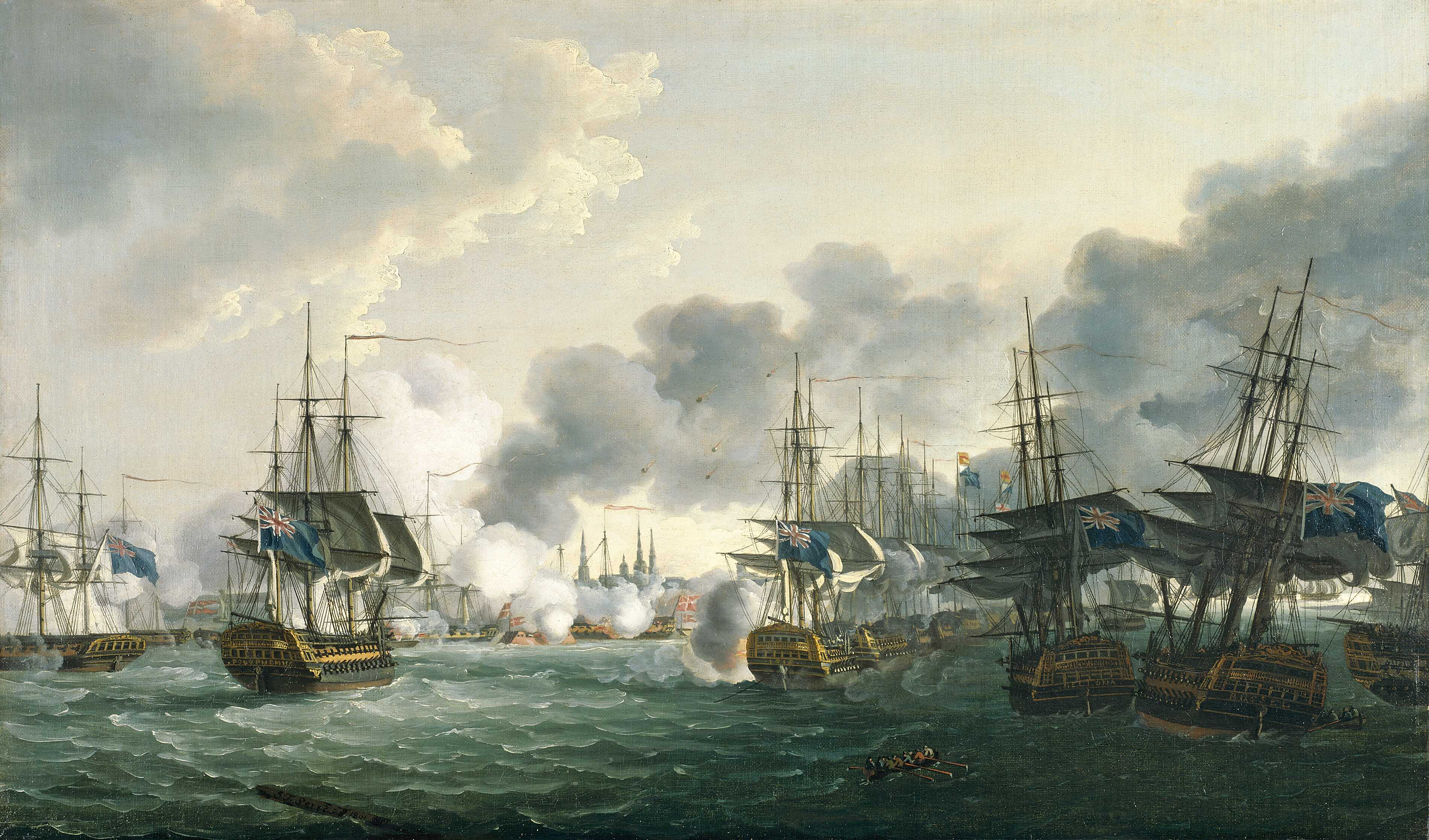
Russell at Copenhagen, 1801

In March, Russell was under the command of William Cuming, part of the Baltic fleet sent to break up the League of Armed Neutrality. The fleet assembled in the Kattegat in March 1801 but on 22 March a storm came up that dispersed some of the vessels. Both the gun-brigs Blazer and Tickler were driven under the guns of Varberg Fortress. The Swedes captured Blazer, but Russell towed Tickler to safety.

Russell and was at the Battle of Copenhagen on 2 April. Despite going aground early on in the battle, Russell was able to engage the Danish ship Prøvesteenen, and when she surrendered, send boats to take possession of her. In 1847 the Navy awarded the Naval General Service Medal (1847) with clasp "Copenhagen 1801" to all the surviving claimants from the battle.

Lloyd's List (LL) reported on 10 June 1803 that Russell had burnt a 14-gun French navy brig coming from San Domingo.

On 16 October 1803 she was three days out of Rio and in company with the fourth rate HMS Grampus. They were escorting the East Indiamen Northampton, Lord Melville, Earl Spencer, Princess Mary, Anna, Ann, Glory, and Essex, all bound to Bengal. Also, Grampus carried £100,000 for the British East India Company.

On 12 February 1808 Russell arrived off the Danish possession of Tranquebar where she landed troops of the 14th Regiment of Foot and the Honourable East India Company's artillery. Tranquebar capitulated without resistance. (Note: In February 1824 prize money was paid to the troops, artillerymen, and the crews of Russell and Monmouth, which had appeared on the scene. A first-class share for Russell was worth £254 18s 9d; a fifth-class share, that of a seaman, was worth 19s 11d.)

== Fate ==
Russell was sold out of the service in 1811.
