= HMS Tickler (1794) =

Gunvessel of the Royal Navy (1794–1802)

History

Great Britain
- Name: HMS Tickler
- Ordered: 6 March 1794
- Builder: Hill & Mellish, Limehouse
- Laid down: March 1794
- Launched: 15 April 1795, Deptford
- Fate: Sold January 1802

General characteristics
- Class & type: Conquest-class gunbrig
- Tons burthen: 14750/94 (bm)
- Length: Overall: 75 ft 2 in (22.9 m); Keel: 62 ft 6 1/4 in (19.1 m)
- Beam: 21 ft 0 3/4 in (6.4 m)
- Depth of hold: 7 ft 0 in (2.1 m)
- Complement: 50
- Armament: 10 × 18-pounder carronades + 2 × 24-pounder bow chasers + 2 × 4-pounder stern chase guns

HMS Tickler was launched in 1794 as a Conquest-class gunbrig. She was sold in 1802.

== Career ==
Lieutenant James Gomm commissioned Teazer in February 1795. She then joined Sir Sidney Smith's squadron. In July Lieutenant Gomm, Lieutenant Titus Allardyce of Shark and Lieutenant Henry Hicks of Hawke faced mutinous conduct by seamen at the Îles Saint-Marcouf. This escalated into a situation that involved counter-charges and the confinement of Hicks, Allardyce, and Gomm. Smith was dissatisfied with the officers' conduct but would later write that he had treated the officers with great leniency. (Note: In 1795 Shark's crew mutinied and handed their gunboat over to the French.)

Lieutenant John Johnson recommissioned Tickler in August 1797.

Lieutenant Thomas Williams commanded Tickler from August 1797.

Between March and June 1798 Tickler was at Portsmouth undergoing coppering and conversion to a brig.

On 7 August 1799 Carolina capsized in the English Channel off Poole, Dorset. Tickler, under the command of Lieutenant Williams, rescued her crew. Carolina was on a voyage from Ystad, Sweden to Dublin. She was later taken in to Portsmouth.

Tickler sailed with the fleet that would attack Copenhagen in 1801. However, she does not appear in the listing of vessels whose crews qualified for the clasp "Copenhagen 1801) to the Naval General Service Medal (1847). The fleet assembled in the Kattegat in March 1801 but on 22 March a storm came up that dispersed some of the vessels. The gun-brig Blazer was driven under the guns of Varberg Fortress where the Swedes captured her; they restored her to the British in May 1801. Russell had towed Tickler on 13 March and the weather caused Russell to ground; she was gotten off by the exertions of her crew.

== Fate ==
The "Principal Officers and Commissioners and of His Majesty's Navy" offered "Tickler, Gun-Vessel, 150 Tons, Copper-bottomed, lying at Portsmouth", for sale on 12 May 1802. She sold there on that day.
