= HMS Moucheron =

Sloop of the Royal Navy

History

France
- Name: Moucheron
- Namesake: Gnat
- Launched: 1799
- Captured: 1801

United Kingdom
- Name: HMS Moucheron
- Namesake: Previous name retained
- Commissioned: 1803
- Fate: Foundered 1807

General characteristics
- Type: sloop
- Tons burthen: French:250 (French; "of load"); Royal Navy:28624/94 (bm)
- Length: 93 ft 0 in (28.35 m) (overall); 76 ft 1 7/8 in (23.212 m) (keel)
- Beam: 26 ft 7 in (8.10 m)
- Depth of hold: 12 ft 0 in (3.66 m)
- Complement: French service: 130 men; British service: 96 men (later 90)
- Armament: French service: 16 × 6- & 12-pounder guns; British service: 14 × 18-pounder carronades + 2 × 6-pounder bow chasers

HMS Moucheron was a French privateer, built in 1799, that the British captured in 1801. The British government purchased her in 1802 for the Royal Navy. She foundered in 1807 in the Mediterranean without leaving a trace.

== Privateer ==
Prior to circa May 1799 Moucheron was named Actif, but she was not the former French naval brig Actif, built in Bordeaux. (Note: Roche reports that the French naval brig Actif became HMS Morgiana. However, Morgiana was a former French privateer that Thames captured in 1800.)

Moucheron was commissioned at Bordeaux in May 1799. She made her first cruise between May 1799 and some time in 1800. She was armed with 18 guns and had a crew of 130 men under Captain Jean Lugeol.

On 18 July 1800, Moucheron and another privateer, Abeille, captured the American ship Josephus and brought her into Cadiz. There the French Consul released the vessel and her cargo. The privateers appealed to the prize court in Paris, which upheld the release. (Note: Abeille was a French privateer commissioned in Cadiz in May 1800. She cruised under Captain J. Adrien, who came from Martigues, from May 1800 to January 1801.)

At some point Moucheron captured the American ship Argo, Thomas Chipman, master, and brought her into port. The Council of Prizes at Paris ordered Argo's release on 3 September.

For her second cruise, Moucheron, of 16 guns and 120 men, was under the command of Captain Pruvost. She started her cruise in January 1801.

== Capture ==
On 16 February 1801, Révolutionnaire captured Moucheron. Moucheron was armed with sixteen 6 and 12-pounder guns, and had a crew of 130 men. She was 20 days out of Passages and had captured the British brig William, of London, which had been sailing from St. Michael's with a cargo of fruit.

== British service ==
Moucheron arrived in Plymouth on 7 March 1801. The Government purchased her in 1802 and she was fitting out at Plymouth in June 1803, when Commander James Hawes commissioned her. He had been promoted in 1802 and was given the best sloop available at the time.

On 15 November 1803, Moucheron was in company with Poulette and Liberty off Alderney when Poulette came across a French convoy of some 30 transports plus armed escorts. Poulette was able to run the vessels ashore and her boats captured three, a brig, a lugger and a sloop. Unfortunately, Moucheron was unable to come up in time though Liberty did. The British suffered no casualties.

On 22 January 1804 Dorchester came into Plymouth. A French lugger privateer had captured her, but Moucheron had recaptured her. Dorchester, Mobery, master, had been sailing from Bristol to Falmouth. The lugger had also captured five other vessels.

On 2 March 1804 the French privateer lugger Sorcier captured two merchantmen, Rising Sun and William and Mary in the Bristol Channel. Rising Sun, Batchelor, mastre, had been sailing from Youghall to Poole, and William and Mary, Skean, master, had been sailing from Padstow to Bridport, Moucheron recaptured them on 5 March and sent them into Guernsey on 8 March. (Note: Sorcière was a 45-ton privateer lugger disguised as a fishing boat, commissioned in September 1802 in Saint-Malo. For her first cruise, from September to November 1803, she carried ten 4-pounder guns and a crew of 42 men under Captain Jacques Laurent. Her second cruise took place from November 1803 to November 1804. She still carried ten 4-pounder guns and had a crew of about 40 men under Captain Pierre Dupont. Her last cruise began in November 1804 under Jacques Debon. She was armed with ten 4-pounder guns and four swivel guns. Her crew numbered 44 to 60 men. HMS Rebuff captured her on 26 April 1806.)

On 3 February 1805 Moucheron recaptured the ship Cambridge, Lewes, master, and her cargo. The French privateer Braave, of 18 guns and 160 men, had captured Cambridge while she was on her way from Jamaica to Liverpool. After her recapture by Moucheron, Cambridge reached Cork on 14 February. At around the same time Moucheron recaptured the brig Speedwell and her cargo.

On 8 February Moucheron was under the command of a Captain Reed when she sailed with sealed orders that had arrived by special King's Messenger. They were of such importance that the Admiral sent the messenger on board with them, and she sailed directly.

In April 1805 Moucheron was in the Mediterranean. Lord Nelson had her patrol the Straits of Gibraltar and provide the garrison of Gibraltar such assistance as they might require.

On 3 August 1805, Calcutta, left St Helena as escort of a motley convoy to England. On 26 September 1805 the convoy was in the Channel south of the Isles of Scilly when it encountered a French squadron. It turned out this was Allemand's squadron. Calcutta was forced to strike, but not before she had bought time for the convoy to escape. Moucheron was in the vicinity and sailed to the sound of the guns. She then proceeded to cruise with Allemand’s squadron, which paid her no attention as she was flying an American flag. Moucheron counted the French ships and then, having completed her reconnaissance, sailed to notify Admiral Lord Cornwallis at Brest. However, by the time Cornwallis arrived at the spot where Moucheron had left Allemand, he had left.

On 7 and 9 April 1806 Moucheron, by this time, and perhaps earlier, again under Hawse's command, captured the Prussian galliot Jonge Cornelius and the ship Mercurius, which carrying eight cases of coffee. In between, on 8 April, she shared with the gun-brigs Hardy and Daring in the capture of Minerva.

On 15 and 16 April Goede Zaak, Bomman, master, from Morlaix, and Ora & Labora from Amsterdam, came into Plymouth, prizes to Moucheron.

In May Moucheron detained and sent into Plymouth Ariadne, of Hamburg, Parmas, master. She was sailing from Bordeaux.

Between 18 and 21 June, Admiral Sir John Borlase Warren and a squadron were off Madeira. Moucheron, Whiting, and the hired armed cutter John Bull arrived at Madeira on 18 June and they sailed from Madeira to join the squadron on 21 June.

== Fate ==
Moucheron disappeared in the eastern Mediterranean in early 1807, with some accounts specifying the Dardanelles. As no trace of her or her crew was ever found, this is pure conjecture. The Royal Navy officially paid her off effective 7 June 1807.

== See also ==
- List of people who disappeared mysteriously at sea
