= Commerce (ship) =

Several ships have been named Commerce:

- Commerce (1786 ship) was launched at Bermuda. She initially sailed between London and North America, and later between London and the West Indies. In 1803 new owners dispatched her on a whaling voyage. She may have been lost in late 1806 as she was returning from her voyage; she was last listed in 1806.
- Commerce (1791 ship) was launched at Liverpool in 1791. She was initially a West Indiaman. New owners in 1795 sent Commerce to the southern whale fishery in 1796. The Spanish captured her in 1797, but by 1799 she had returned to British ownership. She then traded generally until a French privateer captured her in 1805.
- Commerce (1797 ship) was launched at Teignmouth. A French privateer captured her in 1800.
- Commerce (1798 ship) was launched at Newfoundland. In 1801 she became a whaler and made three voyages to the southern whale fishery.
- Commerce (1800 ship) was a French vessel launched in 1798 and taken in prize in 1800. Initially she sailed as a West Indiaman. Then between 1801 and the end in 1807 of British participation in the triangular trade in enslaved people Commerce made four voyages as a slave ship and also spent some time in 1803 cruising as a privateer. Afterwards, she continue to trade between Liverpool and West Africa. During one voyage in 1811 a French privateer captured her, but Commerce was recaptured. She was wrecked in November 1813 while returning to Liverpool from South America.
- Commerce (1813 Quebec ship) was launched at Quebec in 1813 and quickly shifted her registry to the United Kingdom. She made one voyage to the East Indies, sailing under a licence from the British East India Company (EIC). She also made one voyage carrying migrants from Greenock to Quebec. She was last listed in 1833.
- Commerce (1813 Prince Edward Island ship) was launched in 1813 at Prince Edward Island. She made one voyage to the East Indies, sailing under a licence from the British East India Company (EIC). She was wrecked in 1823.
- Commerce (1815 ship) was a Connecticut-based American merchant sailing ship that ran aground on 28 August 1815 at Cape Bojador, off the coast of Morocco. Far more famous than the ship itself is the story of the crew who survived the shipwreck, but who went on to become slaves of local tribes that captured them.
