= Patrick Beatson =

Canadian shipbuilder

Patrick Beatson (March 21, 1758 – December 4, 1800) was a Scottish-born mariner who became a ship's captain and, subsequently, a shipbuilder and ship owner.

Beatson was involved in the annual Atlantic convoys from London to Quebec for a number of years. It is possible that during the period from 1781 to 1793, he also spent a number of years learning shipbuilding in a Scottish shipyard, but positive documentation of this is not available.

In 1793, Beatson left the sea and took up residence in Quebec City at the foot of Cap Diamant. He leased a shipyard in that area and became busy in the ship building industry.

Patrick Beatson operated the first important commercial shipyard in Quebec.

== Noteworthy vessels built by Beatson ==
- Monarch, of 600–650 tons (bm), launched in 1800, was the first large vessel built at Quebec.
- Neptune, of 363 tons (bm), launched in 1797, was the first ship built in Quebec after the British occupation.
