= HMS Defender (1804) =

Brig of the Royal Navy

History

United Kingdom
- Name: HMS Defender
- Ordered: 9 January 1804
- Builder: William Courtney, Chester
- Laid down: March 1804
- Launched: 28 July 1804
- Commissioned: August 1804
- Fate: Wrecked 14 December 1809

General characteristics
- Class & type: Archer-class gun-brig
- Tons burthen: 179 tons
- Length: 80 ft 1 1/4 in (24.416 m) (gundeck); 65 ft 10 1/2 in (20.079 m) (keel)
- Beam: 22 ft 7 1/2 in (6.896 m)
- Depth of hold: 9 ft 5 1/2 in (2.883 m)
- Sail plan: Brig
- Complement: 50
- Armament: 10 × 18-pounder carronades + 2 chase guns

HMS Defender was a 12-gun Archer-class gun-brig built in Chester in 1804 and employed in the English Channel. On 14 December 1809, she was wrecked near Folkestone.
