= RFA Growler =

RFA Growler has been the name of two Royal Fleet Auxiliary vessels of the 19th and 20th century:

- RFA Growler (1890), a naval stores carrier of World War I
- RFA Growler (1942), a Bustler-class rescue tug of World War II

== See also ==
- HMS Growler, a list of ships with the same name
