= HMS Woodlark (1805) =

Brig of the Royal Navy

History

United Kingdom
- Name: HMS Woodlark
- Namesake: Woodlark
- Ordered: June 1804
- Builder: Menzies & Goalen, Leith
- Laid down: August 1804
- Launched: January 1805
- Fate: Wrecked 13 November 1805

General characteristics
- Class & type: Archer-class gun-brig
- Tons burthen: 18239/94 bm
- Length: Overall: 80 ft 7 in (24.6 m); Keel: 66 ft 3 1/8 in (20.2 m)
- Beam: 22 ft 9 in (6.9 m)
- Depth of hold: 9 ft 5 in (2.9 m)
- Sail plan: Brig
- Complement: 50
- Armament: 10 × 18-pounder carronades + bow chasers

HMS Woodlark was a gun-brig in the Royal Navy, commissioned c. February 1805 under Lieutenant Thomas Innes and wrecked 13 November 1805.

Woodlark sailed from Lowestoft on 13 November 1805 bound for Plymouth and grounded that evening. The pilot believed that she was on the Goodwin Sands, so Innes fired guns to call for assistance. Around 11pm lights were seen astern and she started to take shots. Despite heavy seas she launched a boat and discovered that she was aground near Calais, France. With France and the United Kingdom at war during the War of the Third Coalition at the time, the boat then ferried Woodlark′s crew ashore to surrender to the French. By the time she was abandoned Woodlark was in a poor state. The subsequent court-martial, held after the crew's release in 1814, found that Innes had carried too much sail and it admonished him to be more careful in the future. The pilot was found to have sailed too far south, having misjudged the distance Woodlark had traveled. As he had been a prisoner of war for nine years, the court-martial board dealt leniently with him, simply admonishing him to be more careful in the future.
