= HMS Poulette (1799) =

History

France
- Name: Foudroyant
- Builder: Bordeaux
- Launched: c.November 1798
- Commissioned: 1798
- Captured: January 1799

Great Britain
- Name: Poulette
- Acquired: January 1799 by capture
- Fate: Sold 1814

General characteristics
- Type: Sixth rate
- Tons burthen: 5138/94 (bm)
- Length: 120 ft 8 in (36.78 m) (overall); 100 ft 4 1/2 in (30.594 m) (keel)
- Beam: 31 ft 0 in (9.45 m)
- Depth of hold: 13 ft 4 in (4.06 m)
- Propulsion: Sails
- Sail plan: Sloop
- Complement: Privateer: 160; British service: 155
- Armament: Privateer: twenty 12 and 6-pounder guns, the former brass; British service: 2 × 9-pounder bow chasers + 16 × 18-pounder carronades; later, 2 × 32-pounder carronades replaced the 9-pounder guns)

HMS Poulette was the French privateer Foudroyant, built and launched at Bordeaux, France in 1798. The Royal Navy captured her in 1799. The British did not commission her until 1803. She was laid up in 1805 and finally sold in 1814.

== Privateer ==
Phoenix captured Foudroyant on 23 January 1799 after a 120-mile chase. She was about three months old, had sailed from Bayonne, and during her nine-week cruise had captured the English brigs Malbridge, sailing from Martinique, and Duncan, sailing from Halifax, both bound to London. She had also captured the American ship Argo, which had been sailing from Sweden to Charlestown.

== Royal Navy service ==
Foudroyant arrived at Plymouth on 18 February 1799. The Admiralty purchased her in 1800, and named her Poulette, there being an HMS Foudroyant in service. She then was laid up.

After the resumption of war with France, the Navy had Poulette fitted as a 24-gun post ship at Portsmouth between May and July 1803. Captain James Dunbar commissioned her in June for Lisbon.

However, by November Poulette was in the Channel, serving under Admiral James Saumarez, who put her to use reconnoitering off Cherbourg. Off Alderney she encountered a French convoy of 30 vessels, escorted by a navy brig and other armed vessels. Poulette was able to drive most of them ashore, where some may have been irretrievably lost. Dunbar then sent in three boats, which succeeded in bringing out a brig, a lugger, and a sloop. All three were new, and though not armed, were fitted with sweeps, suggesting they were fitted for an invasion of England. During the cutting out, Poulette stood close offshore and provided covering fire. In the entire exercise she suffered no casualties. The brig HMS Liberty was in company, but she too ran aground; HMS Moucheron was not able to get her off in time for Liberty to join the action. The captured French vessels were Amis, Leda, and Providence; Poulette, Liberty, and Moucheron shared the prize money.

Poulette visited Newfoundland in 1804. Then she was among eight vessels that shared in the proceeds of her recapture of Flora de Lisboa off Le Havre on 15 September.

On 15 August 1805, Poulette recaptured the packet Prince of Wales. (Note: This may have been the vessel that later sank at Dublin in 1807. See: HM Packet ship Prince of Wales.)

In December Poulette was laid up at Portsmouth.

== Fate ==
The "Principal Officers and Commissioners of His Majesty's Navy" put Poulette up for sale at Portsmouth on 16 March 1814. They sold her on 2 April for £1,000.
