= HMS Biter (1804) =

Brig of the Royal Navy

History

United Kingdom
- Name: HMS Biter
- Ordered: 9 January 1804
- Builder: William Wallis, Blackwall
- Launched: 27 July 1804
- Commissioned: 1805
- Fate: Wrecked 10 November 1805

General characteristics
- Class & type: Archer-class gun-brig
- Tons burthen: 17731/94 (bm)
- Length: Overall:80 ft 0 in (24.4 m); Keel:65 ft 10 1/4 in (20.1 m)
- Beam: 22 ft 6 in (6.9 m)
- Depth of hold: 9 ft 5 in (2.9 m)
- Propulsion: Sails
- Sail plan: Brig
- Complement: 50
- Armament: 10 × 18-pounder carronades + 2 × 12-pounder chase guns

HMS Biter was a 12-gun Archer-class gun-brig of the Royal Navy. She was wrecked in 1805.

== Career ==
Lieutenant George Thomas Wingate commissioned Biter in June 1804.

On 2 November HMS Adder grounded on Romney Flats, about three miles east of Dungeness Light. She did not break up and on 14 November Captain Bolton of HMS Aimable sent Biter and the bomb Vesuvius to Romney Roads to attempt to salvage Adder. They were successful in getting her off and she came away under her own sails.

Biter shared with HMS Autumn and the gun-brigs Manly and Pincher, in the salvage money for George which they retook in February 1805. It was believed that George had been sailing from Bristol to London when a French privateer had captured her and taken her into Boulogne, where her cargo was landed. Autumn and the brigs recaptured George as she was on her way to Calais and they sent her into Dover.

Biter was part of the squadron under the command of Captain Honyman in HMS Leda that on 24 April captured seven armed schuyts in an action within pistol-shot of the shore batteries on Cap Gris Nez. (Note: A schuyt was a Dutch flat-bottomed sailboat, broad in the beam, with square stern; usually equipped with leeboards to serve for a keel.) Biter does not appear to have taken part in the action, but she did share in the prize money.

== Fate ==
Biter was wrecked on 10 November 1805 off Étaples, on France's north coast. She was on blockade duty when during a dark night she ran aground on a beach. Shortly after daybreak she was able to get herself free, but she had been seen. French troops arrived and opened small arms fire. Shore batteries joined in. Biter returned fire, but a shell penetrated her deck forward and went out her bottom without exploding. Water rushed in through the hole the shell had left and her crew ran her aground to avoid sinking.
