= HMS Abundance (1799) =

1799–1823 Royal Navy transport

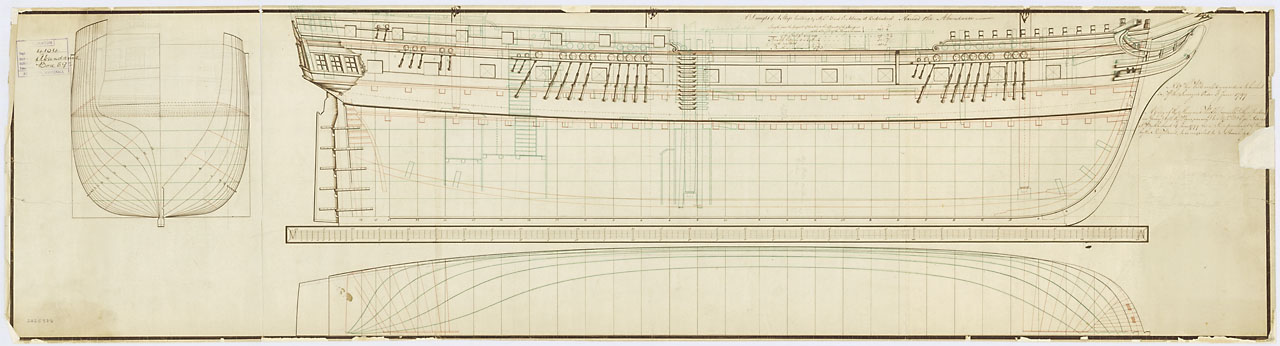
- HMS Abundance (1799) Lines & Profile

History

Great Britain
- Name: HMS Abundance
- Builder: Adams, Bucklers Hard
- Launched: 30 September 1799
- Acquired: June 1799 by purchase
- Commissioned: 1800
- Fate: Sold 1823

General characteristics
- Tons burthen: 673 (bm)
- Length: 119 ft 2 1/4 in (36.3 m) (overall); 142 ft 4 in (43.4 m) (keel)
- Beam: 32 ft 7 in (9.9 m)
- Draught: 8 ft 10 in (2.7 m) (unladen); 12 ft 3 in (3.7 m) (laden)
- Depth of hold: 15 ft 0 in (4.6 m)
- Propulsion: Sails
- Complement: 80
- Armament: 16 × 24-pounder carronades

HMS Abundance was a Royal Navy transport launched and purchased in 1799. During the Napoleonic Wars, she undertook several transatlantic voyages. In April 1814, she conveyed stores and men across the North Atlantic, as part of the build-up at the Great Lakes of the Royal Navy. Following the end of the War of 1812, she was tasked with transporting artificers and Royal Marine Artillery detachments from Canada back to Britain at the end of 1815.

In 1816, she conveyed - from Antwerp to the Port of Civitavecchia - artworks that had been looted by Napoleon, to be returned to the Pope. He, in turn, conferred antiquities and other gifts upon the British crown as a measure of his appreciation. Latterly, she was employed as a storeship at St Helena, and returned to Britain upon the death of Napoleon. The Admiralty sold her in 1823.

== Career ==
Abundance was a mercantile vessel that the Admiralty purchased on the stocks. She was commissioned in 1800 under William Price, Master, for the East Indies. She returned to Woolwich for repairs between October and December 1802, and then returned to the East Indies.

=== French Revolutionary Wars ===
On 5 January 1803 she sailed for the Mediterranean but grounded the next day on Sconce Point, near The Needles, Isle of Wight. Morgiana and Autumn sailed to her assistance. By the 11th they had gotten her off with little damage and she then sailed for Gibraltar.

In early 1804 Captain Lord Cochrane, in Arab, ran into Abundance, after some days earlier having run into another navy vessel, the brig Bloodhound off Boulogne. All vessels survived.

On 1 May 1804 HMS Port Mahon spoke with Abundance off Port Royal, Jamaica. She and her convoy from Portsmouth were "all well". Abundance returned, arriving off Gravesend on 19 August 1804.

=== Napoleonic Wars ===
On 28 January 1806, Abundance sailed from Portsmouth with a fleet for the West Indies. By 23 March she, the storeship William, and ten of the fleet were at Barbados, having separated from the rest of the fleet shortly after their departure from Britain.

In 1806 Abundance came under the command of John Fryer, Master. Then later that year Josiah Oakes, Master, took command. He would remain in command, except for a break in 1812 when W. Kirby temporarily replaced him, until 1815. On 6 November Oakes sailed Abundance for the West Indies.

Abundance sailed to the Cape of Good Hope in December 1807, together with the storeship Sally, under escort by Crocodile. They arrived in March 1808 after a voyage of 12 weeks. They brought recruits for the 29th, 72nd, and 93rd regiments of foot.

=== War of 1812 ===
On 29 September 1812 Abundance departed Portsmouth, in the company of Narcissus, with a convoy of 30 merchantment, and arrived at Port Royal in Jamaica on 26 November 1812.

While under Oakes's command Abundance recaptured Sedulous on 9 February 1813. Sedulous, Mills, master, had been sailing from Cephalonia to Hull when a French privateer had taken her. Sedulous reached Portsmouth on 10 February.

On 2 June 1813 Abundance departed Portsmouth, arriving in the company of Majestic at Halifax on 6 August 1813. Abundance headed for its ultimate destination of Bermuda, to disembark a cargo of naval stores, arriving on 18 September 1813 with Victorious.

The storeships Abundance and Dolphin left Bermuda on 7 December 1813 with a convoy under the escort of Conflict. The merchant vessel Hope left the convoy, and arrived in Liverpool on 5 January 1814 The Abundance and Dolphin arrived at Portsmouth on 27 and 24 January 1814 respectively.

On 4 April 1814, the Abundance departed from the Solent, as part of a convoy, with 700 artificers, seamen and warlike stores, for deployment to the Great Lakes in Canada.

On 3 June 1815, the Abundance, in the company of the Trave and the Weser departed Portsmouth and sailed for Quebec. The storeship Abundance arrived at Halifax on 4 September 1815. It departed Bermuda on 27 September. The storeships Abundance and Coromandel were noted as present in Halifax as of 9 October 1815. Having embarked the artificers, seamen and marines, latterly employed on the Great Lakes, the return journey could set out. Both ships left Halifax on 30 October 1815, and arrived at Portsmouth on 18 and 15 November 1815 respectively.

=== Postwar ===
In May 1816 Abundance left Antwerp with statues and paintings that Napoleon and his officers had stolen; she then conveyed the art safely to the Port of Civitavecchia. The largest item was a statue of the Nile, and weighed 17,600 pounds. Cardinal Ercole Consalvi, Minister of State, came down from Rome on behalf of Pope Pius VII. A large state dinner followed, and the Cardinal invited all of Abundance's officers to come to Rome at the Pope's expense. The officers did so, together with the British consul, travelling in the Pope's own coach. In Rome they immediately met the Pope, with Oakes kissing the Pope's hand three times, and then spent several days being shown the sights, before returning to their vessel. Abundance arrived at Portsmouth on 6 October with 60 cases of statuary and other gifts from the Pope. The Prince Regent, later George IV, wrote the Pope a letter of thanks.

The Abundance returned from the mediterranean, in the company of HMS Queen Charlotte (1810) after reaching the coast of Algiers. After stopping at Plymouth on 1 October, she then arrived at Portsmouth on 6 October, departing for Chatham on 11 October, stopping off at Deal on 13 October 1816.

Later in October the Admiralty delivered Abundance to the Committee for Distressed Seamen as an accommodation ship. However, between August 1818 and March 1819, she underwent modifications for service as a storeship. She then sailed to Saint Helena. At the time she was under the command of Lieutenant Robert Campbell.

Abundance was at Saint Helena when Napoleon died. She then sailed for Britain on 21 June 1821 and was laid up at Deptford in August.

== Fate ==
The Admiralty put Abundance up for sale at Deptford in May 1823. She was sold on the 22nd to Mr. Levy for £2,600.
