= HMS Manly (1804) =

Brig-sloop of the Royal Navy

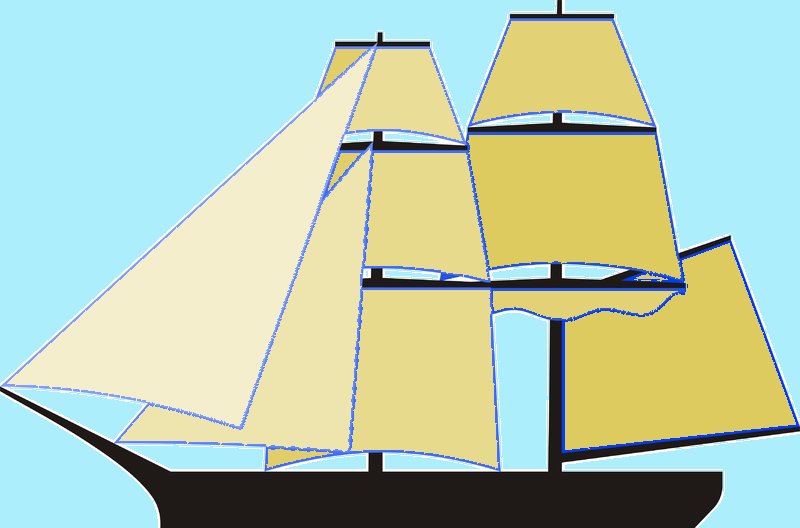
- Configuration of typical brig

History

United Kingdom
- Name: HMS Manly
- Operator: Royal Navy
- Ordered: 9 January 1804
- Builder: John Dudman & Co, Deptford Wharf
- Laid down: February 1804
- Launched: 7 May 1804
- Commissioned: May 1804
- Captured: January 1806

Batavian Republic
- Name: unknown
- Acquired: by capture January 1806
- Captured: 1 January 1809

United Kingdom
- Name: HMS Manly
- Operator: Royal Navy
- Acquired: by capture 1 January 1809
- Captured: 2 September 1811

Denmark & Norway
- Name: HDMS The Manly
- Acquired: 2 September 1811 by capture
- Fate: Captured March 1813 or sold October 1813

United Kingdom
- Name: HMS Bold
- Operator: Royal Navy
- Acquired: March or November 1813
- Fate: Sold 11 August 1814

General characteristics
- Class & type: Archer-class gun-brig
- Tons burthen: 17779/94 (bm)
- Length: 80 ft 1 in (24.41 m) (overall); 66 ft 0 1/2 in (20.130 m) (keel)
- Beam: 22 ft 6 in (6.86 m)
- Depth of hold: 9 ft 5 1/2 in (2.883 m)
- Sail plan: Brig
- Complement: 50
- Armament: British service: 10 × 18-pounder carronades + 2 × 6-pounder chase guns; Dutch service: 12 × 18-pounder carronades + 4 × long brass 6-pounder guns; Danish service: 10 × 18-pounder carronades + 2 × 6-pounder guns

HMS Manly was an Archer-class gun-brig launched in 1804. During her career first the Dutch captured her, then the British recaptured her, then the Danes captured her, and finally the British recaptured her again. The British renamed her HMS Bold after her recapture in 1813. She was sold out of service in 1814.

== Active service as Manly ==
She was commissioned in May 1804 under Lieutenant George Mackay. In 1805 she cruised off Boulogne.

Manly shared with HMS Autumn and the gun-brigs Biter and Pincher, in the salvage money for George which they retook in February 1805. It was believed that George had been sailing from Bristol to London when a French privateer had captured her and taken her into Boulogne, where her cargo was landed. Autumn and the brigs recaptured George as she was on her way to Calais and they sent her into Dover.

=== Capture: British account ===
In January 1806, while under the command of Lieutenant Martin White, she grounded off Rysum, in the River Ems, East Friesland. When White went ashore to supervise attempts to pull her off, a party of Dutchmen from a schuyt landed and captured him. Manly's master, William Golding, then decided to surrender her to Dutch gun-boats. The subsequent court martial stripped Golding of his rank for conduct unbecoming an officer and ordered him to serve a two-year term as a seaman. The board also reprimanded White for not having lightened Manly before trying to pull her off.

=== Capture: Dutch account ===
The Dutch Naval Department held a meeting on 31 December 1805 during which it discussed a report from 25 December by First Lieutenant IJsbrands of the gunboat Vos, who commanded the Dutch vessels serving off Delfzijl. On December IJsbrands had encountered a boat from the galley Noodweer off the Knock that reported that they had approached a brig that had run ashore. It was flying an American flag but appeared to be British. The brig had detained L. Abrahams, the Noodweer's pilot.

IJsbrands sailed back to Delfzijl where he gathered reinforcements from the Noodweer. He then sailed towards the reported location of the brig. On the way he met a boat carrying Lieutenant Martin White, boatswain Peter Graij, gunner James Robinson and sailors Robert Telford and John Wilcolf, whom he arrested and sent to Delfzijl. First though, White requested that he be allowed to retrieve his clothes and money. However, as Vos approached the brig, the British crew fired on her.

At Delfzijl IJsbrands mustered three galleys and on 21 December sent them to deal with the brig. Due to contrary winds the galleys did not reach the brig until 22 December. At that time they discovered that she was the Manly, but that there was no trace of the crew.

== Dutch service ==
To date, no records of her service under the Batavian Republic have emerged.

On 1 January 1809, the 10-gun brig Onyx, with 75 men under Commander Charles Gill, recaptured Manly from the Dutch. Manly and another brig had sailed from the Texel intending to intercept British merchant vessels trading with Heligoland.

The action took two and a half hours, during which the British suffered three wounded, one of whom died later. Manly, which had 94 men, suffered five killed and six wounded. She was under the command of Captain-Lieutenant J.W. Heneyman (or Heeneman) of the Dutch Navy. During her cruise she had taken one small prize, a vessel sailing from Emden to England with a cargo of oats. Manley [sic] arrived in the Humber on 6 January.

The action won a promotion to post-captain for Commander Gill. Lieutenant Edward William Garrett, first of the Onyx, received promotion to the rank of commander. In 1847 the Admiralty awarded the Naval General Service Medal with clasp "Onyx 1 Jany. 1809" to all surviving claimants from the action.

== British service as Manly ==
Manly underwent fitting at Sheerness between February and August 1809. She was recommissioned in June under Lieutenant Thomas Greenwood.

On the night of 29 May 1810, the boats of Desiree, Britomart, Quebec and Bold went into the Vlie to cut out several vessels there. They drove a French lugger of six guns and 26 men ashore, where she was burnt. They then brought out four prizes: a French lugger of 12 guns and 42 men, a French privateer schuyt of four guns and 17 men, a Dutch gun boat and a small row boat. The British suffered no casualties; the enemy lost one man killed and three wounded.

On 17 August 1811 Manly sailed from Sheerness with a convoy for the Baltic under Lieutenant Richard William Simmonds. On 2 September 1811, she was cruising off Arendal on the Norwegian coast in the company of Chanticleer when they encountered three Danish 18-gun-brigs.

=== Capture: British account ===
The Danes engaged Chanticleer until she escaped them. They then turned their attention to Manly. The Danes concentrated their fire on her, cutting her spars and rigging to pieces. Surrounded, with only six guns left, and having lost one man killed and three wounded, Manly was forced to strike. Chanticleer maintained a course away from the action and made good her escape.

A court martial on 6 January 1812 "most honourably acquitted" Lieutenant Simmonds. (Note: On 16 August 1812 the Danes would again capture Lieutenant Simmonds, this time as commander of the gun-brig Attack, after another gallant defense for which loss he would again be honourably acquitted.)

=== Capture: Danish account ===
At 0200hrs on 2 September Alsen (Senior Lieutenant M. Lütken), Lolland (Captain Hans Peter Holm), and Samsø (Senior Lieutenant Ridder Frederick Grodtschilling) were sailing westward along the coast off Randøerne, some 30 miles SE of Arendal, when they sighted two strange vessels that by their night signals appeared to be enemy. The Danes set out in pursuit, with Samsø, which was closest, sailing for the nearest of the enemy vessels with Alsen and Lolland following. However, their quarry turned south-east, and Samsø and Alsen followed. Lolland then set off after the second ship.

By 0340hrs Lolland had caught up with her. Combat began at 0445hrs and at 0540hrs Lolland succeeded in crossing behind her quarry, which then struck at 0555hrs. Lolland sent a prize crew over that brought back Lieutenant Simmonds.

Meanwhile, at 0345hrs Alsen had come within firing range of the ship that Samsø was chasing and there followed a running fight which persevered as well as the rough seas would allow. Samsø had already broken off her chase when Grodtschilling realized the British vessel was too fast for him; Grodtschilling sailed to join and support Lolland. By 0500hrs Alsen's quarry had gained such a lead on the Alsen that Lütken too gave up the pursuit and turned to join Lolland.

Samsø and Alsen came up at 0630hrs and Holm requested that they help man the prize. Holm reported that Lolland had lost one man killed but had had no wounded; neither of the other two Danish vessels had sustained any casualties. Lolland had slight damage to her rigging and sails, but none to her hull; the other two Danish vessels reported negligible damage.

== Danish service as The Manly ==
The Danes took Manly into service, retaining her name and armament. (Note: This can be a problematic link (April 2019). A new Danish website lists details of many Danish warships, but not yet those for captured vessels.)

The Danes commissioned her under Captain Holm but sold her on 28 October 1813. (Note: Holm would go on to become captain of the ill-fated frigate, Najaden.)

== British service as Bold ==
The British recaptured Manly in 1813. They again took her back into service, but renamed her HMS Bold, a new Manly having just been commissioned and the 14-gun brig Bold just having been lost a month or two earlier. (Note: The records are a little murky and contradictory here. The Danes record her as being sold in October 1813, and Winfield has her being captured in November 1813, which are mutually consistent statements. However, Redbreast captured a Danish vessel Manly and her cargo in March 1813. Furthermore, Winfield has the British refitting Manly between 28 August and October 1813, which would be consistent with her recapture by Redbreast, but not with her capture in November.)

== Fate ==
Bold was sold on 11 August 1814 for £940.
