= HMS Autumn =

Sloop of the Royal Navy

History

Great Britain
- Name: Autumn
- Builder: Ann Brodick, Shields
- Launched: 1800
- Fate: Sold 1801

United Kingdom
- Name: HMS Autumn
- Acquired: 28 February 1801 by purchase
- Renamed: HMS Strombolo in 1811
- Fate: Sold 1815

United Kingdom
- Name: Autumn
- Acquired: 1815 by purchase
- Fate: Wrecked 1817

General characteristics
- Tons burthen: 329, or 335, or 33519/94 (bm)
- Length: Overall:98 ft 11 in (30.1 m); Keel:78 ft 6 in (23.9 m)
- Beam: 28 ft 4 in (8.6 m)
- Propulsion: Sail
- Sail plan: sloop
- Complement: Royal Navy:**Sloop:70; Bomb:67; At loss:20
- Armament: Sloop; Upper deck:12 × 24-pounder carronades; QD:2 × 18-pounder carronades; Bomb:1 × 13" mortar + 1 × 10" mortar + 8 × 24-pounder carronades + 2 × 6-pounder guns

HMS Autumn was launched at Shields in 1800 as a merchantman. The Royal Navy purchased her in 1801. The Navy sold her in 1815 and she returned to mercantile service. She was lost in 1818.

== Career ==
Autumn first appeared in the Register of Shipping (RS) with Stocker, master, Brodrick, owner, and voyage Newcastle to London. Perry & Co. sold her to the navy on 28 February 1801.

=== Royal Navy ===
==== Autumn ====
Commander William Richardson commissioned Autumn in February 1801 for the Downs.

On 5 January 1803 HMS Abundance sailed for the Mediterranean but grounded the next day on Sconce Point, near The Needles, Isle of Wight. Morgiana and Autumn sailed to her assistance. By the 11th Abundance had gotten off with little damage and she then sailed for Gibraltar.

Autumn was recommissioned by Commander Samuel Jackson on 10 May 1803. He sailed for the French coast on 31 July.

On 27 September Jackson took a small squadron at Rear Admiral Montagu's behest and bombarded the French gun boats at Calais. The objective of the engagement was to prevent the French at Calais from linking up with the French flotilla at Boulogne. The commencement of a gale forced the British to withdraw. With the British squadron having withdrawn, Over the next two days the French succeeded in getting over 50 boats from Calais to Boulogne.

Early in 1804, a division of the French flotilla was discovered to be sailing along the French coast to Boulogne protected by shore batteries. The British vessels in the area attacked and were able to drive several vessels onto the beach. However, most succeeded in reaching Boulogne. Autumn lost one man killed and six wounded in the operation.

In the evening of 20 July there were more than 80 French brigs and luggers in the roads of Boulogne. As the weather worsened, a number of the vessels set sail. Captain Owen of Immortalite signaled to Harpy, Bloodhound, and Archer to close with the French vessels. Autumn also joined the operation. Although most of the French vessels escaped, the British were able to drive a handful on shore.

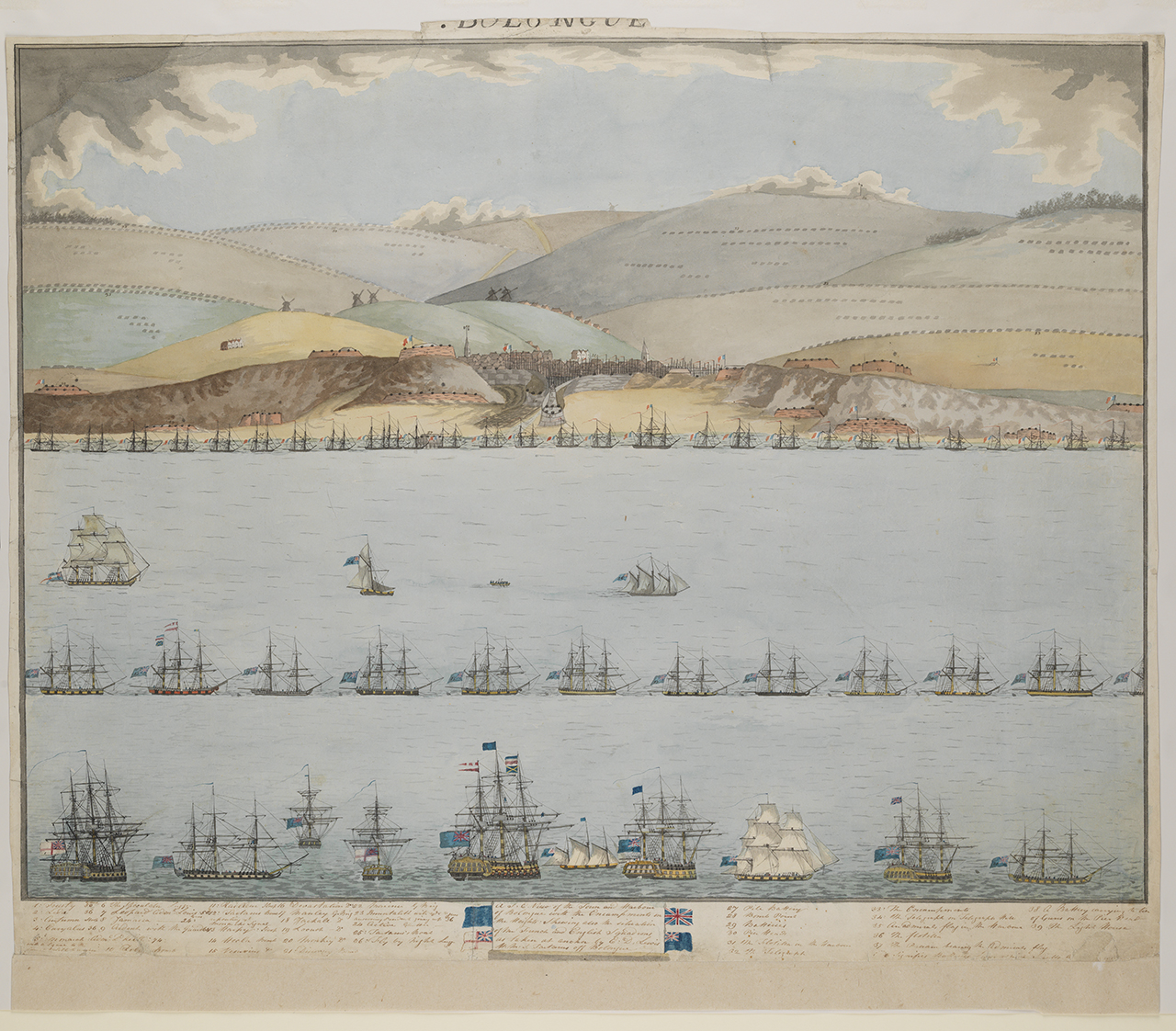
Autumn at the attack on Boulogne October 1804

Autumn also participated in an attack on the Boulogne flotilla on 2 October 1804 using explosive catamarans. He was ordered to lay alongside French Admiral Bruix. As he approached the Admiral's praam the string to operate the clock slipped out of his hand. He broke open the hatch on the catamaran, retrieved the string and stepped into his gig as he pulled it. Twenty-five seconds later the vessel exploded but the explosion did no damage except remove the praam's bowsprit. When Jackson returned to the Downs he was invited to dine with Prime Minister William Pitt, Lord Harrowby, and Lord Melville. Melville promised to promote Jackson, but Melville left office before he could make good on his promise. (Jackson received promotion to post-captain in 1807, after he had left Autumn.)

Commander Thomas Searle assumed command Autumn in October 1804.

Autumn shared with the gun-brigs HMS Biter, Manly, and Pincher, in the salvage money for George which they retook in February 1805. It was believed that George had been sailing from Bristol to London when a French privateer had captured her and taken her into Boulogne, where her cargo was landed. Autumn and the brigs recaptured George as she was on her way to Calais and they sent her into Dover.

In October 1805, Autumn was at Portsmouth where she underwent fitting as a receiving ship. In October 1809 Commander Corbet James d'Auvergne recommissioned her.

==== Strombolo ====
Between December 1810 and May 1811, Autumn was refitted at Portsmouth as a bomb vessel. On 15 February 1811 she was renamed Strombolo. Commander Samuel Grove recommissioned her in March. On 11 December he sailed her for the Mediterranean.

During 1812 she came under the command of Commander Thomas Hichens, Commander John Stoddard on 3 July, then Grove again, and Commander John Smith in August.

By June 1813 Commander John Stoddart had again assumed command of Strombolo.

Between 3 and 7 June 1813, Strombolo, Captain Stoddard, participated in an Army-Navy operation that captured Fort St Philippe in the Coll de Balanguer that controlled the pass on the road between Tortosa to Tarragona. The naval force consisted of HMS Invincible, Thames, Brune, Strombolo, and Volcano, and eight gunboats. Lieutenant James, RMA, landed two 8" mortars from Strombolo and commenced to fire on the fort while guns from squadron were being landed to establish a breaching battery. After the mortar shells blew up the fort's magazine, the garrison surrendered though the battery had not yet commenced fire. Captain Stoddard and Captain Zehnpfennig entered the fort and brought back the surrender offer. Strombolo suffered no casualties in the engagement.

At some point Commander Samuel Grove resumed command. Commander Stoddard again commanded Strombolo in 1814.

==== Disposal ====
The "Principal Officers and Commissioners of His Majesty's Navy" offered "Strombolo bomb, of 320 tons", "lying at Woolwich", for sale on 9 February 1815. She sold on that day for £1,680.

=== Merchantman ===
Her new owners returned Strombolo to her original name of Autumn. She appeared in Lloyd's Register (LR) in 1815 at London with Batchelor, master, and Rattenbury, owner. The next year Lloyd's Register showed her trade as London–Petersburg.

Around 9 September 1815 Autumn, Batchelor, master, put into Revel leaky. She had been traveling from Petersburg to London. It was expected that she would be obliged to discharge her cargo.

Lloyd's Register for 1818 showed Autumn with Bachelor, master, Ratenbury, owner, and trade London–Quebec.

== Fate ==
In February 1818 Lloyd's List reported that Autumn, Batchelor, master, had sailed from Quebec for Dundee on 28 August and had not since been heard of. In April Lloyd's List reported that Autumn had been lost, with all her cargo, on the coast of Iceland on 29 October 1817. All 20 crew members were lost.
