= HMS Furnace (1797) =

Gunvessel of the Royal Navy

History

Great Britain
- Name: GB No.25
- Ordered: 7 February 1797
- Builder: Perry & Co., Blackwall
- Laid down: February 1797
- Launched: 10 April 1797
- Renamed: HMS Furnace
- Fate: Sold 1802

General characteristics
- Class & type: Courser-class gunbrig
- Tons burthen: 16852/94 (bm)
- Length: Overall:76 ft 2 in (23.2 m); Keel:62 ft 6 3/8 in (19.1 m)
- Beam: 22 ft 6 1/2 in (6.9 m)
- Depth of hold: 8 ft 3 in (2.5 m)
- Armament: 2 × 24-pounder bow chase guns + 10 × 18-pounder carronades

HMS Furnace was a Courser-class gunvessel launched in 1797 and sold in 1802.

== Career ==
Lieutenant Maurice William Suckling commissioned Furnace in May 1797.

In May 1798 she participated in Sir Home Popham's failed attack on Ostend.

Furnace took part in the Anglo-Russian invasion of Holland in 1799. On 28 August 1799, the fleet captured several Dutch hulks and ships in the New Diep, in Holland. Furnace was listed among the vessels qualifying to share in the prize money. Furnace was also present at the subsequent Vlieter Incident on 30 August.

On 14 September 1801 Lieutenant Suckling faced a Court-martial on board Waaksaamheidt, at Sheerness. The Court found him guilty of part of the charges of neglect of duty and absenting himself without leave. It ordered that he be superseded from Furnace.

Following the signing of the Peace of Amiens, Furnace was paid off on 18 October 1801 at Sheerness.

== Fate ==
The "Principal Officers and Commissioners of His Majesty's Navy" offered "Furnace, 169 Tons, Copper-bottomed, lying at Sheerness", for sale on 7 October 1802. She sold there on that date.
