= HMS Griper (1797) =

Brig of the Royal Navy

History

Great Britain
- Name: GB No.27
- Ordered: 7 February 1797
- Builder: Thomas Pitcher, Northfleet
- Laid down: February 1797
- Launched: 10 April 1797
- Commissioned: May 1797
- Fate: Sold 1802

General characteristics
- Class & type: Courser-class gunbrig
- Tons burthen: 1696/94 (bm)
- Length: Overall:76 ft 1 1/4 in (23.2 m); Keel:62 ft 2 1/2 in (19.0 m)
- Beam: 22 ft 6 1/4 in (6.9 m)
- Depth of hold: 8 ft 3 in (2.5 m)
- Armament: 2 × 24-pounder bow chase guns + 10 × 18-pounder carronades

HMS Griper was a Courser-class gunvessel launched in 1797 and sold in 1802.

== Career ==
Lieutenant James Ryder commissioned Griper in May 1797. In May 1798 Lieutenant Malcolm Cowan replaced Ryder. She underwent coppering at Portsmouth in June. Lieutenant Edward Hodge commanded Griper in 1799. On 19 August Griper arrived in Sunderland. She had been on a "private expedition" when she had lost her topmasts. She left the fleet off the Texel a week or so earlier. She had rigged jury-masts and Sunderland was the first port she could reach. She had 19 soldiers aboard; al were well.

Lieutenant Mathew Graham commanded Griper in 1800. Lieutenant Henry Fyge Jauncey commanded Griper in the Baltic in 1801. On 14 April Griper was at Sheerness. A midshipman, her surgeon, a pilot, a marine, and five seamen were in it sailing from Griper into the Nore when a gale overturned the boat. The midshipman and three seamen drowned. On 21 April Griper sailed for the Baltic in company with a number of other brigs and larger warships. She returned to Yarmouth on 21 July. In August she cruised off the coast of France. In April 1802 orders came that Griper was to be paid off.

== Fate ==
The "Principal Officers and Commissioners of His Majesty's Navy" offered "Griper, 169 Tons, Copper-bottomed, lying at Sheerness", for sale on 17 October 1802. She sold there on that date.
