= USRC Vigilant (1797) =

Ship of the U.S. Revenue Cutter Service (1797)

History

United States
- Name: Vigilant
- Operator: Revenue Cutter Service
- Launched: 1797
- Commissioned: 1797
- Decommissioned: 1812

General characteristics
- Propulsion: Sail

Vigilant (launched 1801) was the second of twelve cutters of the Revenue Marine, or Revenue Cutter Service, later the United States Coast Guard, to bear the name, Vigilant.

== Operational history ==
Vigilant was commanded by Jno. W. Leonard who was commissioned as a captain in the Revenue Marine on May 31, 1798 in New York. W.S. Jno. Squire was commissioned as first mate on Dec 31, 1797 in New York. N. Harriott was commissioned as third mate on Mar 1, 1797 in New York. W. Oliver was commissioned as third mate on Dec 31, 1798 in New York.
