= Speculator (1797 ship) =

History

Great Britain
- Name: Speculator
- Launched: 1797, Thames

General characteristics
- Tons burthen: 100, or 161, or 169, or 183 (bm)

Speculator was launched in 1797 on the Thames. She may have served the British government between her launch and 1803. She then made one voyage as a whaler in the British southern whale fishery. What happened to her after her return is currently obscure.

== Career ==
Speculator first appeared in Lloyd's Register (LR) in the volume for 1802.

Year	Master	Owner	Trade	Source
1802	J.Mildrum	Herbert	London–Southern fishery	LR

Speculator was valued at £2,000 in 1802.

Captain J. Mildrum (or Melden, Maldon, or Meldon), sailed from London on 25 May 1803, bound for the southern whale fishery. On 5 March 1804 Speculator arrived at Saint Helena. She left on 15 March. As she crossed the equator she fell in with three ships flying British colours. One was a corvette of 20 guns and one was a large Dutch ship. Mildrum assumed they were a convoy from the Cape, at least until the corvette fired on Speculator. Speculator fled, firing her stern guns at her pursuers. She escaped and arrived safely at Ilfracombe prior to 2 May.

The articles reporting this engagement mentioned that Speculator was a former gunbrig, and had false guns mounted. There is no record of a gun-brig named Speculator during the period 1793 to 1817, either belonging to the Royal Navy or a hired armed vessel. It is possible that the Royal Navy purchased her and sailed her under another name, but there is no obvious candidate.

Speculator remained listed in LR for some years, but with stale data. One source states that she was employed in the fishery during 1803 and 1807. However, there was no further press mention of a Speculator, Mildrum, master, after 1804.
