= HMS Morgiana (1800) =

Brig of the Royal Navy

History

France
- Name: Actif
- Launched: 1799
- Captured: 1800

Great Britain
- Name: HMS Morgiana
- Acquired: 1800 by capture
- Fate: Broken up 1811

General characteristics
- Tons burthen: 282 92/94 (bm)
- Length: 95 ft 8 in (29.2 m) (overall); 76 ft 0 in (23.2 m) (keel)
- Beam: 26 ft 5 1/2 in (8.1 m)
- Depth of hold: 11 ft 11 1/2 in (3.6 m)
- Sail plan: Brig
- Complement: Privateer:137; British service: 90
- Armament: Privateer: 14 × 6-pounder + 2 × 12-pounder guns; British service; Upper deck: 14 × 18-pounder carronades; QD:2 × 6-pounder guns

HMS Morgiana was the French privateer Actif, launched at Bordeaux in 1799. After Thames captured her in 1800, the Royal Navy took her into service as Morgiana. She served in the Mediterranean, where she captured one small privateer. She was laid up in 1807 and broken up in 1811.

== Origins and capture ==
Actif was built at Bordeaux in 1799.

On 30 November 1800 Thames captured Actif in the Bay of Biscay, 15 leagues from the Tower of Corduan, after a six-hour pursuit. Actif was armed with fourteen 6-pounder and two brass 12-pounder guns. She had a crew of 137 men and this was the first day of her first cruise. Captain William Lukin of Thames described her as "a particularly fine new Vessel, Coppered". Actif arrived at Plymouth on 19 December.

== British service ==
The Royal Navy took Actif into service as HMS Morgiana. She underwent fitting out at between May and July 1801, with Commander Charles Otter commissioning her in May. On 20 July orders arrived at Plymouth for Morgiana to fit for foreign service, probably Egypt.

Carmen and Morgiana arrived at Spithead on 9 November 1801, from Egypt. Morgiana had left 18 days after Carmen but arrived an hour earlier. Morgiana brought with her duplicate dispatches concerning the evacuation of forces after the fall of Alexandria on 2 September, and General Moore as a passenger.

Between 15 and 16 January 1802 a number of warships, under the command of Rear Admiral George Campbell in Temeraire, dropped down to St. Helen's. On 7 February the following vessels departed St Helens with sealed orders, with the press believing they were bound for Jamaica: Temeraire, Formidable, Resolution, Vengeance, Orion, Majestic, Desiree, and Morgiana. All but Desiree and Morgiana were ships of the line. Morgiana arrived at Portsmouth on 17 May from Martinique.

Captain Robert Raynsford (or Rainsford) was appointed on 25 May to command Morgiana. He commissioned her in June.<

In June 1802 Commander Robert Raynsford (or Rainsford) assumed command of Morgiana. Between June and October Morgiana cruised in the Channel. Raynsford recommissioned her in October.

At Portsmouth, Mr. Solomon Bostick, boatswain of Morgiana, was tried aboard Donegal for repeated neglect of duty. The court martial board sentenced Bostick to be reprimanded for staying beyond his leave, and to be admonished not to absent himself from duty in future.

On 10 January 1803 Morgiana sailed to join Autumn in assisting the salvage of the store ship Abundance, which had gone on shore on Sconce Point near the Needles while on her way to the Mediterranean. The rescuers succeeded in their mission and Abundance sailed on to Gibraltar. Morgiana and the gun-brig Locust sailed for Ireland on 14 January to raise seamen. Morgiana returned on 2 February and sailed for Lymington on 14 March, bringing back seamen for the fleet the following day.

On 17 March Morgiana and Juno were stationed at St. Helens as guardships. On 28 March Morgiana sailed from Portsmouth for Jersey returning on 26 April with seamen. On 5 May the Admiralty ordered Morgiana, then at Portsmouth, prepared and provisioned for foreign service, believed to be the West Indies, and to sail immediately to Plymouth. Later in the year she sailed for the Mediterranean.

Between 1 and 3 August, Juno and Morgiana captured three vessels: Santissima Trinita, Parthenope, and Famosa. Then on the 21st, Juno and Morgiana captured San Giorgio.

Morgiana captured Margueritta on 12 October. (Note: Prize money was paid in 1827. A first-class share of the prize money was worth £54; a fifth-class share, that of aseaman, was worth 12 s 2 1/4d.)

While chasing two vessels off Cape Spartivento, the southernmost point of Sardinia, on 15 October 1803, Morgiana found herself being chased by a lateen-rigged vessel flying English colours that swept out from the coast. When the pursuer came within gunshot she discovered that she was attacking a warship. After Morgiana fired several shots, the vessel hoisted French colours and anchored. Raynsford sent in Morgiana's boats. Although they came under grape and musket fire, the crews were able to board their objective and capture her. She was the French privateer Marguerite, armed with two 6-pounders and two 4-pounders. Of her crew of 40, at the end only three remained on board, the others having swum ashore. Morgiana's sole casualty was one seaman mortally wounded.

On 16 January 1804 Morgiana captured Intrepide. (Note: Prize money was paid in 1827. A first-class share of the prize money was worth £107 19s 7 1/2d; a fifth-class share was worth £1 2s 5 3/4d.) The capture took place at the island of Milo (probably Milos, in the Aegean Sea).

On 28 April 1804 she arrived at Malta convoying 2 merchantmen from Trieste (placed here because the "fish ships" comment is undated).

Captain Schomberg, of Madras, at Malta, sent Morgiana into the Adriatic with the "Fish Ships". (Note: Fish ships were British merchant vessels carrying fish, perhaps cod from Newfoundland or herring from the North Sea.) Admiral Nelson, when informed of the instructions, concurred in them, adding only that he trusted that Schomberg had instructed Raynsford to bring [back] with him the merchant vessels going to Malta or England.

On 1 December 1805 Morgiana detained the Sicilian ship Divine Providence. Divine Providence was sailing from Palermo to Genoa with a varied cargo. She had a crew of 9 men and was of 50 tons (bm).

By November 1806 Morgiana was under the command of Captain Thomas Landless. While off Cadiz, Raynsford had been promoted to post captain and command of Madras.

In January 1807 Morgiana was under the command of Captain James Slade, off Cadiz. However, Captain Landless appears to have remained in command until August.

Late on 21 May 1807, Commander William Raitt of Scout sent his boats and those of Morgiana in pursuit of several vessels spotted sailing past Cape Trafalgar with the aim of clearing the Straits under cover of darkness. The boats succeeded in capturing the privateer San Francisco Settaro (or Francisco Solano, or Determinada). The privateer fired heavily on the boats before they captured her, killing one seaman from Scout, and wounding another. San Francisco Settaro was armed with one 18-pounder gun in her bow and two other carriage guns, together with swivels and small arms, and had a crew of 29 men. Raitt described his prize "a large Vessel, about Three Months old, and in my Opinion well calculated for the Gun Boat Service at Gibraltar."

Three days later, Vice-Admiral Cuthbert Collingwood, Commander in Chief for the Mediterranean, wrote in a letter to William Marsden that Scout, Morgiana, and Redwing had been employed "scouring the Gut of the Enemy". Furthermore, "within this Fortnight past they have taken and destroyed Eighteen of the Enemy's Vessels".

Morgiana returned to Chatham later in the year. She was laid up in ordinary at Chatham in August 1807.

== Fate ==
The Principal Officers and Commissioners of His Majesty's Navy offered the "Morgiana Sloop, of 283 Tons" for sale at Chatham on 21 February 1811. She did not sell immediately but was broken up in August.
