= HMS Tigress (1797) =

Brig of the Royal Navy

History

Great Britain
- Name: GB No. 45
- Ordered: March 1797
- Builder: Thomas Pitcher, Northfleet
- Laid down: March 1797
- Launched: 11 September 1797
- Renamed: HMS Tigress
- Fate: Sold January 1802

General characteristics
- Class & type: Courser-class gun-brig
- Tons burthen: 16852/94 (bm)
- Length: Overall: 76 ft 0 in (23.16 m); Keel: 62 ft 2 5/8 in (18.964 m)
- Beam: 22 ft 6 in (6.86 m)
- Depth of hold: 8 ft 3 in (2.51 m)
- Sail plan: Brig
- Complement: 50
- Armament: 10 × 18-pounder carronades + 2 chase guns

HMS Tigress was a Courser-class gun-brig built for the British Royal Navy at King's Lynn, and laid down in 1797 as GB No. 45; she was renamed Tigress on 7 August the same year. She was sold on 20 January 1802.

== Career ==
Lieutenant John Wyatt commissioned Tigress in November 1797.

Tygress took part in the Anglo-Russian invasion of Holland in 1799. On 28 August 1799, the fleet captured several Dutch hulks and ships in the New Diep, in Holland. Tigress was listed among the vessels qualifying to share in the prize money. Furnace was also present at the subsequent Vlieter Incident on 30 August.

Lieutenant William H.B.Tremlett took command in 1800.

She was part of the North Sea Fleet and so participated in the head money for the Battle of Copenhagen in 1801. Admiral Lord Nelson, in letter, remarked on "with the exception of the glaring misconduct of the Officers of the Tigress and Cracker gun brigs". Unfortunately, it is not clear what the glaring misconduct was.

In 1801 Lieutenant William Davies took command of Tigress in the Baltic.

On 20 and 21 August HMS Jamaica's boats and several vessels were involved in action in the neighbourhood of Étaples. On the evening of 20 August, Jamaica was off Etaples when she heard cannon fire and lookouts saw a large fire. Captain Jonas Rose sailed to investigate, encountering Hound, which informed him that the fire came from a cargo of pitch and tar on a vessel wrecked on the coast some time previously that boats from Hound and Mallard had set on fire. Six flat boats had come out of Saint Valery but Hound had forced them onshore, where they still lay. The following morning Rose sent in boats from Jamaica, the brig sloops Hound and Gannet, and the gunbrigs Mallard and Tygress. As the boats went in the ships themselves provided covering fire. The boats brought out two launches and a flat boat, 45' long and 24' wide, armed with an 8" howitzer. However, the latter later sank; the other three on shore had already been so damaged that they were irretrievable, but the landing party still did as much further damage as time permitted. Tigress lost one man slightly wounded.

Disposal: "The Principal Officers and Commissioners of His Majesty's Navy" offered "Tigress, Gun Vessel 168 tons, lying at Sheerness" for sale on 20 January 1802. She was sold in January.
