= Perseverance (1799 ship) =

History
- Name: Unknown
- Owner: Various
- Launched: 1797
- Fate: Sold 1799

Great Britain
- Name: Perseverance
- Owner: Various
- Acquired: 1799
- Fate: Wrecked July 1803

General characteristics
- Tons burthen: 323, or 340 (bm)
- Propulsion: Sails
- Sail plan: Full-rigged ship

Perseverance was built in 1797 at Stettin or Sweden and came into British hands in 1799. She made one voyage under charter to the British East India Company (EIC), and was lost in July 1803.

== Career ==
Perseverance was built either in Stettin, then part of Prussia, or Sweden. One source states the firm of Prinsep and Saunders purchased her, but she first appears in Lloyd's Register with Ord, master, and Herbert, owner. Her trade is London—Demerara.

Lloyd's Register for 1801 gives her master as Dorwick, her owner as Woods & Co., and her trade as London—Bengal. Perseverance sailed from Portsmouth on 9 January 1801. Messrs. Princip and Saunders had tendered Perseverance, Nathaniel Downick, master, to the EIC to bring back rice from Bengal. She was one of 28 vessels that sailed between December 1800 and February 1801 on that mission.

She arrived at Calcutta on 24 May. Homeward bound, she reached St Helena on 31 December, and arrived at the Downs on 21 February 1802.

On her return Captain Dorwick, or Downick, purchased her, though the Register of Shipping shows her owner as Dixon & Co. Under Captain J. Goodwin she then sailed to Honduras. In 1803 she was under the command of Stevenson, with Dorwick, owner, and trade London—Memel.

== Fate ==
Lloyd's List reported on 19 July 1803 that Perseverance had been wrecked on the Memel Bar in the Baltic Sea during voyage from Memel to London.
