= HMS Cracker (1797) =

Brig of the Royal Navy

History

Great Britain
- Name: HMS Cracker
- Ordered: 7 February 1797
- Builder: John Dudman & Co., Deptford
- Laid down: February 1797
- Launched: 25 April 1797
- Fate: Sold 1802

General characteristics
- Class & type: Acute-class gunbrig
- Tons burthen: 16113/94(bm)
- Length: Overall: 75 ft 1 1/2 in (22.90 m); Keel: 61 ft 7 7/8 in (18.8 m)
- Beam: 22 ft 2 in (6.76 m)
- Depth of hold: 8 ft 0 in (2.44 m)
- Complement: 50
- Armament: 10 × 18-pounder carronades + 2 × 24-pounder chase guns

HMS Cracker was an Acute-class gunbrig, launched in 1797. She was sold in 1802.

== Career ==
Lieutenant Thomas Aitkinson commissioned Cracker in May 1797.

On 28 August 1799, Cracker was with the British fleet that captured the Dutch hulks Drotchterland and Brooderschap, and the ships Helder, Venus, Minerva, and Hector, in the New Diep, in Holland. A partial pay-out of prize money resulted in a payment of 6s 8d to each seaman that had been in the fleet that day. The capture of these vessels was part of the Anglo-Russian invasion of Holland and preceded by two days the Vlieter incident in which a large part of the navy of the Batavian Republic, commanded by Rear-Admiral Samuel Story, surrendered to the British navy on a sandbank near the Channel known as De Vlieter, near Wieringen. Cynthia was also among the vessels sharing in the prize money from the Dutch vessels of the Vlieter Incident.

Cracker shared with the sloop Dart and the gunbrigs Defender and Hasty in the proceeds of the capture of Hell Hound. This may have occurred on 7 October 1799 when Dart, Defender, Cracker, Hasty, and the schuyt Isis cut out four gunboats from the Pampus, in the Zuiderzee. Three of the gunboats were schuyts, but one was a new, purpose-built gunboat armed with two 18-pounder guns in her bow and two 18-pounder carronades in her broadside. The three schuyts also carried four guns and carronades each. The vessels had crews ranging in size from 20 to 30 men. The British suffered no casualties.

Between 1800 and 1801 Cracker was under the command of Lieutenant Thomas O'Brien. She was coppered in February 1801.

Cracker was part of the North Sea Fleet but did not participate in the head money for the Battle of Copenhagen in 1801. Admiral Lord Nelson, in letter, remarked on "with the exception of the glaring misconduct of the Officers of the Tigress and Cracker gun brigs". Unfortunately it is not clear what the glaring misconduct was.

The division of the North Sea fleet commanded by Admiral Thomas in HMS Polyphemus returned to Yarmouth from the Baltic Sea on 13 July and then sailed to join Admiral Dickson's squadron blockading the Dutch fleet in the Texel. (Note: Dickson's squadron included Veteran, Ruby, Otter, Vesuvius, Bruizer, Cracker, Hasty, Teazer, Pincher, Alecto, Sulphur, Explosion, Speedwell, Queen, Espiegle, and the hired armed lugger Speculator.) At some point Graves transferred his flag to Defiance.

Lieutenant James Watson assumed command of Cracker in August 1801.

== Fate ==
The "Principal Officers and Commissioners of His Majesty's Navy" first offered the "Cracker Gun-Vessel, 161 Tons, Copper-bottomed and fastened, and Copper Braces and Pintles, lying at Sheerness", for sale on 1 December 1802. Cracker was sold at Sheerness in December.

== Sources ==
- Winfield, Rif (2008). British Warships in the Age of Sail 1793–1817: Design, Construction, Careers and Fates. Seaforth Publishing. ISBN 978-1-86176-246-7.
