= HMS Oroonoko (1805) =

Brig of the Royal Navy

History

United Kingdom
- Name: HMS Oroonoko
- Namesake: Oroonoko
- Acquired: 1805 by purchase
- Fate: Sold 1814

General characteristics
- Tons burthen: 250 (bm)
- Length: Overall: 81 ft 9 in (24.9 m); Keel: 70 ft 5 in (21.5 m)
- Beam: 25 ft 10 in (7.9 m)
- Armament: 8 × 18-pounder carronades

HMS Oroonoko was the French privateer Eugène, which the Royal Navy bought in 1805 to replace the previous Oroonoko as a prison ship at Port-of-Spain, Trinidad. She was sold in 1814.

Eugène may have been the sloop sailing from Bordeaux to New Orleans that HMS Renard captured early in 1805 and sent into Jamaica.
