= Neptune (1797 ship) =

History

Great Britain
- Name: Neptune
- Builder: Patrick Beatson, Quebec
- Launched: 1797
- Captured: May 1809

General characteristics
- Tons burthen: 363, or 364 (bm)
- Length: 117 ft (36 m), or 111 ft (34 m)
- Beam: 27 ft (8 m)

Neptune, launched in 1797, was the first ship built in Quebec after the British occupation. She sailed to England where she became a West Indiaman. A French privateer captured her in 1809.

== Career ==
Neptune was the first ship built in Quebec after the British occupation. She sailed to England where she became a West Indiaman. She first appeared in Lloyd's Register (LR) in 1798.

Year	Master	Owner	Trade	Source
1798	Patterson	Davidson	London–Quebec	LR
1800	J.Mason	Thelluson	London–Martinique	LR
1806	J.Mason; Brown	Thelluson; Brown & Co.	London–Martinique; London–Jamaica	LR
1807	Brown; A.J.Wilson	Brown; W.Forbes	London–Jamaica; Liverpool–St Thomas	LR
1809	A.Wilson	W.Forbes	Liverpool–St Thomas	LR

== Fate ==
Prior to 17 May 1809, the French corvette Mouche, of 16 guns and 150 men, was cruising some 100 miles from Scilly . Mouche captured:

- the Spanish ship Neptune,
- Neptune, Wilson, master, sailing from Liverpool to the West Indies,
- Success, of and for Jersey, from St Michaels,
- Betsey, of Bridport, from the Canaries,
- a Swedish brig, and
- a Portuguese brig.

Mouche put the captured crews aboard Betsey and let them leave.

LR for 1809 carried the annotation "captured" by Neptune's name. The Register of Shipping for 1809 carried Neptune, Wilson, master, built in Quebec; she was no longer listed in 1810.

Mouche appears to have captured two vessels named Neptune, both with Wilson, master. The second Neptune, of 300 tons, Thomas Wilson, master, was sailing from Lancaster to St Thomas when Mouche captured her on 22 April. The passengers who were left on board and some Spaniards of the prize crew recaptured her and took her into Madeira on 5 May. She continued to appear in subsequent issues of LR and the Register of Shipping.
