= HMS Defender (1797) =

Gunboat of the Royal Navy

History

Great Britain
- Name: HMS Defender (ex-GB No. 21)
- Ordered: 7 February 1797
- Builder: Hill & Mellish, Limehouse
- Laid down: February 1797
- Launched: 21 May 1797
- Commissioned: June 1797
- Fate: Sold in September 1802

General characteristics
- Class & type: Courser-class gun-brig
- Tons burthen: 16829/94 (bm)
- Length: 76 ft 1 in (23.19 m) (gundeck); 62 ft 3 1/4 in (18.980 m) (keel)
- Beam: 22 ft 6 1/2 in (6.871 m)
- Depth of hold: 8 ft 3 in (2.51 m)
- Sail plan: Brig
- Complement: 50
- Armament: 10 × 18-pounder carronades; 2 × 24-pounder guns as chasers

Launched on 21 May 1797, GB No. 21 was renamed HMS Defender on 7 August the same year. She was a 12-gun Courser-class gun-brig built for the British Royal Navy at Limehouse and disposed of in 1802.

== Design and construction ==
The Courser class was designed by Sir William Rule, the Surveyor of the Navy and although at first intended as gunboats, and therefore only had numbers, on 7 August 1797 they were reclassified as gun-brigs, and were given names. The class were fitted with a Schank sliding keel and armed with ten 18-pounder carronades and two long 24-pounders.

== Career ==
Defender was commissioned under the command Lieutenant Samuel P. Leavey at Portsmouth. She underwent coppering there in September 1798.

Between August and October 1799 she was engaged on an expedition to Holland.

Defender shared with the sloop Dart and the gunboats Cracker, and Hasty in the proceeds of the capture of Hell Hound. This may have occurred on 7 October when Dart, Defender, Cracker, Hasty, and the schuyt Isis cut out four gunboats from the Pampus, in the Zuiderzee. Three of the gunboats were schuyts, but one was a new, purpose-built gunboat armed with two 18-pounder guns in her bow and two 18-pounder carronades in her broadside. The three schuyts also carried four guns and carronades each. The vessels had crews ranging in size from 20 to 30 men. The British suffered no casualties.

In February 1801 she underwent refitting at Pitcher, Northfleet. She then sailed for the Baltic.<

== Fate ==
Defender was, along with many of her class, disposed of in 1802 during the short-lived Peace of Amiens. The "Principal Officers and Commissioners of His Majesty's Navy" offered "Defender Gun-Vessel, 168 Tons, Copper-bottomed, lying at Sheerness" for sale on 9 September 1802. She sold there in that month.
