= Cambridge (1797 ship) =

History

Great Britain
- Name: Cambridge
- Namesake: Cambridge
- Owner: Various
- Builder: Whitby
- Launched: 1797
- Fate: Condemned 1810

General characteristics
- Tons burthen: 351 (bm)
- Armament: 4 × 6-pounder guns

Cambridge was launched at Whitby in 1797. She traded with New York, and then with Jamaica. In 1805 a French privateer captured her, but the British Royal Navy recaptured her shortly thereafter and she returned to her trade as a West Indiaman. In 1810 she sustained damage while sailing from Jamaica to Liverpool and was condemned at Havana.

== Career ==
Cambridge entered Lloyd's Register (LR)) in the 1798 volume with J. Nevins, master, Fletcher & Co., owner, and trade Liverpool–New York.

Year	Master	Owner	Trade	Source
1800	J.Nevin	Fletcher & Co. Wallers & Co.	Liverpool–New York; Liverpool–Jamaica	LR
1805	R.Lewis; T.Smith	Fletcher & Co.	Liverpool–Jamaica	LR

On 3 February 1805 HMS Moucheron recaptured Cambridge, Lewes, master, and her cargo. The French privateer Braave, of 18 guns and 160 men, had captured Cambridge while she was on her way from Jamaica to Liverpool. After her recapture by Moucheron, Cambridge reached Cork on 14 February. Her master then became Catrill (or Cottrel, or Catterall, or Cotterell). On 6 June 1805 he sailed from Cork for Jamaica.

Year	Master	Owner	Trade	Source & notes
1806	T.Smith; Cotterell	Fletcher & Co.	Liverpool–Jamaica	LR
1810	Catrill	Fletcher & Co.	Liverpool–Jamaica	RS; small repairs 1806
1810	S. Cattrall	Fletcher	London–Jamaica	LR; repair 1807 and large repair 1800

== Fate ==
Lloyd's List for 29 January 1811 reported that Cambridge, Duncan, master, had had to put into Havana with damage. In June Lloyd's List reported that she had been condemned and sold there with her cargo.

Lloyd's Register for 1812 has the notation "cndmnd" by her name. For much of the period 1807–1814 Lloyd's Register confused this Cambridge and Cambridge; the Register of Shipping was more careful. Because of the stale data in Lloyd's Register, one source still showed Cambridge (of Whitby), as being owned by Fletcher in 1814.
