= Whydah (1797 ship) =

History

Great Britain
- Name: Whydah
- Namesake: Ouidah
- Builder: Whitby
- Launched: 1797
- Fate: Wrecked 6 January 1803

General characteristics
- Tons burthen: 254 (bm)

Whydah was launched in 1797 at Whitby as a West Indiaman. She was captured but returned or remained in her owners' hands. She was wrecked in January 1803.

Whydah first appeared in Lloyd's Register (LR) in 1798 with Frisstle, master, Fletcher, owner, and trade Liverpool–Jamaica.

In October 1801 Whydah was in company with Leviathan and sailing from the north side of Jamaica to Port Antonio to join a homeward-bound convoy. Two feluccas captured them after a severe engagement.

Despite the report, Whydah returned or remained in British hands. LR for 1802 showed her master changing from J.M'Neil to R.Balfour, her owner from Walker & Co. to M'Allister & Co., and her trade from Liverpool–Jamaica to Greenock–Savannah.

Whydah, Balfour, master, was wrecked on 6 January 1803 on Martin's Industry Shoal, in the Atlantic Ocean 55 nautical miles (102 km) off Savannah, Georgia, United States. She was on a voyage from the Clyde. The crew and part of the cargo were saved.
