= HMS Growler (1797) =

Courser-class gun-brig built for the British Royal Navy

History

Great Britain
- Name: GB No. 26
- Ordered: 7 February 1797
- Builder: Thomas Pitcher, Northfleet
- Laid down: February 1797
- Launched: 10 April 1797
- Renamed: HMS Growler
- Captured: 21 December 1797

France
- Name: Growler
- Acquired: November 1798 by purchase of a prize
- Fate: Seized 1 August 1809

General characteristics
- Class & type: Courser-class gun-brig
- Displacement: Unladen:132 tons; Laden:180 tons
- Tons burthen: 16852/94 (bm)
- Length: Overall: 76 ft 2 in (23.22 m); Keel: 62 ft 4 3/8 in (19.009 m)
- Beam: 22 ft 6 1/2 in (6.871 m)
- Depth of hold: 8 ft 3 in (2.51 m)
- Sail plan: Brig
- Complement: Royal Navy:50; French Navy:37-–47 men
- Armament: Royal Navy:10 × 18-pounder carronades + 2 × 24-pounder chase guns; French Navy:2 × 32-pounder carronades forward + 10 × 16-pounder carronades + 2 × 8-pounder guns

HMS Growler was a Courser-class gun-brig built for the British Royal Navy at Northfleet and launched in 1797 as GB No. 26; she was renamed Growler on 7 August the same year.

Lieutenant William Wall commissioned Growler in May. In August Lieutenant John Hollingsworth replaced Wall.

Capture: The French privateers Espiègle and Rusé captured Growler off Dungeness on 21 December 1797. Growler was escorting a convoy in the Channel on a moonless night when the two privateers approached. They mistook her for a merchantman, ran close on either side and called on her to surrender. The officer of the watch, taken by surprise, fired a gun. Both privateers immediately came alongside and threw grapnels on to her. After the British managed to cut the grapnels on one side, the privateer on that side fell away and fired a broadside before again coming alongside. The privateers sent boarding parties over the side. Lieutenant Hollingsworth was shot and died in the ensuing struggle. The British were then forced to strike. (Note: Espiègle was a privateer from Boulogne commissioned in December 1797 under Jean-Pierre-Antoine Duchenne, with 80 men and tn 3-pounder guns. She was under Jean-Augustin Huret from late 1799 with 34 men. Damaged in combat on 20 March 1800.) (Note: Rusé was a 70-ton privateer lugger from Boulogne, built to specifications from Jacques-Oudart "Bucaille" Fourmentin. First cruise from November 1796 to February 1797 under Bucaille, with 75 men and 10 guns (two 12-pounders and ten 3 or 4-pounders). Another cruise from Dunkirk from November to December 1797 under Bucaille with 8 guns. She made two further in 1798 and 1799 under Pierre Audibert, until HMS Kite captured Rusé on 18 May 1799.)

In 1799 a court martial honourably acquitted Growler's master of her loss.

French Navy: The French Navy purchased Growler in November 1798 and retained her name.

Recapture: The British found Growler in a very decayed state on 1 August 1809 at Veere on the island of Walcheren at the beginning of the Walcheren Campaign.
