= Commerce (1797 ship) =

History

Great Britain
- Name: Commerce
- Builder: Teignmouth
- Launched: 1797
- Captured: January 1800

General characteristics
- Tons burthen: 184 (bm)
- Sail plan: Brig

Commerce was launched at Teignmouth in 1797. She was captured in 1799 while sailing from London to Oporto, recaptured, and captured again in 1800.

She first appeared in Lloyd's Register (LR) in 1799 with Bibbins, master, Brine & Co., owners, and trade London-Lisbon.

In December 1799 near Oporto a privateer captured Commerce, which was carrying a cargo of salt fish from Newfoundland to Oporto. On 27 December HMS Netley recaptured Commerce.

On 8 January 1800 Netley had to leave Commerce behind near the shore. Commerce had no usable sails, and the wind forced Netley to sail away from the shore. Commerce, Bibbins, master, was again captured. This time her captor sent her into Vigo.

The entry for Commerce in the Register of Shipping for 1800 carried the annotation "Captured".
