= HMS Steady (1797) =

British Royal Navy vessel

History

Great Britain
- Name: HMS Steady (ex-GB No. 19)
- Ordered: 7 February 1797
- Builder: Hill & Mellish, Limehouse
- Laid down: February 1797
- Launched: 24 April 1797
- Commissioned: May 1797
- Renamed: HMS Oroonoko (7 February 1805)
- Fate: Sold in September 1802

General characteristics
- Class & type: Courser-class gun-brig
- Tons burthen: 16829/94 (bm)
- Length: 76 ft 1 in (23.19 m) (gundeck); 62 ft 3 1/4 in (18.980 m) (keel)
- Beam: 22 ft 6 1/2 in (6.871 m)
- Depth of hold: 8 ft 3 in (2.51 m)
- Sail plan: Brig
- Complement: 50
- Armament: 10 × 18-pounder carronades; 2 × 24-pounder guns as chasers

Launched on 24 April 1797, the gunboat GB No. 19 was reclassed as a gun-brig and renamed HMS Steady on 7 August the same year. She was a 12-gun Courser-class gun-brig built for the British Royal Navy at Limehouse. She sailed to the West Indies in early 1800. She was paid off in February 1803 but then recalled to service in 1805 as HMS Oronooko, a temporary prison ship at Trinidad. The Navy sold her at Barbados in 1806.

== Design and construction ==
The Courser class was designed by Sir William Rule, the Surveyor of the Navy and although at first intended as gunboats, and therefore only had numbers, on 7 August 1797 they were reclassified as gun-brigs, and were given names. The class were fitted with a Schank sliding keel and armed with ten 18-pounder carronades and two long 24-pounders.

== Career ==
Lieutenant Joseph Wood commissioned Steady in May 1797 for the Downs. By 1799 Lieutenant Charles Clovell was captain of Steady. In October she underwent coppering at Sheerness. In April 1800 she sailed to the West Indies. She was paid off in February 1803, during the Peace of Amiens.

She returned to service and was named HMS Oroonoko on 7 February 1805; she then served as a temporary prison ship at Trinidad. The Navy sold her at Barbados in 1806. HMS Oroonoko replaced her in the prison ship role.
