= HMS Blazer (1797) =

Gunvessel of the Royal Navy

History

Great Britain
- Name: GB No.12
- Ordered: 7 February 1797
- Builder: John Dudman & Co., Deptford
- Laid down: February 1797
- Launched: 14 April 1797
- Commissioned: July 1797
- Renamed: HMS Blazer
- Fate: Sold 1803

General characteristics
- Class & type: Acute-class gunbrig
- Tons burthen: 1613/94 (bm)
- Length: Overall: 75 ft 1 in (22.9 m); Keel: 61 ft 7 3/8 in (18.8 m)
- Beam: 22 ft 2 in (6.8 m)
- Depth of hold: 8 ft 0 in (2.4 m)
- Complement: 50
- Armament: 12 × 18-pounder carronades + 2 × 24-pounder bow chasers

HMS Blazer was an Acute-class gunbrig (ex-GB No.12), of the British Royal Navy, launched in 1797. In 1801 she grounded on the coast of Sweden and the Swedes took possession; they restored her to Britain in May. She was sold in 1803.

== Career ==
Lieutenant Daniel Burgess commissioned Blazer in July 1797. She participated in Ostend operations in May 1798.

On 14 December 1798, Blazer was at Harwich and under the command of Lieutenant Elliott. Peters, of Hamburg, Peter Lansen, master, put into Harwich in distress. Peters, of 220 tons burthen, had lost her cables and anchors. Elliott sent over a boat under the charge of Blazer's sailing master, Mr. Applebie to press her crew. Her crew had not destroyed her papers and Applebie discovered that she was carrying linens, arms, and gunflints to France. She had a crew of 44 and her cargo was valued at £45,000.

Lieutenant Jonah Tiller commanded Blazer in the Baltic in 1799–1800.

Blazer sailed with the fleet that would attack Copenhagen in 1801. The fleet assembled in the Kattegat in March 1801 but on 22 March a storm came up that dispersed some of the vessels. Blazer was driven under the guns of Varberg Fortress where the Swedes captured her; they restored her to the British in May 1801.

== Fate ==
The "Principal Officers and Commissioners of his Majesty's Navy" first offered "Blazer Gun-Vessel, 161 Tons, lying at Sheerness" for sale on 1 December 1802. She sold in January 1803.
