= List of gun-brigs of the Royal Navy =

A gun-brig was a small brig-rigged warship that enjoyed popularity in the Royal Navy during the Napoleonic Wars, during which large numbers were purchased or built. In general these were vessels of under 200 tons burthen, and thus smaller than the more common Cherokee-class brig-sloops or the even larger Cruizer-class brig-sloops. The gun-brigs generally carried 12 guns, comprising two long guns in the chase position and ten carronades on the broadsides.

For brig-rigged sloops, see List of corvette and sloop classes of the Royal Navy. For gunboats, see List of gunboat and gunvessel classes of the Royal Navy.

== Development ==
The earliest gun-brigs were shallow-draught vessels. Initially they were not brigs at all, but were classed as 'gunvessels' and carried a schooner or brigantine rig. They were re-rigged as brigs about 1796 and re-classed under the new term 'gun-brig'. They were designed as much to row as to sail, and carried their primary armament firing forward - a pair of long 18-pounders or 24-pounders, weapons which in any practical sense could only be trained and fired with the vessel under oars.

The 1797 batch introduced means to improve their sailing ability. Each was fitted with a Schank drop keel, (Note: The Schank keel was invented by Captain (later Admiral) John Schank, and was known at the time as a "sliding keel". It was effectively a centreboard or daggerboard that the crew could raise to allow operations in shallow water under oars, or when sailing before the wind. In deeper water they could drop it to make the vessel weatherly when sailing to windward.) and lighter bow chasers replaced the heavy pair of guns firing forward over the bows; in later vessels one of the bow chasers would be moved aft to become a stern chaser, both of these guns then being mounted on the centreline and able to pivot. The broadside weapons consisted of 18-pounder carronades mounted on slides along both sides.

The later gun-brigs developed from this beginning into smaller versions of the brig-sloops with increased draught and seaworthiness, but were less suited for inshore warfare. Compared with the flat-bottomed hulls of the 1794-1800 designs, by the time of the Confounder class the hulls had achieved a relatively sharp cross-section, as performance under sail had become a more important consideration than ease of rowing. By now they were clearly seen as small versions of the brig-sloop rather than enlarged gunboats.

== Deployment ==
The early gun-brigs were seen as inshore and coastal vessels, and saw their first service in coastal operations, notably in the Channel, where they sought out French coastal shipping. As their numbers grew and more seaworthy designs emerged, they were deployed worldwide, notably in the Baltic where many were involved in confrontations with the myriad of Danish gunboats during the Gunboat War, but also on such distant stations as the East Indies.

== Complement ==
The purpose-built gun-brigs were all established with a complement of 50 men, and maintained this level throughout their main period of operation, although the actual number carried varied with availability. The final batch saw the complement raised to 60. Each gun-brig had a lieutenant in command (unlike brig-sloops, which were under commanders), and while he was the only commissioned officer aboard, he was assisted by a midshipman and a number of warrant officers - a master's mate (ranked as 'master and pilot') to share the watches, carpenter's mate, gunner's mate, boatswain's mate and surgeon's mate. Other petty officers included a ropemaker, sailmaker, clerk, quartermaster and quartermaster's mate. There were fifteen marines on board - a sergeant to command, a corporal, and thirteen privates. The rest of the crew were ranked as seamen - able seamen, ordinary seamen or landsmen.

== Historical evaluation ==
The naval historian and novelist C. S. Forester commented in relation to the gun-brigs that:

The type was a necessary one but represented the inevitable unsatisfactory compromise when a vessel has to be designed to fight, to be seaworthy and to have a long endurance, all on a minimum displacement and at minimum expense. Few men in the Royal Navy had a good word to say for the gun-brigs, which rolled terribly and were greatly over-crowded, but they had to be employed.

— C. S. Forester

In this criticism of the gun-brig, Forester was perhaps being a little unfair; the class had been designed largely as convoy escorts for coastal operations and it is little wonder they rolled heavily in the open sea. They performed sterling service in a wide range of conditions not envisaged by their designers, making them analogous in this respect to the Flower-class corvette of World War II; cheap, uncomfortable, over-crowded, and lightly armed but completely essential.

== List of gun-brig classes and their evolution ==
The following sub-sections describe the sequence of the gun-brigs built to individual designs from the earliest acquisitions of 1793 until the last gun-brigs joined the Navy in 1813.

=== 1793 purchases ===
Three vessels of about 140 tons each were purchased in 1793, and armed with two 18-pounder long guns and ten 18-pounder carronades. They were numbered (not named) GB No. 1, GB No. 2 and GB No. 3. (Note: The letters "GB" were never stated to be an abbreviation for "gunboat". Certainly by 1797 the term "gun-brig" was used, and the letters "GB" more likely represented that title, but still the letters were not explicitly an abbreviation.) No further details were recorded, but their existence probably explains why the initial numbering of the Acute class below (prior to their being given names) began with GB No. 4.

=== Conquest class ===
Class overview
- Name: Conquest-class gun-brig
- Operators: Royal Navy
- In service: 1794–1817
- Completed: 12

General characteristics
- Type: Gun-brig
- Tons burthen: 146 41/94bm
- Length: 75 ft (23 m) (gundeck); 62 ft 3 1/8 in (18.977 m) (keel)
- Beam: 21 ft (6.4 m)
- Depth of hold: 7 ft (2.1 m)
- Sail plan: Brig
- Complement: 50
- Armament: 2 × 24-pounder bow guns; 10 × 18-pounder carronades

The first batch of twelve gun-brigs were all built by contract to a design by Surveyor of the Navy Sir John Henslow, and ordered on 6 March 1794; they were all named and registered on 26 May. They were designed to be rowed (with 18 oars) as well as sailed, for which purpose they carried a brig rig, though it was originally planned to rig them as schooners or brigantines. The initial plan was that they would mount a main armament of 4-pounder long guns, but this was rapidly substituted by a broadside battery of ten 18-pounder carronades, with two 24-pounders as chase guns in the bow and two 4-pounders as chase guns in the stern. The 4-pounders were soon deleted, making them all 12-gun vessels.

From March 1795 all twelve of the class were attached to the Inshore Squadron commanded by Captain Sir Sidney Smith.

Name	Ordered	Builder	Launched	Fate
Aimwell	6 March 1794	Perry & Hankey, Blackwall	12 May 1794	Broken up November 1811
Pelter	6 March 1794	Perry & Hankey, Blackwall	12 May 1794	Sold October 1802
Borer	6 March 1794	Randall & Co., Rotherhithe	17 May 1794	Sold 1810
Plumper	6 March 1794	Randall & Co, Rotherhithe	17 May 1794	Sold January 1802
Teazer	6 March 1794	John Dudman & Co, Deptford	26 May 1794	Sold October 1802
Tickler	6 March 1794	Hill & Mellish, Limehouse	28 May 1794	Sold May 1802
Swinger	6 March 1794	Hill & Mellish, Limehouse	31 May 1794	Sold October 1802
Force	6 March 1794	Thomas Pitcher, Northfleet	May 1794	Sold October 1802
Piercer	6 March 1794	Thomas King, Dover	2 June 1794	Sold June 1802
Attack	6 March 1794	John Wilson & Co, Frindsbury	28 June 1794	Sold September 1802
Fearless	6 March 1794	William Cleverley, Gravesend	June 1794	Wrecked 20 January 1804
Conquest	6 March 1794	Josiah & Thomas Brindley, Frindsbury	29? July 1794	Sold April 1817

=== Acute class ===
Class overview
- Name: Acute-class gun-brig
- Operators: Royal Navy
- In service: 1797–1805
- Completed: 15

General characteristics
- Type: Gun-brig
- Tons burthen: 15863/94 bm
- Length: 75 ft (23 m) (gundeck); 61 ft 7 5/8 in (18.786 m) (keel)
- Beam: 22 ft (6.7 m)
- Depth of hold: 7 ft 11 in (2.41 m)
- Sail plan: Brig
- Complement: 50
- Armament: 2 × 24-pounder bow guns; 10 × 18-pounder carronades

A further design by John Henslow, to which fifteen vessels were ordered on 7 February 1797. In this design, the breadth was increased by a foot from the Conquest class, and the depth of the hold was increased by eleven inches. All were brig-rigged and received Schank sliding or drop keels.

Initially these were intended to be classed as gunboats, and were given numbers (nos. GB No. 4 to GB No. 18) rather than names, but on 7 August they were re-classed as gunbrigs and given names. They carried the same armament as their predecessors.

Name	Ordered	Builder	Launched	Fate
Assault (ex GB No. 4)	7 February 1797	John Randall, Rotherhithe	10 April 1797	Sold June 1827
Asp (ex GB No. 5)	7 February 1797	John Randall, Rotherhithe	10 April 1797	Sold July? 1803
Acute (ex GB No. 6)	7 February 1797	John Randall, Rotherhithe	April 1797	Sold October 1802
Sparkler (ex GB No. 7)	7 February 1797	John Randall, Deptford	April 1797	Sold September 1802
Bouncer (ex GB No. 8)	7 February 1797	John & William Wells, Deptford	11? April 1797	Sold April 1802
Boxer (ex GB No. 9)	7 February 1797	John & William Wells, Deptford	11 April 1797	Sold July 1809
Biter (ex GB No. 10)	7 February 1797	John & William Wells, Deptford	13 March 1797	Sold May 1802
Bruiser (ex GB No. 11)	7 February 1797	John & William Wells, Deptford	11 April 1797	Sold January 1802
Blazer (ex GB No. 12)	7 February 1797	John Dudman & Co, Deptford	14 April 1797	Sold January 1803
Cracker (ex GB No. 13)	7 February 1797	John Dudman & Co, Deptford	25 April 1797	Sold December 1802
Clinker (ex GB No. 14)	7 February 1797	John Dudman & Co, Deptford	28 April 1797	Sold October 1802
Crash (ex GB No. 15)	7 February 1797	Mrs Frances Barnard & Co, Deptford	5 April 1797	Sold September 1802
Contest (ex GB No. 16)	7 February 1797	Mrs Frances Barnard & Co, Deptford	11 April 1797	Wrecked 29 August 1799
Adder (ex GB No. 17)	7 February 1797	Mrs Frances Barnard & Co, Deptford	22 April 1797	Broken up February 1805
Spiteful (ex GB No. 18)	7 February 1797	Mrs Frances Barnard & Co, Deptford	24 April 1797	Broken up July 1823

=== Courser class ===
Class overview
- Name: Courser-class gun-brig
- Operators: Royal Navy
- In service: 1797–1803
- Completed: 15

General characteristics
- Type: Gun-brig
- Tons burthen: 16750/94 bm
- Length: 76 ft (23 m) (gundeck); 62 ft 2 5/8 in (18.964 m) (keel)
- Beam: 22 ft 6 in (6.86 m)
- Depth of hold: 8 ft 3 in (2.51 m)
- Sail plan: Brig
- Complement: 50
- Armament: 2 × 24-pounder bow guns; 10 × 18-pounder carronades

At the same time as John Henslow was designing the Acute class, his colleague, fellow-Surveyor Sir William Rule, was ordered to produce an alternative design. Rule's design too incorporated a Schank drop or sliding keel.

Fifteen vessels to this design - the Courser class - were ordered at the same time as those to the Acute class. A sixteenth unit was added to the order a month later. Originally numbered GB No. 19 to GB No. 33, plus GB No. 45, the following sixteen vessels were all given names on 7 August 1797.

Name	Ordered	Builder	Launched	Fate
Steady (ex GB No. 19)	7 February 1797	Hill & Mellish, Limehouse	24 April 1797	Renamed Oroonoko in 1805; sold 1806
Courser (ex GB No. 20)	7 February 1797	Hill & Mellish, Limehouse	25 April 1797	Sold (probably to HM Customs) August 1803
Defender (ex GB No. 21)	7 February 1797	Hill & Mellish, Limehouse	21 May 1797	Sold September 1802
Eclipse (ex GB No. 22)	7 February 1797	Perry & Co, Blackwall	29 March 1797	Sold September 1802
Furious (ex GB No. 23)	7 February 1797	Perry & Co, Blackwall	31 March 1797	Sold October 1802
Flamer (ex GB No. 24)	7 February 1797	Perry & Co, Blackwall	30 March 1797	Sold April 1802
Furnace (ex GB No. 25)	7 February 1797	Perry & Co, Blackwall	10 April 1797	Sold October 1802
Growler (ex GB No. 26)	7 February 1797	Thomas Pitcher, Northfleet	10 April 1797	Captured by French privateers 21 December 1797
Griper (ex GB No. 27)	7 February 1797	Thomas Pitcher, Northfleet	10 April 1797	Sold October 1802
Grappler (ex GB No. 28)	7 February 1797	Thomas Pitcher, Northfleet	April 1797	Wrecked on Chausey Islands 30 December 1803
Gallant (ex GB No. 29)	7 February 1797	Thomas Pitcher, Northfleet	April 1797	Sold October 1802
Hardy (ex GB No. 30)	7 February 1797	William Cleverley, Gravesend	10 April 1797	Sold May 1802
Haughty (ex GB No. 31)	7 February 1797	William Cleverley, Gravesend	April 1797	Sold May 1802
Hecate (ex GB No. 32)	7 February 1797	John Wilson & Co, Frindsbury	2 May 1797	Sunk as breakwater 1809
Hasty (ex GB No. 33)	7 February 1797	John Wilson & Co, Frindsbury	June 1797	Sold December 1802
Tigress (ex GB No. 45)	March 1797	Josiah & Thomas Brindley, King's Lynn	11 September 1797	Sold January 1802

=== 1797 purchases ===
The first ten of these small mercantile brigs were all purchased at Leith and fitted there for naval service, being registered on the Navy List on 5 April 1797. An eleventh vessel (Staunch) was purchased in frame in Kent and registered on 15 April 1797. These assorted vessels did not constitute a single class, but as procured as a group they are here treated similarly. Originally numbered GB No. 34 to GB No. 44, the following eleven vessels were all given names on 7 August 1797.

Name	Purchased	Former mercantile name	Fate
Meteor (ex GB No. 34)	March 1797	Lady Cathcart	Sold February 1802
Mastiff (ex GB No. 35)	March 1797	Herald	Wrecked 5 January 1800
Minx (ex GB No. 36)	March 1797	Tom	Sold January 1801
Manly (ex GB No. 37)	April 1797	Experiment	Sold December 1802
Pouncer (ex GB No. 38)	March 1797	David	Sold September 1802
Pincher (ex GB No. 39)	March 1797	Two Sisters	Sold April 1802
Wrangler (ex GB No. 40)	March 1797	Fortune	Sold December 1802
Rattler (ex GB No. 41)	March 1797	Hope	Sold May 1802
Ready (ex GB No. 42)	March 1797	Minerva	Sold December 1802
Safeguard (ex GB No. 43)	March 1797	unknown	Sold September 1802
Staunch (ex GB No. 44)	March 1797	none	Sold late 1803

=== 1799 purchase ===
Built in 1798 as a cutter, and re-rigged by the Navy as a brig, this was a very small vessel of only 60 tons, established with just 18 men and six 3-pounder guns. One should perhaps consider this vessel in practice simply as a gunboat, although she was rated as a gun-brig. In 1825 Malay pirates captured her and massacred her entire crew before wrecking her on Babar Island in the southern Moluccas.

Name	Purchased	Former mercantile name	Fate
Lady Nelson	1799	Lady Nelson	Wrecked February 1825

=== Archer class (1801 batch) ===
Class overview
- Name: Archer-class gun-brig
- Operators: Royal Navy
- In service: 1801–1815
- Completed: 10 (in 1801 batch)

General characteristics
- Type: Gun-brig
- Tons burthen: 17731/94 bm
- Length: 80 ft (24 m) (gundeck); 65 ft 10 1/4 in (20.072 m) (keel)
- Beam: 22 ft 6 in (6.86 m)
- Depth of hold: 9 ft 5 in (2.87 m)
- Sail plan: Brig
- Complement: 50
- Armament: 2 × 18- or 32-pounder bow carronades + 10 × 18-pounder carronades

As in 1797, the two Surveyors were asked to produce alternative designs for the next batch of gun-brigs, which were lengthened by five feet from the previous classes. Ten vessels were ordered at the close of 1800 to Sir William Rule's design. One, Charger, received an 8-inch brass mortar in 1809.

Name	Ordered	Builder	Launched	Fate
Aggressor	30 December 1800	Wells & Co, Blackwall	1 April 1801	Sold 23 November 1815
Archer	30 December 1800	Wells & Co, Blackwall	2 April 1801	Sold 14 December 1815
Bold	30 December 1800	Wells & Co, Blackwall	16 April 1801	Broken up April 1811
Conflict	30 December 1800	John Dudman & Co, Deptford	17 April 1801	Captured by the French 24 October 1804
Charger	30 December 1800	John Dudman & Co, Deptford	17 April 1801	Sold 9 June 1814
Constant	30 December 1800	John Dudman & Co, Deptford	28 April 1801	Sold 15 February 1816
Locust	30 December 1800	Mrs Frances Barnard Sons & Co, Deptford	2 April 1801	Sold 11 August 1814
Mallard	30 December 1800	Mrs Frances Barnard Sons & Co, Deptford	11 April 1801	Captured by the French 24 December 1804
Mariner	30 December 1800	Thomas Pitcher, Northfleet	4 April 1801	Sold 29 September 1814
Minx	30 December 1800	Thomas Pitcher, Northfleet	14 April 1801	Captured by the Danes 2 September 1809

=== Bloodhound class ===
Class overview
- Name: Bloodhound-class gun-brig
- Operators: Royal Navy
- In service: 1801–1815
- Completed: 10
- Lost: 4

General characteristics
- Type: Gun-brig
- Tons burthen: 18439/94 (bm)
- Length: 80 ft (24 m) (gundeck); 65 ft 6 1/2 in (19.977 m) (keel)
- Beam: 23 ft (7.0 m)
- Depth of hold: 8 ft 6 in (2.59 m)
- Sail plan: Brig
- Complement: 50
- Armament: 2 × 18- or 32-pounder bow carronades + 10 × 18-pounder carronades

Sir John Henslow produced his equivalent design to that of Rule's Archer batch, and ten vessels were ordered to this design just nine days after those of his colleague's design.

Name	Ordered	Builder	Launched	Fate
Escort	7 January 1801	Perry, Wells & Green, Blackwall	1 April 1801	Sold to HM Customs August 1815
Jackall	7 January 1801	Perry, Wells & Green, Blackwall	1 April 1801	Wrecked 30 May 1807
Bloodhound	7 January 1801	John Randall & Co, Rotherhithe	2 April 1801	Sold 18 September 1816
Basilisk	7 January 1801	John Randall & Co, Rotherhithe	2 April 1801	Sold 14 December 1815
Censor	7 January 1801	John Randall & Co, Rotherhithe	2 April 1801	Sold 11 January 1816
Ferreter	7 January 1801	Perry, Wells & Green, Blackwall	4 April 1801	Captured by the Dutch 31 March 1807
Starling	7 January 1801	Balthazar & Edward Adams, Bucklers Hard	4 April 1801	Destroyed in action 24 December 1804
Snipe	7 January 1801	Balthazar & Edward Adams, Bucklers Hard	2 May 1801	Broken up May 1846
Vixen	7 January 1801	Balthazar & Edward Adams, Bucklers Hard	9 June 1801	Sold 28 March 1815
Monkey	7 January 1801	John Nicholson, Rochester	11 May 1801	Wrecked 25 December 1810

=== 1793–1801 ex-French prizes ===
During the French Revolutionary War, some twenty-one similar vessels were captured from the French (both naval vessels and privateers) and commissioned in the Royal Navy as gun-brigs. These assorted vessels did not constitute a single class, but as all were procured from the enemy during the French Revolutionary War they are here treated similarly.

- Espiegle
- Actif
- Requin
- Dixmunde
- Nieuport
- Ostend
- Resolue
- Lacedemonian
- Athenienne
- Venom
- Transfer
- Deux Amis
- Halifax
- Fortune
- Aventurier
- Anacreon
- Marianne, of 12 guns, captured by Tigre on 1 March 1799, recaptured by the French, recaptured by the British in November 1799 and sold September 1801 at the end of the campaign in Egypt.

==== Captured together ====
Commodore Sir Sidney Smith in Tigre took a flotilla of seven vessels at Acre on 18 March 1799. The British took them into service.

- Negresse;
- Foudre;
- Dangereuse;
- Marie-Rose
- Vierge-de-Grâce
- Deux Freres;
- Torride.

=== 1801 ex-Spanish prize ===
- Guachapin

=== 1796–1800 ex-Dutch prizes ===
During the French Revolutionary War, two similar vessels were captured from the Dutch and commissioned in the Royal Navy as gun-brigs. These vessels did not constitute a single class, but as both were procured from the enemy during the French Revolutionary War they are here treated similarly.

- Amboyna
- Mongoose

=== Archer class (1804 batch) ===
Class overview
- Name: Archer-class gun-brig
- Operators: Royal Navy
- In service: 1804–post 1815
- Completed: 48 (in 1804 batch)
- Lost: 20

General characteristics
- Type: Gun-brig
- Tons burthen: 17731/94bm
- Length: 80 ft (24 m) (gundeck); 65 ft 10 1/4 in (20.072 m) (keel)
- Beam: 22 ft 6 in (6.86 m)
- Depth of hold: 9 ft 5 in (2.87 m)
- Sail plan: Brig
- Complement: 50
- Armament: 2 × chase guns (varying calibres) + 10 × 18-pounder carronades

Most of the early gun-brigs were sold or broken up during the short-lived Peace of Amiens. Consequently, in the first half of 1804, the Admiralty ordered a further batch of forty-seven gun-brigs to the 1800 William Rule design - 25 on 9 January, seven on 22 March and 15 during June - with an additional one ordered from Halifax Dockard, Nova Scotia on 1 October. Many reused the names of gun-brigs that had been disposed of or lost before 1804.

Name	Ordered	Builder	Launched	Fate
Bruiser	9 January 1804	Thomas Pitcher, Northfleet	28 April 1804	Sold 24 February 1815
Blazer	9 January 1804	Thomas Pitcher, Northfleet	3 May 1804	Sold 15 December 1814
Cracker	9 January 1804	Thomas Pitcher, Northfleet	30 June 1804	Sold 21 November 1815
Haughty	9 January 1804	John Dudman & Co, Deptford	7 May 1804	Sold 11 January 1816
Wrangler	9 January 1804	John Dudman & Co, Deptford	28 May 1804	Sold 14 December 1815
Manly	9 January 1804	John Dudman & Co, Deptford	7 May 1804	Sold 11 August 1814
Pelter	9 January 1804	John Dudman & Co, Deptford	25 July 1804	Presumed to have foundered March 1809
Plumper (i)	9 January 1804	John Dudman & Co, Deptford	7 September 1804	Captured by the French 16 July 1805
Flamer	9 January 1804	Josiah & Thomas Brindley, Frindsbury	8 May 1804	Sold 16 September 1858
Firm	9 January 1804	Josiah & Thomas Brindley, Frindsbury	2 July 1804	Wrecked 29 June 1811
Furious	9 January 1804	Josiah & Thomas Brindley, Frindsbury	21 July 1804	Sold 9 February 1815
Griper	9 January 1804	Josiah & Thomas Brindley, Frindsbury	24 September 1804	Wrecked 18 February 1807
Contest	9 January 1804	William Courtney, Chester	June 1804	Presumed to have foundered December 1809
Defender	9 January 1804	William Courtney, Chester	28 July 1804	Wrecked 14 December 1809
Steady	9 January 1804	Richards & Davidson, Chester	21 July 1804	Sold 9 February 1815
Biter	9 January 1804	William Wallis, Blackwall	27 July 1804	Wrecked 10 November 1805
Safeguard	9 January 1804	Robert Davy, Topsham, Exeter	4 August 1804	Captured by the Danes 29 June 1811
Swinger	9 January 1804	Robert Davy, Topsham, Exeter	September 1804	Broken up June 1812
Acute	9 January 1804	Robert Adams, Chapel, Southampton	21 July 1804	Broken up 1864?
Attack	9 January 1804	Robert Adams, Chapel, Southampton	9 August 1804	Captured by the Danes 19 August 1812
Piercer	9 January 1804	Obadiah Ayles, Topsham, Exeter	29 July 1804	Transferred to Government of Hanover June 1814
Growler	9 January 1804	Balthazar & Edward Adams, Bucklers Hard	10 August 1804	Sold 31 August 1815
Bouncer	9 January 1804	William Rowe, Newcastle	11 August 1804	Captured by the French February 1805
Staunch	9 January 1804	Benjamin Tanner, Dartmouth	21 August 1804	Presumed foundered June 1811
Pincher	9 January 1804	Joseph Graham, Harwich	28 August 1804	Sold 17 May 1816
Clinker	22 March 1804	Thomas Pitcher, Northfleet	30 June 1804	Presumed foundered December 1806
Tigress	22 March 1804	John Dudman & Co, Deptford	1 June 1804	Captured by the Danes 2 August 1808
Teazer	22 March 1804	John Dudman & Co, Deptford	16 July 1804	Sold 3 August 1815
Sparkler	22 March 1804	Matthew Warren, Brightlingsea	6 August 1804	Wrecked 13 January 1808
Tickler	22 March 1804	Matthew Warren, Brightlingsea	8 August 1804	Captured by the Danes 4 June 1808
Hardy	22 March 1804	R. B. Roxby, Wearmouth	7 August 1804	Sold 6 August 1835
Gallant	22 March 1804	R. B. Roxby, Wearmouth	20 September 1804	Sold 14 December 1815
Attentive	June 1804	Bools & Good, Bridport	18 September 1804	Broken up August 1812
Cheerly	June 1804	Bools & Good, Bridport	October 1804	Sold 9 February 1815
Daring	June 1804	Jabez Bayley, Ipswich	October 1804	Destroyed to prevent capture 27 January 1813
Rapid	June 1804	Robert Davy, Topsham, Exeter	20 October 1804	Destroyed in action 18 May 1808
Urgent	June 1804	John Bass, Lympstone	2 November 1804	Sold 31 July 1816
Fervent	June 1804	Balthazar & Edward Adams, Bucklers Hard	15 December 1804	Broken up 1879
Fearless	June 1804	Joseph Graham, Harwich	18 December 1804	Wrecked 8 December 1812
Forward	June 1804	Joseph Todd, Berwick	4 January 1805	Sold 14 December 1815
Desperate	June 1804	Thomas White, Broadstairs	2 January 1805	Sold 15 December 1814
Earnest	June 1804	Menzies & Goalen, Leith	January 1805	Sold 2 May 1816
Woodlark	June 1804	Menzies & Goalen, Leith	January 1805	Wrecked 13 November 1805
Protector	June 1804	Matthew Warren, Brightlingsea	1 February 1805	Sold 30 August 1833
Sharpshooter	June 1804	Matthew Warren, Brightlingsea	2 February 1805	Sold 17 May 1816
Dexterous	June 1804	Balthazar & Edward Adams, Bucklers Hard	2 February 1805	Sold 17 October 1816
Redbreast	June 1804	John Preston, Great Yarmouth	27 April 1805	Sold 14 June 1850
Plumper (ii)	1 October 1804	Halifax Dockyard, Nova Scotia	29 December 1807	Wrecked 5 December 1812

=== 1804 purchases ===
These four assorted vessels purchased in June 1804 did not constitute a single class, but as procured as a group they are here treated similarly.

Name	Purchased	Builder	Launched	Fate
Watchful (ex mercantile Jane)	June 1804	Norfolk	1795	Sold 3 November 1814
Thrasher (ex mercantile Adamant)	June 1804	Matthew Warren, Brightlingsea	1804	Sold 3 November 1814
Sentinel (ex mercantile Friendship)	June 1804	"Little Yarmouth"	1800	Wrecked 10 October 1812
Volunteer (ex mercantile Harmony)	June 1804	Whitby	1804	Sold June 1812

=== Confounder class ===
Class overview
- Name: Confounder-class gun-brig
- Operators: Royal Navy
- In service: 1804–post 1815
- Completed: 21

General characteristics
- Type: Gun-brig
- Tons burthen: 179 48/94 bm
- Length: 84 ft (26 m) (gundeck); 69 ft 8 3/4 in (21.253 m) (keel)
- Beam: 22 ft (6.7 m)
- Depth of hold: 11 ft (3.4 m)
- Sail plan: Brig
- Complement: 50
- Armament: 2 × 12-pounder chase guns, on traversing carriages, one in the bow and one in the stern; on some vessels 6- or 9-pounder guns replaced the 12-pounder guns; 10 × 18-pounder carronades

The Confounder-class vessels were built to an 1804 design by William Rule. The design reflected learning from the experiences of the earlier gunbrig classes. As a result, the Confounder-class vessels were more "sea-kindly" and better able to handle long voyages. Two vessels were converted to mortar brigs in 1809.

Name	Ordered	Builder	Launched	Fate
Confounder	20 November 1804	Robert Adams, Chapel, Southampton	April 1805	Sold 9 June 1814
Hearty	20 November 1804	Jabez Bayley, Ipswich	12 April 1805	Sold 11 July 1816
Martial	20 November 1804	Charles Ross, Rochester	17 April 1805	Sold 21 January 1836
Resolute	20 November 1804	John King, Dover	17 April 1805	Broken up 1852
Exertion	20 November 1804	John Preston, Great Yarmouth	2 May 1805	Destroyed in action 9 July 1812
Indignant	20 November 1804	Bools & Good, Bridport	13 May 1805	Broken up June 1811
Encounter	20 November 1804	Robert Guillaume, Northam, Southampton	16 May 1805	Captured by the French 11 July 1812
Rebuff	20 November 1804	Richards & Davidson, Hythe	30 May 1805	Sold 15 December 1814
Starling	20 November 1804	William Rowe, Newcastle	May 1805	Sold 29 September 1814
Inveterate	20 November 1804	Bools & Good, Bridport	30 May 1805	Wrecked 18 February 1807
Intelligent	20 November 1804	Bools & Good, Bridport	26 August 1805	Became a mooring lighter 1816 - final fate unknown
Dapper	20 November 1804	Robert Adams, Chapel, Southampton	December 1805	Sold 29 September 1814
Fancy	20 November 1804	John Preston, Great Yarmouth	7 January 1806	Foundered 24 December 1811
Conflict	20 November 1804	Robert Davy, Topsham, Exeter	14 May 1805	Sold 29 September 1814
Strenuous	20 November 1804	William Rowe, Newcastle	16 May 1805	Sold 1 September 1814
Turbulent	20 November 1804	Benjamin Tanner, Dartmouth	17 July 1805	Captured by the Danes 9 June 1808
Havock	20 November 1804	Stone, Great Yarmouth	25 July 1805	Broken up 25 June 1859
Virago	20 November 1804	Benjamin Tanner, Dartmouth	23 September 1805	Sold 30 May 1816
Bustler	20 November 1804	Obadiah Ayles, Topsham, Exeter	12 August 1805	Captured by the French 26 December 1808
Adder	20 November 1804	Obadiah Ayles, Topsham, Exeter	9 November 1805	Wrecked 9 December 1806
Richmond	23 August 1805	Greensword & Kidwell, Itchenor	February 1806	Sold 29 September 1814

=== 1806 purchases ===
These two vessels were the former Revenue cutters Speedwell and Ranger respectively. These two assorted vessels did not constitute a single class, but as procured from the same source they are here treated similarly.

Name	Purchased	Builder	Launched	Fate
Linnet	1806	Cowes	1797	Captured by French Navy 25 February 1813
Pigmy	1806 (while building)	John Avery, Dartmouth	June 1806	Wrecked 2 March 1807

=== Bold (or modified Confounder) class ===
Class overview
- Name: Bold-class gun-brig
- Operators: Royal Navy
- In service: 1812–post 1815
- Completed: 18

General characteristics
- Type: Gun-brig
- Tons burthen: 17947/94 bm
- Length: 84 ft (25.6 m) (gundeck); 69 ft 8 3/4 in (21.3 m) (keel)
- Beam: 22 ft (6.7 m)
- Depth of hold: 11 ft 1 in (3.4 m)
- Sail plan: Brig
- Complement: 60
- Armament: 2 × 6-pounder bow guns; 10 × 18-pounder carronades

A revival of Sir William Rule's Confounder class of 1804, this final group was built to a somewhat modified version of that design, and were commonly referred to as the Bold class. Twelve were ordered in November 1811, and a further batch of six followed in November 1812. Unlike earlier brigs of this size, most were re-rated as brig-sloops at or soon after their completion, and were under commanders (rather than lieutenants), at least until 1815–17, when they reverted to being gun-brigs.

Name	Ordered	Builder	Launched	Fate
Bold	16 November 1811	Tyson & Blake, Bursledon	26 June 1812	Wrecked 27 September 1813
Manly	16 November 1811	Thomas Hills, Sandwich	13 July 1812	Sold 12 December 1833
Snap	16 November 1811	Russell & Son, Lyme Regis	25 July 1812	Sold 4 January 1832
Thistle	16 November 1811	Mrs Mary Ross, Rochester	13 July 1812	Broken up July 1823
Boxer	16 November 1811	Hobbs & Hellyer, Redbridge, Southampton	25 July 1812	Captured by US Navy 9 September 1813
Borer	16 November 1811	Tyson & Blake, Bursledon	27 July 1812	Sold 12 October 1815
Shamrock	16 November 1811	Edward Larking, King's Lynn	8 August 1812	Sale notified 24 January 1867
Hasty	16 November 1811	Thomas Hills, Sandwich	26 August 1812	Became dredger at Mauritius 1826–7
Conflict	16 November 1811	William Good, Bridport	26 September 1812	Sold 30 December 1840
Contest	16 November 1811	William Good, Bridport	24 October 1812	Presumed to have foundered 14 April 1828
Swinger	16 November 1811	William Good, Bridport	15 July 1813	Broken up March 1877
Plumper	16 November 1811	William Good, Bridport	9 October 1813	Sold 12 December 1833
Adder	2 November 1812	Robert Davy, Topsham, Exeter	28 June 1813	Wrecked December 1831
Griper	2 November 1812	Richards & Davidson, Hythe, Southampton	14 July 1813	Broken up November 1868
Clinker	2 November 1812	Robert Davy, Topsham, Exeter	15 July 1813	Sale notified 24 January 1867
Pelter	2 November 1812	Henry Tucker, Bideford	27 August 1813	Sold 8 August 1862
Mastiff	2 November 1812	William Taylor, Bideford	25 September 1813	Broken up May 1851
Snapper	2 November 1812	Hobbs & Hellyer, Redbridge, Southampton	27 September 1813	Sold 3 July 1861

=== 1803–1808 ex-French prizes ===
During the early years of the Napoleonic War, some seventeen similar vessels were captured from the French (both naval vessels and privateers) and commissioned in the Royal Navy as gun-brigs. These assorted vessels did not constitute a single class, but as all were procured from the enemy during the Napoleonic War they are here treated similarly.

- Caroline
- Saint Lucia
- Eclipse
- Papillon
- Cerf
- Hirondelle
- Morne Fortunee (i)
- Seaforth
- Hart
- Decouverte
- Unique
- Netley (i)
- Netley (ii)
- Tigress
- Morne Fortunee (ii)
- Swaggerer
- Carlotta (i)
- Carlotta (ii)
- Caledon

=== 1804–1809 purchased vessels ===
- Enchantress
- Linnet
- Pygmy
- Rolla − Purchased 1806; sold 1810
- Maria
- Nancy - Purchased 1809; sold 1813.

=== 1805–1806 ex-Spanish prizes ===
During the Napoleonic War, two similar vessels were captured from the Spanish and commissioned in the Royal Navy as gun-brigs. These vessels did not constitute a single class, but as both were procured from the enemy during this war they are here treated similarly.

- Leocadia
- Raposa

=== 1807 ex-Danish prizes ===
During the Napoleonic War, two similar vessels were captured from the Danes and commissioned in the Royal Navy as gun-brigs. These vessels did not constitute a single class, but as both were procured from the enemy during this war they are here treated similarly.

- Brev Drageren
- Warning

=== 1808–1810 ex-Dutch prize ===
- Patriot
- Jahde
- Ems
- Mandarin (ex Dutch Madurense)

=== 1813 ex-American prize ===
- Mohawk (ex USS Viper)

== See also ==
- Bibliography of 18th–19th century Royal Naval history
