= French frigate Uranie (1800) =

French sailing frigate 1800–1814

History

France
- Name: Uranie
- Namesake: Urania
- Builder: Louis, Antoine, and Mathurin Crucy, Basse-Indre, Nantes; Constructeur: Pierre Degay
- Laid down: 24 September 1796
- Launched: 30 October 1800
- In service: April 1801
- Fate: Scuttled by fire on 3 February 1814

General characteristics
- Displacement: 1,350 tons (French)
- Length: 47.26 m (155.1 ft) (overall); 45.00 m (147.64 ft) (keel)
- Beam: 12.18 m (40.0 ft)
- Draught: 5.85 m (19.2 ft)
- Propulsion: Sail
- Complement: 340 (wartime); 260 (peacetime)
- Armament: UD: 28 × 18-pounder long guns; Spardeck: 12 × 8-pounders + 4 × 36-pounder obusiers
- Armour: Timber

Uranie was a 44-gun frigate of the French Navy, lead ship of her two-vessel class.

== Career ==
She served in the Mediterranean, first under captain Maistral, and later under Margollé, operating from Ancona.

On 6 July 1803, HMS Redbridge sailed from Malta carrying some supernumeraries for Admiral Nelson's fleet and escorting the transport Caroline, Dandison, master, which was carrying water. On the evening of 3 August Redbridge encountered the frigate HMS Phoebe. Next morning Phoebe and Redbridge sighted four sail. Phoebe advised that they were probably French and the British ships set sail to escape. Phoebe was able to outpace their pursuers, but Redbridge was not and fell prey to them.

The four sail were a squadron of French frigates, Cornélie, Rhin, Uranie, and Tamise, and possibly some corvettes that had sortied in the night from Toulon. The French also captured the transport. Redbridge's actual captor was Cornélie. Admiral Nelson attempted to send into Toulon a boat under a flag of truce offering the French a prisoner exchange, but the French refused his letter and proposal.

On 29 September 1810, the newly arrived French frigates Favorite, under Bernard Dubourdieu, and Uranie joined the Venetian squadron of Corona, Bellona, and Carolina. The force then sailed from Chiozzo to Ancona, arriving on 6 October, having sighted Hoste's Amphion in the distance during the passage.

On 27 November 1811, HMS Eagle chased the French frigates Uranie and Corcyre (armed en flute), and corvette Scemplone near Fano. Uranie and Scemplone escaped but Eagle was able to overhaul and capture Corceyre.

== Fate ==
Uranie escaped from Ancona on 16 January 1814. She encountered HMS Cerberus and to avoid her took refuge in Brindisi. HMS Apollo and HMS Havannah then arrived at Brindisi and anchored outside the port. Captain John Taylor, of Apollo then sent a message to the authorities at Brindisi that he understood that the Neapolitan Government had joined the Allies and declared war on the French, and why a French vessel was sheltering there. When Apollo appeared on the scene and made signs of being about to enter the port, Uranie's captain removed the powder from his ship and set her on fire. (Note: A first-class share of the head money for the destruction of the Uranie was worth £159 9s 7¾d; a sixth-class share, that of an ordinary seaman, was worth £1 0s 8½d.)
