= Hired armed cutter Lion =

Two vessels have borne the designation, His Majesty's hired armed cutter Lion. The first served during the French Revolutionary Wars, capturing five privateers and several merchant vessels. The second served briefly at the start of the Napoleonic Wars. Both vessels operated in the Channel. The two cutters may have been the same vessel; at this juncture it is impossible to know. French records report that the French captured the second Lion in 1808 and that she served in the French Navy until 1809.

== First hired armed cutter Lion ==
This vessel served on a contract from 30 March 1793 to 27 January 1801. She was of 8565/94 tons (bm) and was armed with ten 3-pounder guns. She may have been built in 1789.

She was commissioned under Lieutenant W.R. Davies. In late 1793 Lion served in a small squadron under the command of Sir James Saumarez in the frigate Crescent, together with the frigate Druid and the brig Liberty. They convoyed some transports with troops for Jersey and Guernsey, and their picked up pilots for Rear-Admiral MacBride. On 28 November Saumarez detached Lion to take the pilots to MacBride.

Lieutenant Thomas Baker was appointed acting commander from December or perhaps January 1794. He served on her in the Channel as part of the forces under MacBride, before moving into the lugger Valiant on 20 May 1794.

On 8 March 1795 Lion, while under the command of Nick Simmons (or Simmonds, or Symonds) captured the ship Apparencen.

On 16 August 1796, Lion and the revenue cutter Swallow were four leagues — 12 nautical miles (22 km; 14 mi) — west-southwest of Beachy Head when they observed a signal from the signal post alerting them to the presence of an enemy vessel. They set out in pursuit and captured a privateer lugger and her prize, a sloop. The privateer was armed with swivel guns and small arms, and had a crew of 17 men. She was three days out of St Valory and had only captured the sloop.

The next month, on 12 September at 6a.m., Lion was three leagues — 9 nautical miles (17 km; 10 mi) — southeast of Beachy Head when she spotted a French privateer cutter. Lion, under the command of her master, Nick Simmonds, immediately gave chase, but at 7a.m., the privateer, seeing that Lion was going to persist, came up, exchanges several shots with Lion, and the struck. The privateer was the Turot, of four 4-pounder guns, some swivel guns, and small arms, and 25 men under the command of Bernard Emanuel Turat. She was four days out of Havre de Grace and had not yet taken any prizes. (The name of the privateer was later corrected to Turo.)

Three months later, on 15 December, Lion, still under the command of Nick Simmonds, captured a French privateer off the Owers after a four-hour chase. The privateer was the cutter Hazard. She was armed with two carriage guns, two swivel guns, and small arms, and had a crew of 17 men. She was two days out of Fécamp but had captured nothing.

Then in the evening of 2 (or 3) February 1797, Lion, was off Dungeness Point, when she took possession of a French privateer sloop. Captor and prey were astern of a convoy that ranged to eastward. The privateer was the Requin, of Dieppe, armed only with muskets, and having a crew of 20 men. Lion was in company with the Dolphin, but it was Commander Bazely of Harpy who wrote the letter describing the incident, Harpy having arrived as Lion was taking possession of Requin.

In late 1797 or early 1798, Lion was in company with the hired armed cutters Telemachus and Peggy when they captured the Ledia.

On 18 May 1798 Home Riggs Popham led an expedition to Ostend to attack the sluice gates of the Bruge Canal. The expedition landed 1,300 troops under Major General Coote. The army blew up the locks and gates on the Bruges canal but was then forced to surrender. Lion, under the command of Lieutenant S. Bevel (or Bevill) was part of the naval portion of the operation. Lion carried some soldiers from the 23rd Regiment of Foot, which she landed, together with 15 of her crew. They carried some of the mines (explosives) used for blowing up the locks and gates.

On 16 November a French privateer appeared off Hastings. Captain Edward Henry Columbine was the commander of the Sea Fencibles for the area, and Mr. Wexham, master of the Lion, volunteered his vessel to go after the privateer. Columbine put a number of Sea Fencibles aboard Lion, which set out in chase. Lion had to fire on the privateer before she would strike, which cost the life of one Frenchman. The privateer was the Success, of Cherbourg. She was armed with four guns and carried a crew of 24 men under the command of Nicholas Dubois, master. She had been out four days without having made any captures.

Lion, and the hired armed cutters Dolphin and Lord Duncan were in company on 26 March 1799 when they recaptured the brigs Triton and Search.

On 11 October Lion, under the command of Lieutenant William Yawkins, and the hired armed cutter Ann recaptured three small vessels. One of the three was the Elizabeth, of Whitby, Thomas Smith, master. Shortly after he was brought on shore at Deal, Captain Smith died of wounds he sustained when the privateer captured the Elizabeth. Smith's wife, who was on board at the time of the capture, arrived safely.

Late in 1799, Lion was at Goeree-Overflakkee. Three Dutch vessels had taken refuge there and an overage merchant hoy, the Overyssel, was to be sunk at the mouth of the harbour to impede their escape. A sudden gale overturned Overyssel, but a boat from Lion saved some of the crew.

At the end of December or in early January 1800, Lion took up station at Newhaven, at the behest of the merchants of Lewes, for the "protection of ships trading to and from that port".

In February 1800, Lieutenant W. Tatham, the former first lieutenant of Director, which was being decommissioned, was appointed to command Lion. In April Lion captured, off Scaford, Sussex, a smuggling vessel from Folkestone, with 500 pieces of contraband.

In April, Lion captured the French fishing boats Julie and Recompense. Then on 17 June Lion and the sloop Osprey sailed from The Downs with a large number of merchant ships.

Lion was anchored in St Aubin's Bay, Jersey in November 1800 when a severe gale came up on 9 November, which drove her onshore. Although several other vessels in the bay such as Pelican, suffered similarly, they were refloated. The schooner Redbridge and the hired armed brig Telegraph got safely out to sea, though Telegraph had to cut away her mainmast. Havick, however, was so badly damaged that she was abandoned as a wreck. Neither Havick nor Pelican suffered any casualties, though the crews were subject to waves breaking over them for six hours until the tide, which had risen 32 feet (9.8 m) (perpendicular), providentially receded.

== Second hired armed cutter Lion ==
This vessel served between 15 June 1804 and 23 August 1805. She was of 86 66/94 tons (bm) and carried eight 12-pounder carronades. On 17 September 1804 Lion came into Portsmouth with a vessel with a cargo of salt that she had detained, and then immediately left again on a cruise. Lion arrived at Portsmouth on 22 January 1805 and reported that off Havre she had come upon a sloop floating keel uppermost. Lion had left the sloop Isle of Wight towing the vessel.

French records report that French peniches captured Lion ca. 15 May 1808 off the Sables d'Olonne. The records describe her as having a displacement of 90 tons (French), and being armed with eight 12-pounder carronades. Lloyd's List of 27 May reported that several gunboats had captured the privateer Lion, of Plymouth, off the French coast. (Readily available records of letters of marque do not show any contemporary one issued to any vessel matching Lion's description.) The French navy employed Lion as a cutter and sold her c.1809.
