= Expedition to Ostend =

Military expedition during the French revolutionary wars

- Part of the French Revolutionary Wars
Date	18–20 May 1798
Location	Ostend, French First Republic
Result	See Aftermath

Belligerents
(Kingdom of Great Britain) Great Britain	(First French Empire) France; Batavian Republic

Commanders and leaders
Home Riggs Popham; Eyre Coote (POW)	Augustin Kellar

Strength
27 ships 1,400 soldiers	Local garrisons

Casualties and losses
163 killed and wounded 1,134 captured	

The British expedition to Ostend took place on 18 May 1798 during the French Revolutionary Wars. The expedition was intended to destroy the gun-boats harboured in Ostend, since they were destined to take part in the planned invasion of Britain. It also hoped to destroy the infrastructure of the port including the locks, basin-gates, and sluices of the Bruges–Ostend Canal. The expedition was a combined Royal Navy and British Army expedition under the command of Captain Home Popham (R.N.) and Major-General Eyre Coote. The British destroyed their objectives, but bad weather meant that the army contingent was unable to disembark, and after a brief fight were captured by the French.

== Background ==
=== Planning ===
In 1798 the French Revolutionary Wars were ongoing and France had for several years been threatening what would be the first of several planned invasions of Britain. By the start of the year the majority of the invasion forces brought together for this had been diverted to join the French campaign in Egypt and Syria, but enough remained to cause worry. Prime Minister William Pitt the Younger and his government, aware of the invasion flotilla that had been built up in France and the Batavian Republic, put out requests for solutions to halt or defend against Napoleon's plans. These included the scouring of the archives to create a dossier of documents profiling how the English had planned to defend against the Spanish Armada of 1588, which Pitt then used to create the Provisional Cavalry and Army of Reserve. In April a proposal was put forward by General Sir Charles Grey, the commander of the British Army's Southern District, for offensive anti-invasion operations.

In order to avoid attacks by Royal Navy warships in the English Channel, the French were moving their invasion craft from Flushing to Ostend and Dunkirk using the newly expanded Bruges–Ostend Canal. At nearby Sas-Slijkens large sluice gates had been built but left unprotected. Grey put forward the plan on the recommendation of Captain Home Riggs Popham of the Royal Navy, who suggested that an amphibious landing be made at Ostend where they could then destroy the canal's basin gates and the new sluices. This would hamper the operational capability of the canal and interrupt French maritime movement between Holland, Flanders, and France, stopping the Dutch part of the invasion flotilla from assembling.

=== Organisation ===
The government supported the plan, but the Admiralty, to whom Popham had to submit his idea, found his request to lead it problematic. While he had military experience of Flanders from his service as a staff officer during the Flanders campaign, he was only a junior captain in the Royal Navy, aged thirty-six. It was felt that if he was given command of such a large operation over the heads of many more senior officers it would do more harm than good. In order to force the Admiralty's hand in appointing him, Popham spoke to Grey and had him back his appointment; with this support Popham was give charge of the operation. This was the first of several delays that the operation went through.

For the operation Popham was given a squadron of twenty-seven warships, of which five had been converted into troopships. The Admiralty had initially promised that this force would be prepared and brought together for Popham before the end of April, within ten days of the plan being finalised, but this was not actually completed until four weeks later on 13 May. The landing force for the expedition was provided by the army, and was commanded by Major-General Eyre Coote. The general brought with him around 1,400 troops, which group consisted of light companies from the First, Coldstream, and Third Guards, light and grenadier companies from the 23rd and 49th Regiment of Foot, the entirety of the 11th Regiment of Foot, and small contingents of the Royal Artillery and 17th Light Dragoons. A separate group of warships was initially planned to go to Dunkirk to ensure that no enemy ships could escape there to defend Ostend once the attack was underway, but this was later abandoned.

Popham was fully aware that the expedition was dangerous and might fail, and that his part in it was very unpopular with many members of the military. He sent a letter to the First Lord of the Admiralty Lord Spencer requesting that if he was unsuccessful that Spencer would ensure Popham's subsequent trial would be fair. The force was ready to set sail on 14 May.

== Expedition ==
=== Landings ===
Popham only revealed his plans, which had been kept highly secret, to his men once the ships were at sea. Intending to make a quick crossing of the English Channel, the ships were initially halted in this action by a violent gale off the coast of Kent, and only reached their destination on 16 May. Popham set out to begin the attack the same night. Five warships (Note: HMS Champion, HMS Dart, HMS Wolverine, HMS Crash, and HMS Acute) were assigned to attack the west of Ostend at first light, distracting enemy forces and destroying the batteries emplaced there. Five other ships (Note: HMS Kite, HMS Cracker, HMS Asp, Vigilant, and HMS Biter) were to ensure that the mouth of Ostend harbour was kept open for the British, and to attack any shipping they found to the east of the town. Two bomb ketches (Note: HMS Tartarus and HMS Hecla) were to respectively anchor to the north-north-west and east of the town to bombard it. The rest of the ships and Coote's soldiers would then be left to the main attack, for which Popham attached a naval brigade formed with seamen from his largest vessels to bolster it. Another contingent of sailors were assigned to take the mines ashore that would destroy the gates. Armed cutters were organised to go ahead of the force to show them the way in.

While Popham's crews had been trained to arrive at their positions in the dead of night without the use of signals, a turn in the weather forced Popham to abandon the first attack. The expedition stayed at sea for another two days before on 18 May a captured ship revealed to Popham and Coote that the invasion craft at Flushing were making haste down the canal for Ostend and Dunkirk. With the weather having improved, it was decided that the attack should immediately go forward. The ships reached their various starting points at 1 a.m. on 19 May, by which time the wind had gotten up again and the sea was becoming rougher. Popham deliberated putting off the attack again, but was stopped in this from intelligence taken from a newly captured pilot boat that the nearby garrisons were all very small.

Hearing the news, Coote begged Popham for the landings to go ahead, expecting that by the time their mission had been completed the weather would have quietened enough that the troops could reembark safely. Popham put the landings into effect immediately without waiting for the troopships to organise themselves, so that the de-embarkation was done out of the pre-arranged order. Coote's troops began to be landed, unobserved, on sandbanks 3 miles (4.8 km) east of Ostend. The presence of British troops was not first reported by the Dutch for several hours, and at 4:15 a.m. the Ostend batteries opened fire on the British ships of the two harbour parties. Popham's bomb ketches then began to return fire, quickly setting fires in the town and damaging ships in the canal basin. Apart from one troopship that had become separated during the night, Coote's soldiers were all landed with their equipment by 5 a.m.

=== Canal gates destroyed ===
The weather at sea continued to worsen after this and Coote looked to hurry the attack. At around 6 a.m. the warships assigned to the east side of Ostend harbour were sent towards the shore so that they could give covering fire to the troops as they made their advance on the sluices. As they began to receive heavy damage, Popham started rotating the ships assigned to attack the Ostend batteries so that the distraction could continue on, but the ships then found that as the water around the batteries had lowered they could not get close enough to attack, leaving the batteries open to take aim at Coote's soldiers. In order to distract the guns while the mines were brought up to destroy the gates a request for surrender was sent to the commander of the Ostend garrison. Major-General Harry Burrard then succeeded with some of the Guards light infantry, 23rd and 49th grenadiers, and two field guns in securing the approaches to the harbour, despite attacks from a multitude of sharpshooters.

Men were sent to ensure that the garrison could not send fresh defenders across from the town via the harbour ferry route, and defensive positions were taken up around the sluices. Portions of the 11th and 23rd light infantry took control of Bredene and the coastal road. At 9:30 a.m. the missing troopship, HMS Minerva, arrived at Ostend and while the ship's captain was ashore reporting to Coote Lieutenant-Colonel Henry Warde commandeered some flat-bottomed boats and attempted to bring his four companies ashore. The sea was so rough by this stage that he was persuaded by another ship to give up landing his reinforcements in case they were all killed in the attempt. The operation on shore continued, and at 10:20 a.m. the canal locks and sluices were blown up by a mixed party of sailors and engineers.

=== Coote cut off ===
Coote's force then began to make its way back to the landing beach, finding minimal resistance as it did so and having only five casualties. They reached the beach at around 11 a.m., and Popham looked to re-embark them all by noon. The weather, however, had continued to worsen and it was now impossible to get any men off the beach. Coote found his communication with Popham's ships cut off, and on his own initiative attempted to send some boats of troops off to the ships. These boats quickly filled with water as they made way and the men on board only narrowly avoided being killed. Seeing that further attempts to get to sea were hopeless and expecting that the weather would moderate on the following day, Coote formed a position on the sandbanks, facing inland. There the engineers hastily constructed breastworks and the available field guns and howitzers were brought up in defensive positions.

The force stayed at the ready in their positions through the following day and night, with the weather conditions getting steadily worse. News of the attack had since reached the surrounding settlements, and soldiers had been formed together from the garrisons at Ghent, Bruges, and Dunkirk to repulse the British. At around 4 a.m. on 20 May these troops came up with Coote's force on the beach, organised into two columns directly opposing the British with other units on the flanks. Popham observed the French attack from his ships but the sea state meant that he was still unable to do anything to assist Coote. The French force pushed the British flanks in over a period of two hours of fighting, during which time Coote himself was badly injured while trying to rally the 11th. The decision was then made to capitulate, before which the Royal Artillery pushed its guns into the sea to stop them from being captured. Coote's force lost 163 men killed and wounded, with 1,134 men subsequently captured.

== Aftermath ==
When it was clear the Coote had surrendered, Popham weighed anchor and moved out to sea. Plans had been made to follow up the Ostend operation with similar attacks on the Scheldt and at Flushing, but these did not take place. Despite the ignominious end to Coote's force, the goal of the operation had been achieved. Lord Buckingham wrote to the Foreign Secretary Lord Grenville that he was "extremely happy in the success of your very important and very well digested attempt upon Ostend", calling it a "complete success". Despite the failure to rescue Coote's force, naval historian Sir Julian Corbett argues that as the destruction of the canal gates had the impact they had intended, the expedition was "a thoroughly well-designed, and brilliantly-executed enterprise". The Admiralty was blamed for the loss of Coote, with it being suggested that had Popham come up against less opposition to his plan in April then it would have been put into action before the coming of the bad weather and the losses would have been avoided.

== Royal Navy force ==
Ship	Guns	Commander	Notes	Ref.
HMS Expedition	26	Captain Home Riggs Popham	Nominally of 44 guns. Armed en flute as a troopship	
HMS Circe	28	Captain Robert Winthrop		
HMS Vestal	28	Captain Charles White		
HMS Ariadne	20	Captain James Bradby		
HMS Champion	20	Captain Henry Raper		
HMS Hebe	14	Commander William Birchall	Nominally of 38 guns. Armed en flute as a troopship	
HMS Minerva	14	Commander John McKellar	Nominally of 38 guns. Armed en flute as a troopship	
HMS Druid	12	Commander Charles Apthorpe	Nominally of 32 guns. Armed en flute as a troopship	
HMS Harpy	16	Commander Henry Bazely		
HMS Savage	16	Commander Norborne Thompson		
HMS Dart	16	Commander Richard Raggett	Nominally of 28 guns. Armed en flute as a troopship	
HMS Kite	16	Commander William Brown		
HMS Tartarus	8	Commander Thomas Hand		
HMS Hecla	8	Commander James Oughton		
HMS Wolverine	16	Commander Lewis Mortlock		
HMS Blazer	12	Lieutenant Daniel Burgess		
HMS Vesuve	4	Lieutenant William Elliott		
HMS Crash	12	Lieutenant Bulkeley Macworth Praed		
HMS Boxer	12	Lieutenant Thomas Gilbert		
HMS Acute	12	Lieutenant Jeremiah Seaver		
HMS Asp	12	Lieutenant Joseph Edmonds		
HMS Furnace	12	Lieutenant Maurice William Suckling		
HMS Biter	12	Lieutenant John de Vitre		
HMS Cracker	12	Lieutenant Thomas Aitkinson		
Vigilant	6			
Terrier	12	T. Lewen		
Lion	10	S. Bevel		
