= HMS Redbridge (1798) =

British schooner-rigged gunboat

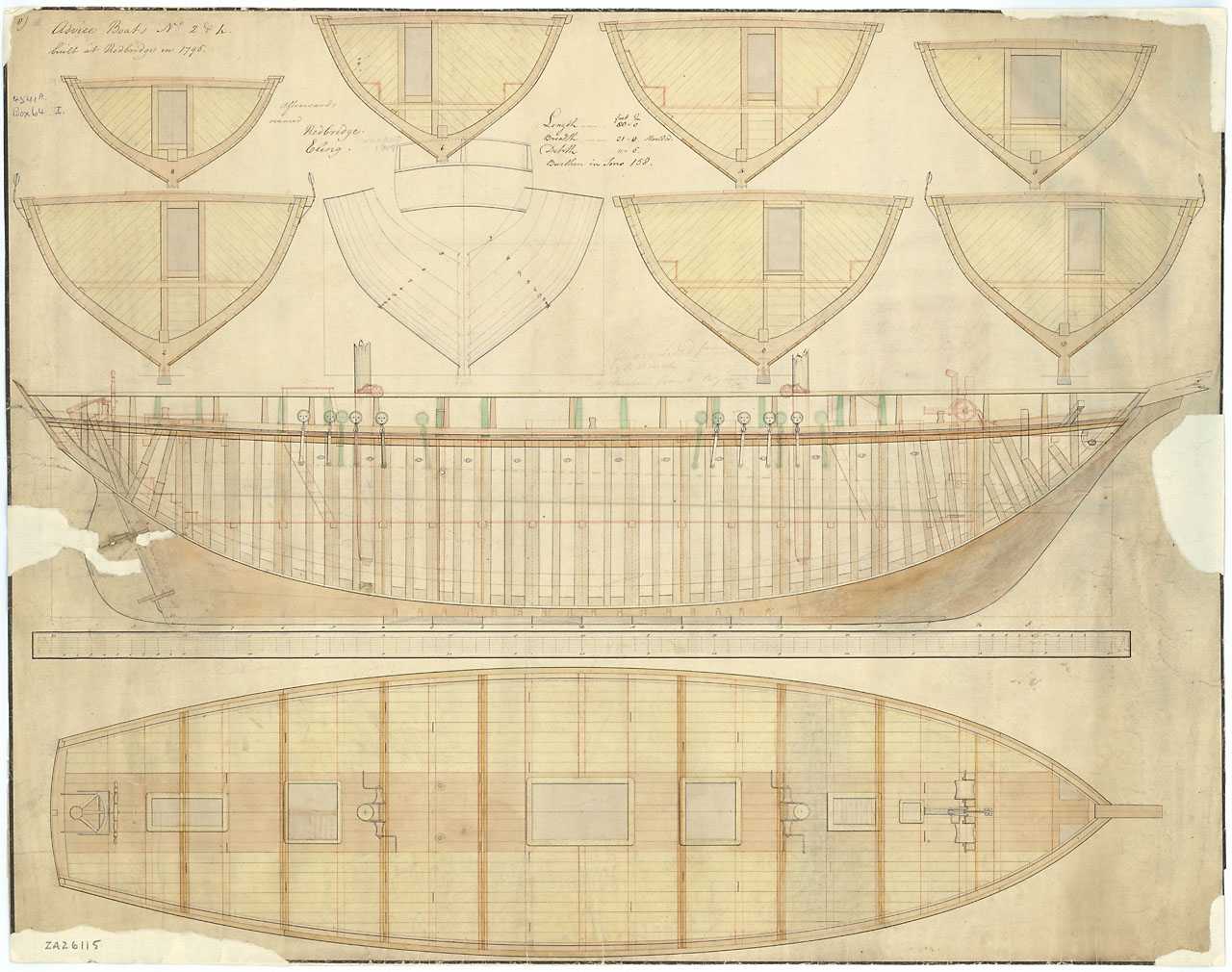
- Plans for HMS Eling, National Maritime Museum, Greenwich, London;

History

Great Britain
- Name: HMS Redbridge
- Builder: Hobbs & Hellyer, Redbridge
- Laid down: 1796
- Acquired: 1798 by purchase
- Fate: Captured 1803

France
- Name: Redbridge
- Launched: August 1803 by capture
- Decommissioned: 1813
- Fate: Sold 1814

General characteristics
- Type: Experimental design
- Displacement: 150 tons (French)
- Tons burthen: 148 (bm)
- Length: 80 ft 0 in (24.4 m) (overall); 56 ft 7 1/2 in (17.3 m) (keel)
- Beam: 22 ft 2 in (6.8 m)
- Depth of hold: 11 ft 6 in (3.5 m)
- Sail plan: Schooner
- Complement: British service: 50; French service: 107
- Armament: British service: 12 × 18-pounder carronades + 2 × 12-pounder carronades; French service: 12 × 16-pounder guns (British 18-pounder?), or 14 × 22-pounder carronades (British 24-pounder?)

HMS Redbridge was one of four schooner-rigged gunboats built to an experimental design by Sir Samuel Bentham. Her launch date is unknown, but the Admiralty purchased her in April 1798. She had a short, relatively uneventful career before the French captured her in 1803. The French Navy sold her in January 1814.

== Design ==
Hobbs & Hellyer built six vessels to Bentham's design. Redbridge was the second of a two-vessel class of schooners, and she and her classmate Eling were the smallest of the six vessels, smaller even than the other two schooners, Milbrook and Netley. The design featured a large-breadth to length ratio with structural bulkheads, and sliding keels. The vessels were also virtually double-ended.

== French Revolutionary wars ==
Lieutenant George Hays took command of Redbridge on 10 April 1798. He remained in command of her until 11 December 1800.

Hayes's replacement was Lieutenant George Lemprière, and she was stationed in the Channel. The great gale of 8–9 November 1800 caught Redbridge and several other vessels in St Aubyn's Bay, Jersey. Redbridge, which managed to get to sea, was widely believed to have been lost. Still, she arrived in Spithead on Wednesday 12 November, though without her guns, which she had thrown overboard to lighten her. She went into harbour to effectuate repairs. Havik, Pelican, the hired armed cutter Lion, and a Guernsey privateer were driven ashore. Havick was so badly damaged that she was abandoned as a wreck. The other three vessels were refloated. The hired armed brig Telegraph too got out to sea and was saved though she lost her mast.

On 31 March 1801 Redbridge engaged a French brig in the Bay of Saint-Brieuc.

On 24 April 1802 Lemprière sailed Redbridge to Dublin, carrying seamen.

== Capture ==
In May 1803, shortly after the onset of the Napoleonic Wars, Redbridge was in Malta. She sailed from Malta on 6 July carrying some supernumeraries for Admiral Nelson's fleet and escorting the transport Caroline, Dandison, master, which was carrying water. Lemprière cruised off Toulon but could not find the fleet and decided to sail to Gibraltar. Early on 3 August he encountered Cameleon, which advised him the British fleet was further west. That evening Redbridge encountered the frigate Phoebe. Next morning Phoebe and Redbridge sighted four sail. Phoebe advised that they were probably French and the British ships set sail to escape. Phoebe was able to outpace their pursuers, but Redbridge was not and fell prey to them.

The four sail were a squadron of French frigates, Cornélie, Rhin, Uranie, and Tamise, and possibly some corvettes that had sortied in the night from Toulon. The French also captured the transport. Redbridge's actual captor was Cornélie. Admiral Nelson attempted to send into Toulon a boat under a flag of truce offering the French a prisoner exchange, but the French refused his letter proposing the exchange.

== French service and fate ==
The French commissioned Redbridge on 5 August 1803. They decommissioned her at Leghorn in 1813, and sold her in January 1814.

== Postscripts ==
At the time of Redbridge's capture, Lemprière had aboard an unauthorised copy of the British naval signal book. At the time, officers below the rank of commander were forbidden by regulations to have such copies, but many did so. Unfortunately, Lemprière did not have the presence of mind to destroy the book before the French captured him. The French used the signals to try to lure into Toulon a British boat outside the harbour, but the captain, sensing something amiss, did not take the bait. When Nelson found out that the flags had been compromised he changed them and informed the Admiralty. On 4 November the Admiralty ordered all commanders-in-chief to change the numeral flags in accordance with a new pattern. The Admiralty also ordered that the commanders impound all other unauthorised copies.

Lemprière later drowned when a boat he was in capsized in Toulon harbour. His crew endured 11 years of captivity. The French released them after Napoleon abdicated at Fointainbleau on 14 April 1814. The crew underwent court martial on 14 June 1814.
