= William Birchall =

Officer in the Royal Navy during the French Revolutionary and Napoleonic wars

- Born: 1769; Bath, Somerset, UK
- Died: 1817 (aged 47–48) Exeter, Devon, UK
- Buried: St Sidwell's Church, Exeter
- Allegiance: Kingdom of Great Britain; United Kingdom
- Branch: Royal Navy
- Rank: Post-captain

William Birchall (1769–1817) was an officer in the Royal Navy who served during the French Revolutionary and Napoleonic Wars. Promoted to lieutenant in 1790, he served aboard HMS Montagu at the Glorious First of June. Birchall was made a commander for acting with "zeal and intrepidity" during a boat action with a French privateer and promoted to post-captain following the Battle of Copenhagen in 1801. Later, in 1803, Birchall commanded the Chester region Sea Fencibles. He died in Exeter in 1817.

== Early life and career ==
Birchall was born in Bath, Somerset, in 1769. His father was a cabinetmaker and upholsterer. Very little is known about his early life but his examination for lieutenant in 1790 and eventual promotion on 18 June 1793, were recorded in the Bath Chronicle, which added that he had served 13 years as a midshipman. Birchall served on HMS Montagu at the time of his promotion, continuing in her to the West Indies and was probably still on board when she fought at the Glorious First of June (1794).

"but Mr Birchall, the first lieutenant, with a Degree of Zeal and intrepidity, volunteered to attack her [Potomac] in a boat"

— Extract from Captain Thomas Martin's dispatch to Vice-Admiral Kingsmill, 27 October 1796.

Birchall had joined HMS Santa Margarita by 1796, as second-in-command to Captain Thomas Byam Martin. Towards the end of October, Santa Margarita was involved in two actions with French privateers in the English Channel. Having already taken the 16-gun Buonoparte earlier in the day, on the night of 23 October, Santa Margarita was approached by two other ships, that came almost within hailing distance before suddenly moving away in different directions. Santa Margarita gave each a broadside before setting off in pursuit of the larger vessel. In the meantime, Birchall had gathered five others in a boat and set off after the other, which had been badly damaged and was now disabled. The ship they eventually boarded and captured, turned out to be the Potomac, an ex-British merchantmen from Poole, possessed by a French prize-crew. Santa Margarita caught up with, and after a few more shots, forced the surrender of the 16-gun Vengeur. Being almost outnumbered by their prisoners, the British then put into Plymouth.

== Command ==
Having earned a mention in dispatches for his "Zeal and intrepidity" in the boat action with Potomac, Birchall was made a commander in 1797 and by 1798, had commissioned the lightly armed but fast troopship, Hebe. (Note: Hebe was a former 38-gun frigate, cut down and serving en flute with 14 guns. She did not therefore require a captain.) In May, she was serving in a squadron under Home Popham, sent to prevent the movement of a large number of enemy barges from Vlissingen to Dunkirk. The large flat-bottomed boats were to be used to convey troops across the Channel for Napoleon's planned invasion of the United Kingdom. At that time, the flotilla was travelling along the inland waterways of Belgium to Ostend, where the British hoped to stop them by destroying the lock gates and sluices there. A force was gathered at Margate, comprising 25 small vessels, of which Popham's 26-gun Expedition was the largest, and over 1,000 troops, a good proportion of which were held aboard Hebe.

The expedition set off on 14 May and arrived, while still dark, on the morning of 19 May. The troops were landed in bad weather while Popham's squadron provided covering fire. Some of the smaller vessels were badly damaged by the enemy batteries and had to withdraw but Hebe, being more heavily constructed, was able to kedge in close to the shore to continue the bombardment. The troops accomplished their mission but were prevented from re-embarking by the worsening weather and were captured by a superior French force, the following day.

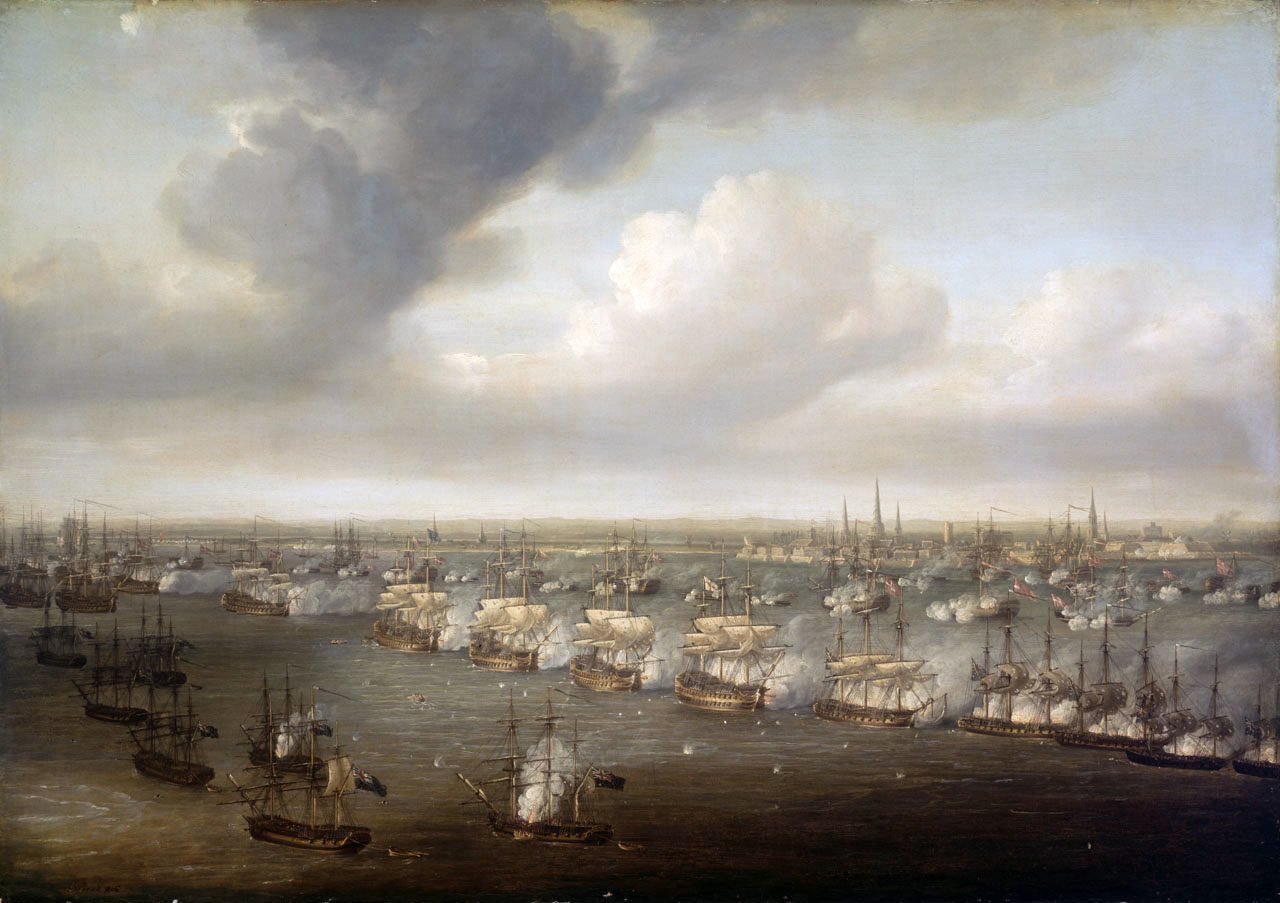
Battle of Copenhagen by Nicholas Pocock

Birchall was given command of the 18-gun brig HMS Harpy in March 1800. On 9 January 1801, Harpy and the revenue cutter Greyhound, recaptured the 12-gun cutter, Constitution. She had been taken earlier that day by two French privateers off the Isle of Portland. Immediately prior to the Battle of Copenhagen in April 1801, Harpy was one of the smaller vessels that took soundings and marked channels in the Hollands Diep and around the Middle Ground shoal, allowing all but three of Horatio Nelson's squadron to pass safely and engage the Danish fleet. (Note: HMS Bellona and HMS Russell ran aground, HMS Agamemnon could not navigate the intricate passage and was forced to anchor.) After the action, Birchall noticed the Danes attempting to warp away one of their ships. He ordered a line attached to Sjaelland and towed her away as a prize.

Birchall and Harpy were ordered to remain off Copenhagen to ensure that terms of the armistice were honoured and to let other British ships know that Nelson had taken the fleet to Bornholm. He was promoted to post-captain for his actions.

== Marriage ==
Birchall married three times during his life but left no children. He was very young and still a midshipman, when he met and married his first bride in Lyme Regis in 1786. Esther Delaney was his senior by some years and died in 1806 at Bathampton. Birchall took another wife almost immediately, marrying Jane Cross from Bath, in Marylebone. She died in 1811 in Ilfracombe. He eventually remarried again in 1815. His last wife was Leonora, one of the Binghams from Bingham's Melcombe in Dorset.

== Later career and death ==
In 1803, Birchall was given command of the Chester region Sea Fencibles and, according to the Bath Chronicle, caused a riot on 26 December when he impressed one of the local militia. Following their Christmas parade, the militia responded angrily, attacking the gaol and meeting house, where they tore down Birchall's flag. Birchall was asked to leave town while the army restored order.

Birchall died in Exeter in 1817, then was buried at its St. Sidwell's church (now chapel) which the Luftwaffe destroyed in the Exeter Blitz of 1942.
