= French corvette Aurore (1799) =

Aurore
History

France
- Name: Aurore
- Builder: Le Havre
- Laid down: November 1797
- Launched: 16 July 1799
- Captured: 18 January 1801

United Kingdom
- Name: Charwell (or Cherwell)
- Acquired: 18 January 1801 by capture
- Commissioned: April 1803
- Out of service: Laid up in July 1810
- Fate: Sold 1813

General characteristics
- Class & type: Mutine-class corvette
- Displacement: 379-400 tons (French)
- Tons burthen: 34581/94 (bm)
- Length: 102 ft 1 in (31.1 m) (overall); 78 ft 8 in (24.0 m) (keel)
- Beam: 28 ft 9 in (8.8 m)
- Depth of hold: 13 ft 1 1/4 in (4.0 m)
- Propulsion: Sails
- Complement: French service: 156; British service: 96
- Armament: French service: 16 × 8-pounder guns; British service: 14 × 18-pounder carronades + 2 × 9-pounder guns

The 16-gun French Mutine-class corvette Aurore was launched in 1799. The British frigate HMS Thames captured her in 1801; she was commissioned into the Royal Navy in 1803 and named HMS Charwell (or Cherwell). Charwell served in the Channel, South Atlantic, and Indian Ocean. She was laid up in 1810 and sold in 1813.

== French career and capture ==
Aurore was built to a design by Charles-Henri Le Tellier. From April to July 1800 she was on a liaison mission to Île de France, via Brest and Santa Cruz de Tenerife. On 23 September she was fitted out at Brest. She then sailed again for Île de France. At the time her captain was lieutenant de vaisseau Charles Girault.

On 18 January Thames, under the command of Captain William Lukin, captured Aurore. She carried as a passenger the Governor’s Aide de Camp, who was carrying dispatches.

She arrived at Plymouth on 6 February. She was then fitted out there between March and June 1803. The Royal Navy already had an Aurore in service (as a prison ship), so renamed the prize HMS Charwell after the River Cherwell, a tributary of the River Thames.

== British career ==
Charwell was commissioned in April 1803 under Commander Phillip Dumaresq. (Note: Dumaresque had been captain of Calpe in 1801 and had sailed for several months in company with Thames, then under the command of Captain Aiskew Paffard Hollis.) In early May Charwell was in the Hamoaze completely rigged and fitted for sea, but was short a crew. Once he had succeeded in forming a crew, Dumaresque sailed her in the Channel. However, by 1 September she was back in the Hamoaze. She had grounded on some rocks on the French coast. There she had had to throw her guns overboard to lighten her sufficiently that the next incoming tide could lift her. At Plymouth she was going to have some of her copper plates removed to permit inspection of her hull.

On 13 September 1803 Cerberus served as flagship to Admiral Sir James Saumarez. Saumarez commanded a small squadron comprising the sloops of war Charwell and Kite, the schooner Eling, the cutter Carteret, and the bomb vessels Sulphur and Terror. The squadron massed for a bombardment of the port of Granville where there were some gunboats moored. The squadron bombarded the port several times over the next two days. On 15 September, as Cerberus was withdrawing, she grounded. For the three hours it took to refloat her nine gunboats harried her, but without effect. When the rest of the squadron, came up they drove the gunboats away. The British retired with no information on what, if anything, the bombardment had achieved.

In September 1806 Charwell was at Guernsey, under Commander Phillip Brown. However, in October Commander Edwin Chamberlyn replaced Brown. Charwell then sailed with the convoy to the River Plate where the British planned to attack Montevideo. At Montevideo, the Navy furnished guns and men for batteries. In the siege Charwell had one man killed and one missing.

In April 1807 Commander the Honourable William Gordon replaced Chamberlyn. Then in 1809 Lieutenant Charles Robb sailed her for the Cape of Good Hope. On 15 July 1808 Nereide, Otter, and Charwell shared in the capture of the French brig Lucie, and her cargo of slaves. (Note: A first-class share of the bounty-money was worth £8 16s 6½d; a sixth-class share was worth 3s 1d.)

On 28 June 1809, Charwell captured the French letter of marque Hyène. Hyène was on her way from Bordeaux to Iles de France with a cargo of wine and naval stores when Charwell captured her. Admiral Bertie, commander of the Cape of Good Hope Station, described Hyène as "a very fine vessel of 230 tons, pierced for 18 Guns and masted as a man of war". (Note: In February 1829 bounty money was paid. A first-class share was worth £47 6s 1½d; a sixth-class share, that of an ordinary seaman, was worth 16s 9¼d. A month earlier head money for the 50 men of Hyène's crew had been paid.)

In March 1810 Commander James Tomkinson replaced Robb. He then sailed Charwell back to Britain as escort to a convoy.

== Fate ==
Charwell was laid up at Deptford in July 1810. The Admiralty first offered her for sale in August 1812. She was sold 28 April 1813 for £700.
