= Dutch sloop Havik =

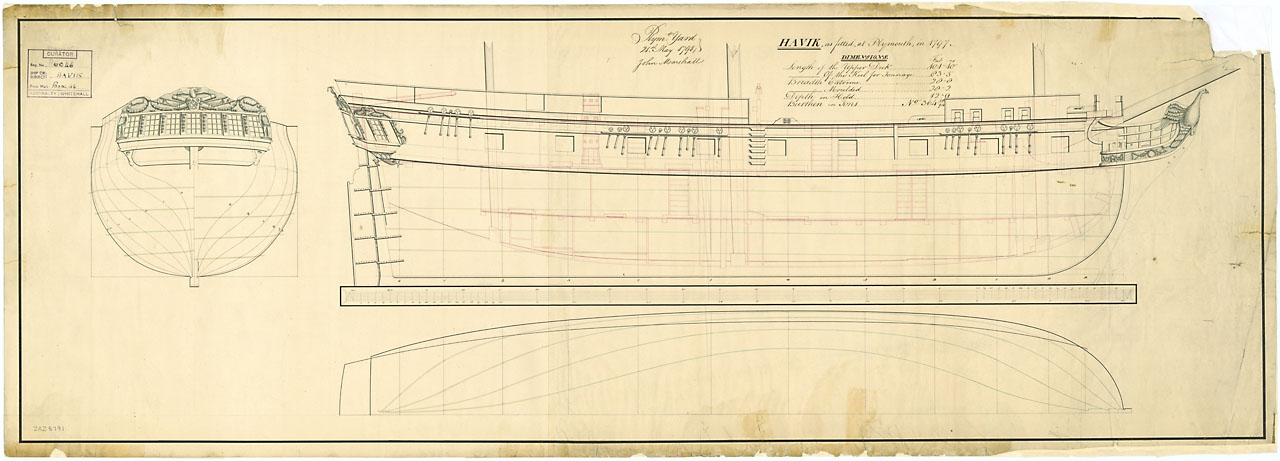
- Havick

History

Dutch Republic
- Name: de Havik
- Builder: Amsterdam
- Launched: 1784
- Captured: 17 August 1796

Great Britain
- Name: HMS Havick
- Acquired: 17 August 1796 by capture
- Fate: Wrecked 9 November 1800

General characteristics
- Type: Ship-sloop
- Tons burthen: 364 58/94 (bm)
- Length: Dutch: 110' (Amsterdam foot) (Note: All linear measurements are in Amsterdam feet (voet) of 11 Amsterdam inches (duim) (see Dutch units of measurement). The Amsterdam foot is about 8% shorter than an English foot. The basis of measurement is also different. The data is from Winfield. Because she was built at Amsterdam, the Rotterdams jaarboekje unfortunately does not mention this Havic.); British:101 ft 10 in (31.0 m) (overall); 83 ft 5 in (25.4 m) (keel)
- Beam: Dutch: 30'; British:28 ft 2 in (8.6 m)
- Depth of hold: Dutch: 12' 9"; British:12 ft 9 in (3.9 m)
- Propulsion: Sails
- Complement: Dutch service:150; British service:121
- Armament: Dutch service:16-18 guns; British service: 18 × 6-pounder guns; 6 × 12-pounder carronades

The Dutch ship sloop Havik was launched in 1784 and served in the Batavian Navy. The British captured her in 1796 at the capitulation of Saldanha Bay. She then served briefly in the Royal Navy as HMS Havick (or Havik, or Havock) before she was wrecked in late 1800.

== Dutch service and capture ==
Havik was a ship sloop with a quarterdeck, built at Amsterdam in 1784 for the Admiralty of Amsterdam under the 8th Charter.

At Saldanha Bay a squadron of the Batavian Navy, under the command of Rear-Admiral Engelbertus Lucas, surrendered without a fight to a Royal Navy squadron under the command of Vice-Admiral George Elphinstone at Saldanha Bay on 17 August 1796. Havik was one of the vessels that the British captured. At the time of her capture, Havik, under the command of Lieutenant Pieter Bessemer (or Bezemer), was armed with 18 guns and had a crew of 76 men.

Commander Charles Ekins was appointed to HMS Echo, supposed to be at the Cape of Good Hope, but found, on his arrival, that she had been condemned and broken up. He sailed Havik back to Britain. After his return to Britain, he was advanced to post captain on 22 December 1796.

== British service ==
Havick underwent fitting at Plymouth in the first two weeks or so of January 1797. The Royal Navy commissioned her under Commander Philip Bartholomew that month with the role of cruising and escorting convoys.

On 28 March 1799, Havik and the hired armed brig Telegraph sailed from Plymouth for the Île de Batz. Eight days later, Telegraph captured the French privateer Hirondelle on 5 May 1799 in a notable action. Havick claimed a share of the prize money, a claim that Telegraph's officers and crew contested. The matter was not settled until 1818. (Note: A distribution of the monies took place in November 1818, after Bartholomew had died, as had many crew members from Telegraph. A first-class share to Havick was worth £54 11s 9d; a fifth-class share, that of a seaman, was worth 6s 10¼d.)

One month after leaving Plymouth Havik returned, escorting two French brigs and a Dutch East Indiaman, Zeeland, which was sailing from Tranquebar to Copenhagen. On 15 May Havick sailed with a convoy to Cork.

On 25 August Havick brought into Plymouth the Hedwin, Rosenzen, master, which had been sailing from Almeria to Hamburg. On 18 September Havick brought in the Swedish brig Aurora, of Gothenburg, Sandelhus, master. Aurora had been sailing from Tenerife to Hamburg with a cargo of barilla.

On 29 January 1800, Havick was in the Channel when Suffisante signaled to Havick to chase north. There Havik observed a ship, a cutter, and a lugger fleeing to the southeast. Havik captured the ship, which was the American vessel Strafford, of 16 guns and carrying a cargo of tobacco from Baltimore to London; she had been a prize to the other two fleeing vessels, and Bartholomew believed that her cargo was worth £30–40,000. Suffisante captured both, which turned out to be the lugger Courageux and the cutter Grand Quinola. Courageux was armed with four 4-pounder guns and one 18-pounder carronade, and had a crew of 42 men. Grand Quinnola was armed with 8-pounder brass carronades, two 2-pounder brass guns, two 2-pounder iron guns, and swivel guns; she had a crew of 47 men. The two privateers had left Saint-Malo together three days earlier. Havick and Suffisante shared their prize money with Centaur and the hired armed brig Fanny.

Landrich, a prize to Havick, arrived at Plymouth on 28 February. Landrich had been sailing from San Domingo for Bremen. She was followed on 6 March by Landrake, which was carrying a cargo of sugar from San Domingo to Hamburg.

On 3 September Havick and Suffisante encountered a French flotilla of 14 vessels carrying provisions and stores to the French fleet at Brest, and under the escort of a frigate armed en flute, with 18 guns, a corvette of 18 guns, and a brig of 14 guns. The British engaged the French and drove them under the protection of shore batteries near Morlaix. Fire from the batteries killed two men on Havick, and wounded two, including Lieutenant Bayley. (Note: The article in the Naval Chronicle states that Bayley was captain of Havick, which appears incorrect, or possible reflects a temporary command. The article in the London Chronicle refers to Baylely as a lieutenant, and makes no mention of any deaths.)

== Fate ==
Havick was under Batholomew's command and had been tasked with patrolling between the Channel Islands and the Île de Batz so she anchored in St Aubyn's Bay, Jersey in November 1800 to take on a local pilot. She lost her anchor and had to resort to a makeshift. When a severe gale came up on 9 November, it drove her onshore. The crew cut away her masts and threw her guns overboard, but Havick nevertheless filled with water and settled into the sand. When the tide went out she settled even further. Although several other vessels in the bay such as Pelican, suffered similarly, they were refloated. (Note: The hired armed cutter Lion (14 guns) and a Guernsey privateer were the two other vessels that were driven ashore. The schooner Redbridge and Telegraph got safely out to sea, though Telegraph had to cut away her mainmast.) Havick, however, was so badly damaged that she was abandoned as a wreck. Neither Havick nor Pelican suffered any casualties, though the crews were subject to waves breaking over them for six hours until the tide, which had risen 32 feet (9.8 m) (perpendicular), providentially receded.

In 1987 metal detectors discovered what would prove to be the site of the wreck. Excavations under the auspices of the Jersey Heritage Trust began in 1997. Much of the material recovered was metal, including musket and cannon shot, a candle snuffer, and large quantities of copper plates and nails used in the hull sheathing; some woodwork was also discovered.
