= HMS Eling =

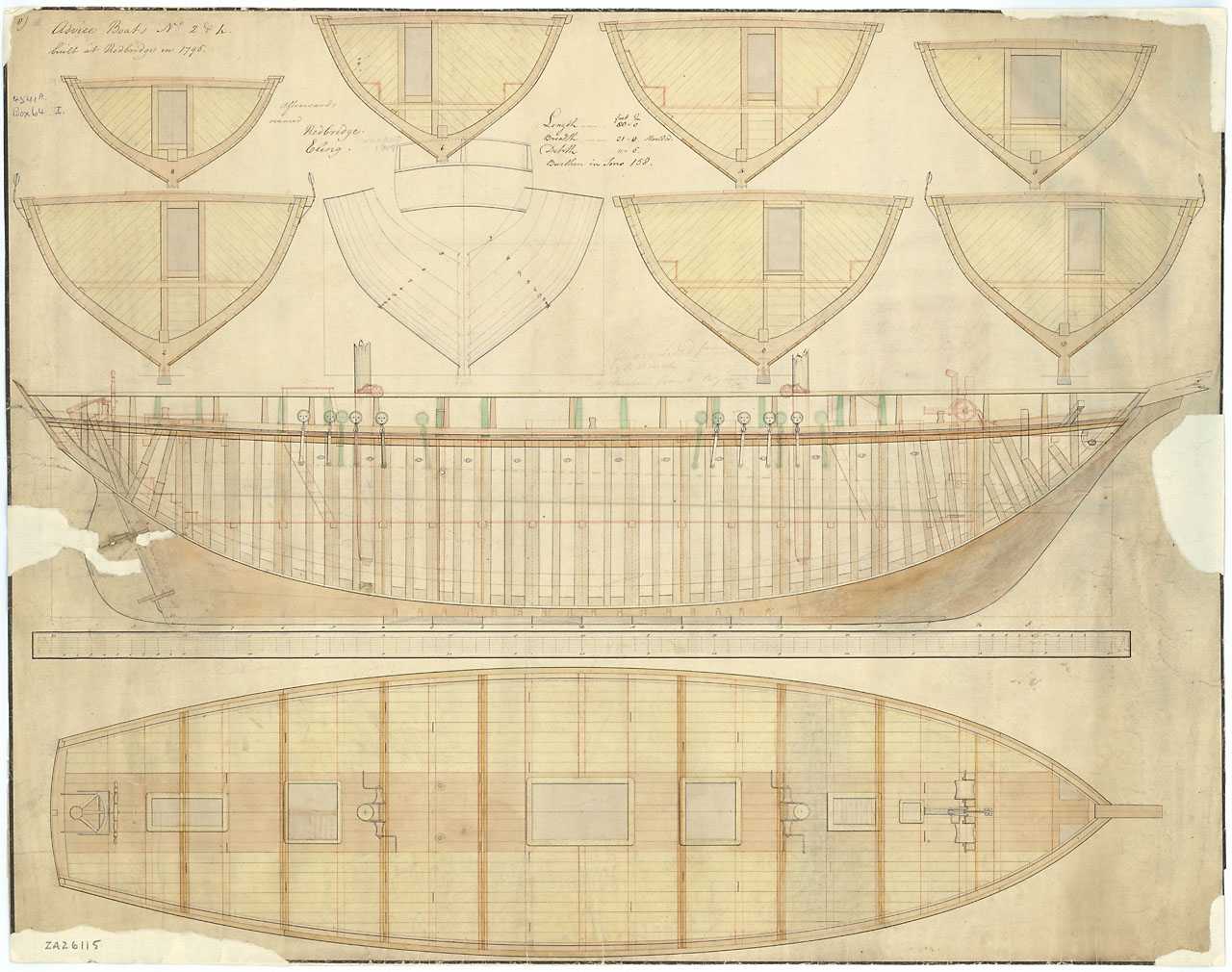
- Plans for HMS Eling, National Maritime Museum, Greenwich, London

History

Great Britain
- Name: HMS Eling
- Builder: Hobbs & Hellyer, Redbridge
- Laid down: 1796
- Acquired: 1798 by purchase
- Commissioned: July 1798
- Honours and awards: Naval General Service Medal with clasp "Copenhagen 1801"
- Fate: Broken up 1814

General characteristics
- Type: Experimental design
- Tons burthen: 148 (bm)
- Length: 80 ft 0 in (24.4 m) (overall); 56 ft 7 1/2 in (17.3 m) (keel)
- Beam: 22 ft 2 in (6.8 m)
- Depth of hold: 11 ft 6 in (3.5 m)
- Sail plan: Schooner
- Complement: 50
- Armament: 12 × 18-pounder carronades + 2 × 12-pounder carronades

HMS Eling was one of six vessels built to an experimental design by Sir Samuel Bentham. It is not known when she was launched, though it may have been in 1796. After the Admiralty purchased her in 1798 for the Royal Navy she took part in several campaigns and captured a privateer and other vessels. She was broken up in 1814 after several years in ordinary.

== Design ==
Hobbs & Hellyer built six vessels to Bentham's design. Eling was the name ship of a two-vessel class of schooners, and she and her classmate Redbridge were the smallest of the six vessels, smaller even than the other two schooners, Milbrook and Netley. The design featured a large-breadth to length ratio with structural bulkheads, and sliding keels. The vessels were also virtually double-ended.

== French Revolutionary wars ==
Lieutenant William Peake commissioned her in July 1798. Under his command, Eling took part in the Anglo-Russian invasion of Holland in 1799. On 28 August 1799, the fleet captured several Dutch hulks and ships in the New Diep, in Holland. Eling was not listed among the vessels qualifying to share in the prize money. However, Eling was present at the subsequent Vlieter Incident on 30 August. In discussing the utility of the "non-recoil principle" of fixing carronades to the deck, James mentions that during the Vlieter Incident Eling fired some 400 shots from her aftermost carronade without sustaining the slightest damage to even a pane of glass in the cabin skylight, or injury to anyone.

On 12 March 1801 Eling sailed with the British fleet under Admiral Sir Hyde Parker and was at the Battle of Copenhagen (1801). She shared in the head money for the battle, but was not listed among the vessels whose crews qualified for the clasp "Copenhagen 1801" to the Naval General Service Medal that the Admiralty issued in 1847. This is strange as prior to the battle she participated in taking soundings of the Hollander Deep, and after the battle Captain Robert Otway boarded Eling to sail to HDMS Holsteen to arrange her surrender. Though Eling does not appear on the list, members of her crew are known to have received the medal. Then on 8 June a midshipman and some crew members of Eling on shore in Copenhagen got involved in some altercation, but although it resulted in an exchange of letters between the Danish Adjutant General and Admiral Lord Nelson, nothing more seems to have come of this.

In August 1801 Eling had rejoined Suamarez who was blockading Cadiz after the Battle of Algeciras Bay. Eling had been part of a squadron cruising off Ireland that the Admiralty sent south to reinforce Saumarez.

== Napoleonic wars ==
In 1803 Eling was on the Guernsey station and under the command of Lieutenant William Archbold.

On the afternoon of 13 June Archbold encountered the French privateer lugger Espeigle some five or six leagues NNW of Cap Fréhel. Espeigle was a small, open privateer lugger with a crew of 12 men armed with small arms. She had been out of Saint-Malo for 18 days without taking anything. Eling captured Espiegle after a chase of about an hour. Eling was short-handed, being 17 men below complement, so Archbold decided to take Espeigle into port. However, as a tow rope was being passed to Espeigle, she got under Eling's bow and Eling sank her.

Between 13 and 15 September 1803 Eling joined a squadron under Rear-Admiral James Saumarez. Saumarez, in Cerberus, commanded a small squadron comprising the sloops of war Charwell and Kite, the schooner Eling, the cutter Carteret, and the bomb vessels Sulphur and Terror. The squadron massed for a bombardment of the port of Granville where there were some gunboats moored. The squadron bombarded the port several times over the next two days. On 15 September, as Cerberus was withdrawing, she grounded. For the three hours it took to refloat her nine gunboats harried her, but without effect. When the rest of the squadron, came up they drove the gunboats away. The British retired with no information on what, if anything, the bombardment had achieved.

Eling then cruised in the Channel. She suffered so much damage from the winter weather that Saumarez ordered her to return to Plymouth for a refit. Before she did so she called at Jersey and Guernsey for dispatches. She was paid off in 1804 and recommissioned.

== Fate ==
In 1807 Eling went into ordinary at Portsmouth. The Admiralty sold her there in May 1814 for breaking up.
