= Russian frigate Liogkii =

Russian frigate, later sold to the French Navy

History

Russian Empire
- Name: Liogkii ("Лёгкий"), or Legkiy or Legkii
- Builder: Solombala Shipyard, Arkhangelsk (constructed by G. Ignatyev)
- Laid down: 18 October 1800
- Launched: 7 May 1803
- Decommissioned: 20 October 1809

France
- Name: Corcyre
- Namesake: Corfu
- Acquired: By purchase
- Captured: 27 November 1811

General characteristics
- Length: 44.20 m (145.0 ft)
- Beam: 12.19 m (40.0 ft)
- Depth of hold: 4.11 m (13.5 ft)
- Propulsion: Sail
- Complement: Russian service: 280; French service:130
- Armament: Russian service; UD:26 × 24-pounder (short) guns; Spardeck: 10 × 6-pounder guns; At capture; UD: 26 × 18-pounder guns; QD:2 × 6-pounder gun

Liogkii ("Лёгкий"), or Legkiy or Legkii, was a 38-gun Russian Speshni-class frigate launched in 1803. She served in the Mediterranean during the Anglo-Russian war. The Russians sold her to the French Navy in 1809, which refitted her and put her into service in 1811, renaming her Corcyre. The British captured her in November 1811.

== Russian service ==
Legkiy was built of pine and served in the Baltic Fleet. From 1804 to 1809 she was under the command of Captain A.B. Povalishin.

Legkiy sailed to the Mediterranean in 1806 with Captain-Commodore I.A. Ignatyev's squadron. Between February and September 1807 she served with the Adriatic Squadron.

She left Corfu on 24 December, arriving at Trieste on 28 December 1807 as part of Commodore Saltanov's squadron. At Trieste, she resisted a British attack there in May 1809.

On 27 September 1809 she was ordered sold to France. She was decommissioned at Trieste on 20 October, and transferred to the French on 1 November. Her Russian crew left for Russia about a year later, on 24 October 1810.

== French service ==
The French Navy refitted Legkiy between January and March 1811, at Trieste, and renamed her Corcyre in March. She was armed en flûte.

== Fate ==
On 27 November 1811, as she sailed escorted by Uranie and the 14-gun brig Scemplone, ferrying troops and ammunition, she encountered the 74-gun ship of the line HMS Eagle about four leagues NW of Fano. Eagle finally caught Corcyre after a chase of 10 hours. Captain Sir Charles Rowley reported that the three vessels were sailing from Corfu from Trieste, having left Corfu on 13 November, and that all three were carrying wheat and stores. Corcyre alone was carrying 300 tons of wheat. She had a crew of 70 men and was carrying 130 soldiers.

Scemplone escaped early in the chase. Uranie escaped by superior sailing, the onset of darkness, and the weather, and probably was able to take refuge at Brindisi. Corcyre resisted Eagle, firing on her for a few minutes. Corcyre had already lost her foretop mast during the chase from carrying too much sail, and return fire from Eagle did further damage to Corcyre's rigging. She struck after she had lost three men killed and six or so wounded, including her captain who was lightly wounded in the head. Eagle was forced to stay close to Corcyre to prevent her running on shore near Brindisi, which by then was only a mile and a half away.

Corcyre's captain, Lieutenant Langlade, was acquitted on 16 September 1812 for the loss of his ship.
