= HMS Harpy (1796) =

Sloop of the Royal Navy

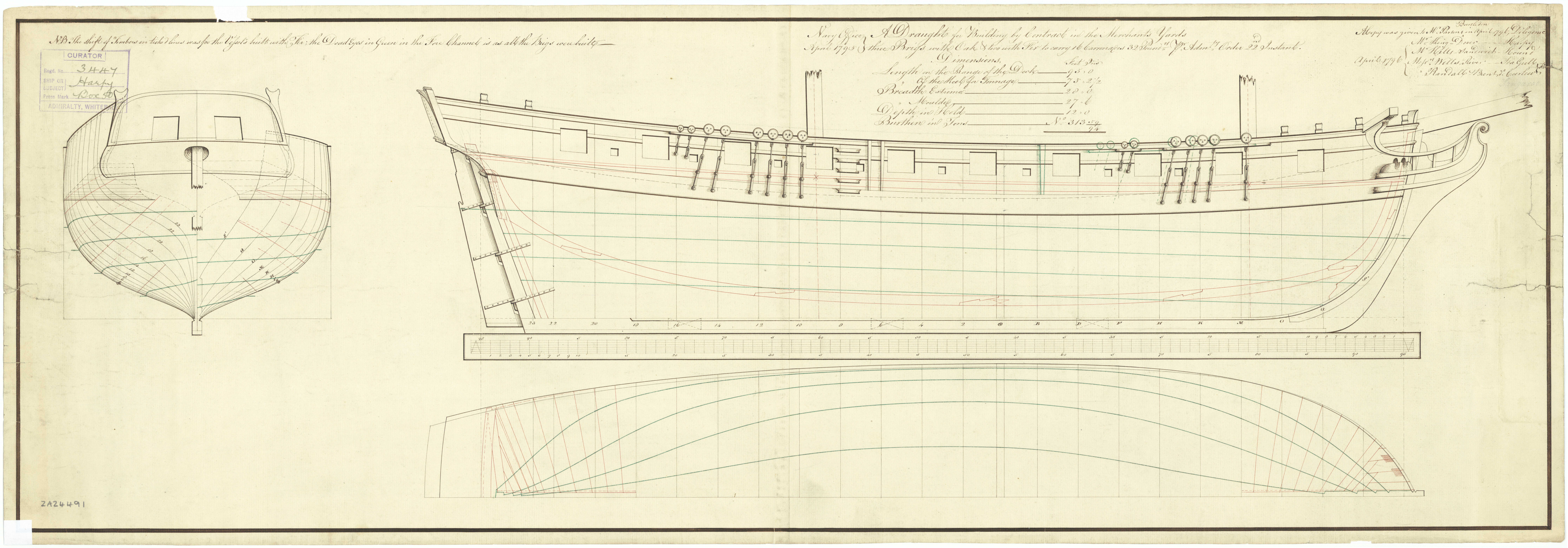
- Harpy

History

Great Britain
- Name: HMS Harpy
- Ordered: 4 & 18 March 1795
- Builder: Thomas King, Dover
- Laid down: May 1795
- Launched: February 1796
- Commissioned: 22 February to 7 May 1795
- Honours and awards: Naval General Service Medal with clasps: "Harpy"; "Copenhagen 1801"; "Java"
- Fate: Sold 1817

General characteristics
- Class & type: Diligence-class brig-sloop
- Type: 18-gun brig-sloop
- Tons burthen: 31613/94 (bm)
- Length: 95 ft 0 in (29.0 m) (gundeck); 75 ft 1 5/8 in (22.9 m) (gundeck)
- Beam: 28 ft 1 1/2 in (8.6 m)
- Depth of hold: 12 ft 0 1/2 in (3.7 m)
- Sail plan: Brig
- Complement: 121
- Armament: 16 × 32-pounder carronades; 2 × 6-pounder chase guns

HMS Harpy was a Royal Navy Diligence-class brig-sloop, launched in 1796 and sold in 1817. She was the longest lived vessel of her class, and the most widely travelled. She served in both the battle of Copenhagen and the British invasion of Java, took part in several actions, one of which won for her crew a clasp to the Naval General Service Medal, and captured numerous privateers. The Navy sold her in 1817.

== French Revolutionary Wars ==
Commander Henry Bazely commission Harpy in April 1796, for The Downs. Harpy belonged to the squadron that on 20 August captured Augustic and recaptured Nelly. Consequently Harpy was entitled to share in the prize money. (Note: A captain received £5 15s 4 3/4d; a seaman received 4d.)

On 25 December, Harpy captured Hoop, Pronck, master. Harpy was in company with the hired armed cutter Hind. Racoon also shared in the proceeds of the capture.

On 3 February 1797 Harpy was off Dungeness Point when she fell in with the hired armed cutter Lion, which was in the process of detaining a sloop that had been trailing a convoy. The sloop turned out to be the French privateer Requin, of Dieppe, which had a crew of 20 men armed with small arms. Lion was in company with hired armed cutter Dolphin.

The next day Harpy recaptured Liberty, of Newcastle, which had been a prize to Requin. Harpy took both into Portsmouth.

Also in February, Harpy captured the privateer Cotentin. On 8 May, Harpy captured the Russian hoy Leyden and Fourcoing, which was sailing with a cargo of madder, white lead, and smalt, from Rotterdam to Rouen. Harpy was in company with Beaulieu and Savage. Eight days later Harpy captured Goede Hope; Harpy was in company with the hired armed cutter Princess of Wales.

Then on 26 May Harpy recaptured Friendship. Friendship had been sailing from Southampton to Leith and Harpy took her into Dover.

A biography of Bazely reports that in May Harpy drove a French brig of eighteen 9-pounder guns and a cutter of 14 guns on shore near Dieppe. Furthermore, in connection with that action, Harpy fired on the buildings of the port, damaging several, including particularly the Customs House.

On 20 June Harpy captured the French privateer Espérance. Espérance was a rowboat, armed with 10 swivel guns and having a crew of 32 men, and the capture took place of the coast of France.

The same biography of Bazeley reports that Harpy had captured two privateers, one of four guns and the other a rowboat, and recaptured two coasting vessels. The description of the rowboat matches that of Esperance, suggesting that the privateer of four guns may have been Cotentin.

In May 1798 Harpy participated in Sir Home Riggs Popham's expedition to Ostend to destroy the sluice gates of the Ostend-Bruge Canal. Harpy led the smaller vessels that were to lie as beacons N. W. of Ostend. The expedition landed 1,300 troops under Major General Coote. The army contingent blew up the locks and gates of the canal, but due to unfavourable winds preventing re-embarkation, Coote and the men under his command were then forced to surrender.

Harpy recaptured the ship Pleaaden in October.

On 20 May 1799 Harpy and Suffisante were in sight when Savage captured the ship Johanna Maria. On 3 June Babet was in company with Harpy when they captured John. Then on 24 June they captured the ship Weloverdagt.

Early in the morning of 5 February 1800, the sloops Fairy and Harpy left Saint Aubin's Bay, where they were attached to the Jersey squadron under the command of Captain Philippe d'Auvergne, (Prince of Bouillon), and reconnoitered the coast around Saint-Malo. In late morning they were some five or six miles from Cap Fréhel when they sighted a large vessel, which turned out to be a French frigate.

The sloops were able to lure the frigate away from the coast and an action developed that lasted from 1pm to 2:45pm before the French vessel sailed away. The sloops had a lot of damage to their rigging but once this was repaired they set out in pursuit. At 4pm they encountered the British frigateLoire, the sixth-rate post ship Danae, and the ship-sloop Railleur, which joined the chase. That evening, after a close action of more than two hours, Loire succeeded in getting the 42-gun French frigate Pallas to strike. Pallas was on her maiden voyage and the Royal Navy took her into service as Pique. The next day, Danae was able to capture a French naval cutter.

The British vessels suffered some casualties. Fairy had four men killed and seven wounded, among them her captain. Harpy had one man killed and three wounded. Loire had two men killed and 17 wounded, one of them mortally. Lastly, Railleur had two men killed and four wounded. Captain James Newman Newman of Loire did not report the French casualties.

The action resulted in promotions to post captain for both Captain Joshua Sidney Horton of Fairy and for Bazely. Horton was promoted on 18 February, but Bazely was not promoted until 8 April due to some ambiguity about Harpy's role in the capture of Pallas. In 1847 the Admiralty awarded the Naval General Service medal with clasps "Fairy" and "Harpy" to the surviving claimants from the action. Captain William Birchall, of the troopship Hebe replaced Bazely on Harpy.

Two French privateers, each of 14 guns and 90 men, captured the Constitution on 9 January 1801 off the Isle of Portland. Constitution was a hired cutter of twelve 4-pounder guns and 40 men, under the command of Lieutenant W.H. Faulknor. That same evening Harpy and the revenue cutter Greyhound recaptured Constitution.

On 2 April 1801, Harpy was in Admiral Lord Nelson's division at the battle of Copenhagen. She apparently was not involved in the actual fighting as she suffered no casualties. Commander Charles Boys replaced Birchall, but shortly thereafter Harpy was paid off.

== Napoleonic Wars ==
Commander Edmund Heywood recommissioned Harpy in August 1803 for the North Sea.

On 21 October 1803 Captain Robert Honyman of Leda sighted a convoy off Boulogne of six French sloops, some armed, under the escort of a gun-brig. He sent Harpy and Lark to pursue them but the winds were uncooperative and the squadron was unable to engage. However, the hired armed cutter Admiral Mitchell was able to come up and attack the convoy. After two and a half hours of cannonading, Admiral Mitchell succeeded in driving one sloop and the brig, which was armed with twelve 32-pounder guns, on the rocks. Admiral Mitchell had one gun dismounted, suffered damage to her mast and rigging, and had five men wounded, two seriously.

Harpy intercepted a small French convoy on 12 March 1804 that was sailing from Calais to Boulogne. Harpy was able to capture two transports and their escort, a gunboat named Penriche armed with two guns, and send them into The Downs. A later report referred to Penriche as French Gun Boat No. 1. The two transports were Schuyt No. 23, and Schuyt No. 24. Harpy shared the capture with Aggressor.

In the evening of 20 July there were more than 80 French brigs and luggers in the roads of Boulogne. As the weather worsened, a number of the vessels set sail. Captain Owen of Immortalite signaled to Harpy, Bloodhound, and Archer to close with the vessels, which they did. Autumn also joined the operation. Although most of the French vessels escaped, the British were able to drive a handful on shore.

On 26 August Immortalite, Harpy, Adder, and Constitution attacked a French flotilla of 60 brigs and luggers off Cape Gris Nez. The British vessels were within range of shore batteries that fired on them. A 13" shell fell into Constitution, falling through the deck and hull without exploding. Water started coming in faster than the pumps could handle and her crew abandoned her; the other vessels in the squadron rescued them. A shell hit Harpy, also without exploding. It killed a seaman as it hit, and the crew speculated that his blood had extinguished the fuse. Another account had the shell breaking a beam, which tore out the fuse. When the shell came to rest, a seaman picked it up and plunged it into a bucket. Some shots hit Immortalite, wounding four men. The British succeeded in driving some vessels ashore, but the great bulk of the flotilla reached Boulogne. The British squadron engaged in some small skirmishes over the next two days, but without notable results.

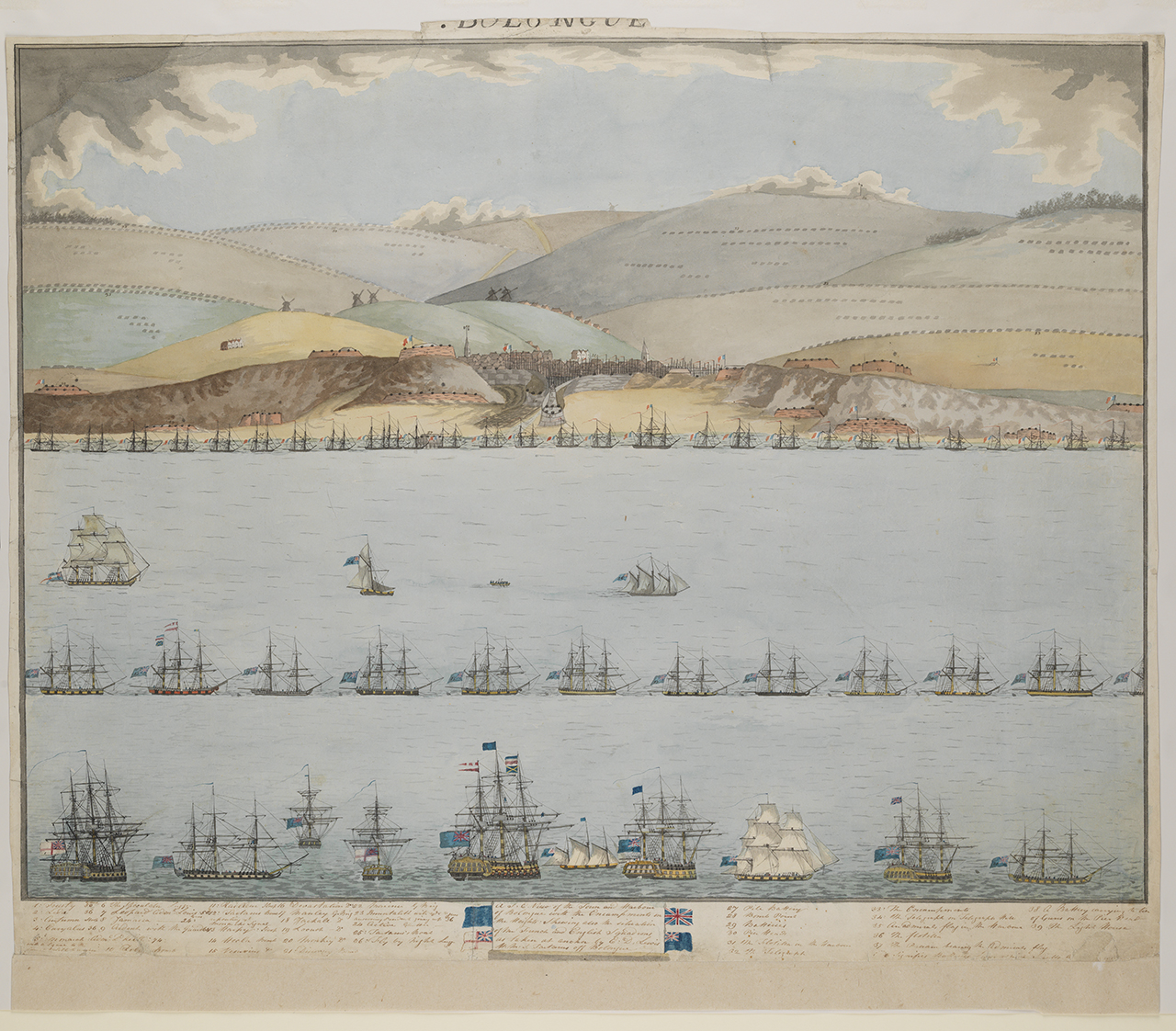
Harpy at the attack on Boulogne October 1804

On 29 January 1805 a French flotilla consisting of 17 brigs, three schooners, four sloops, a dogger, and six luggers arrived at Boulogne from the west. Immortalite exchanged fire with them but they were too close to shore to capture. One lugger lost her foremast and Harpy was able to capture her after a brief exchange of fire. Owen sent the lugger to the Downs with Bruiser. A subsequent prize money notice named the lugger as Gunboat No. 337 (or No. 317); Watchful and Immortalite shared in the capture.

Early on the morning of 24 April Gallant and Watchful sighted a flotilla of 27 vessels under Dutch colours coming around Cape Grisnez and approaching Boulogne from the east. The two brigs engaged, giving the squadron under command of Captain Robert Honyman in Leda time to join the action. Gallant received four shot between wind and water and had to sail back to Britain to effect repairs; she had no casualties. Watchful captured one of the vessels.

Honyman led the rest of his squadron, consisting of Fury, Harpy, Railleur, Bruiser, Archer, Locust, Tickler, Monkey, and Firm, in chase. After an engagement of about two hours the British succeeded in capturing seven schuyts (including the one that Watchful had captured earlier). All were from 25 to 28 tons burthen, six were armed with from two to three guns and howitzers ranging from 6 to 24-pounders, and were carrying troops from Dunkirk to Ambleteuse. Most were under the command of army officers. One, No. 3, was a transport. British casualties amounted only to one man wounded. Archer, in a separate letter, reported capturing two more schuyts similarly armed and manned. A number of other British vessels in the squadron under Admiral B. Douglas also shared in the prize money because they were part of the blockading force, even though they were not present; however, the head money for the crews of the armed schuyts accrued only to the actual captors, including Harpy.

In January 1806 Commander George Mowbray assumed command of Harpy However, she was paid-off into ordinary at Portsmouth in 1807. She then underwent some repairs between April and July 1809, with commander George Blamey recommissioning her in May.

Harpy participated in the unsuccessful Walcheren Expedition, which took place between 30 July and 19 August 1809. She was part of a squadron of smaller vessels under Sir Home Riggs Popham that pushed up the West Scheld to place buoys in the channel to guide the large ships, but saw no action. Blamey apparently also commanded a battery on shore, manned by seamen, that fired on Flushing. Prize money was paid in October 1812 to the naval vessels, customs house vessels, and Sea Fencibles.

After the evacuation of Walcheren, Harpy sailed with a convoy to Halifax, leaving on 13 May 1810. She then brought 150 troops back with her and took them to Lisbon.

In October 1810, Harpy detained and sent into Falmouth Aurora, Rohly, master, of Ostend. Blamey received promotion to post captain on 21 October. Commander Edward A'Court took command in November and sailed Harpy for the Cape of Good Hope on 2 January 1811.

Commander Henderson Bain was appointed to command Harpy on 29 March 1811 at the Cape of Good Hope. That same day, the newly promoted Lieutenant Henry Cavendish Hore joined Harpy.

Harpy then participated in the British invasion of Java commanded by Admiral Stopford. Hore received a knee wound while commanding a detachment ashore in the storming of Fort Cornelis.

Prize money for the capture of Java was payable in July 1816. (Note: Stopford and Commodore William Robert Broughton each received £7274 2s 8 1/2d. A first-class share was worth £926 17s 4 1/2d; a sixth-class share was worth £9 11s 0d.)

On 26 January 1812 Bain became acting captain of Lion. Lieutenant Henry Cavendish Hore moved with Bain to Lion as her first lieutenant. During Bain's absence, Lieutenant Samuel Hore commanded Harpy. He was Admiral Stopford's Flag Lieutenant, and Stopford appointed him to Harpy to replace Bain. On 28 January Stopford sent Hardy to Isle de France to replace Eclipse.

Harpy captured James, which was sailing from Batavia to Philadelphia; James arrived at the Cape of Good Hope on 21 January 1813. Racehorse and Harpy captured the American ship Rose on 3 February. She was carrying tea and 8907 Spanish dollars (worth approximately £2226). (Note: A first-class share of the proceeds of 121 chests and 160 boxes of tea was worth £58 8s 8d; a sixth-class share was worth £1 7s 10. A first-class share of the dollars was worth £495 16s 10d; a sixth-class share was worth £12 11s 0d.)

Bain returned to command of Harpy a few weeks before he received promotion to post captain on 6 April 1813. Commander Thomas Griffith Allen replaced Bain that month. However, he died on 26 (or 28) September 1814, at Port Louis. Command devolved on Lieutenant William Lambert, Harpy's first lieutenant. Earlier, in July, Lambert had led her boats in the rescue, at great risk, of the crew of the schooner Eugenie, which had wrecked on Sandy Island (near Mauritius) on 19 April. During the rescue the master and a seaman from Harpy drowned when their boat overturned. After Allen's death, Robert Townsend Farquhar, governor of Mauritius, wrote to Lambert, pressing on him the importance of maintaining Harpy's highly successful anti-slavery mission.

In February 1815, Commander George Tyler took command of Harpy. On 16 November 1815 Harpy captured the French schooner Jeune Victor, which was carrying 55 slaves. Victor was sailing from Madagascar to the Mauritius when Harpy captured her and sent her into the Cape of Good Hope. The account in Lloyd's List further describes Victor as having 64 slaves on board. (Note: A first-class share of the proceeds was worth £5 16s 8d; a sixth-class share was worth 2s 8 1/4.)

== Fate ==
The Commissioners of the Navy first offered Harpy for sale at Deptford on 3 April 1817. They sold her on 10 September to a Mr. Kilsby for £710.
