= Hired armed cutter Telemachus =

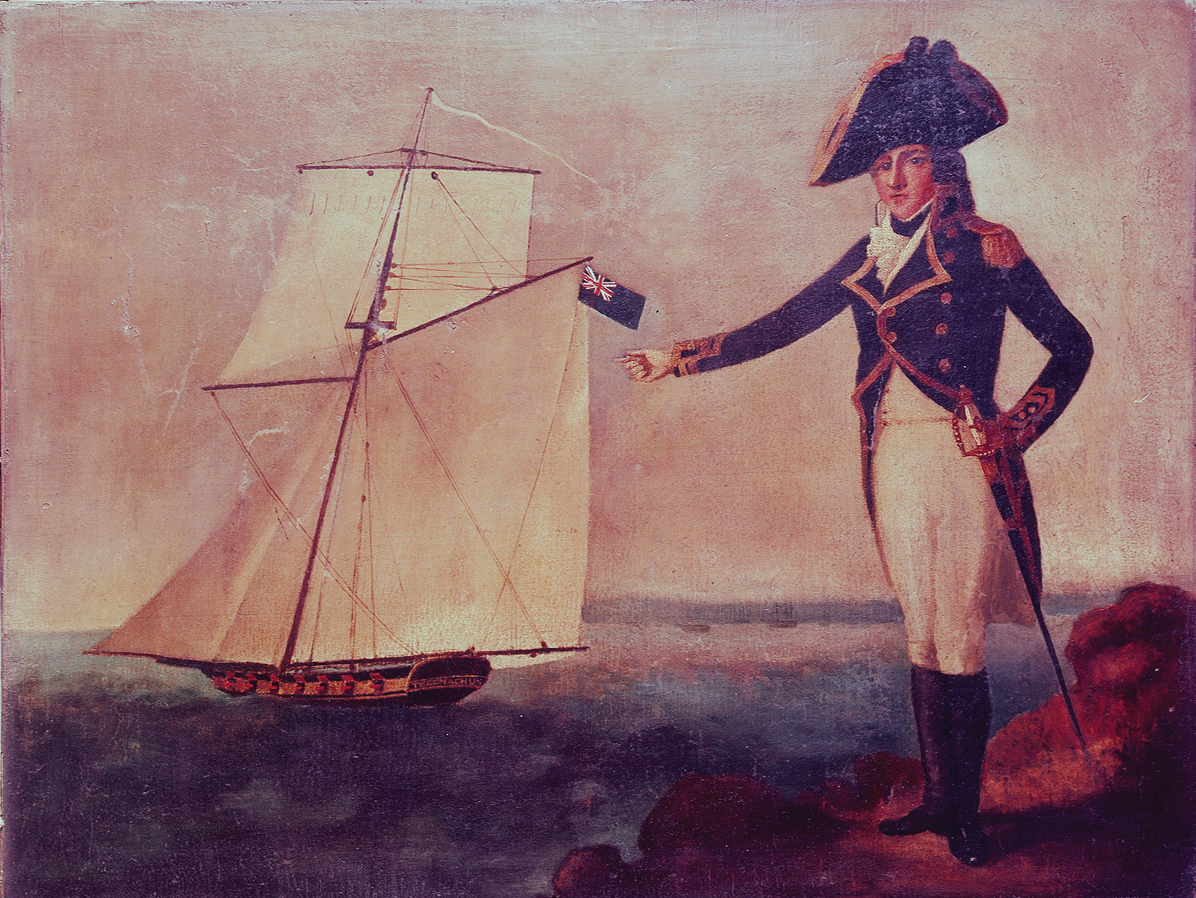
Painting c. 1797 of Commander John Crispo pointing to his former command, His Majesty's hired armed cutter Telemachus, National Maritime Museum, Greenwich.

His Majesty's hired armed cutter Telemachus served the Royal Navy from 17 June 1795 until 15 January 1801. She was of 1285/95 tons (bm), and carried fourteen 4-pounder guns. During her five and a half years of service to the Royal Navy during the French Revolutionary Wars, she captured eight French privateers and many merchant vessels.

== Naval service ==
On 5 August 1796 she was under the command of Lieutenant John Crispo when, off The Needles, she sailed in pursuit of a sloop and a cutter, which fled to the east. At 11am, Telemachus caught up and recaptured the sloop John. John, William Ayles, master, was of Weymouth and had been sailing with a cargo of coal when the enemy cutter had captured her. Crispo took charge of John and sailed in pursuit of the enemy cutter, catching up with the cutter off the Owers Bank at half-past two in the afternoon. She fired a shot, and the cutter struck. She was the French privateer Marguarita, armed with four guns and four swivels, with a crew of 40 men. She was three days out of Cherbourg, but her only capture was the John. Crispo stated that by taking Marguarita he had saved five other vessels from being captured. Lloyd's Marine List gave the privateer's name as Margaretta, and described her as being armed with six guns.

On 14 August, Telemachus captured Pomona. Pomona, Robinson, master, was an American ship that had been sailing from Bermuda to London when a French privateer lugger captured her off St Albans. Telemachus sent Pomona into Portsmouth.

Then, on 27 August, behind the Isle of Wight, Telemachus captured a small French privateer, Requin, armed with four swivels and carrying a crew of 22 men. Telemachus also captured a smuggling vessel there that same day.

Telemachus captured the Spanish ship Gertruda on 6 October 1796. This may have been the Spanish ship from "the Carracas" carrying cotton, cocoa, coffee, and indigo that Telemachus was reported later that month as having sent into Gibraltar.

In early 1797 Crispo was promoted to the rank of Commander.

Telemachus was under the command of Lieutenant Thomas Newton when she and the hired armed cutter Hind captured the privateer Mandarin on 24 February 1797. On 7 March the cutter Nimble captured the privateer Bonheur; Telemachus shared in the capture.

Telemachus recaptured the brig Prince William on 17 May 1797. Telemachus then captured the French privateer lugger Succès some five leagues from Needle Point. Succès had been armed with six carriage guns, but had thrown two overboard during the chase. She had a crew of 42 men and had sailed from La Hogue the night before. She had not taken any prizes. Telemachus sent her into Portsmouth.

On 24 July Telemachus captured the French privateer lugger Hardi, armed with four carriage guns with a crew of 30 men. She had been out of Cherbourg only about five hours and had not captured anything. (Note: Hardi was sold on 27 September 1797. She had a burthen of 1922/94 tons, had a length of 48 ft 1 in (14.7 m) and a breadth of 9 ft 8 in (2.9 m).)

Also on 24 July Telemachus recaptured two merchant brigs that had been captured by a French privateer. The day before, Telemachus had recaptured the brig Neptune and Donor.

On 6 August John, Hales, master, which Telemachus had recaptured, came into Portsmouth. The next day the French privateer Margaretta, which Telemachus had also captured, also came into Portsmouth.

On 29 September 1797, Telemachus captured the French privateer lugger Jean Bart off Portland after a five-hour chase. She was armed with eight swivel guns, had a crew of 24 men, and was three days out of Cherbourg without having captured anything.

At some point Telemachus, under the command of Lieutenant John Crup, was in company with the hired armed cuttersLion and Peggy when they captured Ledia.

On 16 March 1798, Telemachus sighted the French privateer Sophie three miles from the Berry Head. Telemachus gave chase, and after six hours caught up with her some two or three leagues north of the Casquets Light. Sophie was armed with four guns and had a crew of 20 men. She was two days out of Saint Malo but had taken nothing. Crispo further reported that when the chase started Sophie had been close to three British merchant brigs. Seagull joined the chase and was in sight when Telemachus made the capture.

On 30 April 1798, Telemachus, under the command of Lieutenant Thomas Newton, was near the Bill of Portland when she encountered and captured the French privateer lugger San Souci after a twelve-hour chase. San Souci was armed with a 12-pounder carronade and two brass 4-pounder guns, and had a crew of 27 men. She had only sailed from La Hogue the night before, had not yet captured anything.

In late 1799 and early 1800, Telemachus was among the seven vessels of a squadron that shared in the capture of four vessels:

- St Francois, taken 25 December 1799;
- St Pierre de Carnac, taken 12 January 1800;
- a brig, name unknown, taken 17 January 1800; and
- Anna Louisa, taken 22 January 1800.

Telemachus was among the vessels of a squadron that shared the proceeds of the recapture on 28 June 1800 of Lancaster. She was also part of Sir Edward Pellew's squadron, which shared in the proceeds of the capture of Vigilant, Menais, Insolent, Ann, and the wreck of a vessel that was sold, and the recapture of Industry.

Telemachus was among the innumerable vessels of Sir John Borlase Warren's squadron that shared in the capture on 30 August 1800 of the French privateer sloop of war Guêpe. She was armed with 18 guns and had a crew of 161 men. British casualties were four men killed, one drowned and 20 wounded; French casualties were 65 men killed and wounded. In 1847 the Admiralty awarded the Naval General Service Medal with clasp "29 Aug. Boat Service 1800" to all surviving claimants from the action. The award did not include Telemachus, or most of the other vessels in the squadron, but Telemachus did share in the prize money and head money. (Note: A first-class share of the prize money was worth £42 19s 6½d; a fifth-class share, that of a seaman, was worth 1s 9½d.)

On 21 July 1801, Telemachus supported the boats of Doris, Beaulieu, Uranie and Robust when they succeeded in boarding and cutting out the French naval vessel Chevrette, which was armed with 20 guns and had a crew of 350 men. Chevrette was under the batteries of the Bay of Cameret. Telemachus placed herself in the Goulet thereby preventing the French from bringing reinforcements by boat to Chevrette. The action was bloody: the British lost 11 men killed, 57 wounded, and one missing; Chevrette lost 92 officers, seamen and troops killed, including her first captain, and 62 seamen and troops wounded. In 1847 the Admiralty awarded the Naval General Service Medal with clasp "21 July Boat Service 1801" to surviving claimants from the action. The award did not include Telemachus.

== Second hired armed cutter Telemachus ==
The National Maritime Museum has a record that a hired cutter Telemachus served from 1803 to 1804. However, no other record of this vessel is readily available.
