= HMS Seagull (1795) =

Sloop of the Royal Navy

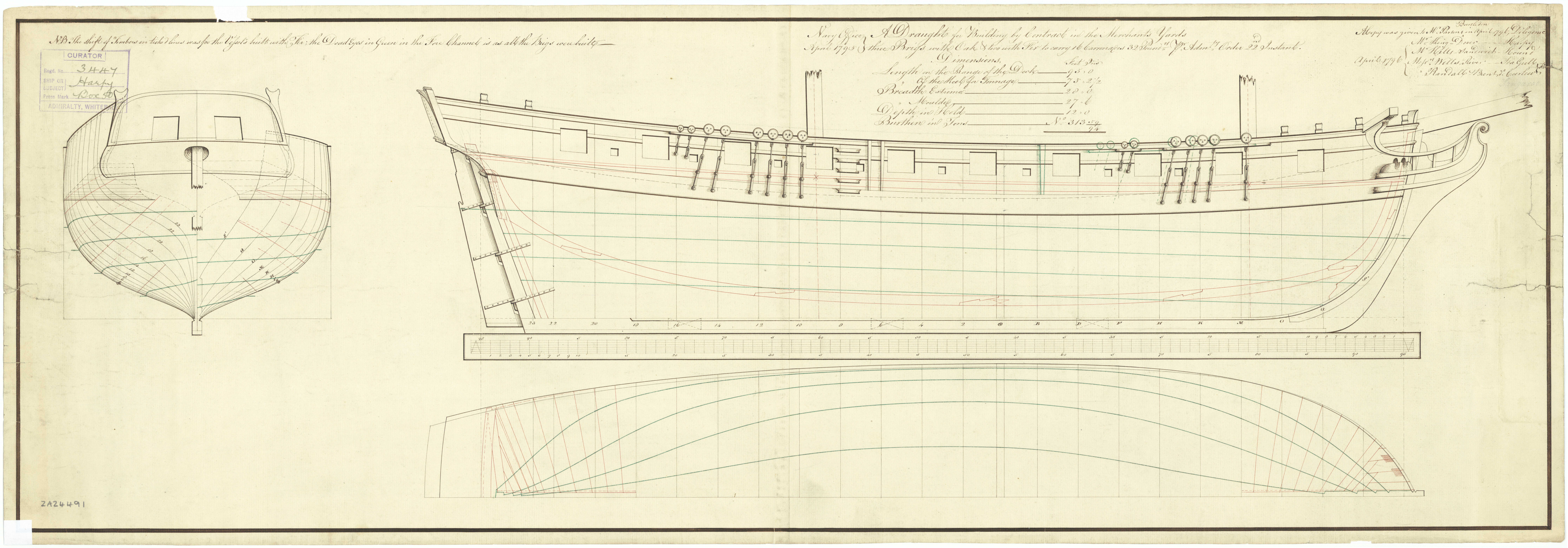
- Seagull

History

Great Britain
- Name: Seagull
- Ordered: 4 & 18 March 1795
- Builder: John & William Wells, Deptford
- Laid down: May 1795
- Launched: July 1795
- Commissioned: 8 August 1795 at the builders
- Fate: Lost February 1805

General characteristics
- Class & type: Diligence-class brig-sloop
- Type: 18-gun brig-sloop
- Tons burthen: 317 (bm)
- Length: 95 ft 3 in (29.0 m) (gundeck); 75 ft 4 in (23.0 m) (gundeck)
- Beam: 28 ft 1 1/2 in (8.6 m)
- Depth of hold: 12 ft 0 in (3.7 m)
- Sail plan: Brig
- Complement: 121
- Armament: 16 × 32-pounder carronades; 2 × 6-pounder chase guns

HMS Seagull (or Sea-Gull), was a Royal Navy Diligence-class brig-sloop, launched in 1795. During the French Revolutionary Wars she shared in the capture of a number of small French and Dutch privateers. Then early in the Napoleonic Wars she participated in a notable single-ship action before she disappeared without a trace in 1805.

== French Revolutionary Wars ==
Commander Henry Wray commissioned her in June 1795.

May 1797 saw Seagull participating in the capture of the French privateer Adolphe, together with Nautilus and the King George. King George had led the chase with Nautilus and Seagull joining in for another four hours before Nautilus succeeded in capturing Adolpe. Adolphe was pierced for 12 guns but had thrown some overboard during the chase. When the British captured her, Adolphe had five guns, eight swivels, and a crew of 35. She was new, nine days out of Boulogne on her first cruise and had not taken any prizes.

On 12 June Nautilus and the hired armed cutter Fox captured two privateers off Flakkery, Norway. The Dutch privateer lugger Brutal, of six guns and 32 men, and the French privateer cutter Syren (or Serene), of six guns and 27 men, were cruising, awaiting the homeward bound Baltic convoy. Nautilus and Fox captured the privateers after a chase of ten hours. Seagull and King George shared in the prize money.

On 2 July Seagull, Nautilus, King George, and Fox captured the Dutch privateer Klyne Sperwer. Klyne Sperwer was armed with six 3-pounder guns, swivel guns, muskets, and the like. She had a crew of 28 men, 20 of whom escaped in boats. She had been out a month from Amsterdam but had taken nothing.

Three weeks later, on 23 July, after a three-hour chase, King George and Seagull captured the French privateer Captain Thurot near Christiansand. Captaine Thurot was a small French privateer cutter armed with two brass 6-pounders and four swivels, and had a crew of 22. She had already captured the ship Tom, of Liverpool, from Riga, with timber, and the brig Bachelor, of Saltcoats in Scotland. Nautilus shared the prize money with Seagull by a private agreement.

On 16 March 1798, the hired armed cutterTelemachus sighted the French privateer Sophie three miles from the Berry Head. Telemachus gave chase and after six hours caught up with her some two or three leagues north of the Casquets Light. Sophie was armed with four guns and had a crew of 20 men. She was two days out of Saint Malo but had taken nothing; however, when the chase started, Sophie was close to three British merchant brigs. Seagull joined the chase and was in sight when Telemachus made the capture.

Seagull, Eurydice, and Hyaena shared in the recapture on 14 August of the Venus.

On 18 March 1799 the hired armed brig Telegraph captured the French privateer Hirondelle (Swallow) in a notable action. Seagull shared in the prize money, suggesting that she was in sight. That same day Seagull and Seine recaptured the sloop Industry. Hirondelle had captured two vessels, one of which was an unnamed cutter that had been sailing from Jersey to Bristol; Seagull recaptured the cutter. It is possible that the cutter was Industry.

In 1800 Commander Thomas Lavie replaced Wray. Commander John Wainright replaced Lavie in January 1801, only to be himself replaced in February by Commander Alexander Burrowes. Commander Henry Burke took command in June 1802.

== Napoleonic Wars ==
On 30 May 1803 Seagull captured the French brig Favorie. Favorie was sailing from Tobago to Dunkirk; Seagull sent her into Plymouth.

The East Indiaman Lord Nelson was on her return voyage when on 14 August she encountered the three-masted French privateer Bellone off Cape Clear, Ireland. Bellone captured Lord Nelson and put a prize crew of 41 men on board under the command of Lieutenant Fougie. On 20 August Bellone and Lord Nelson separated. Seagull had escorted a convoy from Plymouth to Cork and on her way back at around 1pm on 26 August, Burke sighted a large vessel and immediately set out in pursuit. After a chase of five hours Burke was able to bring his quarry to action in an engagement that lasted throughout the night. At daylight, Lord Nelson having expended all her cartridges, Fougie later informed Burke that on Seagull's next approach Lord Nelson would have struck her colours. However, Burke had to pull back to repair extensive damage to Seagull's mast and rigging, and two shot holes between wind and water, i.e., just below her water line. While Seagull was undertaking her repairs Fougie’s crew were able to prepare new cartridges and might have resumed the engagement when Seagull approached again. However, in the interim a squadron under Sir Edward Pellew in Tonnant came into sight, with Colossus leading. Seagull signaled to the approaching vessels and as they came up, Fougie struck to Colossus. In the fight Seagull had had two men killed and eight men wounded, one of whom apparently died later. French casualties were unreported. Pellew then gave Seagull the honour of escorting Lord Nelson back to Plymouth, where they arrived on 14 September and where Seagull could undergo much necessary repairs and refitting.

== Loss ==
In February 1805 Seagull disappeared in the English Channel. She was presumed to have foundered with the loss of her entire crew.
