= HMS Cerberus (1794) =

Royal Navy frigate

- Ceberus

History

Great Britain
- Name: HMS Cerberus
- Builder: Adams, Bucklers Hard
- Launched: September 1794
- Honours and awards: Naval General Service Medal with clasps: "25 July Boat Service 1809"; "Lissa"
- Fate: Sold on 29 September 1814

General characteristics as built
- Class & type: 32-gun fifth-rate frigate
- Tons burthen: 8061/94 (bm)
- Length: Gundeck: 135 ft (41.1 m); Keel: 112 ft 2 3/8 in (34.2 m)
- Beam: 36 ft (11.0 m)
- Depth of hold: 12 ft (3.7 m)
- Sail plan: Full-rigged ship
- Complement: 241 men; 254 after 1796
- Armament: Upper deck: 26 × 18-pounder guns; QD: 4 × 6-pounder guns + 4 × 24-pounder carronades; Fc: 2 × 6-pounder guns + 2 × 24-pounder carronades

HMS Cerberus was a 32-gun fifth-rate frigate of the Royal Navy. She served in the French Revolutionary and the Napoleonic Wars in the Channel, the Mediterranean, the Adriatic, and even briefly in the Baltic against the Russians. She participated in one boat action that won for her crew a clasp to the Naval General Service Medal (NGSM). She also captured many privateers and merchant vessels. Her biggest battle was the Battle of Lissa, which won for her crew another clasp to the NGSM. She was sold in 1814.

== French Revolutionary Wars ==
Cerberus was launched in September 1794 by Henry Adams, of Bucklers Hard. Her first commander was Captain J. Drew, who took command of her in January 1795 for the Irish station. On 29 March 1795 she was sailing with Santa Margarita when the two engaged and captured the 18-gun Jean Bart in the English Channel. The Royal Navy subsequently took the Jean Bart into service as Arab. Among the ships that shared in the prize money for the recapture of the ship Caldicot Castle and Jean Bart on 28 and 30 March were Astraea, London, Colossus, Robust, Hannibal, Valiant, Thalia, Cerberus and Santa Margarita.

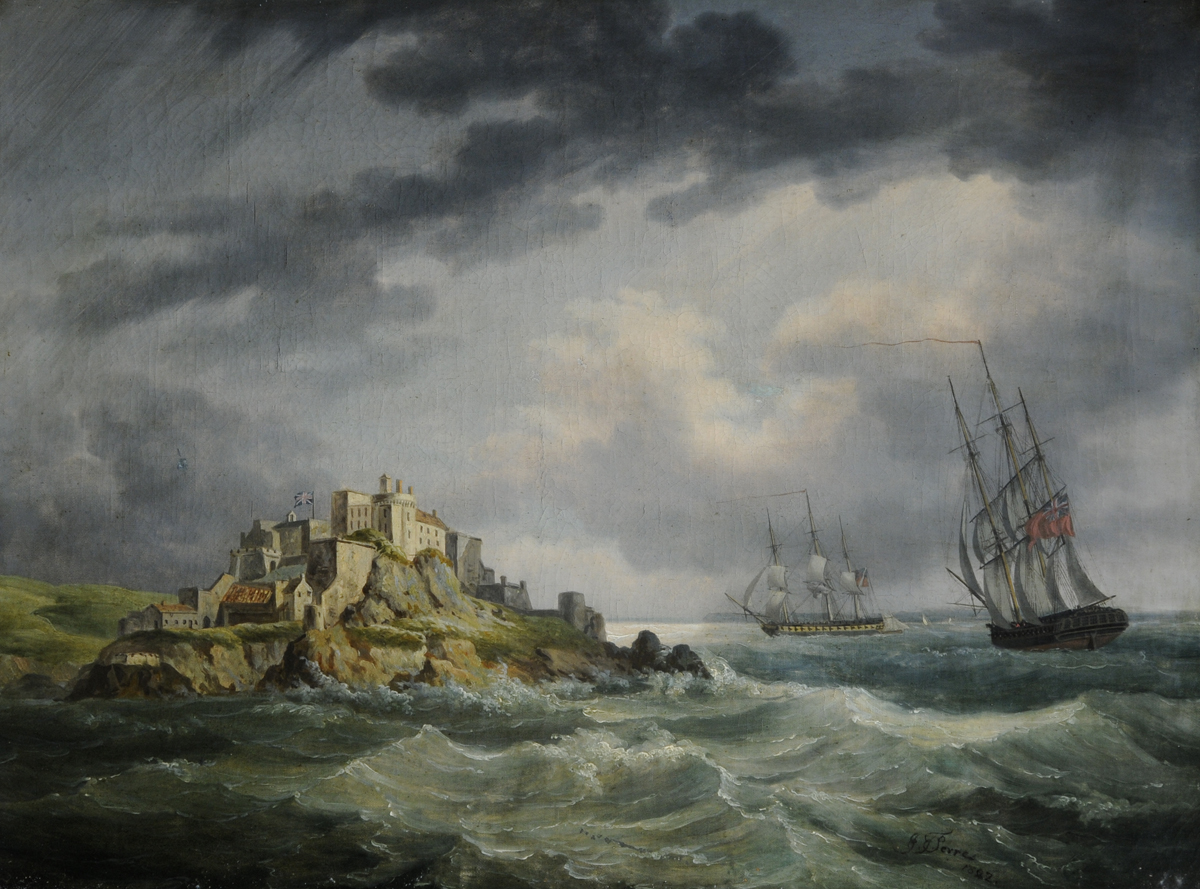
HMS Seahorse and Cerebus off Mont Orgueil in 1796

In July 1796, Cerberus and Seahorse took the privateer cutter Calvados (or Salvados). Calvados carried six guns and ten swivels, and had a crew of 38 men. She was ten days out of Brest, France, but had not made any captures. Joined by Diana, Cerberus and Seahorse captured the 14-gun privateer Indemnité on 28 August. Indemnité, of Boulogne, was pierced for 14 guns but carried ten. She had a crew of 68 men. On 14 September 1796, Cerberus, Seahorse and Diana captured the Brazilian ship Santa Cruz. Also in September, Cerberus captured the French privateer cutter Didon. Didon was armed with four brass 4-pounder guns, swivels and small arms. She had a crew of 30 men and was nine days out of Greville, having taken nothing.

Cerberus, in company with Magnanime and Diana, chased the privateer brig Franklin into the hands of Sir John Borlase Warren's squadron on 1 November. Franklin carried twelve 9-pounder guns and a crew of 80 men. On 4 November Cerberus recaptured the ship Friendship, from Cape of Good Hope. On 5 November, Cerberus took the privateer cutter Hirondelle (ex-Sans Culotte). Hirondelle was armed with ten 6-pounder guns of which she had thrown six overboard during the chase, and had a crew of 63 men. The next day Cerberus recaptured the Jackson Junior, from Jamaica. Hirondelle, Franklin (or Franklyn) and three privateers that Santa Margarita and Dryad had captured had formed a small squadron that had left Brest to scour the English Channel.

On 11 May 1797, Cerberus was on her way back to Cork from convoying vessels towards Newfoundland and the West Indies when she captured the French privateer Dungerquoise. Dunkerquoise had been armed with eighteen 9-pounder guns but had thrown most overboard while Cerberus chased her. Dunquerquoise also had a crew of 100 men. Cerberus was in company with Diana, when Diana took the cutter Neptune on 12 September after a nine-hour chase. Neptune was armed with 12 guns and had a crew of 55 men. She was three days out of Lorient and had taken no prizes. Five days later, Cerberus and Diana recaptured the Albion. Then on 27 September, Cerberus brought into Cork the Spanish privateer schooner San Noberta. San Norberta was armed with four carriage guns plus some swivels, and had a crew of 42 men. Cerberus also recaptured the Danish ship Graff Bernstorff, which was carrying a cargo of iron and grain from St. Michael's to Lisbon. Cerberus shared in the prize money with Diana and Kangaroo.

Cerberus was on the Irish station when on 12 and 14 November 1797 she captured two French privateers, the Epervier and the Renard. Both vessels were pierced for 20 guns, were copper-bottomed, quite new, and fast sailers. Epervier was armed with sixteen 4-pounder guns and had a crew of 145 men. Renard carried eighteen 6-pounders and had a crew of 189 men. Lloyd's List reported Cerberus's capture of two privateers, one of 30 guns and one of 18, and the arrival of both at Cork. The Royal Navy took both into service, though it never actually commissioned Epervier, which was listed as Epervoir. Renard retained her name unchanged.

Between these two captures, Cerberus recaptured the Adelphi, prize to Epervier. Adelphi, Patterson, master, had been sailing from Quebec to London when Epervier captured her; she too went into Cork. During this time, Cerberus also chased the privateer Buonaparte but failed to capture the French ship after Cerberus's studding sails and top gallant mast were carried away. Buonaparte was armed with 32 guns and had a crew of 250 men. Apparently, in order to escape Cerberus, Buonaparte threw many of her guns and stores overboard, necessitating her return to Bordeaux. On 11 January 1798 Captain Drew, his nephew Lieutenant James Drew, Captain John Pulling and some ten men in Cerberus's pinnace drowned in a boat accident in Plymouth. Captain James Macnamara (or M'Namara) replaced Drew. On 24 October, Cerberus and Diana captured Duntzfelt. About seven weeks later, on 10 December Cerberus recaptured General Woolf (or General Wolff).

In July 1799 Cerberus recaptured Philanthropist. On 28 September, Cerberus captured the French letter of marque Echange. Echange was pierced for 14 guns but carried only 10. She and her crew of 40 men were six days out of Bordeaux and she was sailing to San Domingo with a cargo of bale goods and wine. On 8 October Cerberus captured the French schooner Esperance. Next day, Cerberus was among the many British ships that shared in the proceeds of the capture of Nostra Senora de la Solidad. Seven days later, Arethusa and Cerberus captured Purissima Conceptione.

On 20 October, Cerberus encountered a Spanish convoy some eight or nine leagues off Cape Ortegal. The convoy comprised some 80 vessels escorted by four frigates and two brig-corvettes. At one time or another Cerberus engaged all the frigates, including firing from both broadsides at the same time. Outnumbered, Cerberus eventually withdrew, but not before she had captured and set fire to a brig from the convoy. Despite the often close action, Cerberus suffered only four men wounded. In July 1800, Cerberus recaptured Active. On 13 September 1801, Cerberus sailed for Cowes to take troop from there to Jersey. She then was to proceed to Ireland.

== Napoleonic Wars ==
Captain William Selby took command of Cerberus in April 1803. On 13 August Cerberus's boats made an attack on Concalle Bay. There they captured a large fishing boat but had to abandon a sloop they had captured after she grounded. At Cas Bay another cutting out party captured seven fishing boats of 16-18 tons burthen each. As the prize crews brought the boats to Guernsey one was upset, drowning two crew men from Cerberus.

On 13 September Cerberus served as flagship to Admiral Sir James Saumarez. Saumarez commanded a small squadron comprising the sloops of war Charwell and Kite, the schooner Eling, the cutter Carteret, and the bomb vessels Sulphur and Terror. The squadron massed for a bombardment of the port of Granville where there were some gunboats moored. The squadron bombarded the port several times over the next two days. On 15 September, as Cerberus was withdrawing, she grounded. For the three hours it took to refloat her nine gunboats harried her, but without effect. When the rest of the squadron, came up they drove the gunboats away. The British retired with no information on what, if anything, the bombardment had achieved.

Cerberus was assigned to operate of the English and French coasts by 1804 and sailed from the Guernsey Roads on the afternoon of 25 January 1804. She passed through the Little Russel and headed towards Cape la Hogue to reach and reconnoiter Cherbourg before nightfall.

As she neared the Cape, lookouts sighted a convoy of four armed vessels sailing eastwards. The vessels then anchored, while the strong tides prevented Cerberus from closing them. Captain Selby sailed slightly to the south until darkness fell. The enemy force was then sighted sailing around the cape, close in shore. Cerberus shadowed them until a squall drove them off the land and allowed Cerberus to engage them.

The British captured the French gun-vessel Chameau, and drove another vessel onto the rocks. The other two French vessels escaped. Chameau was armed with four long 6-pounders and two swivels. She was under the command of ensigne Francis Gabiare, and carried a crew of 37 plus 21 armed soldiers. (Note: The London Gazette letter describes Chameau as a new vessel of 300 tons. Actually, she had been launched on 23 May 1795 and may have had a burthen of 200 tons (bm). The Royal Navy did not take her into service.) (Note: A captain's share of the prize money for the Chameau was £169 15s 4 1/2d; a seaman's share was 17s 3 1/4d.) Head money for the unknown vessel was paid in May 1824. (Note: A first-class share was worth £81 15s 5 1/4d; a fifth-class share, that of a seaman, was worth 5s 6 3/4d)

=== Action against privateers ===
Cerberus was later involved in another engagement, this time on 2 April 1805 off Madeira. A strange sail was spotted at daylight and Cerberus gave chase, eventually overhauling and capturing her quarry. The vessel was the privateer brig Bonheur, of 114 tons. She was armed with 14 guns and had a crew of 46 men under the command of Francis Folliott. She had sailed 13 days earlier from Cherbourg but during her cruise she had only managed to make a single capture. (Note: The prize money for an able seaman was 8s 5 1/4d.)

At some point Cerberus was under the temporary command of Lieutenant Baker while Selby was absent. Baker felt indisposed and went ashore at Guernsey where he died a few hours later.

Cerberus continued to serve in the Atlantic, escorting convoys to the West Indies. On 15 May 1806, while she was escorting one such convoy, dawn revealed a suspicious vessel hovering near the fleet. Selby gave chase and after a six-hour pursuit captured the Aimable Theresa. She was armed with two brass howitzers and had a crew of 18 men. She was carrying a cargo of wine and merchandise, and had left Santiago de Cuba three days previously.

=== In the West Indies ===
By December 1806 Cerberus was in the West Indies, and in company with Circe was reconnoitering the ports of Guadeloupe and Îles des Saintes. They found little of interest, except a 16-gun brig at Îles des Saintes. Selby left Circe, under Captain Pigot to watch her, whilst he took Cerberus on a cruise.

On 2 January, as Cerberus was sailing between Martinique and Dominique lookouts sighted a privateer schooner, with a schooner and a sloop standing nearby. The three ships were heading for St. Pierre. Cerberus gave chase, cutting them off from the port and forcing them to anchor close to shore, under cover of a battery near the Pearl Rock.

A cutting out party, under Lieutenants Coote and Bligh was formed, including Mr Hall, master's mate, Mr Sayer, Mr Carlwis and Mr Selby, midshipmen, Mr Collins, boatswain and Messers Horopka and Ratcove, two Russian gentlemen acting as midshipmen. They took Cerberus's boats in under heavy cannon and small arms fire; they boarded the schooner and sloop and brought them out. The privateer schooner escaped in the darkness by using her sweeps. Though the attack was successful, Lieutenant Coote was blinded and a musket ball hit George Sayer in the leg. Two men were killed, and eight more were wounded, one of whom died later. The vessels captured or recaptured may have been a schooner of unknown name and the cutter Sally for which prize money was paid in September 1809. (Note: A seaman's share of the prize money was 11s 6d.)

Cerberus remained in the West Indies through 1807 and into 1808. In April 1807 she was part of a squadron under the command of Admiral, the Honourable Sir Alexander Cochrane, that captured the Telemaco. (Note: A seaman's share of the prize money was 2s 9d.)

In September and October Cerberus captured several Danish vessels. On 30 September she captured the schooner Sylenus. On 6 October Cerberus captured the Danish ship Resolution. Cygnet assisted at the capture. (Note: The prize money for a seaman from Cerberus was £3 6s 16 1/4d, while the prize money for a seaman from Cygnet was £3 4s 11 1/2d. In both cases the prize money probably represented well over a month's wages.) That same day, Cerberus and Cygnet also captured Fanny. (Note: The prize money for a seaman was 1s 2 3/4d.)

Next day, Cerberus captured the sloop (or galliot) Mary. On 23 October she captured the schooner Johanna Frederica. The brig Hart assisted at the capture of Mary. (Note: The prize money for a seaman for Sylenus, Mary, and Johanna Frederica was, in order, 6s 8 1/2d, 2s 10 1/4d and 10 1/4d. A second payment for Mary amounted to 3s 11 1/2d. In all, the amount probably amounted to little more than a week's wages.) On 20 October, Latona, Circe, Galatea, Cerberus, Cygnet, Pert, and Hart shared in the capture of the Danish schooner Danske Patriot. (Note: A seaman's share of the prize money was 1s 2 3/4d.) The vessels shared His Majesty's grant for the capture as members of a squadron as on 16 October Pert had already been lost in a storm.

Then on 31 October Cerberus captured the schooner Nancy. Nancy was carrying a cargo of enslaved Senegalese Africans in the waters of the British Virgin Islands. (Note: See: Slavery in the British Virgin Islands.)

In December Cerberus was part of the squadron under Admiral Sir Alexander Cochrane that captured the Danish islands of St Thomas on 22 December and Santa Cruz on 25 December. The Danes did not resist and the invasion was bloodless.

In early 1808 Captain Selby was the commander of the blockading squadron covering Pointe-à-Pitre, Guadeloupe. He realized that the French privateers were using the batteries on Marie-Galante to shelter themselves and their prizes and decided to remedy the situation. He sent Pigot with 200 seamen and marines from Cerberus, Circe, and Camilla to capture the island. Pigot landed his force early on 2 March some two miles from Grand Bourg and the garrison duly capitulated. The British also captured a number of cannons and some small arms. In 1825 Ulysses shared in the prize money with the other three vessels. (Note: A first-class share was worth £311 0s 5d; a fifth-class share was worth £1 13s 3 3/4d.)

Cerberus remained in the area, and on 29 March and in company with Lilly, Pelican, Express, Swinger, and Mosambique, sailed from Marie-Galante to attack the island of La Désirade. They arrived on 30 March and sent in a landing party of seamen and marines from the vessels of the squadron, all under the overall command of Captain Sherriff of Lily. As the boats approached they exchanged fire with a battery of 9-pounder guns covering the entrance to the harbour. The ships' guns silenced the battery and the French surrendered.

=== The Baltic ===
Cerberus then returned to England and was paid off at Deptford later in 1808. (Note: Captain Selby took command of Owen Glendower in February 1809 and died aboard her whilst at the Cape of Good Hope on 28 March 1811.) Between August and 1808 and March 1809, Cerberus underwent a substantial repair and fitting at Deptford.

Cerberus was recommissioned in March 1809 under the command of Captain Henry Whitby. She then sailed to the Baltic, where she participated in the Anglo-Russian War.

Thus on 25 July 17 boats from a British squadron, consisting of Cerberus, Princess Caroline, Minotaur and Prometheus attacked a flotilla of four enemy gunboats and a brig off Aspö Head near Fredrickshamn (present-day Hamina, Finland), in the Grand Duchy of Finland, Russia. Captain Forrest of Prometheus commanded the boats and succeeded in capturing gunboats Nos. 62, 65, and 66, and the transport brig No. 11. The action was sanguinary in that the British lost 19 men killed and 51 wounded, and the Russians lost 28 men killed and 59 wounded. Lieutenant Simpson commanded the Cerberus's boats, which had five seamen and two marines wounded in the operation. In 1847 the Admiralty issued the NGSM with clasp "25 July Boat Service 1809" to surviving claimants from the action. Cerberus then moved to the Mediterranean in 1810.

The day before the boats of the squadron also captured Ruffian schooner Waffer. The Russian transport brig the boats captured on 25 July appears to have been Nicholas Murioff.

=== The Mediterranean ===
On 14 June 1810 Cerberus was cruising in the Mediterranean in company with Active and Swallow. Together, the three British vessels captured three French gun-boats: Vincentina, Modanese, and Elvetica (or Elvetria).

Then on 28 June 1810 Amphion intercepted a convoy from Trieste and chased it into Grao. Amphion and Cerberus sent a number of boats into the harbour and after a brief struggle, captured the town, taking a number of French soldiers prisoner and discovering 25 vessels in the harbour. Boats from Active reinforced the shore parties, enabling them repel, at bayonet point, a counterattack by more French troops. On the evening of 29 June, the British sailed five prizes and a number of prisoners out of the harbour and on to Lissa. The British burnt 11 vessels in the river, and 14 or 15 boats after removing their cargoes. The British had four men killed and eight wounded, with five of the wounded being from Cerberus; the French lost 10 men killed and eight men wounded.

Prize taking continued the following year when Captain Whitby discovered four vessels anchored at Pestichi on 4 February 1811. He dispatched a number of barges from Cerberus and Active to capture them. The British took three trabaccolos, one the Carlo Grimaldi, and sent them off to Lissa, whilst burning a fourth after removing its cargo to Active. In the action Active had one seaman badly wounded.

On 12 February boats from Cerberus and Active set out to secure a number of vessels spotted moored at Ortano. As the boats attempted this, they came under heavy fire from shore positions but cleared all opposition. A party of marines and small arms men under the command of Active's lieutenant of marines landed to secure the shore to protect the cutting out operation. The carronades on Active's launches also provided cover. British casualties amounted to four men wounded. The British captured 11 Venetian vessels in all, most of which were from Ancona, bound for Corfu. The ones the British didn't burn they sent to Lissa.

- trabaccolo Eugenie, armed with six guns and under the command of a lieutenant;
- transport Fortunée, No. 52, burnt after the transfer of her cargo of corn to another transport;
- transport, name unknown, carrying oil:
- transport, name unknown, No. 2, carrying plank and corn;
- transport St. Anongiato, carrying hemp and cordage;
- transport, name unknown, No. 50, carrying wheat;
- transport, name unknown, No. 55, partly laden with sundries;
- transport Anime del Purgatorio, cargo of rice transferred and vessel burnt;
- transport, name unknown, carrying wheat.
- two transports, names unknown, burnt in the port, together with two magazines of oil, soldiers'

clothing, ammunition and naval stores, including cables, blocks, hawsers, hemp, etc.

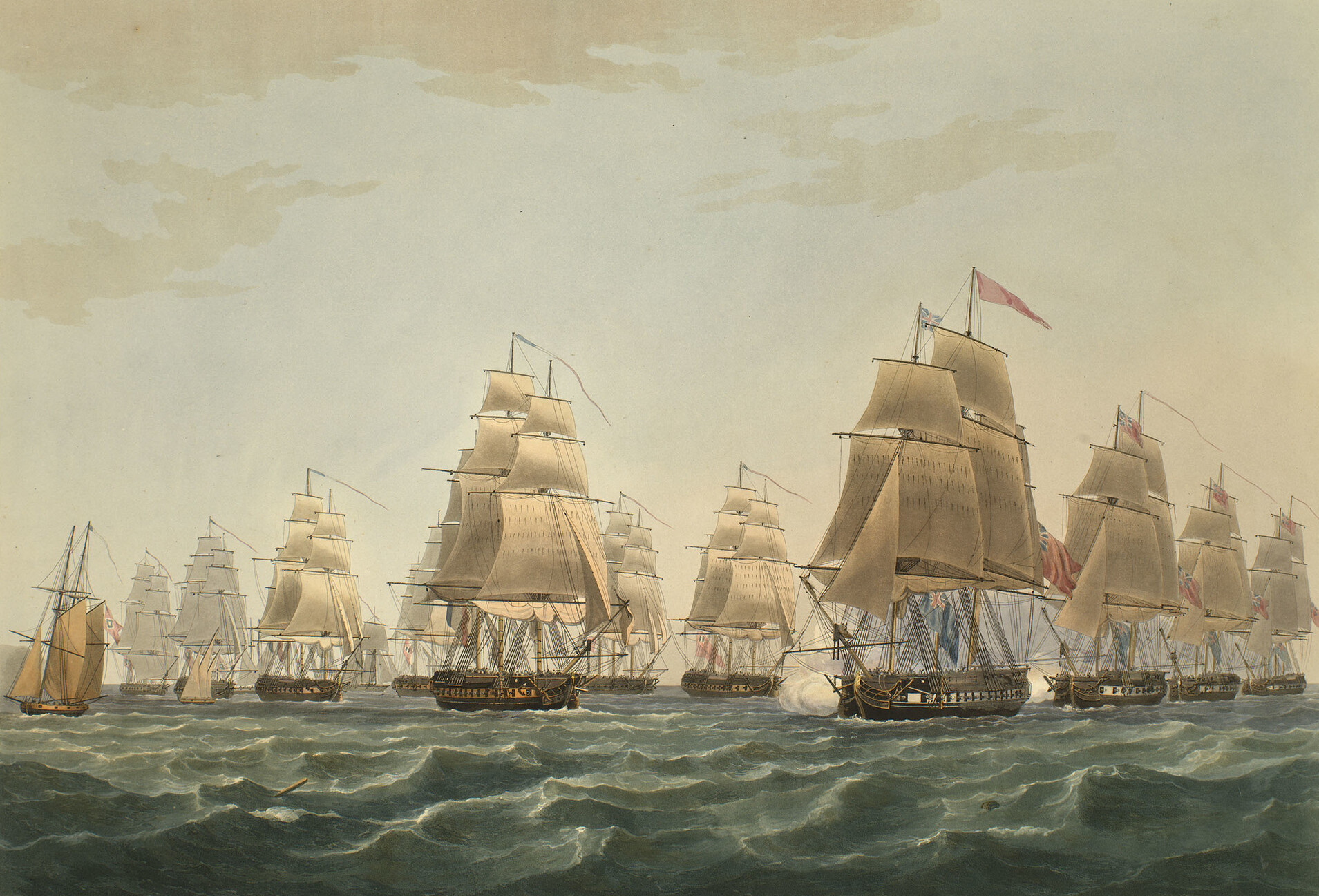
Cerberus (third from right) at the Battle of Lissa on 13 March 1811

On 13 March, Cerberus, along with Active, Volage and Amphion engaged an enemy force consisting of five frigates, a corvette, a brig, two schooners and a xebec in what became known as the Battle of Lissa. The result was a British victory with the capture of two French ships and the burning of another. However, the British lost 50 men killed and 150 men wounded. Cerberus alone lost 13 killed and 44 wounded. In 1847 the Admiralty authorized the issuance of the NGSM with clasp "Lissa" to all surviving claimants form the action.

Cerberus came under the command of Captain Robert Clephane in June 1811. Command then passed to Captain Thomas Garth in December.

On 16 June 1812 boats from HMS Unite, Orlando, and Cerberus captured three vessels of from eighty to one hundred tons in the small port of Badisea, near Otranto. A little over a month later, on 17 July, boats from Achille and Cerberus captured or destroyed, off Venice, 12 enemy trabaccolos.

On 29 January 1813, boats from Cerberus captured a trabaccolo of two guns, sailing to Corfu, heavily laden with a cargo of corn and flour. This was probably the Madonna della Grazzia, captured on that day and for which Cerberus received prize money a little over 25 years later.

Then on 13 March, she took the French galiot Veloce, which was armed with one 18-pounder and which had a crew of 22 men, under the command of officier de flottile Martinenq. She was sailing with money for the troops at Corfu. Lastly, the boats brought out a large trabaccolo from under a battery near Brindisi.

On 27 February, Cerberus and Achille were in company when they captured the brig Centauro. (Note: A first class share for Achille was worth £123 7s 10 1/4d and a first-class share for Cerberus was worth £126 12s 11 1/4d. The sixth-class shares, those of an ordinary seaman, were worth 16s 7 1/4d and 16s 0 1/2d.)

On 19 March, boats from Cerberus and Apollo destroyed several vessels, a battery and a tower three miles northwest of the port of Monopoli near Bari. Then on 11 April, Apollo and Cerberus took Devil's Island, near the north entrance to Corfu, and thereby captured a brig and a trabaccolo bringing in grain. On 14 April the boats chased a vessel into Merlera. They then suffered three men wounded before Apollo arrived and helped them capture the island. There they found eight vessels with cargoes of flour and grain, but scuttled.

On 17 May boats from Apollo and Cerberus took a vessel that ran aground near Brindisi. She was armed with a 9-pounder gun in the bow and a swivel gun. She was sailing from Otranto to Ancona. The next day the boats also brought off a gun from a Martello tower a little further to the south. Then ten days later the boats captured three gunboats at Fano that were protecting a convoy. The gun-boats each had a 9-pounder in their bows and two 4-pounder guns abaft. They were under the command of an Ufficiale di Vascello, carrying troops for Corfu. The British also captured four vessels from the convoy. British losses amounted to two men killed and one wounded.

Cerberus spent much of the first half of 1814 in the Gulf of Venice. However, on 16 January the French frigate Uranie escaped from Ancona. Cerberus chased her into Brindisi. She did not pursue her further as Brindisi owed allegiance to the Kingdom of Naples, an English ally. When Apollo arrived, the French unloaded the powder from Uranie and set her on fire.

== Fate ==
Cerberus then returned to England. She was lying at Sheerness when the Navy Office offered her for sale on 14 September. She was sold on 29 September 1814 for £2,800.
