= French frigate Cornélie (1797) =

Virgine-class frigate

History

France
- Name: Cornélie
- Launched: 19 September 1797
- Captured: 14 June 1808 by Spain

Spain
- Name: Cornélie
- Acquired: 1808 by capture
- Renamed: Cornelia
- Fate: Sold 21 October 1815 and broken up

General characteristics
- Class & type: Virginie-class frigate
- Displacement: 1,390 tonneaux
- Tons burthen: 720 port tonneaux
- Length: 47.4 m (155 ft 6 in)
- Beam: 11.9 m (39 ft 1 in)
- Draught: 5.5 m (18 ft 1 in)
- Armament: 40 guns (though pierced for 44 guns); 28 × 18-pounder cannon and 12 × 12-pounder cannon
- Armour: Timber

The Cornélie was a 40-gun Virginie-class frigate of the French Navy.

In April 1799, along with Vengeance and Sémillante, she fought against HMS St Fiorenzo and HMS Amelia.

On 4 August 1803 Cornélie sortied from Toulon as part of a squadron of four frigates and some corvettes. Cornélie captured the schooner HMS Redbridge and the water transport that Redbridge was escorting from Malta to Admiral Nelson's fleet.

She took part in the Battle of Cape Finisterre and in the Battle of Trafalgar.

On 14 June 1808, The Spanish captured a French squadron at Cádiz that included Cornélie. The Spaniards then brought her into Spanish service as Cornelia. She was sold at Havana on 21 October 1815 and broken up.
