= HMS Acute (1797) =

British gunvessel (1797–1802)

History

Great Britain
- Name: GB No.6
- Ordered: 7 February 1797
- Builder: John Randall, Rotherhithe
- Laid down: February 1797
- Launched: April 1797
- Renamed: HMS Acute
- Fate: Sold 1802

General characteristics
- Class & type: Acute-class gunbrig
- Tons burthen: 16084/94 (bm)
- Length: Overall:75 ft 3 in (22.9 m); Keel:61 ft 9 1/2 in (18.8 m)
- Beam: 22 ft 1 1/2 in (6.7 m)
- Depth of hold: 8 ft 0 in (2.4 m)
- Armament: 2 × 24-pounder bow chase guns + 10 × 18-pounder carronades

HMS Acute was an Acute-class gunvessel launched in 1797 and sold in 1802.

== Career ==
Lieutenant Jeremiah Leaver commissioned Acute in April 1797.

In May 1798 Acute participated in Sir Home Popham's failed attack on Ostend.

Acute was coppered at Sheerness in June 1798.

In November she was under the command of Lieutenant Anthont Thompson.

By June 1800 Lieutenant Leaver had returned to command of Acute.

On 14 December 1801 Lieutenant Leaver came in front of a Court-martial on board Waaksaamheidt. Acute's crew had accused Leaver of having embezzled a part of His Majesty's stores entrusted to him, and of having deprived the crew of part of their provisions. He was acquitted of the first part of the charges, but found guilty in part of the second part, with the result that the Court reprimanded him severely.

In February 1802 Lieutenant Robert Bones assumed command of Acute.

Following the signing of the Peace of Amiens, Acute was paid off on 18 April 1802 at Sheerness.

== Fate ==
The "Principal Officers and Commissioners of His Majesty's Navy" offered "Acute, 161 Tons, Copper-bottomed, lying at Sheerness", for sale on 7 October 1802. She sold there on that date.
