= HMS Asp (1797) =

Brig of the Royal Navy

History

Great Britain
- Name: HMS Asp
- Namesake: Asp
- Ordered: 7 February 1797
- Builder: John Randall, Rotherhithe
- Laid down: February 1797
- Launched: 10 April 1797
- Honours and awards: Naval General Service Medal with clasp "Egypt"
- Fate: Sold c.July 1803

General characteristics
- Class & type: Acute-class gunbrig
- Tons burthen: 15885/94 (bm)
- Length: Overall:75 ft 1 in (22.9 m); Keel:61 ft 7 3/4 in (18.8 m)
- Beam: 22 ft 1 in (6.7 m)
- Depth of hold: 7 ft 11 1/4 in (2.4 m)
- Complement: 50
- Armament: 12 × 18-pounder carronades + 2 × 24-pounder bow chasers

HMS Asp was an Acute-class gunbrig (ex-GB No.5), of the British Royal Navy. The Navy disposed of her in 1803.

== Career ==
Lieutenant Joseph Edmonds commissioned Asp in April 1797, for the Channel.

In 1798 she participated in Sir Home Popham's failed attack on Ostend. While she engaged shore batteries four hours in support of a landing by troops she had one seaman killed, and Lieutenant Edmonds was wounded.

Between 1798 and 1803 she was under the command of Lieutenant Isaac Ferriers. Asp and Biter shared in the proceeds of the capture on 18 June 1799 of the galliot Jane.

In July 1800 Asp escorted a convoy to the West Indies.

Because Asp served in the navy's Egyptian campaign between 8 March 1801 and 2 September, her officers and crew qualified for the clasp "Egypt" to the Naval General Service Medal that the Admiralty issued in 1847 to all surviving claimants.

== Fate ==
Asp was paid-off on 15 February 1803. She was sold circa July 1803.
