= HM hired brig Telegraph (1798) =

History

Great Britain
- Name: Telegraph
- Commissioned: 10 November 1798
- Honours and awards: Naval General Service Medal with clasp "Telegraph 18 March 1799"
- Fate: Lost on or around 14 February 1801

General characteristics
- Type: Brig
- Tons burthen: 26281/94 (bm)
- Armament: 14 × 18-pounder carronades + 2 × 6-pounder chase guns

HM hired brig Telegraph was built in 1798 and served on contract to the Royal Navy from 10 November. (Note: Winfield, based on Admiralty records, reports only the fourteen 18-pounder carronades. James, writing about the ship action that occurred a year after Telegraph entered service, adds the two 6-pounders.) During the French Revolutionary Wars she took several prizes and was the victor in one notable ship action before she was lost at sea with all hands in 1801.

== Telegraph vs Hirondelle ==
At daylight on 18 March 1799, Telegraph, under Lieutenant James Andrew Worth, was some leagues northwest of the Île de Batz when she encountered the French privateer Hirondelle. Hirondelle was armed with sixteen mixed 8-pounder and 6-pounder guns, and had a crew of 72, to Telegraph's 60 men. Hirondelle was three days out of St Malo and had taken two prizes, an American schooner and an English sloop. The need for two prize crews had reduced her crew from the 89 men with which she had started.

Hirondelle tacked to meet Telegraph and the two vessels started an exchange of fire at 0730 hours. Each tried to board the other, but finally, at 1100 hours, Hirondelle struck. She had suffered five men killed and 14 wounded and was totally dismasted and unmanageable. Telegraph had five men wounded. For his part in the action, Worth received promotion to the rank of commander.

Seagull shared in the prize money, suggesting that she was in sight. Havick too claimed a share of the head-money, perhaps on the grounds of being in sight, a claim that Telegraph's officers and crew contested. The matter was not settled until 1818. (Note: A distribution of the monies took place in November 1818, after Captain Bartholomew of Havick had died, as had many crew members from Telegraph. A first-class share of the hull and stores to Telegraph was worth £8 0s 4d; a fifth-class share, that of a seaman, was worth 6s 8 3/4d. A first-class share of the head money to Telegraph was worth £39 9s 7 1/2d; a fifth-class share was worth 18s 9 1/2d.)

In 1847 the Admiralty issued the clasp "Telegraph 18 March 1799" to the Naval General Service Medal for the action with Hirondelle. However, none of Telegraph's crew came forward to claim their medal, presumably in great part because most had been lost when she foundered in 1801.

== Prize taking ==
Lieutenant Caesar Corsellis replaced Worth as captain of Telegraph. On 5 May she captured the galiot Vrouw Martha. One month later she joined the Mediterranean fleet off the Gulf of Fréjus with news of the French fleet. In November she captured the galiot Beuns von Koningsberg. On 28 November Telegraph brought into Falmouth the De Boers, Captain Skimming. She had been sailing from Bilbao to Altona with a cargo of cotton.

Telegraph, which had been with coasting convoys, arrived in Plymouth from Torbay on 1 January 1800. On 2 January there was a report that a French privateer had taken a brig in Whitsand Bay and then landed a boat at Looe Island that had taken a cow and some corn from a poor man living there. A telegraph message dispatched Telegraph in pursuit. There is no further information, suggesting that Telegraph was unsuccessful.

On 17 April Telegraph was in company with the sloop Spitfire when Spitfire captured the French privateer Heureux Societe. Heureux Societe, of Pleinpoint, was armed with 14 guns and had a crew of 64 men. She had been out three days and had not made any captures. During the chase Telegraph exchanged a broadside with Heureux Societe but then fell behind, leaving the capture to Spitfire.

On 22 May Telegraph came into Plymouth. A gale a few days earlier had put Telegraph on her beam ends for several minutes with water up to the combing of her hatchways. It was only when the fore top-mast and the bowsprit went that she righted.

A worse storm on 9 November wrecked many vessels along the coast. Telegraph survived because her crew cut away her main-mast. She had been in St Aubin's Bay in Jersey together with a number of vessels that also survived. (Note: The Times reported Telegraph coming into Plymouth on 18 November from Jersey and without her mainmast.) Another vessel in the Bay that was less fortunate was Havick, which sank, though fortunately with no loss of life.

In mid-November or so, the hired brig Flora drifted ashore in Plymouth and was wrecked. Telegraph and Sylph came to Flora's assistance and rescued her crew. Flora was subsequently refitted for duty.

By December 1800, Telegraph's commander was Lieutenant John Mundall. Mundall's commission as lieutenant, however, dated from 10 January 1801. Under his command she captured the galliot Jussrow Bielke in December 1800. On 5 January 1801 she captured the Dutch ship Cornelia.

Telegraph returned from a cruise on 23 January after stopping six vessels. She sent two Swedish and one Danish vessel into Dartmouth, the latter with a valuable cargo of tobacco from Baltimore bound for Stockholm. The Dane arrived on 4 January. The General Wraigh arrived at Portsmouth on 26 January and the Catherine Margaretta, which had been sailing from Seville to Altona, arrived on 4 February. On 3 February, the Vrow Jenetta, of Altona, came into Plymouth. When Telegraph had captured her she had been sailing from St. Bartolomew's to Hamburgh with a cargo of sugar and coffee. In all, on the one cruise Telegraph had captured six vessels.

== Loss ==
Telegraph parted from the Mediterranean fleet off Cape Ortegal in a gale on 14 February 1801. She was never heard of thereafter and was declared lost, presumably having foundered in the gale. Mundall may have been temporary or acting captain because at the time of the sinking Telegraph's captain was again Lieutenant Caesar Corsellis.

== Post loss developments ==
On 21 January 1803 prize money resulting from the capture of the galiot Beuns von Koningsberg and ship Cornelia was due for payment.

On 31 March 1805 the prize money for the capture of Jussrow Bielke was made available for claiming.

The head money for the capture of Hirondelle, long in dispute with the officers and company of Havick, was finally deposited in the Registry of the High Court of Admiralty on 26 October 1818.
