= John Sheridan (Royal Navy officer) =

British Royal Navy officer (1778–1862)

Vice-Admiral John Sheridan
- Born: c. 1778
- Died: 15 May 1862 (aged 83–84); Skisdon Lodge, Cornwall
- Military career
- Allegiance: United Kingdom of Great Britain and Ireland
- Branch: Royal Navy
- Service years: 1795 – 1862
- Rank: Vice-Admiral
- Commands: HMS Terror
- Conflicts: French Revolutionary Wars; Napoleonic Wars; Anglo-Russian War; War of 1812; Battle of Baltimore

Vice-Admiral John Sheridan (c.1778 – 15 May 1862) was an officer of the Royal Navy who saw service in most of the major conflicts of the early nineteenth century, including the French Revolutionary and Napoleonic Wars, the Anglo-Russian War and the War of 1812.

Sheridan had risen to lieutenant by the end of the French Revolutionary Wars, and with the resumption of hostilities in 1803 was serving in the English Channel. Here he acquitted himself well in several actions, after which he moved to the Baltic and was active in several engagements against the Russians during the Anglo-Russian War. Promoted to commander as a result, he took the bomb vessel HMS Terror to North America and was present at the assault on Fort McHenry during the Battle of Baltimore, actions which inspired the writing of the poem that became the words to "The Star-Spangled Banner". Promoted to post-captain towards the end of the Napoleonic Wars he retired ashore, and died in 1862 with the rank of vice-admiral.

== Career ==
Sheridan was born c. 1778 and entered the navy in 1795, shortly after the outbreak of the French Revolutionary Wars. He rose quickly through the ranks, was promoted to lieutenant on 21 December 1801 and by 1803 was senior lieutenant aboard HMS Merlin, which was then serving in the English Channel under Commander Edward Pelham Brenton. On 27 October 1803 Merlin and the schooner HMS Milbrook captured the 2-gun privateer Sept Frères, after which Sheridan saw action at the bombardments of Le Havre on 23 July and 1 August 1804. Sheridan then took part in the burning of the wreck of the frigate HMS Shannon near Barfleur on 10 December 1804, the Shannon having run aground under French shore batteries while sailing in company with Merlin. Sheridan went on to be active during the war with Russia which broke out in 1807, serving aboard HMS Bellerophon. He was present at the capture of three Russian ships off the coast of Finland, and at the attack on several Russian gunboats at Percola Point. In the latter action, a Russian flotilla was attacked on the night of 7 July by 17 boats, led by Lieutenant Hawkey of HMS Implacable, who was killed in the action. Seven of the eight gunboats were captured, and 12 craft containing stores for the army were also taken. For his actions during the engagement Sheridan was promoted to commander.

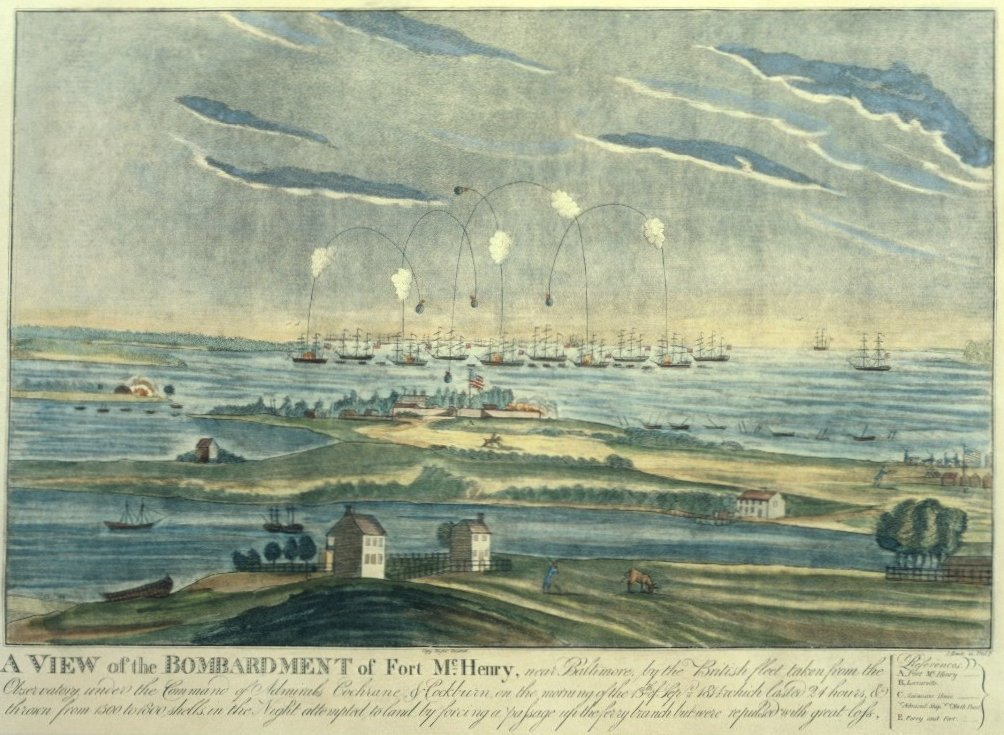
The Bombardment of Fort McHenry.

Sheridan was given command of the newly built bomb vessel HMS Terror, and commissioned her on 7 October 1813. He went out with her to North America to support British operations there during the War of 1812, and at 9pm on 12 September 1814 Terror and the bomb vessels HMS Volcano, HMS Starr, HMS Devastation, and HMS Aetna, and the rocket vessel HMS Erebus anchored off Fort McHenry to support land-based operations in the Battle of Baltimore. They commenced firing at daylight, but could not inflict much damage, and after making a probing assault by boat, the British withdrew. The assault was witnessed by Francis Scott Key, who was inspired to write a poem describing the events, which later became the words to the United States' national anthem, "The Star-Spangled Banner". Sheridan later served off the coast of Georgia, being promoted to post-captain in June 1815 towards the conclusion of the Napoleonic Wars, and being succeeded in the command of Terror that month by Constantine Richard Moorsom.

He did not serve again at sea following the end of the wars, though he continued to rise through the ranks according to his seniority. He had reached the rank of vice-admiral (promoted in retirement in 1858) by the time of his death, on 15 May 1862 at Skisdon Lodge, Cornwall, at the age of 84.
