= HMS Express (1815) =

History

United States
- Name: Achilles
- Launched: 1809
- Renamed: Anna Maria (1813)
- Fate: Captured c.1813-14

United Kingdom
- Name: HMS Anna Maria
- Acquired: c.1814 by capture
- Honours and awards: Naval General Service Medal (NGSM) with clasp "The Potomac 17 Augt. 1814"
- Fate: Sold 1815 to the Admiralty

United Kingdom
- Name: HMS Express
- Acquired: May 1815 by purchase of a prize
- Fate: Sold 1827

General characteristics
- Tons burthen: 9227/94 (bm)
- Length: 64 ft 6 1/2 in (19.7 m) (overall); 53 ft 6 3/8 in (16.3 m) (keel)
- Beam: 18 ft 0 in (5.5 m)
- Depth of hold: 7 ft 1 in (2.2 m)
- Sail plan: Schooner
- Complement: 26
- Armament: 4 × 12-pounder carronades

HMS Express was the American merchant vessel Achilles, launched in 1809 in America. Her owners in 1813 renamed her Anna Maria. In 1814 she served the British Royal Navy in North American waters as an advice boat. In 1815 the Royal Navy commissioned her as HMS Express, a ship's tender serving in the Mediterranean. In 1816 she was at the bombardment of Algiers. The Navy sold her at Malta in 1827.

== HMS Anna Maria ==
It is not clear when the Royal Navy captured Anna Maria. On 27 November 1813 HMS Plantagenet captured the "Sloop Anna Maria, of 7 men and 60 tons, from Philadelphia, bound to New York". This is the most likely candidate from among the several Anna Marias whose capture was announced in the London Gazette.

Anna Maria participated in the expedition up the Potomac (August–September 1814). On 17 August Euryalus, bomb vessels Devastation, Aetna, and Meteor, the rocket ship Erebus, and the dispatch boat Anna-Maria were detached under Captain Gordon of Seahorse to sail up the Potomac River and bombard Fort Washington, about ten or twelve miles below the capital.

Later Euryalus contributed a boat armed with a howitzer to assist Meteor, Fairy, Anna Maria, and a gunboat taken in prize in their unsuccessful attempt to stop the Americans from adding guns to a battery that would impede the British withdrawal. (Note: A first-class share of the prize money for the campaign was worth £183 9s 1 3/4d; a sixth-class share was worth £1 19s 3 1/2d. For a second and final payment, the respective amounts were £42 13s 10 3/4d and 9s 1 3/4d. For the capture of the Chesapeake in August, there was a separate award of £2 6s 3d and 6d, respectively.) In 1847 the Admiralty awarded the Naval General Service Medal (NGSM) with clasp "The Potomac 17 Augt. 1814" to all surviving claimants from the campaign; the listing of the vessels qualifying gives the name of Anna Maria's commander as "Jackson".

Anna Maria also shared in the prize money for the schooner Mary and the goods from the transports Lloyd and Abeona, captured in the Chesapeake between 29 November and 19 December 1814. (Note: A first-class share of the prize money was worth £26 15s 10 1/2d; a sixth-class share, that of an ordinary seaman, was worth 6s 1 1/2d.)

== HMS Express ==
The Admiralty purchased Anna Maria in May of 1815. She was then commissioned in June as HMS Express under the command of Lieutenant E. Garrett. Thereafter she served in the Mediterranean as a tender.

Express was at the bombardment of Algiers on 27 August 1816. (Note: She is not among the vessels whose crews qualified for the NGSM with clasp Algiers that the Admiralty authorized in 1847. However, as a tender, all of her crew would have been drawn from the vessel she was serving and would have qualified in that capacity.)

From September 1821 Express served as a tender to Revenge with Mate James Gordon as her commander. From March to July 1824 she was at the blockade of Algiers. Lloyd's List reported that on 29 February, The Express Ship of War, one of the English Squadron blockading Algiers, arrived at Marseilles. Gordon left Express on 27 June 1826, on his promotion to lieutenant.

== Fate ==
The Royal Navy sold Express on 26 July 1827 at Malta.
