= HMS Fairy (1812) =

Brig-sloop of the Royal Navy

History

United Kingdom
- Name: HMS Fairy
- Builder: William Taylor, Bideford
- Launched: 1812
- Commissioned: August 1812
- Decommissioned: 1815
- Honors and awards: Naval General Service Medal with the clasp "The Potomac 17 Augt. 1814"
- Fate: Broken up, 1821

General characteristics
- Class & type: Cruizer-class brig-sloop
- Tons burthen: 386 80/94 bm
- Length: 100 ft 1 1/2 in (30.518 m) (o/a); 77 ft 4 in (23.57 m) (keel)
- Beam: 30 ft 8 in (9.35 m)
- Depth of hold: 13 ft 3 in (4.04 m)
- Sail plan: Brig
- Complement: 121
- Armament: 16 × 32-pounder carronades + 2 × 6-pounder bow guns

HMS Fairy (1812) was a Cruizer-class brig-sloop, built by William Taylor at Bideford and launched in 1812. She escorted convoys during the War of 1812 and participated in the Raid on Alexandria, the Royal Navy's incursion up the Potomac in 1814. She was broken up in 1821.

== Service ==
Fairy was commissioned in August 1812 under Commander Edward Grey for South America. On 25 December she recaptured the Viagante. While on the South America station she escorted convoys; in June 1813 she joined a convoy of over 500 merchant vessels bound for Spain, Portugal, the Mediterranean, Brazil, North America, and the West Indies.

Commander Henry Loraine Baker took command on 18 April 1814. Two days later, Fairy left Portsmouth for the West Indies. Between 20 and 31 August she carried dispatches from Admiral Sir Alexander Cochrane. She fought her way up the Potomac River to recall Captain James Alexander Gordon (commanding Seahorse) and his squadron, who had taken Alexandria, Virginia, two days before. The British had also captured 21 merchant vessels and looted stores and warehouses of 16,000 barrels of flour, 1,000 hogsheads of tobacco, 150 bales of cotton, and some $5,000 worth of wine, sugar, and other items.

The Americans had a battery of five guns that fired on Fairy as she sailed to reach Gordon. The battery was situated high on a bluff at White House Plantation (modern day Fort Belvoir), and on 1 September, Gordon sent Fairy, Meteor and several smaller vessels in an unsuccessful attempt to engage the battery and impede its completion. In all, the Americans had placed a total of 11 guns—five naval long guns and eight artillery field pieces—as well as a furnace for heating shot.

The British spent most of 2 September mustering their ships and prizes for the run down river while awaiting favorable winds. At the same time they were working to free the bomb vessel Devastation, which had run aground.

On 3 September, the bomb vessel Aetna and rocket ship Erebus joined in the effort to silence the American batteries. That same day, Commodore John Rodgers, with four U.S. gunboats and some fire ships, failed in an attempt to destroy Devastation. Sniping and gunfire continued throughout 4 and 5 September, as the Virginia militia arrived to block British landings at the batteries or Alexandria.

On 6 September, the frigates Seahorse and Euryalus came down the river and joined Fairy. All three vessels shifted their ballast to the port side to enable their combined 63 starboard guns to elevate sufficiently to engage the batteries. They then opened fire and within 45 minutes silenced the American cannon.

All eight British warships and 21 merchant vessel prizes moved back to the main fleet. During the run down the river, the British had suffered only seven dead, though one was Charles Dickson, Fairy's second lieutenant. Fairy also had seven men badly or severely wounded. The Admiralty issued the Naval General Service Medal with the clasp "The Potomac 17 Augt. 1814" to those members of the vessels' crews that had survived to 1847.

On 30 October Fairy captured the schooner Commodore Decatur.

Commander Hugh Patton replaced Baker in June 1815. Fairy was in the West Indies where she, together with Barbadoes and Dasher, captured the French vessels Belle Victoire and Somnambule on 22 and 27 July. Fairy then took part in the seizure of Guadeloupe in August 1815, where she helped cover the landing and helped silence a battery with her fire.

Fairy arrived at Plymouth on 16 September with dispatches.

== Fate ==
From 1816 to 1818 Fairy was at Plymouth. She was broken up in 1821.
