= HMS Euryalus (1803) =

Frigate of the Royal Navy

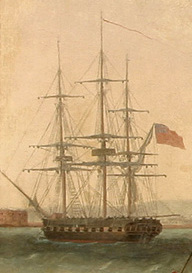
- Euryalus

History

United Kingdom
- Name: HMS Euryalus
- Ordered: 16 August 1800
- Builder: Balthazar & Edward Adams, Bucklers Hard
- Laid down: October 1801
- Launched: 6 June 1803
- Commissioned: June 1803
- Decommissioned: 1825
- Reclassified: Prison hulk, 1825
- Honours and awards: Naval General Service Medal with clasps; "Trafalgar"; "The Potomac 17 Augt. 1814"
- Fate: Broken up, 1860

General characteristics
- Class & type: Apollo-class frigate
- Tons burthen: 94616/94 (bm)
- Length: Overall:145 ft 2 in (44.2 m); Keel:121 ft 11 3/4 in (37.2 m)
- Beam: 38 ft 2 1/4 in (11.6 m)
- Depth of hold: 13 ft 3 in (4.0 m)
- Complement: 264 men
- Armament: Upper deck: 26 × 18-pounder guns; QD: 2 × 9-pounder guns + 10 × 32-pounder carronades; Fc: 2 × 9-pounder guns + 4 × 32-pounder carronades

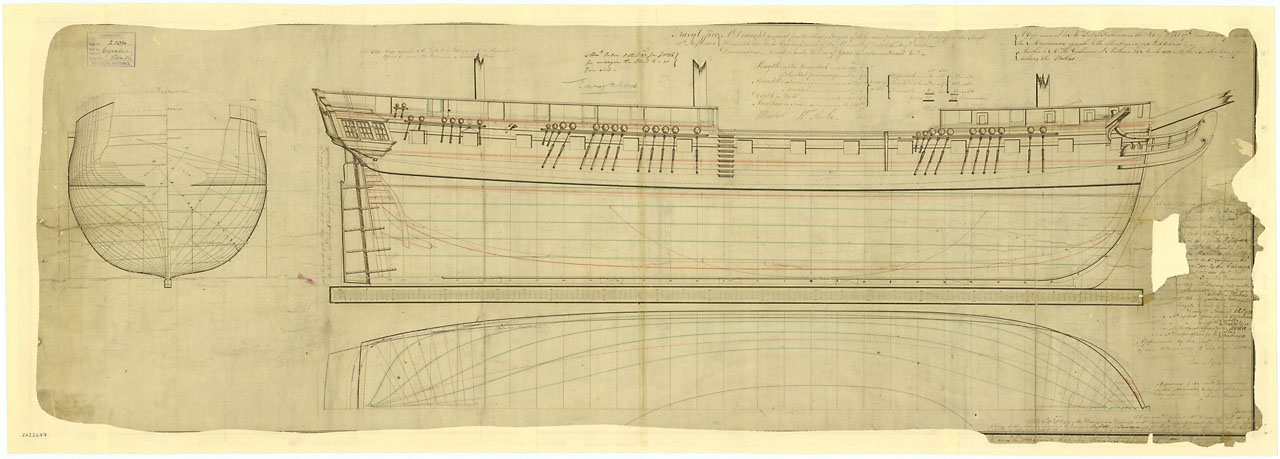
Plan of the Euryalus dated 1803

HMS Euryalus was a 36-gun Apollo-class frigate of the Royal Navy which served in the Napoleonic Wars and War of 1812. Launched in 1803, during her career she was commanded by three prominent British naval officers of the Napoleonic era: Henry Blackwood, George Heneage Lawrence Dundas and Charles John Napier. Following the end of the Napoleonic Wars, Euryalus continued on active service for a number of years, before spending more than two decades as a prison hulk. She ended her career in Gibraltar where, in 1860, she was sold for breaking up.

== Napoleonic Wars ==
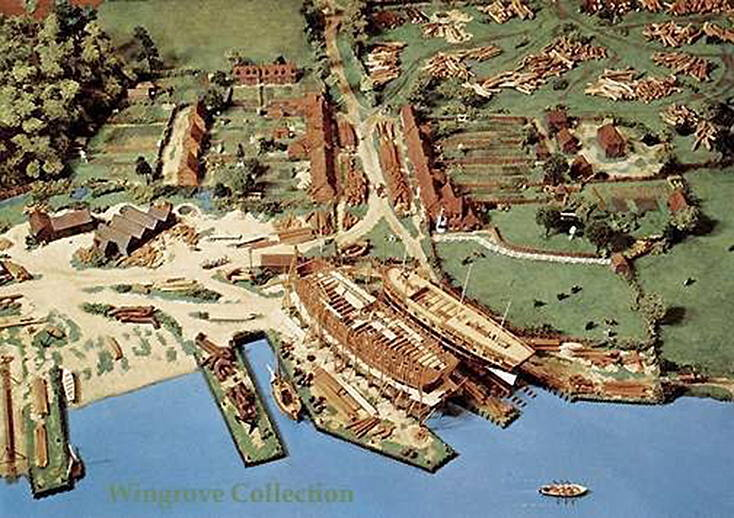
Bucklers Hard, as it was, on 5 June 1803, the day before the launch of Euryalus

Euryalus was built by Henry Adams's firm at Buckler's Hard, and launched in 1803. Her first action occurred on 2 and 3 October 1804 when, captained by Henry Blackwood, she participated in an attack on French vessels off Boulogne pier. During Blackwood's absence, Captain J. Hardy temporarily commanded her. On 18 October, she was driven ashore on Spike Island, County Cork.

On 22 February 1805, Euryalus captured St Jose while on the Irish station. Dryad shared in the prize by agreement with Euryalus.

In March Euryalus pressed four men of the 41 men and boys on the Liverpool privateer Eliza. Eliza's owners sued Blackwood for £3000, contending that Blackwood's action in ignoring the Admiralty Certificate of Protection covering Eliza's crew had ended up costing them that much in prize money by reducing their share of the proceeds from a rich Spanish prize they took in April. The prize money was shared with the privateer Greyhound, which had participated in the capture, on the basis of the sizes of the two crews. Despite the judge's leading instructions to the jury, which emphasized Blackwood's service to England, the jury found for the plaintiffs.

=== Battle of Trafalgar ===
In 1805 she led a squadron of four other frigates in watching Cádiz to report the movements of the combined French and Spanish fleets anchored there. The combined fleet sailed from Cádiz on 20 October, shadowed through the night by Euryalus and the others that reported its position to the Royal Navy fleet on the horizon.

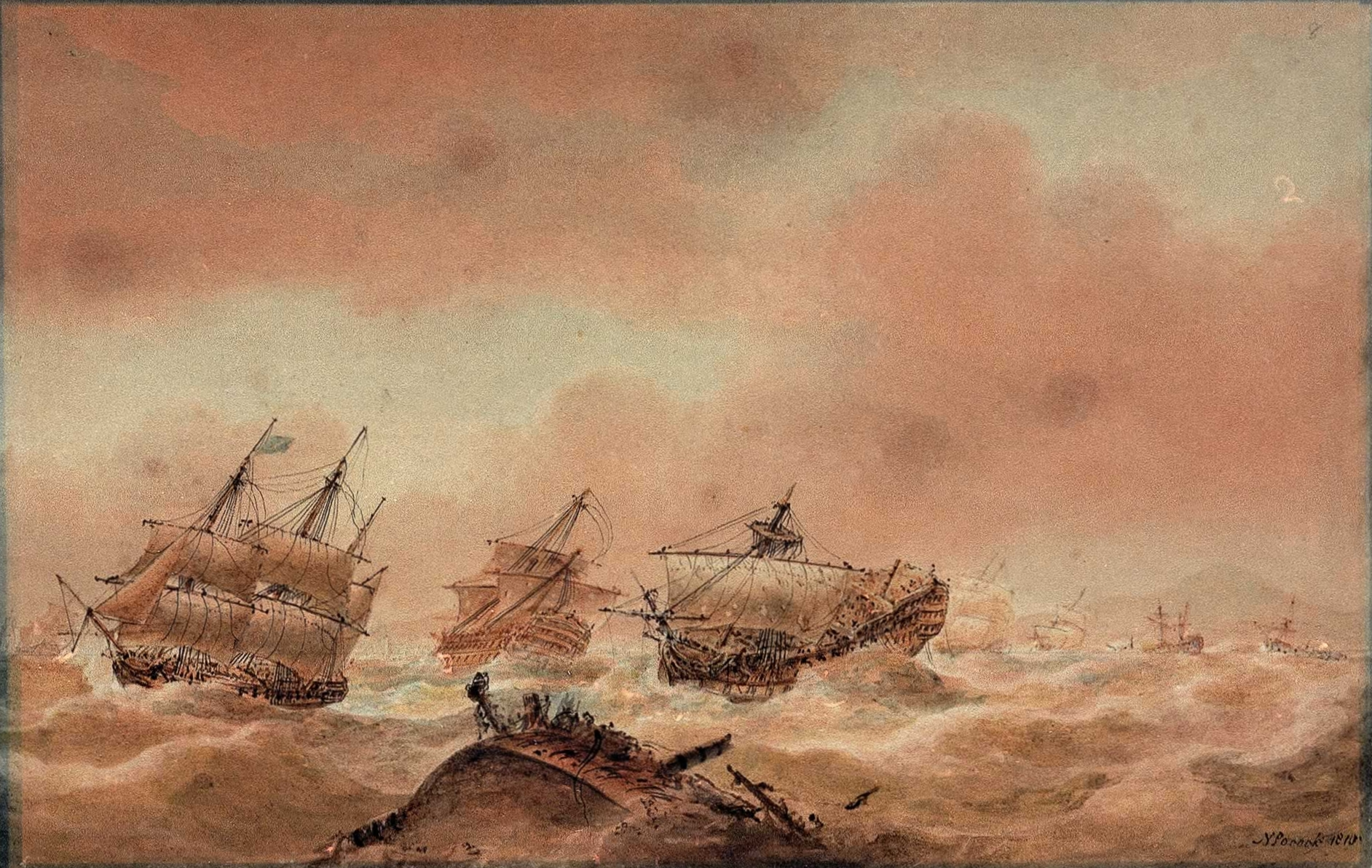
The Day after Trafalgar – The Victory Trying to Clear the Land with the Royal Sovereign in Tow to the Euryalus painting by Nicholas Pocock

With battle imminent the following morning, Captain Blackwood suggested that Admiral Horatio Nelson transfer from Victory to the faster Euryalus, the better to observe and control the engagement. Nelson declined the offer. Euryalus - too small to play a major role - stood off until the late afternoon when she took the badly damaged Royal Sovereign in tow and turned her to engage the French ship Formidable.

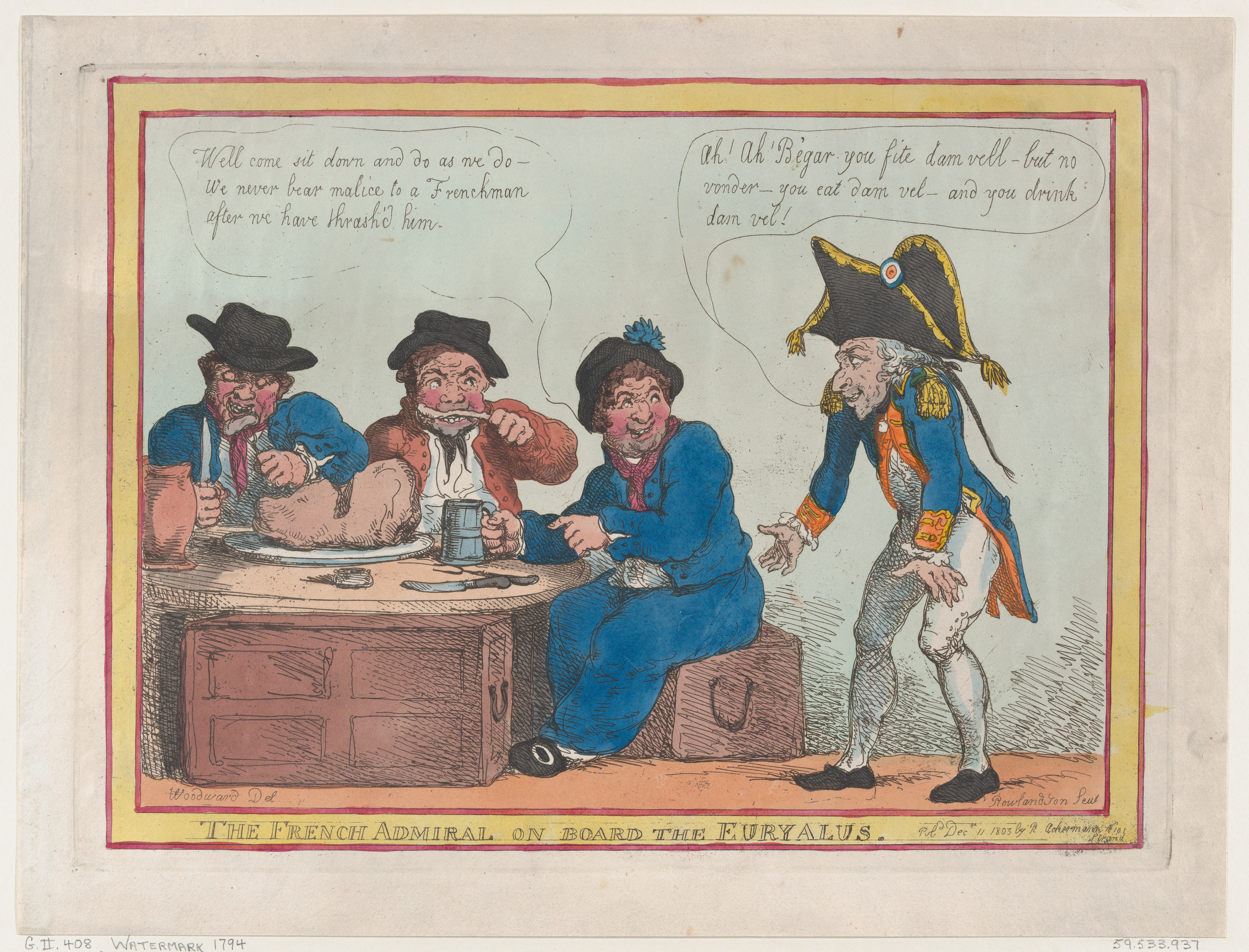
The French Admiral on board the Euryalus, an etching from 1805

Following the death of Admiral Nelson, Admiral Cuthbert Collingwood transferred his flag from Royal Sovereign to Euryalus. She became for the next ten days the British fleet's flagship.

After the battle Euryalus took on survivors from the French ship-of-the-line Achille, as well as the captured French Admiral Pierre de Villeneuve. Blackwood also received the surrender of the Spanish ship Santa Ana, after two raking broadsides to the stern by Royal Sovereign and Belleisle had caused her to strike her colours.

Euryalus again took Royal Sovereign in tow but the two ships collided during a sudden squall, badly damaging the frigate's masts and rigging. Once repairs were completed, Euryalus went into Cádiz Harbour to allow Blackwood to negotiate an exchange of prisoners and the repatriation of French and Spanish wounded. On 31 October, Euryalus set sail for England with Admiral Villeneuve as a prisoner. In 1847 the Admiralty awarded the Naval General Service Medal (NGSM) with clasp "Trafalgar" to all surviving claimants from the battle.

=== Mediterranean, post-Trafalgar ===
On 5 February 1806 Blackwood was still in command of Euryalus when the privateer Mayflower, of Guernsey, captured the Spanish vessel San Jose Andrea. This gave rise to a court case in which the captain of the privateer alleged that Eurylaus had not been in sight (and so entitled to share in the prize money), but had come on the scene later and that Blackwood had coerced him to sign that she had joined the chase and was in sight. The court found for Euryalus having been in sight.

Later that year George Dundas took command of Euryalus. Euryalus, Ocean and other warships escorted a large convoy to Oporto, Lisbon and the Mediterranean. When she arrived, she was assigned to patrol the coast between Cape St. Vincent and Cape St. Maria in the Algarve, and then to watch the port of Cartagena. After about four months she transferred to the Gulf of Lyons. In the Mediterranean her boats captured several small merchant vessels.

Towards the end of 1807 Euryalus returned to England with Niger. The two vessels escorted several thousand of the late Sir John Moore's troops from Gibraltar. On her return Euryalus went into dock at Plymouth for a refit.

Her next station was the North Sea and then the Baltic under Vice-Admiral Sir James Saumarez. First, Euryalus transported the Duke d'Angoulême from Yarmouth to Gottenburg. She then escorted Baltic convoys through the Great Belt.

On 11 June 1808, she and Cruizer discovered several vessels at anchor close to shore at the entrance to the river Naskon. Dundas anchored at dark and sent a cutting out party in four boats from the two ships to destroy the vessels. The cutting out party burnt two large troop transports and retrieved a gun-vessel armed with two 18-pounders and carrying 64 men. The successful foray took place directly under the guns of a Danish battery of three 18-pounder guns and numerous enemy troops who lined the shore. The enemy lost seven men killed and twelve wounded; the British had one man slightly wounded. In 1816 the crews of the British ships received prize money for "Danish gun-boat E".

Later that year Dundas sailed to Elbing, a small port in West Prussia about 60 kilometers (37 mi) east of Dantzig. There he took on board Princess Marie Joséphine of Savoy (the consort of Louis XVIII), the Duc du Berry and other members of the French royal family. He carried them first to Carlscrona in southern Sweden. He then re-embarked them at Gottenburg and carried them to Harwich.

On 30 July 1809, a British force of 39,000 men landed on Walcheren, initiating the Walcheren Campaign. Euryalus joined the squadron under Captain Lord William Stuart in Lavinia that on 11 August forced the passage of the Scheldt between the batteries at Flushing and Cadsand. Euryalus herself had no casualties although the British lost two men killed and nine wounded in other ships. Although the Walcheren Expedition, which ended on 9 August 1809, was notably unsuccessful, Euryalus was among the myriad vessels sharing in the prize money form the campaign.

Later she was stationed off Cherbourg under the orders of Captain Sir Richard King. On 18 November Euryalus was off Cherbourg where she captured the French privateer lugger Etoile of 14 guns and 48 men. Etoile was two days out from the Hogue without having made any captures.

On 26 April 1810 Euryalus sailed for the Mediterranean, escorting a large convoy from Spithead to Portugal and the Mediterranean. She then joined Captain Blackwood's inshore squadron off Toulon. The squadron consisted of Blackwood's Warspite, Ajax, Conqueror, Euryalus and Shearwater. A strong gale on 15 July forced the squadron to seek shelter behind the Île du Levant. The same gale drove Blackwood's ship, San Josef east to Villefranche.

On 20 July a French squadron consisting of six sail-of-the line and four frigates exited Toulon. Their objective was to provide cover to a frigate and her convoy that wished to escape from Bandol where it had taken shelter. The light and variable winds made it impossible for Blackwood to block the French squadron and the frigate and her convoy from joining up. Furthermore, while Blackwood was trying to regroup his squadron, Euryalus and Shearwater were forced to sail across the front of the French force. The wind failed for Blackwood, but not the French, making it highly likely that the French would be able to capture Euryalus and Shearwater.

Blackwood was able to position Warspite with Conqueror and Ajax astern where they could exchange broadsides with the French ships as they came up one at a time. Then the French tacked and the British line matched them, enabling Euryalus and Shearwater to escape, though not before Shearwater was on the receiving end of three completely ineffectual broadsides from one of the French ships of the line and a frigate. Despite its greater strength, the French force returned to Toulon rather than take on the British squadron.

Early in 1811 Dundas temporarily took command of the 74-gun third rate Achille until relieved by Captain Aiskew Paffard Hollis, who had transferred from Standard. Dundas then returned to Euryalus.

On 16 April 1811, Euryalus sailed for the Mediterranean. By May 1811, she was under the command of Captain George Waldegrave.

On 7 June 1811 Euryalus, again under the command of Dundas, and Swallow sent their boats in pursuit of a French privateer off Corsica. After a long chase the boats captured Intrepide, which had a crew of 58 and was armed with two 8-pounders. (Note: A first-class share of the prize money was worth £11 15s 6d; a sixth-class share, that of an ordinary seaman, was worth 2s 3 3/4d.)

In November 1812 Captain Thomas Ussher took command. His successor was Captain Jeremiah Coghlan. On 2 April, Euryalus, under Coghlan, drove a French vessel on shore on the coast of Sardinia. (Note: A first-class share was worth £147 8s 8d; a sixth-class share was worth £1 8s 10d.)

Euryalus was still in the Mediterranean when Captain (later Admiral) Charles Napier took command early in 1813. She took part in successful commerce raiding and the blockade of Toulon. On 16 May 1813, boats from Berwick and Euryalus attacked French coastal shipping at Cavalaire, east of Toulon. There they captured the French naval xebec Fortune, of ten 9-pounder guns and four swivel guns. She was under the command of Lieutenant de Vaisseaux Félix-Marie-Louise-Anne-Joseph-Julien Lecamus, and had a crew of 95 men who had abandoned her before the British boarded. In addition, the British captured 22 small coasting vessels. They took out 14, but then destroyed nine after removing their cargoes. Fifteen of the vessels were chiefly laden with oil, corn, lemons, etc., and one with empty casks; six of those destroyed were empty. In the attack Berwick lost one man killed, and Euryalus had one man missing. (Note: The prize money for Fortune and the other vessels captured at Cavalacie was lavish. A first-class share, that of Berwick's captain and Napier, was worth £3123 2s 10d; a sixth-class share was 1/155th as much, at £20 1s 6d.)

On 23 December Euryalus drove the Var-class flüte Baleine, sailing from Toulon to Ajaccio, ashore near Calvi where she bilged on the rocks. Baleine was armed with 22 guns and carried a crew of 120 men. That same day, Alcmene captured the Cerf-class schooner Flèche between Corsica and Cape Delle Molle. Flèche was armed with 12 guns, and carried a crew of 99 men and 24 soldiers. She was carrying the soldiers from Toulon to Corsica. French records place the capture off Vintimilles, and add that Flèche was escorting the storeships Lybio and Baleine, which were also carrying troops for Ajaccio, Corsica.

On 21 April 1814, in company with Undaunted, under the command of Ussher, Euryalus entered the harbour at Marseilles where they heard the news of Napoleon's defeat. Undaunted then sailed to Frejus Bay where she embarked Napoleon and transported him to Elba.

=== War of 1812 ===
Napier next took Euryalus across the Atlantic to serve in the War of 1812. In June she sailed from Gibraltar to Bermuda as part of a squadron under Captain Andrew King. The squadron escorted transports carrying troops that had been recently employed against Genoa.

Next, Napier and Euryalus participated in the expedition up the Potomac (August–September 1814), in which he was second in command of the squadron under James Alexander Gordon. On 17 August Euryalus, bombs Devastation, Aetna, and Meteor, the rocket ship Erebus, and the dispatch boat Anna-Maria were detached under Captain Gordon of Seahorse to sail up the Potomac River and bombard Fort Washington, about ten or twelve miles below the capital. On the second day of the expedition Euryalus went aground on an oyster-bank at Kettle Bottoms and took several hours to be floated off.

She subsequently took part in the bombardment and reduction of the forts defending the town of Alexandria. Later Euryalus contributed a boat armed with a howitzer to assist Meteor and Fairy in their unsuccessful attempt to stop the Americans from adding guns to a battery that would impede the British withdrawal. On 25 August a vicious squall hit the whole squadron; it temporarily put Euryalus almost on her beam ends and cost her bowsprit and the heads of all her topmasts. Only 12 hours were needed for refit, however.

Then on 5 September, Seahorse and Euryalus anchored close to the American battery and silenced it with their fire. With the rest of the squadron she then descended the Potomac, running the gauntlet of fire from enemy batteries; in all Euryalus lost three killed and ten wounded. One of the wounded was Napier, who took a musket ball in the neck. She returned to her anchorage at the mouth of the river on 9 September. In 1847 the Admiralty awarded the Naval General Service Medal (NGSM) with clasp "The Potomac 17 Augt. 1814" to all surviving claimants from the campaign. (Note: A first-class share of the prize money for the campaign was worth £183 9s 1 3/4d; a sixth-class share was worth £1 19s 3 1/2d. For a second and final payment, the respective amounts were £42 13s 10 3/4d and 9s 1 3/4d. For the capture of the Chesapeake in August, there was a separate award of £2 6s 3d and 6d, respectively.)

On 13 September Euryalus was present at the bombardment of Fort McHenry preparatory to an expedition against Baltimore. Napier led nine boats up the Patapsco River where they fired on the American troops and drew fire from Fort McHenry that killed one man.

Following these operations, on 28 January 1815 Napier issued a challenge to the captain of the frigate USS Constellation to meet Euryalus in single-ship combat. Constellation's captain, Charles Gordon, accepted, but Euryalus was first required for the naval operations preceding the Battle of New Orleans and then peace was signed before the engagement could take place. Napier wrote to Captain Gordon that he was glad they were at peace, but should that situation change 'I trust we shall have an opportunity of being better acquainted'.

During Napoleon's Hundred Days Euryalus landed troops at the mouth of the River Scheldt.

== Post-war ==
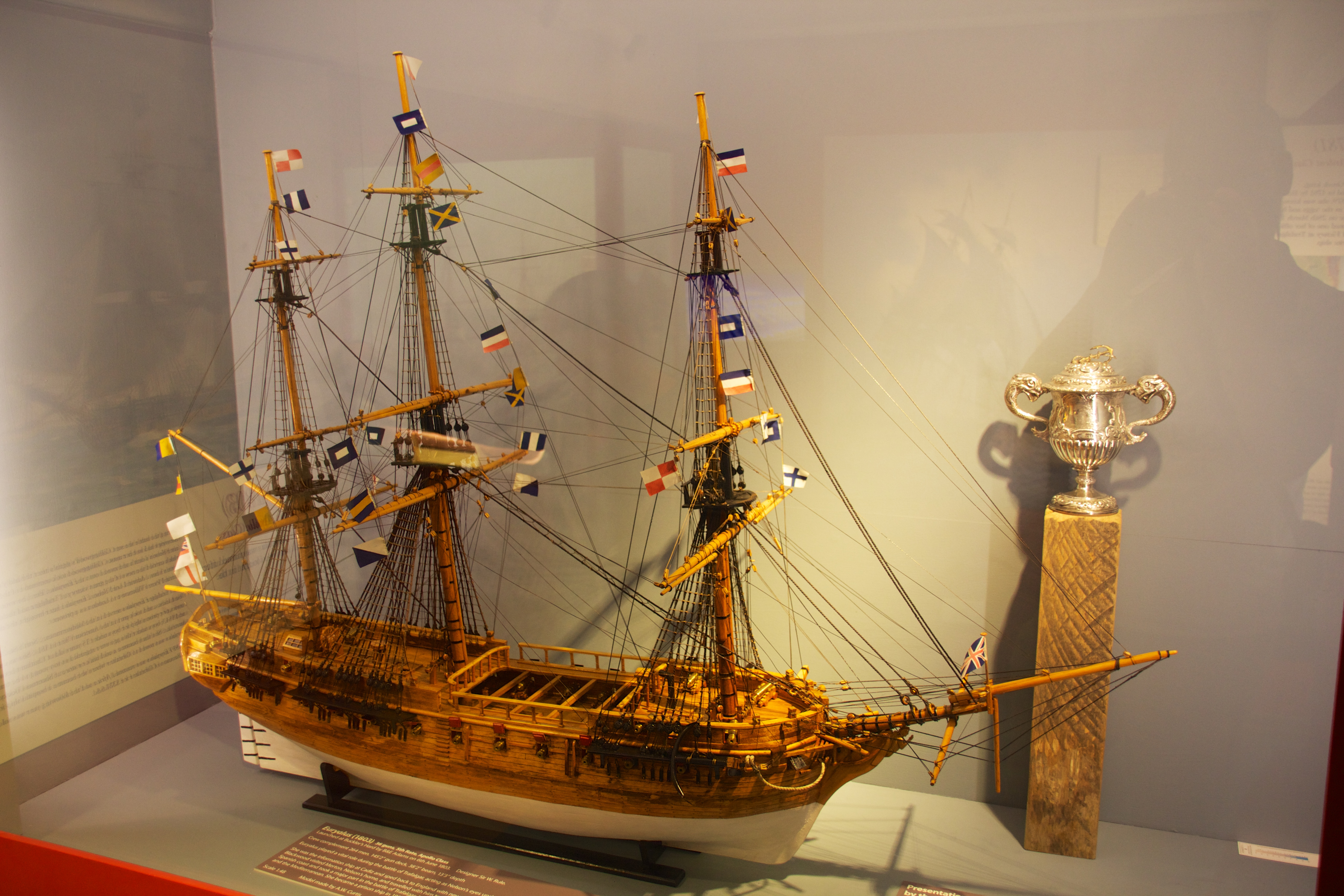
Scale 1:48 model made by A.W. Curtis. Buckler's Hard Maritime Museum, Beaulieu, Hampshire, United Kingdom.

Euryalus was paid off in June 1815. That same month Captain Thomas Huskisson recommissioned her. On 7 July she captured the French vessels Aimable Antoinette and Marie. At the time, Harrier, Towey, and Saracen were in sight and so entitled to share in the prize money. (Note: A first-class share was worth £48 10s 7 3/4d; a sixth-class share was worth 17s 7 1/2d.)

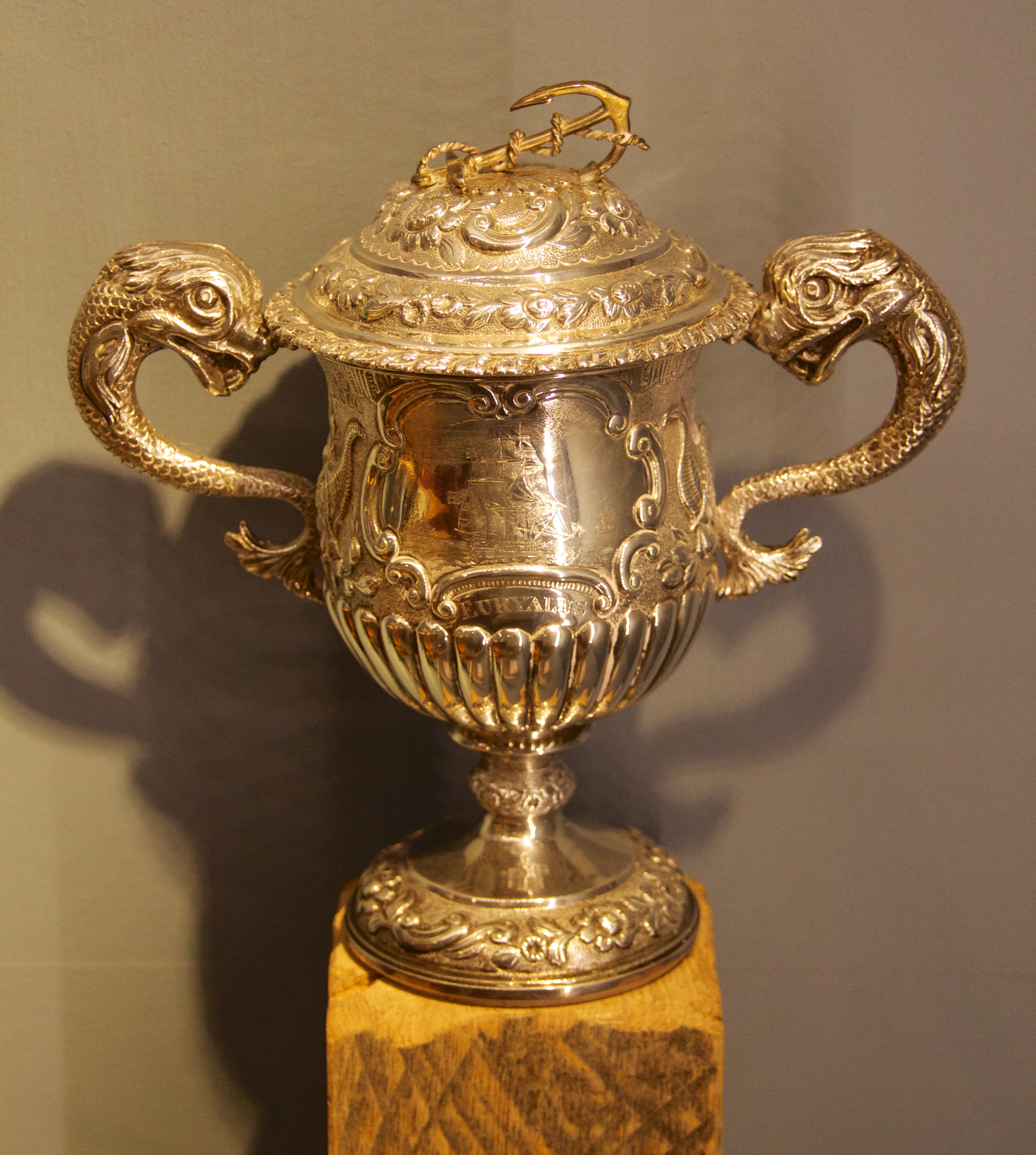
A Presentation Cup given to Charles Peake by the seamen of Euryalus, 1821

From 25 August 1818 to end 1820, Euryalus was in the West Indies. She served as the flagship in the Leeward Islands from November 1819 to May 1820, and then at Jamaica from June to December.

In January 1821 Captain Isaac Chapman became acting captain. From about June 1821 to August she was under the command of Wilson Braddyll Bigland.

Captain Sir Augustus Clifford was appointed to Euryalus on 22 October 1821 and sailed her from St Helen's with W.J. Hamilton, the British ambassador to the Neapolitan court. She would spend from 1822 to 1825 relatively uneventfully in the Mediterranean though in 1824 she participated in the blockade of Algiers. Then in late in 1824 or early in 1825, she rendered assistance to the American brig Charles and Ellen at the island of Milos. Euryalus stayed for a week, lending some 70 to 80 men to the brig to effect repairs, a kindness acknowledged her captain, P.R. Bing and two Boston insurance companies by posting a notice in the National Intelligencer of 23 March 1825. Euryalus was paid off at Deptford in 1825.

== Fate ==
After her return to England Euryalus was converted to a prison hulk. From 1825 to at least 1843, she was a prison for boys, the youngest being nine years old.

In 1845 Euryalus became a coal hulk at Sheerness. In 1846-7 she was refitted as a convict ship and in that capacity she was moved to Gibraltar. In 1859 she was renamed Africa but was sold to a Mr. Recanno for breaking up in 1860.
