= Battle of Baltimore =

1814 battle during the War of 1812

- Part of the War of 1812
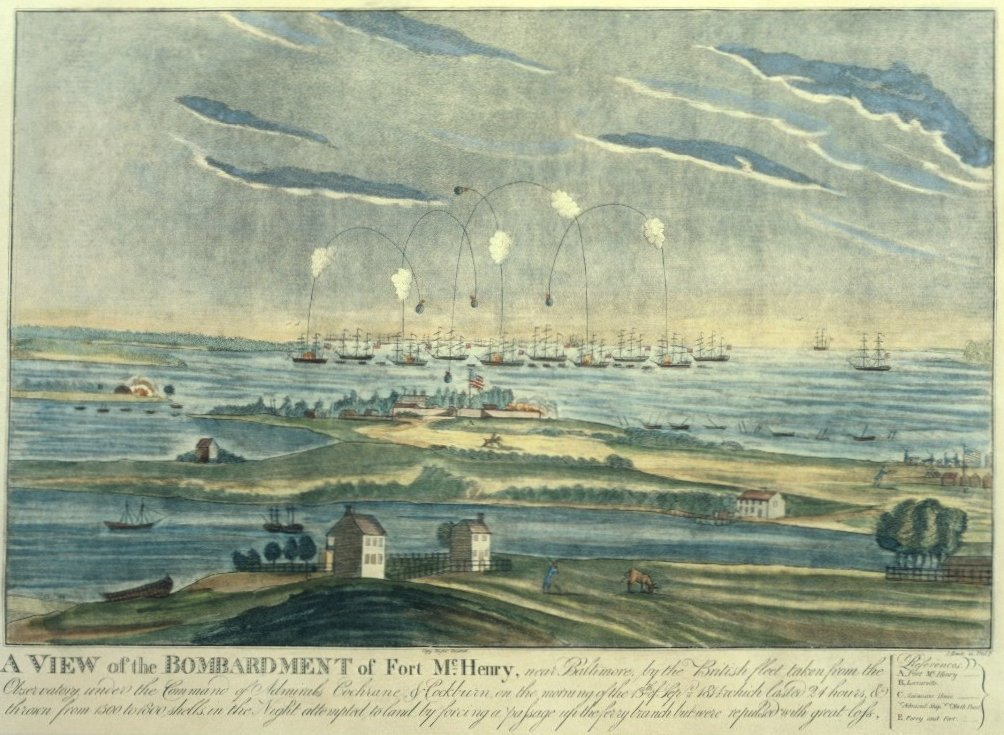
- The bombardment of Fort McHenry by the British, engraving by John Bower
Date	September 12–14, 1814
Location	Baltimore, Maryland
Result	American victory

Belligerents
United States	United Kingdom

Commanders and leaders
Samuel Smith; John Stricker; George Armistead	Robert Ross †; Alexander Cochrane; Arthur Brooke

Strength
North Point: 3,200 militia and infantry Hampstead Hill; 10,000 regulars 2,000–5,000 infantry and militia, 100+ guns Fort McHenry: 1,000 infantry and militia 20 artillery pieces Additional defense: 8,000 militia 150 artillery pieces Total: 22,000–25,000	Land: 5,000 infantry, marines, and sailors Sea: 19 warships Detachment of Chasseurs Britanniques at least a company

Casualties and losses
North Point & Hampstead Hill: 24 killed, 139 wounded, 50 captured Fort McHenry: 4 killed, 24 wounded Total: 28 killed, 163 wounded, 50 captured	North Point & Hampstead Hill: 39–46 killed, 251–295 wounded 1 missing Fort McHenry: 1 wounded Total: 39–46 killed, 252–296 wounded 1 missing

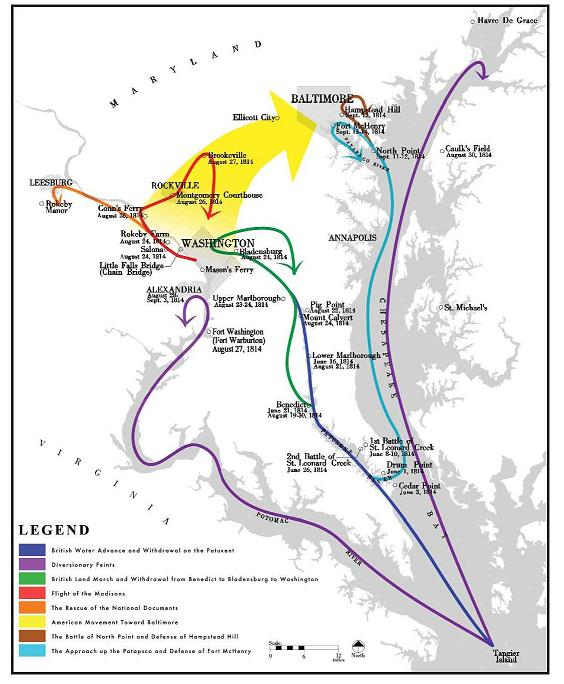

The Battle of Baltimore took place between British and American forces on September 12–14, 1814, during the War of 1812. Defending American forces repulsed sea and land invasions off the busy major port city of Baltimore, Maryland, by British forces preventing the United States' third largest city at the time from falling to British forces and ending the British Chesapeake campaign.

The British and Americans first met at the Battle of North Point. Though the Americans were tactically defeated and forced to retreat, the battle was a successful delaying action that inflicted significant casualties on the British including the commanding general Robert Ross, halted their advance, and allowed the defenders at Baltimore to prepare for an attack.

The resistance of Baltimore's Fort McHenry during bombardment by the Royal Navy inspired Francis Scott Key to compose the poem "Defence of Fort M'Henry", which later became the lyrics for "The Star-Spangled Banner," the national anthem of the United States.

Future U.S. president James Buchanan served as a private in the defense of Baltimore.

== Background ==
Until April 1814, Great Britain was at war against Napoleonic France, which limited British war aims in North America. Meanwhile, the British primarily used a defensive strategy and repelled American invasions of the Provinces of Upper and Lower Canada. The Americans gained naval control over Lake Erie in 1813 and seized parts of western Lower Canada. In the Mississippi Territory, in an area in modern central Alabama, General Andrew Jackson destroyed the military strength of the Creek nation at the Battle of Horseshoe Bend in 1814.

Although Great Britain was unwilling to draw military forces from the war with France, it still enjoyed a naval superiority on the ocean, and vessels of North America and West Indies Squadron, based at Bermuda, blockaded American ports on the Atlantic coast throughout the war, strangling the American economy. Initially, the northeastern ports were spared this blockade as public sentiments in New York and New England were against the war. The Royal Navy and Royal Marines also occupied American coastal islands and landed military forces for raids along the coast, especially around the Chesapeake Bay, encouraging enslaved Blacks to defect to the Great Britain and recruiting them into the Corps of Colonial Marines.

Following the defeat of Napoleon in early 1814, the British adopted a more aggressive strategy, intended to compel the United States to negotiate a peace that restored the pre-war status quo. Thousands of seasoned British soldiers were deployed to British North America. Most went to the Canadas to re-enforce the defenders. The British Army, Canadian militias, and their First Nations allies drove the American invaders back into the United States. Without naval control of the Great Lakes they were unable to receive supplies, resulting in the British failure to capture Plattsburgh in the Second Battle of Lake Champlain and their withdrawal from US territory.

A brigade under the command of Major General Robert Ross was sent in early July with several naval vessels to join the forces already operating from Bermuda. The combined forces were to be used for diversionary raids along the Atlantic coast, intended to force the Americans to withdraw forces from Canada. Some historians claim that they were under orders not to carry out any extended operations and were restricted to targets on the coast.

However, the British had launched three major operations targeting the three largest ports of the United States at Baltimore, New York City, via Lake Champlain and the Hudson River, and New Orleans from August 1814 to February 1815. Each of these three expeditions had over 10,000 British Army troops, many of them the best soldiers and officers from the Peninsular War, so they were not just minor diversionary raids. Britain had already captured most of modern-day Maine and re-established the Crown colony of New Ireland in September 1814.

An ambitious raid was planned as the result of a letter sent to Bermuda on June 2 by Sir George Prevost, Governor General of The Canadas, who called for retaliation in response to the "wanton destruction of private property along the north shores of Lake Erie" by American forces under Colonel John Campbell in May, the most notable being the Raid on Port Dover. Prevost argued that,

... in consequence of the late disgraceful conduct of the American troops in the wanton destruction of private property on the north shores of Lake Erie, in order that if the war with the United States continues you may, should you judge it advisable, assist in inflicting that measure of retaliation which shall deter the enemy from a repetition of similar outrages.

The letter was considered by Ross and Vice-Admiral Sir Alexander Cochrane, who had replaced Sir John Borlase Warren earlier that year as the Commander-in-Chief of the North America and West Indies Station of the Royal Navy, headquartered at Admiralty House in Bermuda, in planning how to use their forces. Cochrane's junior, Rear Admiral George Cockburn, had been commanding ships of the squadron in the operations on the Chesapeake Bay since the previous year.

On June 25 he wrote to Cochrane stressing that the defenses there were weak, and he felt that several major cities were vulnerable to attack. Cochrane suggested attacking Baltimore, Washington and Philadelphia. On July 17, Cockburn recommended Washington as the target, because of the comparative ease of attacking the national capital and "the greater political effect likely to result".

On July 18, Cochrane ordered Cockburn that to "deter the enemy from a repetition of similar outrages ..." You are hereby required and directed to "destroy and lay waste such towns and districts as you may find assailable". Cochrane instructed, "You will spare merely the lives of the unarmed inhabitants of the United States".

In August, the vessels in Bermuda sailed from the Royal Naval Dockyard and St. George's to join those already operating along the American Atlantic coast. After defeating a United States Navy gunboat flotilla, a military force totaling 4,370, composed of British Army, Royal Marines, and Royal Navy detachments for shore service, under Ross was landed in Virginia. After beating off an American force of 1,200 on the 23rd, on the 24th they attacked the prepared defenses of the main American force of roughly 6,400 US Army soldiers, militiamen, US Marines, and US Navy sailors in the Battle of Bladensburg.

Despite the considerable disadvantage in numbers, as standard military logic dictates that a three-to-one advantage is needed in carrying out an attack on prepared defenses, and sustaining heavy casualties, the British force routed the American defenders and cleared the path into Washington, D.C.. President James Madison and the entire government fled the city, and went north, to the town of Brookeville, Maryland.

On August 24, 1814, British troops led by Rear Admiral Cockburn and Major General Ross entered Washington and captured the city with a force of 4,500 "battle-hardened" men, during the burning of Washington. British troops, commanded by Ross, set fire to a number of public buildings, including the White House and the United States Capitol. Extensive damage to the interiors and the contents of both were reported. The British forces returned to their ships.

The British sent a fleet up the Potomac to cut off Washington's water access and threaten the prosperous ports of Alexandria, just downstream of Washington, and Georgetown, just upstream. The mere appearance of the fleet cowed American defenders into fleeing from Fort Warburton without firing a shot, and undefended Alexandria surrendered. The British spent several days looting hundreds of tons of merchandise from city merchants.

They then turned their attention north to Baltimore, where they hoped to strike a powerful blow against the demoralized Americans. Baltimore was a busy port and was thought by the British to harbor many of the privateers who were raiding British shipping. The British planned a combined operation, with Ross launching a land attack at North Point, and Vice-Admiral Cochrane laying siege to Fort McHenry, which was the point defensive installation in Baltimore Harbor.

Baltimore's defenses had been planned and overseen by the state militia commander, Major General Samuel Smith.

== Opposing forces ==
=== American ===
==== 10th Military District ====
- Brigadier General William Winder, U.S. Army

Division	Brigade	Regiments and other
Third Division Maryland Militia; Major General Samuel Smith	First Brigade (Harford and Cecil Counties) (Note: In the defenses at Hampstead Hill.): Brig. Gen. Thomas M. Forman	30th Regiment; 40th Regiment; 42nd Regiment; 49th Regiment
Third Division Maryland Militia; Major General Samuel Smith	Third Brigade (Baltimore city): Brig. Gen. John Stricker	5th Regiment: Lt. Col. Joseph Sterrett; York Volunteers (PA): Capt. Michael L. Spangler; 6th Regiment: Lt. Col. William McDonald; Marietta Volunteers (PA): Capt. John G. Dixon; 27th Regiment: Lt. Col. Kennedy Long; 39th Regiment: Lt. Col. Benjamin Fowler; Hanover Volunteers (PA): Capt. Frederick Metzger; Hagerstown Volunteers (MD): Capt. Thomas Quantrill; 51st Regiment: Lt. Col. Henry Amey; 1st Rifle Battalion: Maj. William Pinkney
Third Division Maryland Militia; Major General Samuel Smith	Eleventh Brigade (Baltimore County) (Note: In the defenses at Hampstead Hill.): Brig. Gen. Tobias E. Stansbury	7th Regiment; 15th Regiment; 36th Regiment; 41st Regiment; 46th Regiment
Third Division Maryland Militia; Major General Samuel Smith	1st Regiment of Artillery: Lt. Col. David Harris	Baltimore Union Artillery: Capt. John Montgomery (Note: Attached to 3rd Brigade, present at Battle of North Point.); Columbian Artillery: Capt. Samuel Moale; Franklin Artillery: Capt. John Myers; United Maryland Artillery: Capt. James Piper; 1st Baltimore Volunteer Artillery: Capt. Abraham Pyke; Eagle Artillerists: Capt. George J. Brown; American Artillerists: Capt. Richard Brown Magruder; First Marine Artillery of the Union: Capt. George Stiles; Steiner's Artillery of Frederick: Capt. Henry Steiner (Note: Attached from 9th Brigade, Maryland Militia.)
Third Division Maryland Militia; Major General Samuel Smith	5th Regiment of Cavalry: Lt. Col. James Biays	1st Baltimore Hussars; Independent Light Dragoons; Maryland Chasseurs; Fells Point Light Dragoons
Harbor defenses of Baltimore: Maj. George Armistead	Fort McHenry: Maj. George Armistead, commanding post	Evan's Company, U.S. Corps of Artillery: Capt. Frederick Evans; Bunbury's Company, U.S. Sea Fencibles: Capt. Matthew S. Bunbury; Addison's Company, U.S. Sea Fencibles: Capt. William H. Addison; Det. U.S. Infantry: Lt. Col. William Steuart (38th Infantry), Maj. Samuel Lane (14th Infantry); Company, 12th Infantry: Capt. Thomas Sangster; Company, 36th Infantry: Capt. Joseph Hook; Company, 36th Infantry: Lt. William Rogers; Company, 38th Infantry: Capt. James H. Hook; Company, 38th Infantry: Capt. John Buck; Company, 38th Infantry: Capt. Sheppard C. Leakin; Company, 38th Infantry: Capt. Charles Stansbury; Det. 1st Regiment of Artillery, Maryland Militia; Washington Artillery: Capt. John Berry; Baltimore Independent Artillerists: Lt. Charles Pennington; Baltimore Fencibles: Capt. Joseph H. Nicholson; Det. U.S. Chesapeake Flotilla: Sailing Master Solomon Rodman
Harbor defenses of Baltimore: Maj. George Armistead	Fort Covington	Det. U.S. Navy: Lt. Henry S. Newcomb
Harbor defenses of Baltimore: Maj. George Armistead	Fort Babcock	Det. U.S. Chesapeake Flotilla: Sailing Master John A. Webster
Harbor defenses of Baltimore: Maj. George Armistead	Fort Lookout	Det. U.S. Navy: Lt. George Budd
Harbor defenses of Baltimore: Maj. George Armistead	Lazaretto Battery	Det. U.S. Chesapeake Flotilla: Lt. Solomon Frazier
Harbor defenses of Baltimore: Maj. George Armistead	Gun Barges	Det. U.S. Chesapeake Flotilla: Lt. Solomon Rutter
Hampstead Hill defenses	US Navy: Commodore John Rodgers	Det. U.S Navy; Det. U.S. Marines
Hampstead Hill defenses	Virginia Militia: Major Gen. John Pegram (Note: Neimeyer states that the Virginia militia division was under Maj. Gen. John Pegram (of the War of 1812, not to be confused with his grandson, Confederate Brig. Gen. John Pegram.)	Brig. Gen. Singleton; Brig. Gen. Douglass
Hampstead Hill defenses	Pennsylvania Militia	Col. Frailey's Battalion; Lt. Col. Alexander Cobean's Battalion

=== British ===
- North America and West Indies Station: Vice Admiral Alexander Cochrane
- Rear-Admiral Pulteney Malcolm
- Rear-Admiral Edward Codrington - Captain of the Fleet

Naval forces	Bombardment squadron	Ship
Vice Admiral Sir Alexander Cochrane, RN	Bomb vessels	HMS Meteor: Capt. Thomas Alexander; HMS Volcano: Capt. David Price; HMS Aetna: Capt. Richard Kennah; HMS Devastation: Capt. Samuel Roberts; HMS Terror: Capt. John Sheridan
Vice Admiral Sir Alexander Cochrane, RN	Rocket ship	HMS Erebus: Capt. David Bartholomew
Vice Admiral Sir Alexander Cochrane, RN	Frigates	HMS Surprise: Capt. Thomas Cochrane; HMS Severn; HMS Euryalus: Capt. Charles Napier; HMS Hebrus: Capt. Edmund Palmer; HMS Madagascar; HMS Havannah; HMS Seahorse: Capt. James Gordon
Vice Admiral Sir Alexander Cochrane, RN	Schooners	HMS Cockchafer; HMS Wolverine; HMS Rover

British forces	Brigade	Regiment
Maj. Gen. Sir Robert Ross (KIA, 9/12): Col. Arthur Brooke	First (Light) Brigade: Maj. Timothy Jones	85th Regiment: Maj. Richard Gubbins; Light Company, 1/4th Regiment: Maj. Timothy Jones; Light Company, 21st Regiment: Maj. Norman Pringle; Light Company, 1/44th Regiment
Maj. Gen. Sir Robert Ross (KIA, 9/12): Col. Arthur Brooke	Second Brigade: Col. Arthur Brooke; Lt. Col. Thomas Mullins	1st battalion 4th Regiment: Maj. Alured Faunce; 1st battalion 44th Regiment: Maj. John Johnson; Provisional Marine Battalion from the Fleet: Capt. John Robyns, RM
Maj. Gen. Sir Robert Ross (KIA, 9/12): Col. Arthur Brooke	Third Brigade: Lt. Col. William Patterson	21st Regiment: Maj. John Whitaker; 2nd Battalion, Royal Marines: Lt. Col. James Malcolm, RM; plus 283 Marines from the fleet; 3rd Battalion, Royal & Colonial Marines: Maj. George Lewis, RM; plus 107 Marines from HMS Seahorse and HMS Havannah
Maj. Gen. Sir Robert Ross (KIA, 9/12): Col. Arthur Brooke	Reporting directly	Royal Marine Artillery: 1st Lt. John Lawrence, RM; Royal Artillery: Capt. John Mitchell; Detachment, Royal Artillery Drivers: Capt. William Lempiere; 2nd Coy. 4th Battalion, Royal Sappers and Miners: Capt. Richard Blanchard
Rear Admiral Sir George Cockburn	Naval Brigade	Naval Brigade Seaman: Capt. Edward Crofton, RN; Capt. Joseph Nourse, RN - HMS Severn; Comr. Thomas Ball Sulivan, RN - HMS Weser; Comr. Rowland Money, RN - HMS Trave; Comr. Robert Ramsay, RN - HMS Regulus

== Battle ==
=== North Point ===
A map of Baltimore and Fort McHenry, 1814

The British landed a force of 5,000 troops who marched toward Baltimore and first met heavy resistance at the Battle of North Point, which was fought on September 12 about 5 miles (8.0 km) from the city. The city's defense was under the overall command of Major General Smith, an officer of the Maryland Militia. He dispatched roughly 3,000 men under the command of General John Stricker to meet the British in a forward engagement. General Stricker was to stall the British invasion force to delay the British advance long enough for Major General Smith to complete the defenses in Baltimore.

The land invasion force for the British was led by Ross, who was killed in the second shift of the American defense by an American sharpshooter. It has been suggested that either Daniel Wells or Henry McComas of Captain Aisquith's rifle company, of the 5th Maryland Militia regiment was responsible, and both were killed shortly afterwards.

After Ross's death, command of the British Army fell to Colonel Arthur Brooke. The Americans had already begun to form an organized retreat back to the main defenses of Baltimore, where they awaited a British assault.

=== Hampstead Hill ===
Rodgers Bastion, also known as Sheppard's Bastion, located on Hampstead Hill, now part of Patterson Park, was the centerpiece of a 3-mile (4.8 km)-wide earthworks from the outer harbor in Canton, north to Belair Road, dug to defend the eastern approach to Baltimore against the British. The redoubt was assembled and commanded by United States Navy Commodore John Rodgers, with General Smith in command of the overall line. At dawn on September 13, the day after the Battle of North Point, some 4,300 British troops advanced north on North Point Road, then west along the Philadelphia Road (now Maryland Route 7) toward Baltimore. U.S. troops were forced to retreat to the main defensive line around the city. The British commander, Colonel Brooke, established his new headquarters at the Sterret House on Surrey Farm, now called Armistead Gardens, about two miles east-northeast of Hampstead Hill.

When the British began probing actions on Baltimore's inner defenses, the American line was defended by 100 cannons and more than 10,000 regular troops, including two shadowing infantry regiments commanded by general officers Stricker and William H. Winder as well as a few thousand local militia and irregulars. The defenses were far stronger than the British anticipated. The American defenders at Fort McHenry successfully stopped British naval forces but a few ships were still able to provide artillery support.

Once the British had taken the outer defenses, the inner defenses became the priority. The British infantry had not anticipated how well defended they would be, so the first attack was a failure. However, Brooke's forces managed to outflank and to overrun American positions to the right. After a discussion with lower ranking officers, Brooke decided that the British should bombard the fort instead of risk a frontal assault and, at 3:00 a.m. on September 14, ordered the British troops to return to the ships.

=== Fort McHenry ===
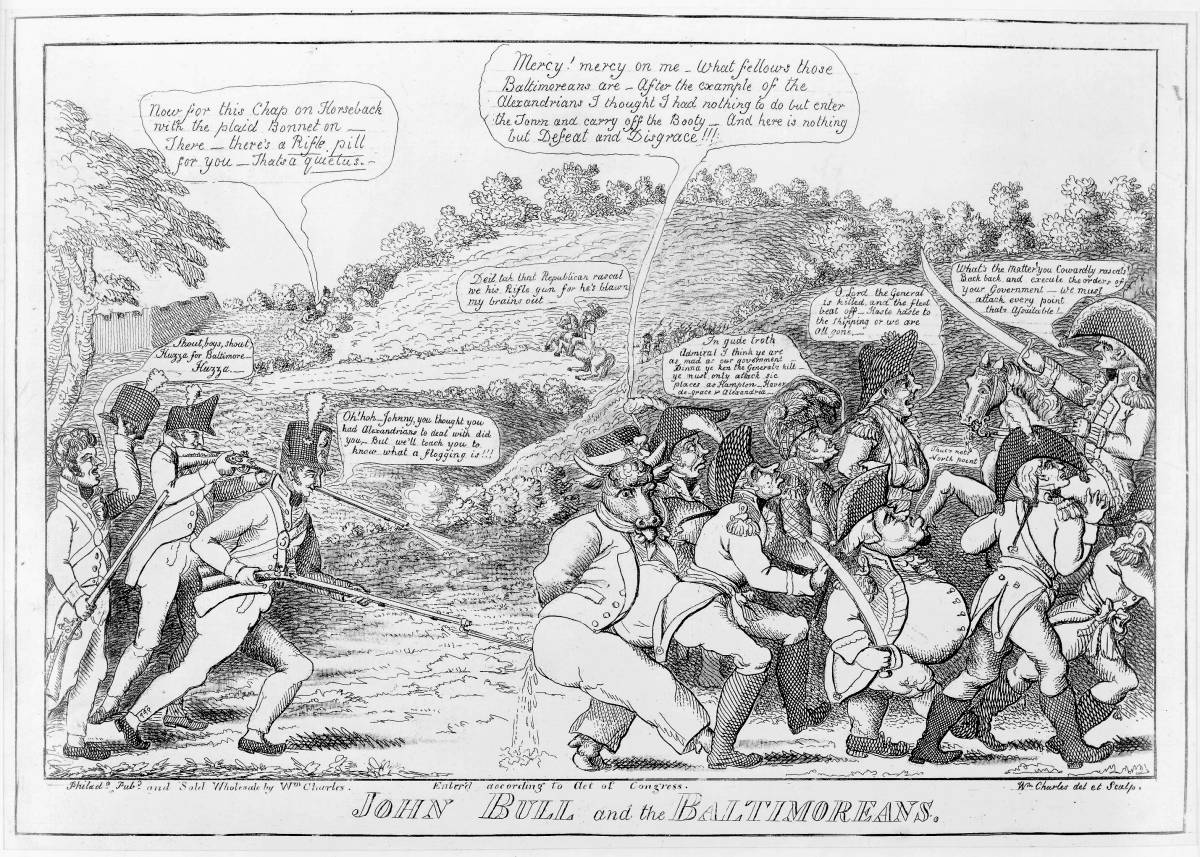
John Bull and the Baltimoreans (1814) by William Charles, a cartoon praising the stiff resistance in Baltimore

At Fort McHenry, some 1,000 soldiers under the command of Major George Armistead awaited the British naval bombardment. Their defense was augmented by the sinking of a line of American merchant ships at the adjacent entrance to Baltimore Harbor in order to further thwart the passage of British ships.

The attack began on September 13, as the British fleet of some nineteen ships began pounding the fort with Congreve rockets (from rocket vessel HMS Erebus) and mortar shells (from bomb vessels Terror, Volcano, Meteor, Devastation, and Aetna). After an initial exchange of fire, the British fleet withdrew to just beyond the range of Fort McHenry's cannons and continued to bombard the American redoubts for the next 25 hours. Although 1,500 to 1,800 cannonballs were launched at the fort, damage was light because of recent fortification that had been completed prior to the battle.

After nightfall, Cochrane ordered a landing to be made by small boats to the shore just west of the fort, away from the harbor opening on which the fort's defense was concentrated. He hoped that the landing party might slip past Fort McHenry and draw Smith's army away from the main British land assault on the city's eastern border. That gave the British a good diversion for half an hour and allowed them to fire again and again.

On the morning of September 14, the 30 ft × 42 ft (9.1 m × 12.8 m) oversized American flag, which had been made a year earlier by local flagmaker Mary Pickersgill and her 13-year-old daughter, was raised over Fort McHenry, replacing the tattered storm flag which had flown during battle. It was responded to by a small encampment of British riflemen on the right flank, who fired a round each at the sky and taunted the Americans just before they too returned to the shore line. Originally, historians said that the oversized Star Spangled Banner Flag was raised to taunt the British, but that is not the case. The oversized flag was used every morning for reveille, as was the case on the morning of September 14.

Brooke had been instructed not to attack the American positions around Baltimore unless he was certain that there were fewer than 2,000 men in the fort. Because of his orders, Brooke had to withdraw from his positions and returned to the fleet, which would set sail for New Orleans.

== Aftermath ==
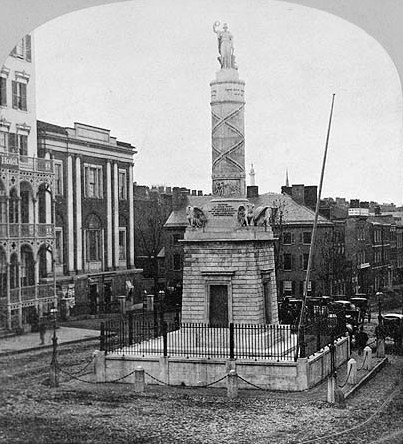
Battle Monument, Baltimore

Colonel Brooke's troops withdrew, and Admiral Cochrane's fleet sailed off to regroup before his next (and final) assault on the United States, at the Battle of New Orleans. Armistead was soon promoted to lieutenant colonel. Much weakened by the arduous preparations for the battle, he died at 38, only three years after the battle.

Three active battalions of the Regular Army (1-4 Inf, 2-4 Inf and 3-4 Inf) perpetuate the lineages of the old 36th and 38th Infantry Regiments, both of which were at Fort McHenry during the bombardment. The lineage of the 5th Maryland Infantry Regiment, which played a major role in the Battle of North Point, is perpetuated by the Maryland Army National Guard's 175th Infantry Regiment.

The battle is commemorated in the Fort McHenry National Monument and Historic Shrine.

=== Star Spangled Banner ===
An American lawyer and amateur poet, Francis Scott Key, was on a mercy mission for the release of Dr. William Beanes, a prisoner of the British. Key showed the British letters from wounded British officers praising the care that they received from Dr. Beanes. The British agreed to release Beanes, but Key and Beanes were forced to stay with the British until the attack on Baltimore was over.

Key watched the proceedings from a truce ship in the Patapsco River. On the morning of the 14th, Key saw the American flag waving above Fort McHenry. Inspired, he began jotting down verses on the back of a letter he was carrying. Key's poem, originally named "Defence of Fort M'Henry", was printed on pamphlets by the Baltimore American.

Key's poem was later set to the tune of a British song called "To Anacreon in Heaven", the official song of the Anacreontic Society, an 18th-century gentlemen's club of amateur musicians in London. The song eventually became known as "The Star-Spangled Banner". The US Congress made it the national anthem of the United States in 1931.

== See also ==
- Defenders Day
- The Dawn's Early Light
- Bombardment of Lewes
- List of conflicts in the United States

== Sources and further reading ==
- Borneman, Walter R. (2004). 1812: The War That Forged a Nation. New York: Harper Perennial. ISBN 978-0-06-053112-6.
- Crawford, Michael J.; Hughes, Christine F., eds. (2002). The Naval War of 1812: A Documentary History, Vol. 3 (PDF). Washington: Naval Historical Center (GPO). ISBN 978-0-16-051224-7.
- Cruikshank, Ernest (2006) [1814]. The Documentary History of the campaign upon the Niagara frontier. (Part 1–2). University of Calgary. Archived from the original on May 27, 2011.
- George, Christopher T., Terror on the Chesapeake: The War of 1812 on the Bay, Shippensburg, Pa.: White Mane, 2001, ISBN 1-57249-276-7
- Hildebrand, David K. "Bicentenary Essay: Two National Anthems? Some Reflections on the Two Hundredth Anniversary of 'The Star-Spangled Banner' and its Forgotten Partner, 'The Battle of Baltimore'." American Music 32.3 (2014): 253–271. online
- James, William (1818). A Full and Correct Account of the Military Occurrences of the Late War Between Great Britain and the United States of America. Volume II. London: Published for the Author. ISBN 0-665-35743-5.
- Leepson, Marc. What So Proudly We Hailed: Francis Scott Key, A Life, New York: Palgrave Macmillan, 2014. ISBN 978-1137278289
- Leepson, Marc. "Flag: An American Biography", New York: Thomas Dunne Books, 2005. ISBN 978-0312323080
- Liston, Kathy Lee Erlandson (2006). "Where Are the British Soldiers Killed in the Battle of North Point Buried?". Fort Howard, MD: Myedgemere.com, LLC. Archived from the original on November 26, 2010.
- Lord, Walter (1972). The Dawn's Early Light. New York: W.W. Norton. ISBN 0-393-05452-7.
- Marine, William M. (1913). The British invasion of Maryland, 1812–1815. Baltimore: Society of the War of 1812 in Maryland
- Morriss, Roger (1997). Cockburn and the British Navy in Transition: Admiral Sir George Cockburn, 1772–1853. Columbia: University of South Carolina Press. ISBN 978-1-57003-253-0. OCLC 1166924740.
- Neimeyer, Charles P. (2014). The Chesapeake Campaign, 1813–1814 (PDF). Washington, D.C.: Center of Military History, United States Army. LCCN 2014489196. Archived from the original (PDF) on November 10, 2024.
- Pitch, Anthony S. The Burning of Washington, Annapolis: Naval Institute Press, 2000. ISBN 1-55750-425-3
- Swanson, Neil Harmon (1945). The Perilous Fight. New York: Farrar and Rinehart. OCLC 610291946.
- Sheads, Scott S. The Rockets' Red Glare: The Maritime Defense of Baltimore in 1814 (Tidewater Publishers, 1986).
- Taylor, Matthew (2026). Black Redcoats: The Corps of Colonial Marines (second ed.). Barnsley, Yorkshire: Pen and Sword Books. ISBN 978-1-39-903402-9.
- Whitehorne, Joseph A., The Battle for Baltimore 1814, Baltimore: Nautical & Aviation Publishing, 1997, ISBN 1-877853-23-2
