= Eliza (1802 Philadelphia ship) =

History

Great Britain
- Name: Eliza
- Builder: Philadelphia
- Launched: 1792
- Fate: Last listed in 1820

General characteristics
- Tons burthen: 126, or 135 (bm)
- Sail plan: Brig
- Complement: 1803:30; 1805:35; 1805:41; 1806:30; 1806:30
- Armament: 1803:10 × 6-pounder guns; 1805:8 × 6-pounder guns + 6 × 9-pounder carronades; 1806:12 × 9-pounder carronades; 1806:12 × 9-pounder carronades

Eliza was launched in Philadelphia in 1792 and came into British ownership in 1802. She was briefly a privateer sailing out of Liverpool. A highly valuable prize that she captured in 1805, in company with another privateer, resulted in a court case in which Eliza's captain successfully sued a captain in the British Royal Navy for having pressed some of her crew. Eliza spent the great bulk of her career as a merchantman, either as a coaster or in sailing between England and the western coast of the Iberian Peninsula. She was last listed in 1820.

== Career ==
Eliza entered Lloyd's Register (LR) in 1802 with B.Dunn, master, Fetado & Co., owners, and trade London–Tortola. Lloyd's Register reported her origin as Spain. However, Lloyd's Register may have been conflating her origins with another Eliza, the name being a common one. By 1804 Lloyd's Register changed her origin to Philadelphia and her burthen to 126 tons (bm), from 135.

After the resumption of war with France, Eliza briefly became a privateer, based in Liverpool. Captain Samuel Cattrall acquired a letter of marque on 23 July 1803.

| Year | Master | Owner | Trade | Source |
|---|---|---|---|---|
| 1803 | B.Dunn; S.Cattrall | Fetado & Co. Brockelbank | London–St Thomas; Liverpool privateer | LR |
| 1804 | Brockelbank; S.Cattrall | Brockelbank | Cork–Liverpool; Liverpool–Saint Michael | LR |

Lloyd's List (LL) reported on 13 January 1804 that Eliza, of Liverpool, Cattrall, master, had taken Rein Deer, from Batavia to Rotterdam. Rein Deer came into Cork.

=== Prize and court case ===
Captain John Keene acquired a letter of marque on 23 January 1805. He did not appear in either Lloyd's Register or the Register of Shipping between 1804 and 1806. His tenure as captain of Eliza was short, but lucrative.

Lloyd's List reported that on 5 April 1805 Eliza, Keen, master, and the lugger Greyhound, of Guernsey, had captured the Spanish ship Dos Amigos, sailing from Lima to Cadiz. Dos Amigos, of 700 tons (bm), was armed with ten 18-pounder guns and had a crew of 90 men. She was carrying a cargo with an estimated value of £200,000. She arrived at Falmouth, Cornwall, on 28 April. (Note: Greyhound, Philip LeLbirel, master, of 110 tons (bm), was armed with two 4-pounder guns and ten 9-pounder carronades. LeLbirel had acquired a letter of marque on 23 January 1805.) Eliza, Keen, master, arrived back at Liverpool from her cruize on 28 May.

The cargo, when inventoried, amounted to 179,935 dollars, 473 marks of worked silver, 561 chests of cascarilla, 54 bags 3 serons of wool, 40 serons of sea-wolf skins, 9 serons of indigo, one chest of drugs, 17,507 cargas of Guayaquil cocoa, 1,745 bars of copper, and 3,398 bars of pewter. The whole turned out to be worth upwards of £151,000.

A court case arose out of the division of the prize money. In March Euryalus, Captain Henry Blackwood, had pressed four men of the 41 men and boys on Eliza. Eliza' owners sued Blackwood for £3000, contending that because Blackwood had ignored the Admiralty Certificate of Protection covering Eliza's crew, this had ended up costing the owners that much in prize money by reducing their share of the proceeds. The owners of Eliza and Greyhound were entitled to three-quarters of the prize money, and had agreed to share any prize money in proportion to the sizes of the two crews; the pressing of four crew members had reduced the share of the prize money going to Eliza's owners. Despite the judge's leading instructions to the jury that emphasized Blackwood's service to England and defects in Eliza's paperwork, the jury found for the plaintiffs, awarding them £2888 10s 6d.

| Year | Master | Owner | Trade | Source |
|---|---|---|---|---|
| 1805 | S.Cattrall; H.Barnes | Brockelbank | Liverpool–Saint Michael | LR |
| 1806 | H.Barnes | Brockelbank | Cork–St Michael | LR |

Captain Henry Barnes acquired a letter of marque on 22 May 1806.

Captain John Hughes acquired a letter of marque on 7 June 1806. Lloyd's List reported on 1 July 1806 that the privateer Eliza had taken Anna Margaretta, a Dane, Pedersen, master, sailing from Teneriffe to Tonningen and sent her into Falmouth. On 30 September Eliza, Hughes, master, returned to Liverpool from a cruize.

| Year | Master | Owner | Trade | Source |
|---|---|---|---|---|
| 1807 | H.Barnes; Grocot | Brockelbank | Cork–St Michael; London–Norway | LR |
| 1808 | R.Grocot; J.Leich | Brockelbank | London–Norway | LR |
| 1809 | R.Grocot; J.Leich | Brockelbank | Liverpool–Oporto; London–Cadiz | LR |
| 1810 | J.Leich; D.Aubin | Brockelbank | London–Cadiz | LR |
| 1815 | Brockelbank | Brockelbank | Liverpool–Oporto | LR |
| 1820 | Brockelbank | Hibson & Co. | Liverpool–Portugal | Register of Shipping; small repairs 1811 |
