= Rocket vessel =

Type of nautical vessel

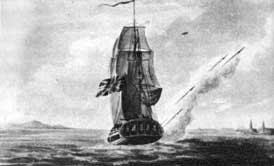
A ship firing Congreve rockets

A rocket vessel was a ship equipped with rockets as a weapon. The most famous ship of this type was HMS Erebus, which at the Battle of Baltimore in 1814 provided the "rockets' red glare" that was memorialized by Francis Scott Key in The Star-Spangled Banner.

Rocket vessels were also used by the Royal Navy in the attack on the French fleet at Boulogne-sur-Mer in 1806 and at the second Battle of Copenhagen in 1807. At the Battle of the Basque Roads in 1809, there were no less than three vessels participating that had been fitted to throw rockets: two hired armed cutters King George and Nimrod, and the schooner Whiting.

The Congreve rockets of this period were highly inaccurate and unreliable, and were primarily used as a psychological weapon of terror in conjunction with other, more effective, weapons, such as mortar shells thrown by bomb vessels.

The Erebus was equipped with a 32-pound rocket battery installed below the main deck, which fired through portholes or scuttles pierced in the ship's side. Some of the other rocket vessels used by the Royal Navy were small boats, rather than ships. These carried a rocket launcher frame supported by a mast and raised and lowered by means of halyards.

Modern warships carry a variety of rocket-powered missile weapons. Dedicated rocket ships were also occasionally used in the 20th century, such as the Landing Craft Tank (Rocket) used to support amphibious assaults in WWII.
