= HMS Erebus (1807) =

Sloop of the Royal Navy

- HMS Erebus body plan

History

United Kingdom
- Name: HMS Erebus
- Ordered: 1 October 1805
- Builder: Thomas Owen, Topsham
- Laid down: January 1806
- Launched: 20 August 1807
- Honours and awards: Naval General Service Medal with clasp "The Potomac 17 Augt. 1814"
- Fate: Broken up 22 July 1819

General characteristics
- Class & type: Thais-class fireship
- Tons burthen: 424 (bm)
- Length: Overall: 108 ft 9 in (33.1 m); Keel: 90 ft 6 in (27.6 m)
- Beam: 29 ft 8 in (9.0 m)
- Depth of hold: 9 ft 0 in (2.7 m)
- Sail plan: Sloop
- Complement: 121
- Armament: Upper deck: 16 × 24-pounder carronades; QD: 6 × 18-pounder carronades; Fc: 2 × 18-pounder carronades + 2 × 9-pounder guns; Lower deck: 32-pound Congreve rockets

HMS Erebus was originally built as a Royal Navy fireship, but served as a sloop and was re-rated as such in March 1808. She served in the Baltic during the Gunboat and Anglo-Russian Wars, where in 1809 she was briefly converted to a fireship, and then served in the War of 1812. In 1814 she was converted to a rocket vessel to fire Congreve rockets. While serving off America, Erebus participated in the sack of Alexandria, Virginia, and launched the rockets that bombarded Fort McHenry in Baltimore on 13 September 1814. In March 1815, off Georgia, she fired the second-to-the-last-shot of the war. She was laid up in 1816 and sold for breaking up in 1819.

== Baltic ==
Commander William Autridge commissioned Erebus in January 1808, and she sailed for the Baltic in April.

In July, Vice-Admiral Sir James Saumarez and his British fleet were blockading Rager Vik (Ragerswik or Rogerswick or Russian: Baltiyskiy) where the Russian fleet was sheltering after the British 74-gun third rates Implacable and Centaur had destroyed the Russian 74-gun ship of the line Vsevolod.

Saumarez wanted to attack the fleet and ordered that Erebus and Baltic be prepared as fireships. However, when the British discovered that the Russians had stretched a defensive chain across the entrance to the harbour, precluding an attack by fireships, Saumarez abandoned the plan and the two vessels returned to normal duties.

Between 28 October and 9 November, Erebus captured the Danish sloops Debitor, Ellen Maria and Rengende Jacob. On 28 October Erebus captured the Danish galliot Emanuel. On 29 November Erebus and Devastation captured the Danish galliots Ellen Maria, Gertrude Maria and Fem Sodskende. Between 30 November and 6 December, Erebus captured the Danish vessels Neptunus, Neptunus and Frau Maria.

At some point Commander Henry Withy assumed command. On 4 August 1809, Captain Thomas Byam Martin of Implacable, while off Hogland, assigned Erebus to patrol between Aspo and Sommars rock. Her mission was to harry Russian shipping and give warning should she spot the Russian fleet exiting Kronstadt.

On 24 October Erebus, again under the command of Autridge, captured the Courier. Almost a month later, on 16 November, Rose, with Erebus in company, captured the Concordia. That day Rose was in company with Erebus, the cutter Cheerful and the hired armed cutter Mary when they captured the Catherine Elizabeth.

The next day Erebus captured four vessels. One was the Chriftina, N. Jorgensen (or Jergensen), master. Erebus was in company with Rose when they captured the Danish sloop Anna Catherina, H.P. Larsen, master. Rose, Cheerful and Mary were in sight as Erebus captured the Twende Brodre, H. Holmer, master. Rose was also in company when she and Erebus captured the Danish sloop Anna Margaretha.

On 29 December Erebus captured the Crown schooner No. 27. The next day Erebus captured the Elizabeth Christina. The day after that Erebus captured the Victoria, Hans Larsen, late master.

Erebus was employed on convoy duties and on 21 June 1810 she and Loire escorted 100 vessels through the Great Belt into the Baltic. On 6 July 1810, Erebus captured the Vrou Sitske. On 28 July Erebus captured the Maria, J. Schumacha, master. Then on 13 August she captured the Maria Sophia, J.C. Guhlstoff, master.

Erebus was at Hull on 2 October, having just detained the Hopper, Somanberg, and Maria Sofie Guhlstorff, from Saint Petersburg. On 17 December 1811, Erebus captured the Danish sloop Fuldmannen, A. Anderson, master.

In 1812 Erebus was again employed on convoy escort in the Baltic under Saumarez. On 12 May Erebus, under the command of Commander George Brine, the Danish sloop Snelvegen. Then on 25 May Erebus recaptured the Diverdina.

On 15 June Erebus, again under the command of William Autridge, captured the Danish sloop Henrietta, Anders Jergensen, master. On 18 August 1812, Commander Henry Lyford took command and served on her until he was made post-captain on 4 December 1813.

On 4 October Podargus captured the Danish sloop Speculation and shared the prize money with Persian, Erebus, Woodlark and Plover by agreement. Then on 17 October Persian and Erebus were again in company with Podargus when Podargus captured the Danish vessels Anna Maria, Twende Brodre, and two market-boats. Next month, on 11 November Podargus captured Syerstadt, with Persian and Erebus in company. On 16 December Persian captured the Danish galliot Ebenetzer, with Thracian in company. Erebus shared in the prize money by agreement with Persian.

On 27 July 1813 Sheldrake, Erebus, Thracian, and Woodlark captured the Forsoget, Stephanus, and Erskine. Prize money was paid on 15 January 1819. Then on 20 October Ariel, Erebus, and Hamadryad captured the Venus. Prize money for this vessel too was paid on 15 January 1819. After Lyford, Erebus then came under the command of Commander John Forbes.

== War of 1812 ==
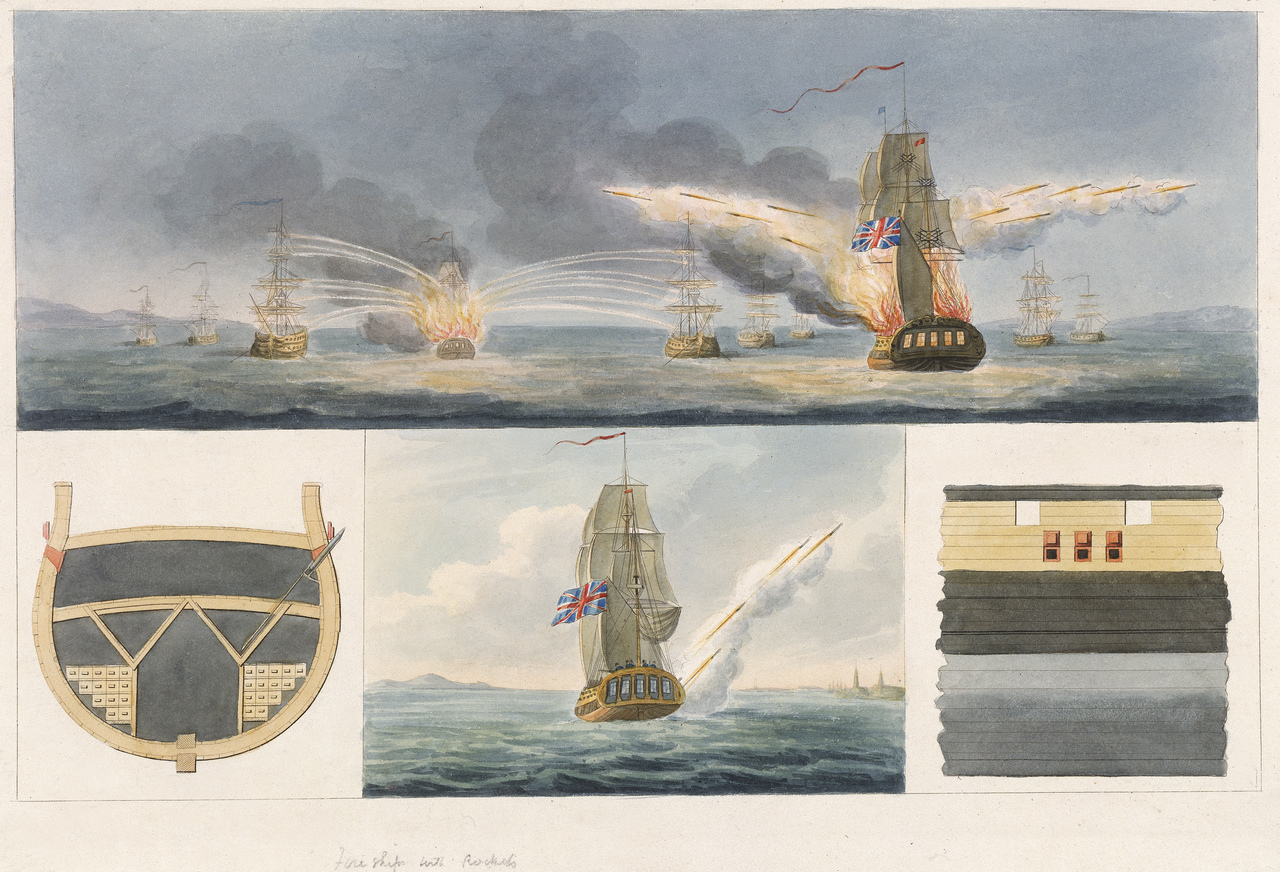
1814 depiction of rockets being fired

In early 1814, during the War of 1812, while under the command of John Forbes, Erebus was again in Baltic. However, in April, while under Commander David Ewen Bartholomew, she was at Woolwich, fitting as a Congreve rocket ship and for the North American station. She was equipped with a battery of 32-pound Congreve rockets installed below the main deck, which fired through portholes or scuttles pierced in the ship's side. This was an improved version of the design that Congreve had first installed in HMS Galgo. On 23 May Erebus attempted to leave Portsmouth for the North American station but contrary winds forced her to put back. Still, on 29 May she was at Cork and got underway with the convoy for Newfoundland, Halifax and Quebec.

=== Potomac ===
On 17 August 1814, Vice-Admiral Alexander Cochrane detached Devastation, Euryalus, Ætna, Meteor, Manly and Erebus, all under Captain Alexander Gordon in Seahorse, to go up the Potomac and bombard Fort Washington, which was on the left bank of the river, some ten or twelve miles below Washington itself. The British suffered from several disadvantages. First, they lacked pilots that knew the Kettle-Bottoms, a difficult stretch of the river. Second, the winds blew in the wrong direction, slowing their advance. Consequently, it took them ten days to reach the fort, and during the journey all the ships grounded at least 20 times. For five successive days they had to warp over a distance of 50 miles.

On the evening of 27 August the bomb vessels started bombarding Fort Washington. This caused the garrison to flee. However, suspecting trickery, Captain Gordon ordered the vessels to continue to fire, only ceasing when the powder magazine exploded at eight o'clock.

The following morning the British occupied the defenses. The principal fort contained two 52-pounder, two 32-pounder and eight 24-pounder guns. On the beach there was also battery of five 18-pounders; there was also a Martello tower with two 12-pounders and a battery in the rear with two 12 and six 6-pound field guns. Before they fled the Americans had spiked the guns; the British landing party of seamen and marines completed the destruction, especially of the gun carriages. The loss of the forts and batteries left the town of Alexandria undefended.

Between 31 August and 6 September Erebus and the squadron continued on the Potomac River. They took Alexandria and also captured 21 merchant vessels. While there the British looted stores and warehouses of 16,000 barrels of flour, 1,000 hogsheads of tobacco, 150 bales of cotton and some $5,000 worth of wine, sugar and other items.

The Americans had placed two field guns in a battery situated high on a bluff at White House Plantation (modern day Fort Belvoir), and had fired on Fairy as she sailed to reach Gordon. On 1 September, Gordon sent Fairy and Meteor to engage the battery to impede its completion, but they were unsuccessful. In all, the Americans had established batteries with a total of 11 guns - five naval long guns and eight artillery field pieces.

The British spent most of 2 September mustering their ships and prizes for the run down river while awaiting favourable winds. At the same time they were working to free Devastation, which had run aground.

On 3 September the bomb vessel Ætna and Erebus joined in the effort to suppress the American batteries. That same day, Commodore John Rodgers, with four U.S. gunboats and some fireships, made an unsuccessful attempt to destroy Devastation. Sniping and gunfire continued throughout 4 and 5 September, as the Virginia militia arrived to block British landings at the batteries.

On 6 September the frigates Seahorse and Euryalus came down the river and joined Fairy. The three vessels shifted their ballast to the port side to enable their combined 63 starboard guns to elevate sufficiently to engage the batteries. They then opened fire and within 45 minutes had silenced the American cannons.

All eight British warships and their prizes, 22 merchant vessels, brigs, ships and schooners, moved back to the main fleet. During the run down the river the British had suffered only seven dead and 35 wounded, including Charles Dickson, Fairy's second lieutenant. However, Erebus alone lost one man killed and 16 men wounded; two died, eight were severely wounded and Commander Bartholomew, Lieutenant Reuben Paine and four others were slightly wounded. The Admiralty issued the Naval General Service Medal with the clasp "The Potomac 17 Augt. 1814" to those members of the vessels' crews that had survived to 1847.

=== Baltimore ===
Erebus was one of the ships involved in the bombardment of Fort McHenry in the Battle of Baltimore.

Erebus, Meteor, Ætna, Terror, Volcano, and Devastation moved up the Patapsco River on 12 September 1814 in preparation for an attack on Baltimore. They commenced their bombardment on Fort McHenry and the water batteries on 13 September, but were ordered to withdraw the next day. It was fire from Erebus that provided the "rockets' red glare" that Francis Scott Key described in The Star-Spangled Banner.

=== Georgia ===
After the defeat at the Battle of New Orleans, Edward Nicolls embarked the Erebus on 12 January at Cat Island Roads. They departed on 21 January, and disembarked at Apalachicola on 25 January 1815. Cochrane sent the transports Mars and Florida, accompanied by the Erebus, with gifts for the Indians and provisions for the garrison at Prospect Bluff. A draft of Royal Marine reinforcements and a Company of the West India Regiment were disembarked. Despite having arrived on 23 January, the disembarkation was not completed until 28 January 1815.

Erebus was with Sir George Cockburn's squadron off Georgia. On 22 February 1815 she contributed her boats to a force of 186 seamen and marines under Captain Phillott of Primrose. This force then proceeded to sail up the St Mary's River to attack an American detachment.

The force had navigated fairly far up river when they came under unexpected fire from Spanish Florida. The British soon silenced the fire, but Phillott decided to retreat as the river ahead was narrow (only 30 to 40 yards wide), with commanding heights and houses to their rear. During the withdrawal, the expedition was exposed to harassing fire for over ten hours. In all, the expedition cost the British three men killed and 15 wounded. Bartholomew, of Erebus, was hit four times. He took his first hit in his head and then a second ball hit his middle finger and thumb when he put his hand up to feel the first wound. He was also hit in the neck and throat. Phillott too was wounded twice.

On 16 March 1815 Erebus fired the second-to-the-last shot of the war when she fired a shot at Gunboat No. 168 in Wassaw Sound, off Georgia, even though Bartholomew knew the war was over and the gunboat's master, Mr. John H. Hurlburd, had announced that he was carrying letters for Cockburn. No. 168 fired one shot pro forma across the bows of Erebus and then struck. When Hurlburd came aboard Erebus, Bartholomew apologized and stated that he had not given any order to fire. Fortunately, Erebus's shot had been fired high and had only done a little damage to some ropes and the sail on No. 168.

== Fate ==
Erebus returned to England on 28 April. Bartholomew received promotion to post-captain on 13 June, but remained with Erebus until after she had assisted in the repatriation via Ostend of the British wounded from Waterloo. Still, in June 1815 Erebus came under the command of Commander Francis le Hunte.

On 25 June and again on 5 July Erebus and Foxhound arrived at Deal from Ostend with French prisoners. On the first trip she convoyed transports that between them were carrying 8,000 French prisoners.

Erebus was laid up at Deptford in 1816. The Admiralty sold her on 22 July 1819 for £1,150 to Mr. Manlove for breaking up.
