= HMS Starr (1805) =

Sloop of the Royal Navy

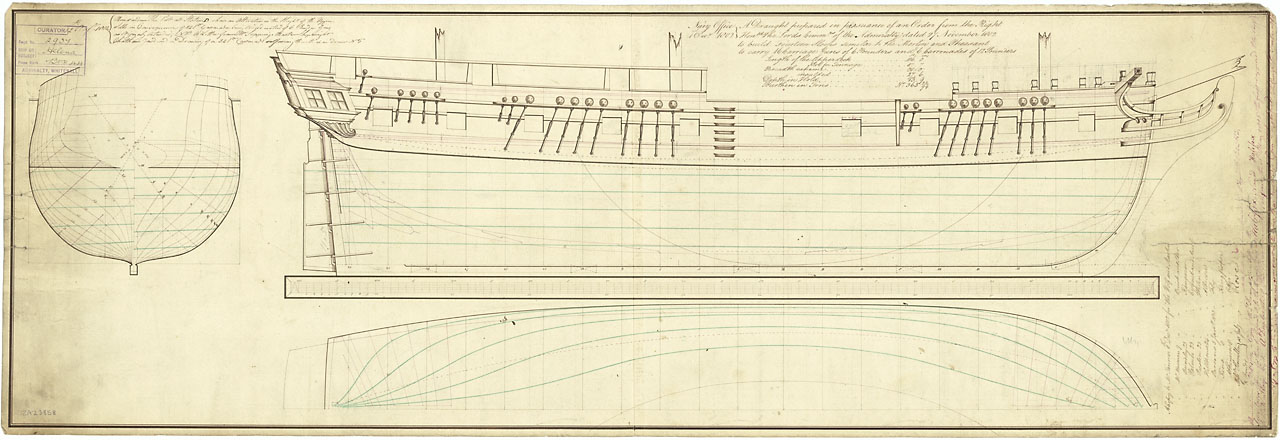
- Star, plan of the original 1805 build

History

United Kingdom
- Name: HMS Starr
- Ordered: 27 November 1802
- Builder: Benjamin Tanner of Dartmouth
- Laid down: July 1804
- Launched: 26 July 1805
- Commissioned: 3 November 1805 at Plymouth
- Renamed: HMS Meteor in 1812
- Honours and awards: Naval General Service Medal with clasps: "Martinique"; "14 Dec. Boat Service 1814"
- Fate: Sold 16 October 1816

General characteristics
- Class & type: Merlin-class ship sloop
- Tons burthen: 36532/94 (bm)
- Length: 106 ft (32.3 m) (gundeck); 87 ft 7 in (26.7 m) (keel)
- Beam: 28 ft (8.5 m)
- Depth of hold: 13 ft 9 in (4.2 m)
- Sail plan: Full-rigged ship
- Complement: 121
- Armament: As sloop: 16 × 32-pounder carronades + 8 × 6-pounder guns; As bomb vessel: 8 × 24-pounder carronades + 2 × 6-pounder guns + 10-inch mortar + 13-inch mortar

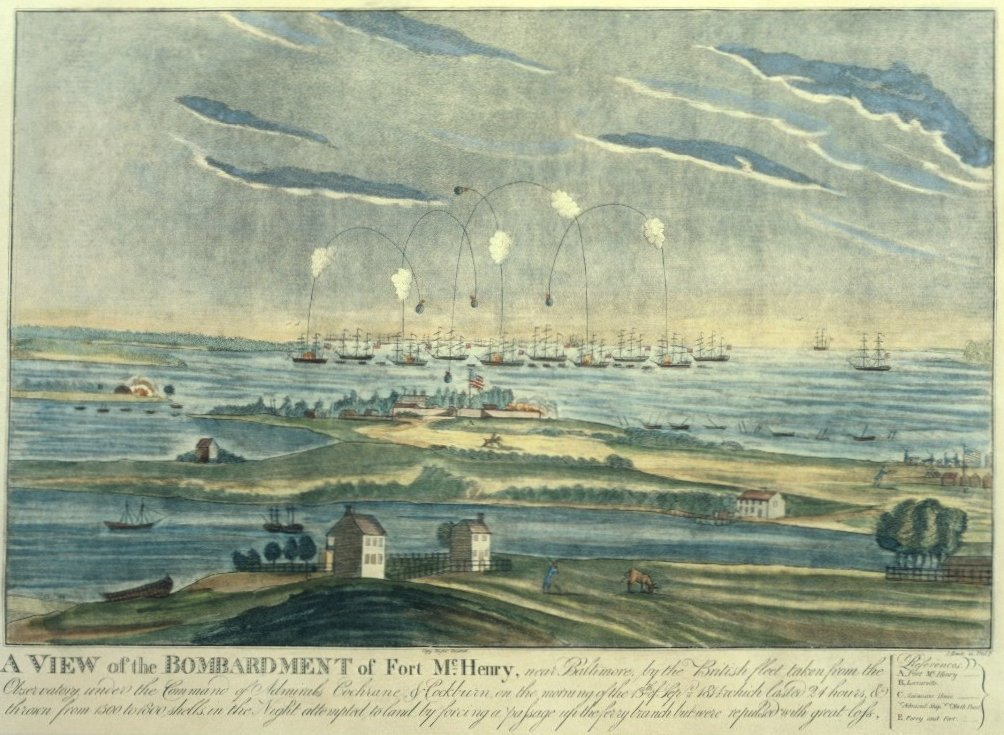
The Bombardment of Fort McHenry, showing Royal Navy bomb vessels in action, including HMS Meteor (ex-Starr)

HMS Starr was a 16-gun Merlin-class ship sloop of the Royal Navy. She was built by Tanner, of Dartmouth, to plans by Sir William Rule, and launched in July 1805. As a sloop she served on convoy duty, though she also participated in the invasion of Martinique in early 1809. She was rebuilt as a bomb vessel in May 1812 and renamed Meteor. As Meteor she served in the Baltic and then off the United States, participating in attacks on up the Potomac and on Baltimore and New Orleans. She was sold in October 1816.

== Napoleonic Wars ==
She was commissioned in October 1805 under Commander John Simpson. On 3 January 1806 she recaptured the ships Argo and Adventure, and shared in the recapture of the Good Intent. Starr was off Villa de Conde, Portugal, when she intercepted the vessels, which had been taken from a convoy that Mercury had been escorting from Newfoundland to Portugal, and both of which had been carrying cargoes of fish. Starr sighted Good Intent and signaled Mercury, which recaptured her too. On 5 February, Curieux captured the Baltidore, which was the privateer that had captured Good Intent.

Starr escorted a convoy to Newfoundland in August 1807 and another to the Leeward Islands in 1808. While briefly under Commander Francis Augustus Collier, she participated in the capture of Martinique in February 1809 where she landed in command of a detachment of seamen and marines. In 1847 the Admiralty authorized the award of the Naval General Service Medal with clasp "Martinique" to all surviving claimants from the campaign.

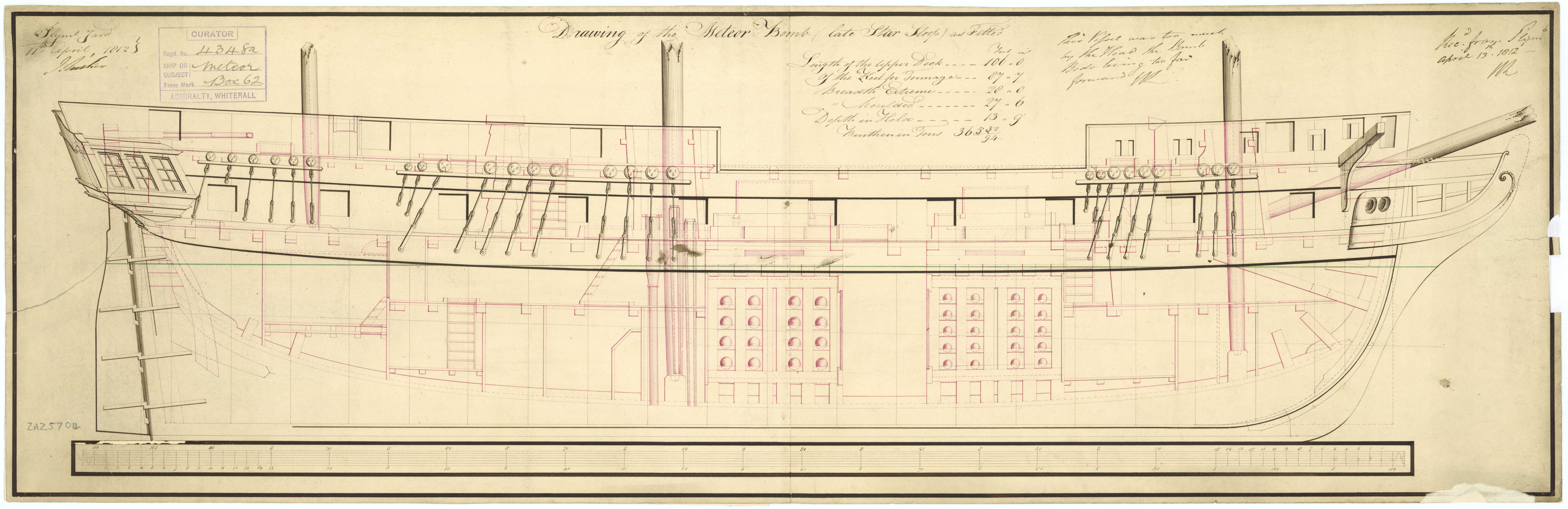
Meteor, plan of the 1812 rebuild

Between November 1811 and May 1812, Starr was rebuilt as a bomb vessel. She was then recommissioned, possibly in February 1812, as Meteor under Commander Peter Fisher. Her predecessor under the name Meteor, had been a bomb vessel too and had been sold in November.

Fisher sailed Meteor to the Baltic. There, she participated in operations against Zuid-Beveland, at the siege of Danzic, and at the blockade of the Scheldt. At Danzig, Meteor joined Swedish and Russian gunboats in an attack on the French garrison. Meteor pressed the attack, coming in close under the shore batteries and the bombardment damaged many houses, both directly and through subsequent fires. The allies succeeded in capturing a point, which would enable them to close the city to resupply by sea even without maintaining a naval blockade. One Russian gunboat was sunk and in all, the allies lost about 200 men. The Duke of Wurtemburg mentioned Fisher's intrepidity to Tsar Alexander.

== War of 1812 ==
On 12 August 1812, Mars and Meteor captured the American vessels Cuba, Caliban, Cygnet, Edward, Galen, and Halcyon. (Note: Prize money was payable in November 1815. A first-class share amounted to £360 2s 3d; a sixth-class share, the amount allotted to an ordinary seaman, was worth £3 11s 7d. For an ordinary seaman this would amount to some three months' wages.)

Meteor was part of a squadron that on 2 June 1814 sailed from the Garonne, carrying 2500 troops under the command of Major General Ross to attack the United States.

On 19 February 1814 Samuel Roberts took command of Meteor. He then sailed her from the Garonne to North America as an escort to a detachment of troops under Major-General Ross.

Meteor participated in the expedition up the Potomac (August–September 1814). On 17 August Euryalus, bombs Devastation, Aetna, and Meteor, the rocket ship Erebus, and the dispatch boat Anna-Maria were detached under Captain Gordon of Seahorse to sail up the Potomac River and bombard Fort Washington, about ten or twelve miles below the capital. The force withdrew between 1 and 5 September, having accomplished their mission and having captured numerous small American vessels. Meteor suffered two seamen severely wounded during the withdrawal operation. (Note: Prize money was awarded for the capture of Alexandria, Virginia, and the shipping there. A first-class share was worth £183 9s 1 3/4d; a sixth-class share, that of an ordinary seaman, was worth £1 19s 3 1/2d.)

On 12 September Erebus, Meteor, Aetna, Terror, Volcano, and Devastation sailed up the Patapsco River in preparation for an attack on Baltimore. Meteor participated in the bombardment of Fort Washington, Maryland, on the Potomac River in August 1814 and the bombardment on the 13th of Fort McHenry at Baltimore. Thus, "the bombs bursting in air" from The Star-Spangled Banner by Francis Scott Key were, at least in part, Meteor's. The squadron was ordered to withdraw on the 14th.

In winter 1814 Meteor also took part in the naval expedition in the prelude that led to the Battle of New Orleans. On 8 December 1814, two US gunboats fired on Sophie, Armide and the sixth-rate frigate Seahorse while they were passing the chain of small islands that runs parallel to the shore between Mobile and Lake Borgne.

Between 12 and 15 December 1814, Captain Lockyer of Sophie led a flotilla of some 42 boats, barges, launches - armed with a carronade apiece - and three unarmed gigs to attack the US gunboats. Lockyer drew his flotilla from the fleet that was massing against New Orleans, including the 74-gun Third Rate Tonnant, Armide, Seahorse, Manly, and Meteor.

Lockyer deployed the boats in three divisions, of which he led one. Captain Montresor of the gun-brig Manly commanded the second, and Captain Roberts of Meteor commanded the third. After rowing for 36 hours, the British met the Americans at St. Joseph's Island. On 13 December 1814, the British attacked the one-gun schooner USS Sea Horse. On the morning of the 14th, the British engaged the Americans in a short, violent battle.

The British captured the entire American force, including the tender USS Alligator, captured by Roberts, (Note: Lockyer's despatch to Cochrane dated 18 December 1814, reproduced in "No. 16991". The London Gazette. 9 March 1815. pp. 446–449. 'Observing also, as we approached the flotilla, an armed sloop endeavouring to join them, Captain Roberts, who volunteered to take her with part of his division, succeeded in cutting her off and capturing her without much opposition. About ten o'clock, having closed to within long gun-shot, I directed the boats to come to.') and five gunboats. The British lost 17 men killed and 77 wounded; Meteor had three men wounded, including one severely. Anaconda then evacuated the wounded. In 1821 the survivors of the flotilla shared in the distribution of head-money arising from the capture of the American gun-boats and sundry bales of cotton. In 1847 the Admiralty issued a clasp (or bar) marked "14 Dec. Boat Service 1814" to survivors of the boat service who claimed the clasp to the Naval General Service Medal. (Note: The 'Names of Ships for which Claims have been proved' are as follows: warships Tonnant, Norge, Royal Oak, Ramillies, Bedford, Armide, Cydnus, Trave, Seahorse, Sophie, and Meteor; troopships Gorgon, Diomede, Alceste, and Belle Poule.)

Thereafter two bomb vessels were dispatched up the Mississippi to attack Fort St. Philip, along with Thistle, Herald, and Pigmy, to create a diversion. Although Aetna and Meteor were mentioned, the latter vessel was HMS Volcano, as Meteor's captain was elsewhere, and played an active role in the Battle of New Orleans. When Lieutenant Colonel Thornton stormed (and subsequently captured) a redoubt on the right bank of the Mississippi, Roberts commanded three gun vessels that protected the troops' right flank. Earlier, Roberts had kept the boats together that ferried the troops across the river for the attack.

Next, Meteor and Aetna were at the siege of Fort Bowyer in February 1815, the final engagement on the Gulf Coast.

In the event of further conflict, Meteor was tasked with to transmit supplies of corn to the Creek allies at Apalachicola in March 1815.

== Fate ==
On 13 June 1815, Meteor arrived at Portsmouth, having departed New Providence in the Bahamas. That same day, Captain Samuel Roberts received a promotion to post-captain. That month command passed to Commander Daniel Roberts. On 16 October 1816 Meteor was sold at Deptford to Mr Mellish for £1,450.
