= HMS Devastation (1804) =

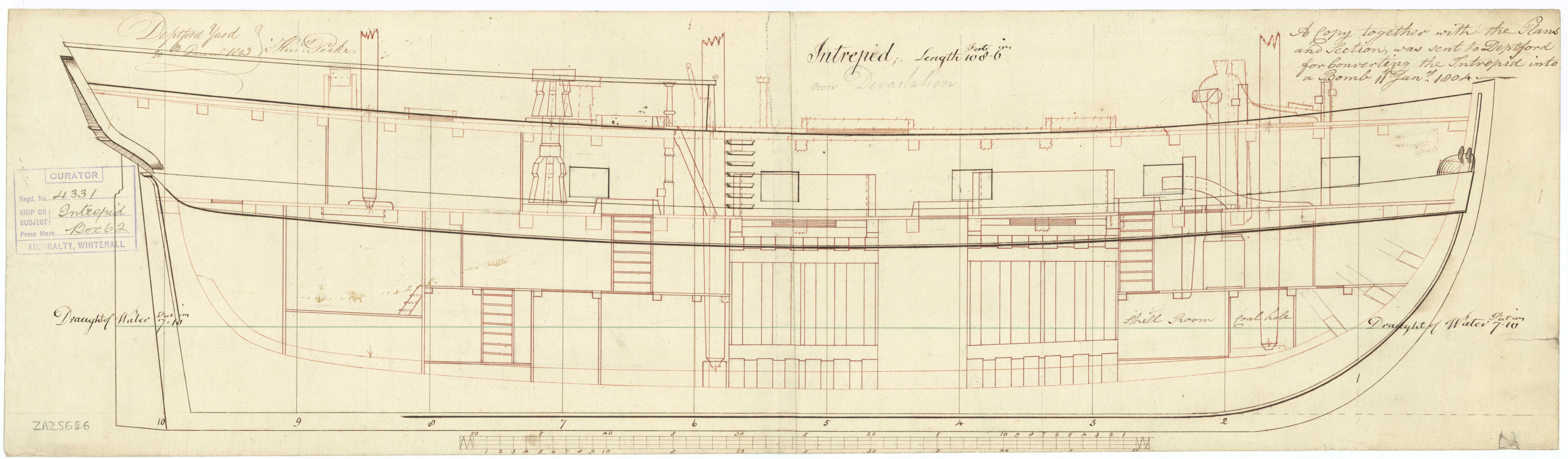
- Devastation

History

United Kingdom
- Name: Intrepid
- Builder: Simon Temple Jnr, South Shields (Temple shipbuilders)
- Launched: 1803
- Fate: Sold to Royal Navy in 1804

UK
- Name: HMS Devastation
- Acquired: By purchase, October 1804
- Fate: Sold 1816

General characteristics
- Type: Bomb vessel
- Tons burthen: 445, or 44565/94 (bm)
- Length: 104 ft 2 in (31.8 m) (overall); 84 ft 3 in (25.7 m) (keel)
- Beam: 31 ft 6 1/2 in (9.6 m)
- Armament: 1 × 13" + 1 × 10" mortars; 2 × 24-pounder carronades + 6 × 9-pounder guns

HMS Devastation was an 8-gun British Royal Navy bomb vessel launched in 1803 at South Shields as the mercantile Intrepid. The Navy purchased her in 1804. She served in the English Channel, the Baltic, off the coast of Spain, and in the United States during the Napoleonic Wars and War of 1812, most notably at the bombardment of Fort McHenry in the Battle of Baltimore in September 1814. The Navy sold her in 1816.

== Origins ==
Simon Temple Jnr, of South Shields, launched Intrepid in 1803. Although one highly reputable source gives her launch year as 1789, Intrepid did not appear in Lloyd's Register between 1790 and 1805. She did enter the Register of Shipping (RS) in 1804 with Longridge, master, S.Temple, owner, launch location Jarrow, launch year of 1803, and trade Newcastle–London. The Royal Navy purchased Intrepid in 1804.

== Naval career ==
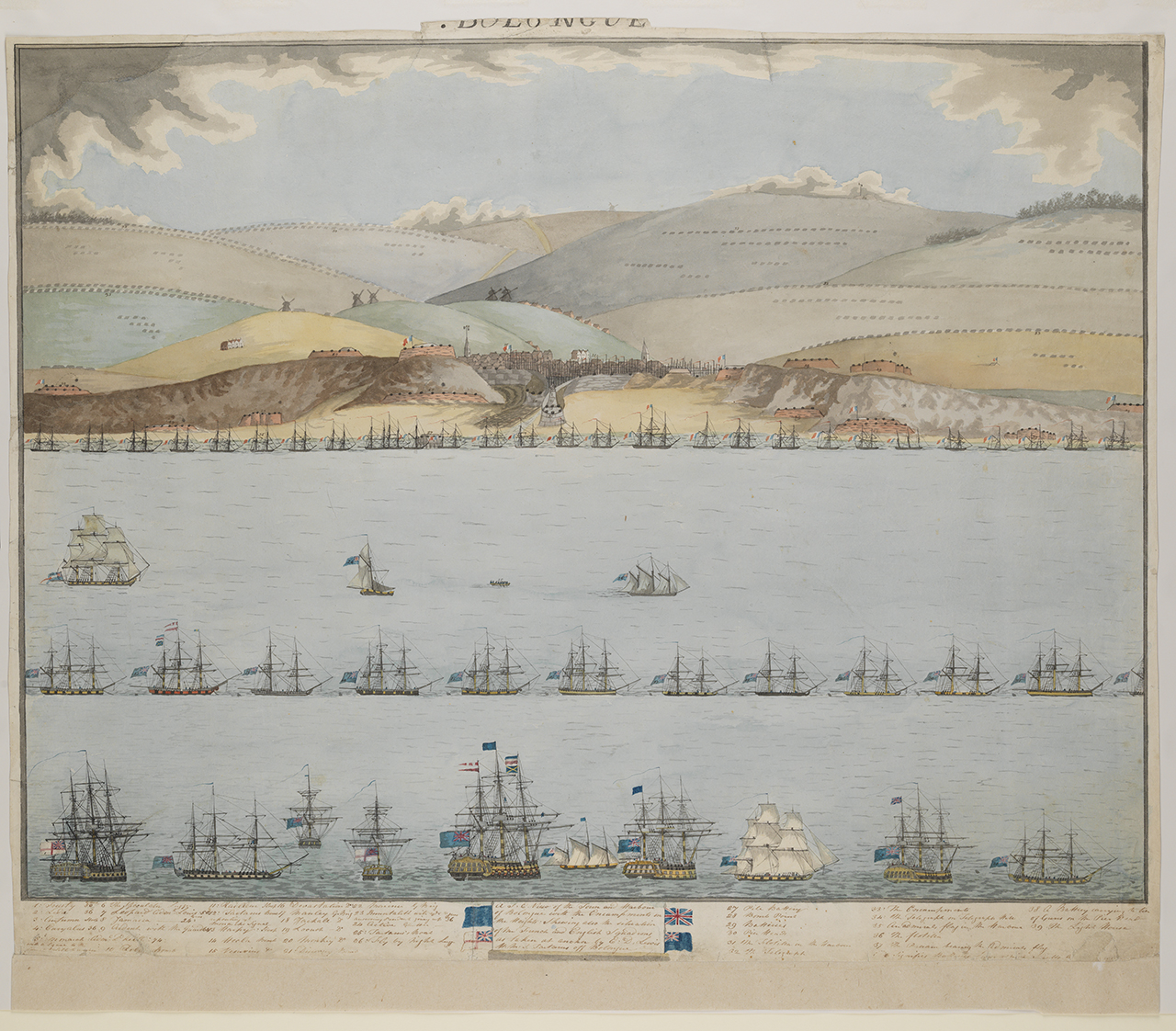
Devastation at the attack on Boulogne October 1804

Commander Alexander Milner commissioned Devastation in March 1804 for the North Sea.

As part of Britain's measures against Napoleon's planned invasion of the United Kingdom Devastation was part of a large squadron, comprising eleven ships, ten brigs, three bomb-vessels, an armed lugger, and a cutter, which on 24 and 25 April 1805, captured eight unarmed schuyts and an unarmed transport ship at Boulogne.

Between 1806 and 1807 Devastation was under the command of Commander Matthew Smith. Commander J.Smith recommissioned her in March 1808.

In 1808 Devastation was in the squadron under the command of Rear-Admiral Richard Keats operating in the Baltic Sea during the war with Denmark–Norway. When news of the uprising of the Spanish against the French reached Denmark, some 12,000 Spanish troops of the Division of the North stationed there under the command of the Marquis de la Romana decided that they wished to leave French service and return to Spain. The Marquis contacted Rear-Admiral Keats in his flagship Superb, and on 9 August 1808 the Spaniards seized the fort and town of Nyborg. Keats' squadron then took possession of the port and organized the transportation of the Spanish back to their home country.

Devastation, Commander John Taylor, took part in the Walcheren Campaign in July and August 1809. He sailed for Cadiz on 8 April 1810.

At the end of 1810 Cadiz was being besieged by the French, who had assembled a flotilla of gun-boats to attack the town. On 23 November Devastation, Thunder, and Aetna, with a number of English and Spanish mortar and gun-boats, attacked the French flotilla at El Puerto de Santa María, between them firing some hundred shells with considerable effect.

In February 1812 Commander Thomas Alexander assumed command of Devastation.

Shortly after the outbreak of the War of 1812, on 12 August, Devastation shared in the seizure of several American vessels: Cuba, Caliban, Edward, Galen, Halcyon, and Cygnet. (Note: Prize money was paid in November 1815. A first-class share was worth £360 2s 3d; a sixth-class share, that of an ordinary seaman, was worth £3 11s 7d.)

In 1813 Devastation served in the Baltic.

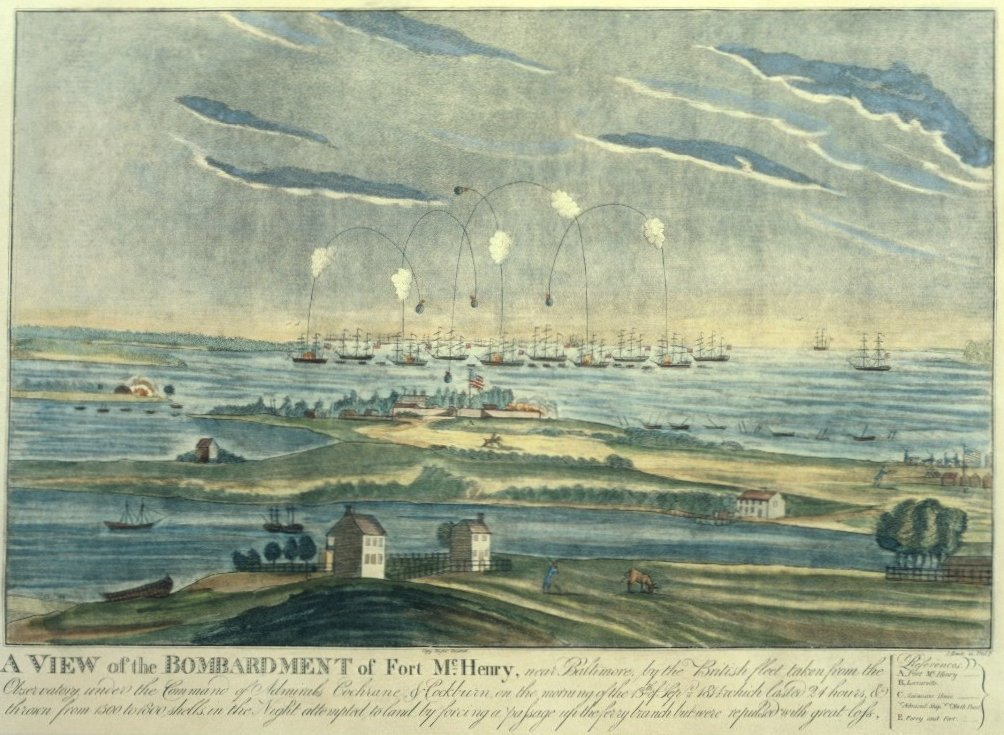
British bomb-vessels attack Fort McHenry, a contemporary print

During the War of 1812 Devastation, commanded by Thomas Alexander, was part of the squadron under the command of James Gordon that in August–September 1814 sailed up the Potomac River in the raid on Alexandria, seeing the destruction of Fort Warburton, and accepting the surrender of the town. There they captured twenty-two merchant vessels and vast quantities of plunder, including 16,000 barrels of flour, 1,000 hogsheads of tobacco, 150 bales of cotton and some $5,000 worth of wine, sugar and other items before withdrawing. In the subsequent Battle of Baltimore, Devastation was one of five bomb-vessels that shelled Fort McHenry for 25 hours on 13–14 September, though without result.

On the morning of 31 October 1814, Devastation arrived at Parker's Point, Virginia, on the Potomac River, and landed two hundred seamen and marines to procure cattle. An American force of about 114 cavalry and 1,000 infantry, with five field guns, attacked the British. Devastation's men repulsed the attack, capturing two prisoners and twenty horses, and afterwards re-embarked without loss.

Early the next year Devastation was operating off Cumberland Island, Georgia. On 14 January 1815, after the capture of Fort Peter, British troops accompanied by the Devastation and Terror ascended the river to St. Marys and occupied the town.

In March 1815 Commander Martin Guise assumed command of Devastation.

== Fate ==
On 11 May 1816 Devastation was one of a large number of war-surplus ships and vessels advertised for sale at Portsmouth. She sold on 30 May for £1,400.

== See also ==
- List of bomb vessels of the Royal Navy
