= HMS Aetna (1803) =

Royal Navy bomb vessel

- Ship's plans for Ætna (Aetna)

United Kingdom
- Name: Success
- Builder: Arundel, equally Littlehampton,
- Launched: 1803
- Fate: Sold 1803

United Kingdom
- Name: HMS Aetna
- Namesake: Mount Etna
- Acquired: by purchase, 1803
- Commissioned: December 1803
- Decommissioned: Late 1815
- Honours and awards: Naval General Service Medal with clasps; Basque Roads 1809; Boat Service 23 Nov. 1810; The Potomac 17 Augt. 1814
- Fate: Sold, 1816 and disposed in Woolwich

United Kingdom
- Name: Success
- Acquired: 1816 by purchase
- Fate: Wrecked 1823

General characteristics
- Type: Bomb vessel
- Tons burthen: 366, or 367, or 368 (bm)
- Length: Overall:102 ft 0 in (31.1 m); Keel:81 ft 0 in (24.7 m)
- Beam: 29 ft 2 1/2 in (8.9 m)
- Depth of hold: 12 ft 6 in (3.8 m)
- Propulsion: Sails
- Complement: 67
- Armament: 8 × 24-pounder carronades; 1 × 13 in (330 mm) mortar; 1 × 10 in (250 mm) mortar

HMS Aetna (or HMS Ætna) was the mercantile Success launched in 1803 at Littlehampton. The Admiralty purchased her in 1803 for conversion into a Royal Navy bomb vessel. Aetna participated in the second Battle of Copenhagen in 1807 and the Battle of the Basque Roads in 1809. Later, she participated in the attack on Fort McHenry in the Battle of Baltimore and the bombardment of Fort Washington, Maryland in 1814, during the War of 1812. The Navy sold her in 1816 and she returned to mercantile service under her original name. She sailed to Calcutta, to Rio de Janeiro, and more locally until she was wrecked in 1823.

== Mercantile origins ==
Aetna was launched as the merchant vessel Success, at Arundel, equally Littlehampton, at the mouth of the River Arun. She appeared in the Register of Shipping (RS) under that name in the volume for 1804 with W.Birch, master, J. Coney, owner, and trade London. The Admiralty purchased Success in 1803.

== Naval career ==
Aetna was commissioned in December 1803 under Commander George Cocks and first served in the Mediterranean. His replacement was Commander Richard Thomas.

In December 1805 she came under the command of Captain John Quillam and in February 1807 or so under Commander William Peake, still in the Mediterranean. She was recommissioned in June 1807 under Commander William Godfrey for the Baltic. There she took part in the siege and bombardment of Copenhagen between 15 August and 20 October 1807, resulting in the capture of Danish Fleet by Admiral Gambier.

Commander Paul Lawless assumed command of Aetna in August, though he may have already been in command before then. Cockburn in his dispatches after the campaign noted that "the constant and correct Fire from the Ætna, Captain Lawless, particularly drew my Attention." Commander John Bowker replaced Lawless and then sailed Aetna for Cadiz on 8 April 1810.

In November 1811 Commander Richard Kenah replaced Bowker. He sailed Aetna to the Baltic in 1813.

Aetna then sailed for North America. In April 1814 Aetna sailed to America to join the squadron of Vice-Admiral Sir Alexander Cochrane.

=== Potomac River expedition ===
On 17 August the frigate Euryalus, bombs Devastation, Aetna, and Meteor, the rocket ship Erebus, and the dispatch boat Anna-Maria were detached under Captain Gordon of Seahorse to sail up the Potomac River and bombard Fort Washington, about ten or twelve miles below the capital. Contrary winds meant they had to sweep for more than 50 miles over a period of five successive days, and lacking a pilot through Kettle-Bottoms, meant that it took ten days to reach the Fort.

In 1847 the Admiralty issued a clasp (or bar) marked "The Potomac 17 Augt. 1814" to survivors who claimed the clasp to the Naval General Service Medal.

=== Battle of Baltimore ===
On 12 September 1814 Erebus, Meteor, Aetna, Terror, Volcano, and Devastation sailed up the Patapsco River in preparation for an attack on Baltimore, commencing their bombardment of Fort McHenry on the 13th, before being ordered to withdraw on the 14th.

On 19 September 1814 the fleet, including Royal Oak, Asia, Ramillies, and Aetna, remained at anchor in the Patuxent River until 27th when it moved to the Potomac where shore operations were recommenced on 3 October, on which day Commander Kenah was killed. On 14 October the fleet departed for Negril Bay, Jamaica, arriving on 5 November, to prepare for the attack on New Orleans. Commander Francis Fead commanded Aetna in 1815, having assumed command on 4 October 1814.

=== Gulf Coast ===
At the end of 1814, Aetna took part in the Gulf Campaign. First, her crew were in sight of the Battle of Lake Borgne, and were eligible for prize money. (Note: 'Notice is hereby given to the officers and companies of His Majesty's ships Aetna, Alceste, Anaconda, Armide, Asia, Bedford, Belle Poule, Borer, Bucephalus, Calliope, Carron, Cydnus, Dictator, Diomede, Dover, Fox, Gorgon, Herald, Hydra, Meteor, Norge, Nymphe, Pigmy, Ramillies, Royal Oak, Seahorse, Shelburne, Sophie, Thames, Thistle, Tonnant, Trave, Volcano, and Weser, that they will be paid their respective proportions of prize money.') Next, Aetna and Volcanor were dispatched up the Mississippi, along with Thistle, Herald, and Pigmy, to create a diversion by the Fort St Philip. It took the British vessels from 30 December to 9 January 1815 to work the forty miles up the Mississippi to the fort, by warping and hard towing to the Plaquemines Bend, just below the fort. For most of January, Aetna was moored off the Mississippi; she moved to a new anchorage off Ship Island on 27 January 1815. On 9 February, Aetna was off Mobile Sound, and was ordered to send Lieutenant Knight and his Marine artillerymen to join the army on shore, who were preparing to besiege Fort Bowyer. The following day, the bomb vessels Meteor, and Hydra arrived. Aetna witnessed the capitulation of the fort and the raising of the Union Jack.

Aetna was to remain off Mobile until the end of March 1815. On 25 April, she embarked some refugee slaves for passage to the Caribbean. They had come from Negro Fort, which the British were evacuating. Once the former slaves had disembarked, Aetna embarked invalided servicemen whom she carried to Portsmouth. James Baynton Gardner, commander since 23 January 1815, arrived at Portsmouth on 19 July 1815.

=== Disposal ===
Returning from America, Aetna arrived back at Portsmouth on 19 July 1815, before sailing to Woolwich for disposal. The principal Officers and Commissioners of His Majesty's Navy offered the "Ætna bomb, of 368 tons", lying at Woolwich, for sale on 14 December. She sold there on 11 January 1816 for £1,850.

== Mercantile service ==
Success reappeared in Lloyd's Register in 1816 with Martin, master, Morgan & Co., owner, and trade London–Jamaica. She had undergone a thorough repair in 1816.

Year	Master	Owner	Trade	Source
1818	Martin	Morgan & Co.	London–Calcutta	LR; thorough repairs 1816
1820	Martin	Morgan & Co.	London–Gibraltar	LR; thorough repairs 1816

On 26 November 1817 Success was at Deal, having arrived from the Thames on her way to Calcutta. On 28 February 1818 Success arrived off the Cape of Good Hope from London; she was bound for Calcutta. She arrived back at Gravesend on 254 January 1819.

On 30 December 1818 as Success was returning from Bengal she was off Pico Island in the Azores when the insurgent privateer schooner Buenos Ayres, of 18 guns and 100 men (mostly Britons and Americans), boarded Success. In the dusk they suspected that she was Spanish because of her high stern. The privateer's men inspected her papers carefully to insure that she was not Spanish sailing under a false flag. The privateer's Chief Mate informed Captain Martin that the privateer had been out nine months and had a successful cruise, having captured numerous vessels, including a major Spanish vessel and a Portuguese vessel coming from Bengal with Spanish goods on board.

Year	Master	Owner	Trade	Source
1822	Martin	Morgan & Co.	London–Rio de Janeiro	LR; thorough repairs 1816, small repairs 1822
1824	T.Martin	Morgan & Co.	Cork–Gibraltar; London–Quebec	LR; small repairs 1822

== Fate ==
Lloyd's List published a letter from Les Sables-d'Olonne dated 16 August 1823, reporting that Success, Martin, had wrecked while sailing between Oberon (Oléron) to Abbeveille. The crew had been saved.
