= Edmund Palmer =

British Royal Navy officer

Captain Edmund Palmer CB
- Born: c. 1781
- Died: 19 September 1834; Brighton, Sussex
- Military career
- Allegiance: United Kingdom
- Branch: Royal Navy
- Service years: 1793–1834
- Conflicts: French Revolutionary Wars; Napoleonic Wars; Battle of Jobourg

Captain Edmund Palmer CB (c. 1781 – 19 September 1834) was a Royal Navy officer of the late eighteenth and early nineteenth century who is best known for his service as commander of the frigate HMS Hebrus, in the Battle of Jobourg off the Normandy Coast, in the last frigate ship-to-ship battle of the Napoleonic Wars on 27 March 1814. Chasing down the frigate Etoile, which was making for Saint Malo, Palmer cornered and defeated the French ship in a fierce engagement.

== Life ==
Palmer was born in c. 1781, the son of a Post Office official with political influence. He joined the Royal Navy in 1793 at the outbreak of the French Revolutionary Wars and served aboard HMS Gibraltar and then the frigate HMS Aigle under her destruction on the North African coast in 1798. He subsequently served in HMS Ville de Paris, HMS Princess Royal and HMS Pictou before being placed in reserve at the Peace of Amiens in 1801.

At the start of the Napoleonic Wars in 1803 he returned to service as a lieutenant in HMS Childers in the fleet of Earl St. Vincent. His connections enabled him to become acquainted with the Earl and in 1804 he was promoted to commander, captaining HMS Wizard in the Mediterranean for two years until promoted to post captain in 1807. Due to a dearth of available ships, Palmer subsequently spent seven years in reserve, where despite political and even royal influence in his favour he was unable to secure employment. Finally in January 1814, with the War of the Sixth Coalition coming to an end, he was appointed to the newly built frigate HMS Hebrus and joined the blockade of the French Channel ports.

It was while employed on this service that he encountered two French frigates off the Île de Batz on 26 March in company with the ship of the line HMS Hannibal. While Hannibal captured Sultane, Palmer was sent in pursuit of Etoile, cornering the French ship near the Normandy town of Jobourg. In a furious night action fought close inshore Palmer's ship was badly damaged, but he was able to repeatedly rake the French frigate, inflicting sufficient damage to force its surrender. The captured Etoile was taken to Plymouth and the war ended a week later. It was the last single-ship frigate action of the entire 23 year conflict.

The following year Palmer and Hebrus were active during the Hundred Days. After Napoleon's return to France, Palmer was ordered to convey French Royalist politicians to Bordeaux in an attempt to force the city to declare for King Louis XVIII. On arrival the city was found to be strongly held by Imperial supporters and it was only after the arrival of reinforcements that Palmer was confident enough to attempt to force his way into the city, attacking the defences on 13 July 1815. By 23 July the city had declared for the King, and Palmer was rewarded by being made a Companion of the Order of the Bath. In August 1816, Palmer and Hebrus were with the fleet which conducted the Bombardment of Algiers, but at the conclusion of the campaign it was discovered that the ship was rotten and Hebrus was paid off and broken up.

Palmer married Henrietta Jervis, a grandniece of Earl St. Vincent in November 1817 and the marriage, which produced eight children was noted for its happiness. His family situation led Palmer to turn down a coveted offer of a ship, HMS Liverpool in January 1818, and he entered semi-retirement in Brighton, refusing another offer of a ship in 1830 due to ill-health caused by a liver complaint and extensive financial commitments. he died in September 1834 from an illness of the liver at his home.
