= Battle of Jobourg =

1814 battle of the War of the Sixth Coalition

- Part of the War of the Sixth Coalition
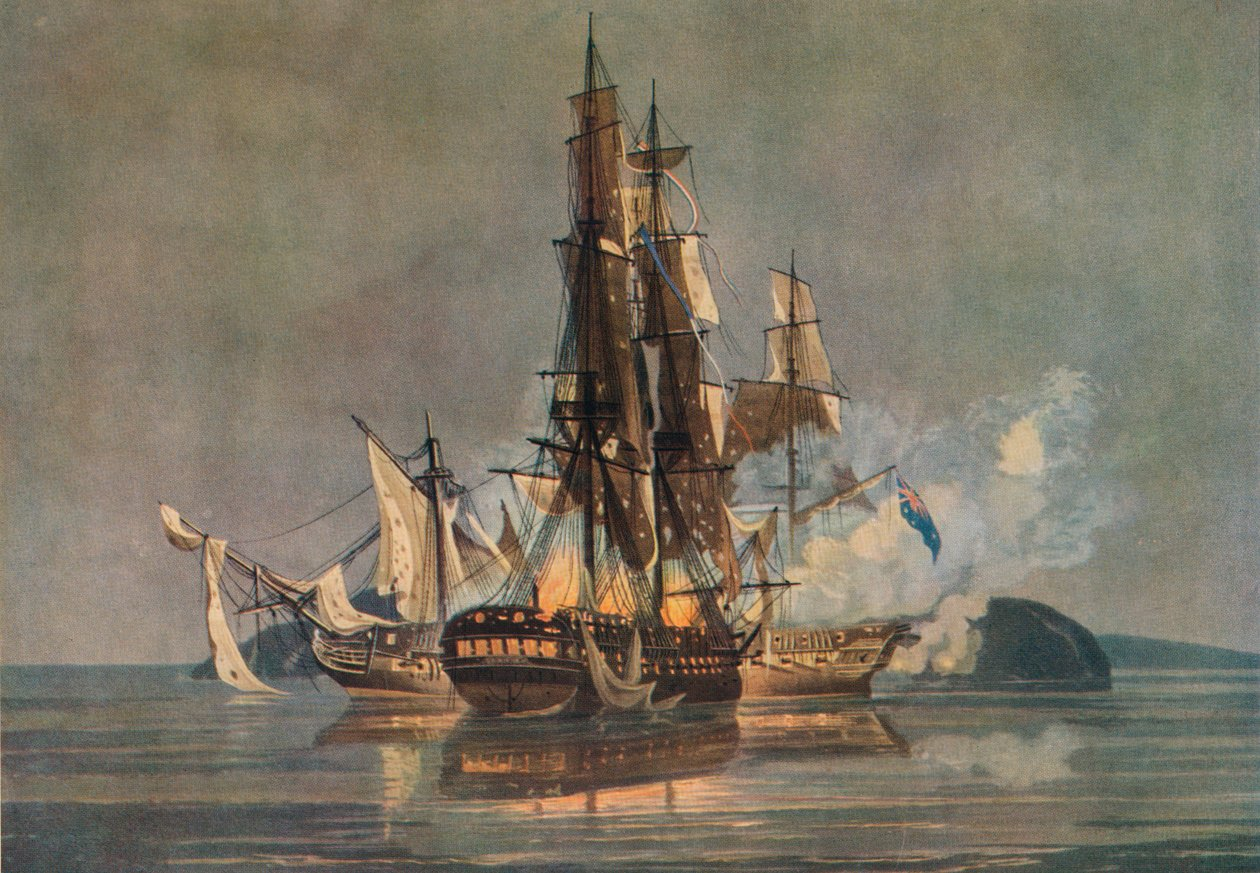
- Capture of the Étoile by the Hebrus off Cape La Hogue; Nicholas Pocock, c. 1815
Date	26–27 March 1814
Location	Off Jobourg, English Channel 49°42′N 01°58′W
Result	British victory

Belligerents
United Kingdom	France

Commanders and leaders
Sir Michael Seymour; Edmund Palmer	Pierre-Henri Philibert; Abel Aubert du Petit-Thouars

Strength
1 ship of the line 1 frigate 1 brig-sloop	2 frigates

Casualties and losses
14 killed 26 wounded	40 killed 73 wounded 2 frigates captured

The Battle of Jobourg was a minor naval engagement between the British and French navies during the last weeks of the War of the Sixth Coalition in the 22nd and penultimate year of the French Revolutionary and Napoleonic Wars. In October 1813 the French Navy, unable to challenge the Royal Navy's dominance at sea, sent two small squadrons of frigates to harass British trade in the Atlantic Ocean. One was brought to battle in January 1814 and defeated near the Canary Islands but the second, from Nantes and consisting of the frigates Etoile and Sultane, fought an inconclusive engagement against British frigate HMS Severn on 4 January in the mid-Atlantic and a furious battle against HMS Astrea and HMS Creole on 23 January near Maio in the Cape Verde Islands.

Attempting to return to Saint Malo in March, with the Allied armies at the gates of Paris and the war coming to a close, the French squadron was intercepted near the Île de Batz by a much stronger British squadron including the ship of the line HMS Hannibal, frigate HMS Hebrus and brig-sloop HMS Sparrow. Sultane, badly damaged in the engagement with Creole, was soon chased down by Hannibal and surrendered without a fight but Etoile, faced with only the Hebrus, turned away in an attempt to escape. Early in the morning of 27 March, Hebrus succeeded in reaching its quarry off Jobourg in Normandy and the frigates fought a fierce engagement close inshore. After more than two hours, Etoile's colours were struck and she surrendered. Casualties were heavy on both ships, but both prizes were successfully returned to Britain and commissioned into the Royal Navy. This was the final naval engagement of the War of the Sixth Coalition, which came to an end with Emperor Napoleon's abdication on 11 April.

== Background ==
By the end of October 1813 the War of the Sixth Coalition was in its final stages; Emperor Napoleon had been defeated at the Battle of Leipzig by the Allied European armies and was retreating to the borders of France, while the British army under the Lord Wellington had crossed the Pyrenees and was advancing on Toulouse. The French Navy had never recovered from defeat at the Battle of Trafalgar in 1805 and had made no serious effort to put to sea since the abortive attempt which ended in defeat at the Battle of Basque Roads in 1809. British control of the Atlantic Ocean trade routes was at this stage only contested by the small United States Navy and the handful of French raiders capable of evading the Royal Navy's constant close blockade of French ports, which had operated effectively and almost continuously since the outbreak of the French Revolutionary Wars in 1793.

In late October, small raiding squadrons, each consisting of two newly built frigates with picked crews and commanders departed France with instructions to attack British merchant shipping in the Atlantic. The first squadron was dispatched from Cherbourg and consisted of the 40-gun ships Iphigénie and Alcmène. The second sailed from Nantes and comprised the Etoile under Captain Pierre-Henri Philibert and Sultane under Captain Georges Du-Petit-Thouars. While Iphigénie and Alcmène targeted British trade with West Africa, Etoile and Sultane were directed to the centre Atlantic. Iphigénie and Alcmène captured several valuable British merchant ships before being intercepted and defeated on 16 January 1814 near the Canary Islands.

On 18 January 1814 Etoile and Sultane encountered a British merchant convoy at 24°N 53°W in the Central North Atlantic. Sighting distant sails at 04:00, the French captains soon confirmed that the convoy, sailing northwest towards its destination of Bermuda, was defended by only one British warship, the 40-gun frigate HMS Severn under Captain James Nourse. At 07:30, Nourse approached the unidentified ships, determining at 08:40 that they were enemy vessels and giving orders for the convoy to scatter. The French squadron pursued Severn, Nourse opening long-range fire with his stern mounted guns at Etoile at 10:30. The French ship held off returning fire with its bow guns until 16:05 when the range had narrowed considerably, Severn's flight distracting the French sufficiently to allow the convoy to escape. Severn proved to be a fast ship, Nourse successfully holding off pursuit through an exchange of fire at a distance of more than 2 nautical miles (3.7 km). At 17:30 French fire stopped as the range lengthened once more, and Severn began to pull away, Philibert finally calling off pursuit at 08:00 on 19 January.

== Battle of Maio ==
Battle of Maio
- Part of the Napoleonic Wars
Date	23 January 1814
Location	Porto Inglês, Maio, Cape Verde Islands; 15°05′N 23°12′W
Result	Inconclusive

Belligerents
United Kingdom	(France) French Empire

Commanders and leaders
George Charles Mackenzie; John Eveleigh †	Pierre-Henri Philibert; Georges Du-Petit-Thouars

Strength
2 frigates	2 frigates

Casualties and losses
19 killed, 63 wounded	20–40 killed, 30–60 wounded

The French squadron then sailed southwest, arriving at Maio in the Portuguese Cape Verde Islands on 22 January. The squadron anchored at Porto Inglês, and was discovered there at 09:55 the following morning by a British frigate squadron of the 36-gun ships HMS Astrea under Captain George Charles Mackenzie and HMS Creole under Captain John Eveleigh. The British ships were en route to Porto Inglês from Fuerteventura and first spied the French ships, with two small prizes, at anchor from across a promontory, assuming them to be Spanish or Portuguese ships. When the French failed to respond to the coded signals however the British captains realised that the strangers must be enemy vessels and resolved to attack them where they were anchored.

At 12:00 the French ships sailed for the open sea southeast along the coast of Maio, pursued by the British. Astrea suffered in the high winds, losing several topsails which impeded her speed. With Creole in the lead, the British ships succeeded in cutting ahead of the French by 12:45, Eveleigh firing his bow guns ahead of the French and exchanging broadsides with Sultane at 13:00. As Creole and Sultane engaged one another, Mackenzie took his repaired ship through the gap between them, exchanging two broadsides at close range with Sultane and advancing on Etoile which had pulled ahead of the combat. Astraea's intervention was timely, allowing Eveleigh to extinguish a small fire which had broken out in his rigging before Creole rejoined the combat at 14:30. Another fire broke out almost immediately, and although it was extinguished Astraea was badly damaged by fire from Sultane. Deciding that his ship could no longer effectively compete against the French warship, Mackenzie withdrew from combat, retreating towards the island of Santiago.

Astrea reached Etoile at 14:30, exchanging broadsides before raking the starboard bow of Philibert's ship. In the course of the manoeuvre, Astrea's helmsman lost control of the ship, and Philibert seized the opportunity to steer Etoile across the stern of Astrea. Pouring raking fire into the British ship from point blank range, Philibert inflicted severe damage to Astrea's quarterdeck, tearing away fittings and detonating a loaded carronade. Eveleigh desperately pulled his ship back alongside Etoile, but in doing so was struck in the chest and killed by pistol fire from the deck of Etoile. Lieutenant John Bulford assumed command, continuing to fight Philibert at close range. By 15:05 however it was clear that there was no prospect of victory: Creole could be seen retreating from the battle while Sultane was rapidly approaching the combat, threatening to overwhelm the stricken frigate even as a fire broke out on the main topsail. The fire was soon extinguished, and Bulford contemplated an attempt to board Etoile but was thwarted by rough seas. At 15:30 Sultane raked Astrea before pulling away, Du Petit-Thouars considering that Philibert needed no assistance against the damaged British frigate.

At 16:15 the mizzenmast of Astrea, on fire once more, crashed over the side, leaving Bulford's ship unmaneuverable. Apparently content with reducing the British ship to a crippled state, Philibert withdrew Etoile to the southwest, joining Sultane, which was struggling with a collapsed main topmast. Thus reprieved, Bulford followed Creole towards Santiago, both British ships arriving soon afterwards in the port of Praia. British losses were heavy, Creole losing ten killed and 26 wounded while Astrea lost nine killed, including Captain Eveleigh, and 37 wounded. Both ships were badly damaged and Astrea was subsequently considered to have been lucky not to have been captured: William James wrote that Astrea was "in a state not less of surprise than of joy at her extraordinary escape".

== Battle of Jobourg ==
Etoile and Sultane, although the ostensible victors in the engagement, were both badly damaged themselves, with all masts suffering severely from the British bombardment and combined casualties of between 20–40 killed and 30–60 wounded. The damage to the masts was serious, as the frigates were thousands of miles from a friendly port and unable to effect any but the most basic repairs. Sultane in particular needed substantial temporary repairs and was forced to erect jury masts as the damage was too severe for regular service. Unable to continue their cruise, the frigates turned north towards Europe. By 26 March the squadron was sailing eastwards in the English Channel, approximately 35 nautical miles (65 km) north of the Île de Batz in Brittany en route to the Normandy port of Saint Malo. At 09:00 two vessels were sighted close by, their approach masked by heavy fog. These were the British 36-gun frigate HMS Hebrus under Captain Edmund Palmer and the 16-gun brig-sloop HMS Sparrow under Commander Francis Erskine Loch, participating in the blockade of the French Channel ports.

Sparrow had been sighted so close to the French ships that it came under immediate fire, which tore up the rigging, killed a petty officer and wounded another sailor. Sparrow closed with Hebrus for support, Palmer firing long-distance broadsides at the French while signalling for support from the nearby 74-gun ship of the line HMS Hannibal under Captain Sir Michael Seymour. As the fog cleared, Hannibal could be clearly seen advancing under all sail from the northwest. As a shift in the wind to the northwest at 11:00 offered the French an opportunity of escape, the frigates separated, the damaged Sultane following the wind and Etoile turning to the southeast. Recognising that only Hebrus was in a position to catch Etoile, Seymour ordered Palmer to pursue while Hannibal and Sparrow advanced on Sultane. Du Petit-Thouars' ship was in no position to evade or resist the much larger British warship and was within range of Hannibal by 15:30, Seymour firing two warning shots over Sultane. Recognising his inevitable defeat, Du Petit-Thouars fired a broadside into the sea away from Hannibal and struck his flag in a gesture of surrender at 16:15, Seymour taking possession of the French ship.

While his companion was overrun by Hannibal, Philibert was making strenuous efforts to escape from Hebrus. By 14:00 the Sultane and Hannibal were out of sight, Sparrow disappearing over the horizon three hours later with Etoile 3 nautical miles (5.6 km) ahead of Palmer's pursuit. Philibert turned northeast in a further effort to get away, but Hebrus was still slowly gaining on Etoile was night fell. As the ships passed through Alderney Race, Palmer gained considerable water on Philibert, driving the French ship close inshore near the village of Jobourg at 01:35 on 27 March. Faced with the risk of grounding in the dark, Philibert turned and opened fire on Hebrus at 01:45, the frigates exchanging fire as Etoile slowly wore around Jobourg Point. Palmer attempted to rake Etoile, passing so close astern that their rigging almost entangled, but Philibert responded by crossing the bows of Hebrus, inflicting severe damage to the British ship's rigging at 02:20. Maneuvering away from land, Palmer was assisted by a light breeze at 03:00, passing repeatedly across Etoile's bow and raking the ship each time, causing serious damage so that by 03:45 Philibert's mizzenmast had collapsed over the side. Fifteen minutes later Etoile finally ceased fire, with Philibert hailing to announce his surrender.

== Aftermath ==
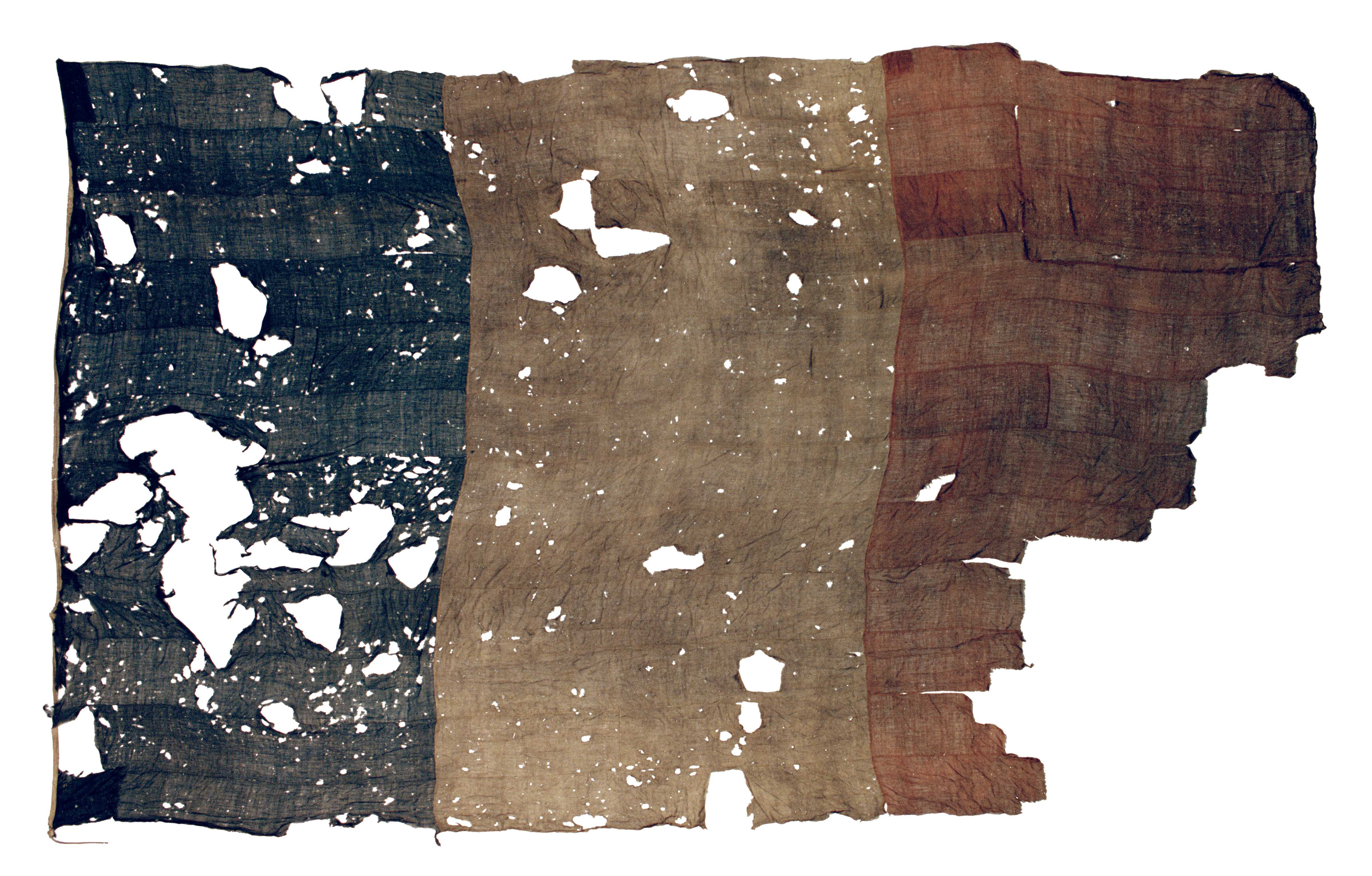
The French ensign from 'L'Etoile'. This was the last naval ensign to be captured from the French during the Napoleonic Wars and was presented to Greenwich Hospital in 1866 by Captain Palmer's widow.

Palmer's first task was to pull both ships away from the immediate shoreline; in addition to the risk of grounding, a French gun battery had opened fire at random in the dark, shot striking both British and French ships. By 07:00 both Hebrus and Etoile had been successfully extracted around Jobourg point, coming to anchor near the coastal village of Vauville. Hebrus had considerable damage to her rigging and 13 dead and 25 wounded from a crew of 284. Etoile's main damage was in the hull, with losses of 40 killed and 73 wounded from a crew of 327. The damage to Etoile was so severe that Palmer immediately ordered the ship to make for Plymouth, arriving on 29 March. Sultane was in a better state, reaching Portsmouth sometime earlier. Both frigates were newly built and in good condition, both being commissioned into the Royal Navy, Etoile as HMS Topaze and Sultane under her own name. In his report on the action, Seymour wrote of Palmer that " I am quite at a loss how to express, in adequate terms, my admiration of Captain Palmer's skill and decision on so interesting an occasion, and his new ship's company, his officers and his own able and intrepid conduct." More than three decades later the battle was among the actions recognised by a clasp attached to the Naval General Service Medal, awarded upon application to all British participants still living in 1847.

The battle was the last significant naval action of the War of the Sixth Coalition, the Allied armies entering Paris on 30 March and Napoleon, isolated and defeated, abdicating on 6 April. Combat in the Atlantic would continue with the War of 1812, and there was one final naval engagement of the long Napoleonic Wars during the Hundred Days in 1815, when the ship of the line HMS Rivoli intercepted and defeated the Napoleonic frigate Melpomène on 30 April. Hebrus's battle with Etoile was however the final encounter of dozens between individual frigates in the almost continuous 23-years of warfare between Britain and France.
