= Frederick Whitworth Aylmer, 6th Baron Aylmer =

Roual Navy Admiral (1777–1858)

Admiral The Right Honourable The Lord Aylmer KCB
- Born: Frederick Whitworth William Aylmer; 12 October 1777; Twyford, Hampshire, England
- Died: 5 March 1858 (aged 80) Westbourne Grove, London, England
- Buried: Kensal Green Cemetery, London, England
- Allegiance: United Kingdom
- Branch: Royal Navy
- Service years: 1790–1858
- Rank: Admiral
- Awards: Turkish Gold Medal; Order of Saint Ferdinand and of Merit; Knight Commander, Order of the Bath

Admiral Frederick Whitworth Aylmer, 6th Baron Aylmer (12 October 1777 – 5 March 1858) was a British Royal Navy officer who fought in the French Revolutionary Wars and the Napoleonic Wars, eventually rising to the rank of admiral. He was born on 12 October 1777 in Twyford, Hampshire, into a naval family which included his great-great-grandfather, Admiral Matthew Aylmer.

Aylmer went to sea at thirteen years of age, and in 1798, as a lieutenant, served aboard HMS Swiftsure at the Battle of the Nile. In 1805, he made post and in 1809 was appointed to a frigate in the channel, where he took part in raids on the north coast of Spain.

Aylmer is primarily known as the commander of the force that penetrated the Gironde in July 1815, as part of a wider British strategy to rally French royalists against Napoleon. In 1816, commanding the heavy frigate HMS Severn, Aylmer took part in the Bombardment of Algiers, and was subsequently awarded the Companion of the Order of the Bath, the royal order of St Ferdinand and of Merit and the royal military order of St Fernando.

== Personal life ==
Born in Twyford, near Winchester in Hampshire on 12 October 1777, Fredrick Whitworth Aylmer was the great-great-grandson of Admiral Matthew Aylmer, the grandson of Captain Henry Aylmer and cousin to Admiral John Aylmer. Fredrick's father was Sir Henry Aylmer, 4th Lord Aylmer and his mother was Catharine Whitworth.

== Career ==
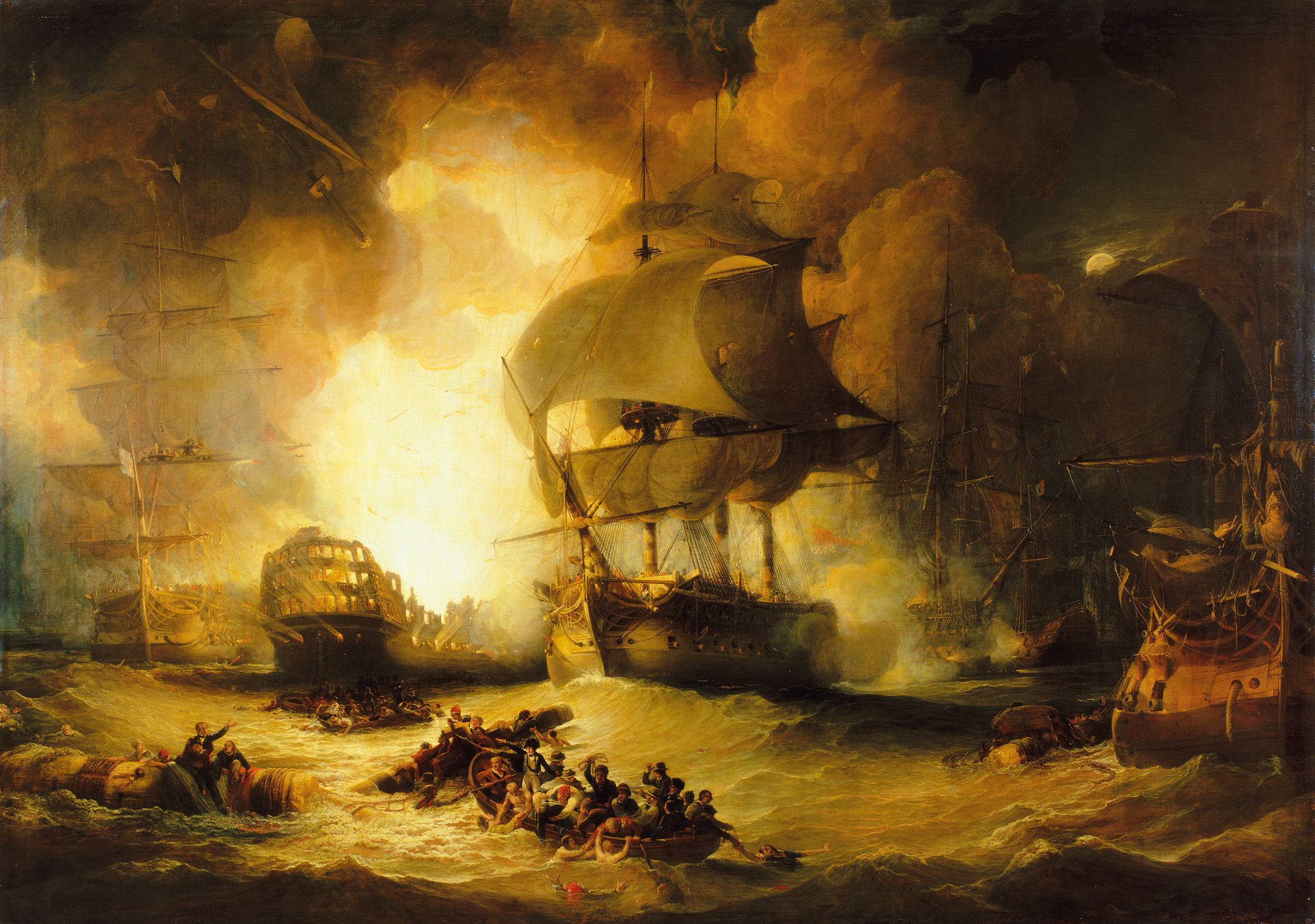
HMS Swiftsure (centre of the picture) at the Battle of the Nile, as the French ship, Orient explodes.

Aylmer joined the navy shortly after his thirteenth birthday, as a captain's servant to John Manley, on board the 32-gun frigate, HMS Syren, in the Channel. Aylmer was rated as a midshipman in September 1791 before following his captain to the newly built, 38-gun, HMS Apollo on the Irish station in 1794. Promoted to lieutenant in December 1796, Aylmer transferred to HMS Swiftsure the following January, and sailed to the Mediterranean under Captain Benjamin Hallowell Carew, where he participated in the Battle of the Nile. It was Swiftsure, in the company of HMS Alexander, that first discovered the French fleet in Aboukir Bay on 1 August 1798. Later, during the battle, Swiftsure anchored between Orient and Franklin, and fired into both until Orient caught alight and exploded.

In January 1802, following a protracted period of shore leave, Aylmer returned to the Mediterranean, joining Lord Keith's squadron as commander of the 18-gun sloop Delight. In 1803, he returned to home waters, serving in the Channel and off Cádiz under Sir John Orde, in another 18-gun sloop, Wasp.

Aylmer made Post on 18 May 1805 but was not given a command until 1809 when he was appointed to the 32-gun frigate Narcissus and employed in the Channel under Lord Gambier. In January–February 1810 Narcissus recaptured two merchant vessels, and captured two French privateers, Duguay Trouin and Aimable Joséphine.

Aylmer had an important role in a combined operation against Santoña the following July. In an attempt to draw French troops from the country's interior; 500 Spanish soldiers and a battalion of British seamen and marines from Narcissus, HMS Amazon and HMS Arethusa, landed on the beach west of town, which they then took without loss. The allies held the town for three days against a force of 700 to 800 French troops before retiring on 8 July, after putting around 150 of the enemy out of action, and destroying the guns of the forts at Santoña and Laredo.

=== North America ===
In September 1813, Aylmer was appointed to the newly constructed HMS Pactolus, and in August 1814 was part of a small squadron under Sir Thomas Masterman Hardy comprising Ramillies, Dispatch, Terror and herself, which took part in the bombardment of Stonington, Connecticut. On 9 August, after the town was shown to be manufacturing arms and assisting in the destruction of British ships off the coast of New London, the brig, Dispatch anchored close to a shore battery and opened fire. The water was too shallow for the other ships to lend their support, and the brig was recalled after two men were killed and twelve more injured. On 11 August, Ramillies and Pactolus came inshore as close as the depth of water would allow and discharged their guns. The town was forced to evacuate, and after inflicting much damage the British squadron sailed off.

=== The Gironde ===
In July 1815, Aylmer commanded a small force which sailed up the Gironde and entered Bordeaux, which although garrisoned by Imperial troops was largely sympathetic to the Royalist cause. Aylmer's ship, Pactolus, arrived at the mouth of the estuary on 3 July and immediately an Aide-de-Camp was despatched under a flag of truce, to open a dialogue with General Bertrand Clausel, who was commanding the armies in the area. Shortly after, the 36-gun Hebrus, under Captain Edmund Palmer, arrived with arms and supplies for the Royalists and when it became apparent that Clausel was not going to negotiate, Palmer and Aylmer decided to try and open a line of communication with the Royalist supporters directly. The initial plan was to enter the river on 11 July 1815 but the attempt was postponed when five vessels were spotted making out to sea and the British were obliged to pursue them. Later that night, after discovering that the ships had sailed in response to the recent lifting of an embargo, the British re-assembled to await favourable winds and tide. On 13 July, the small squadron comprising Pactolus and Hebrus, each with a transport in tow, together with Falmouth, entered the mouth of the estuary and soon after doing so were met by a delegate from Royan who gave an undertaking that the town's guns would not fire upon them, providing the courtesy was reciprocated. Although the fort at Verdon did open fire, the British did not retaliate and after anchoring, a delegation, headed by the Comte de Lasteur, was sent to once again try and establish contact with Clausel while Falmouth was sent home with dispatches for Lord Keith.

Aylmer thought it prudent to destroy all enemy forts and guns within range of the river in order to secure a line of retreat, and so set about putting the batteries of Royan out of action. This was not popular with the town's residents but they were pacified by the two French nobles, the Compte de la Tour and Baron de Montalembert, who were aiding the British with their mission. During the night, the Republican troops abandoned the fort at Verdon enabling the British to dismantle it the following day. On the 16th, the British sailed further up the river towards Castillon having destroyed the forts of Verdon, Royan de Lousac and Miche, and 70 other pieces of artillery along the mouth of the estuary. When the British arrived at Castillon, Aylmer received a communication from Clausel notifying him of an armistice. Palmer, who had sailed directly to Bordeaux in Hebrus, arrived on 22 July to find the city under the Bourbon flag.

=== Algiers ===
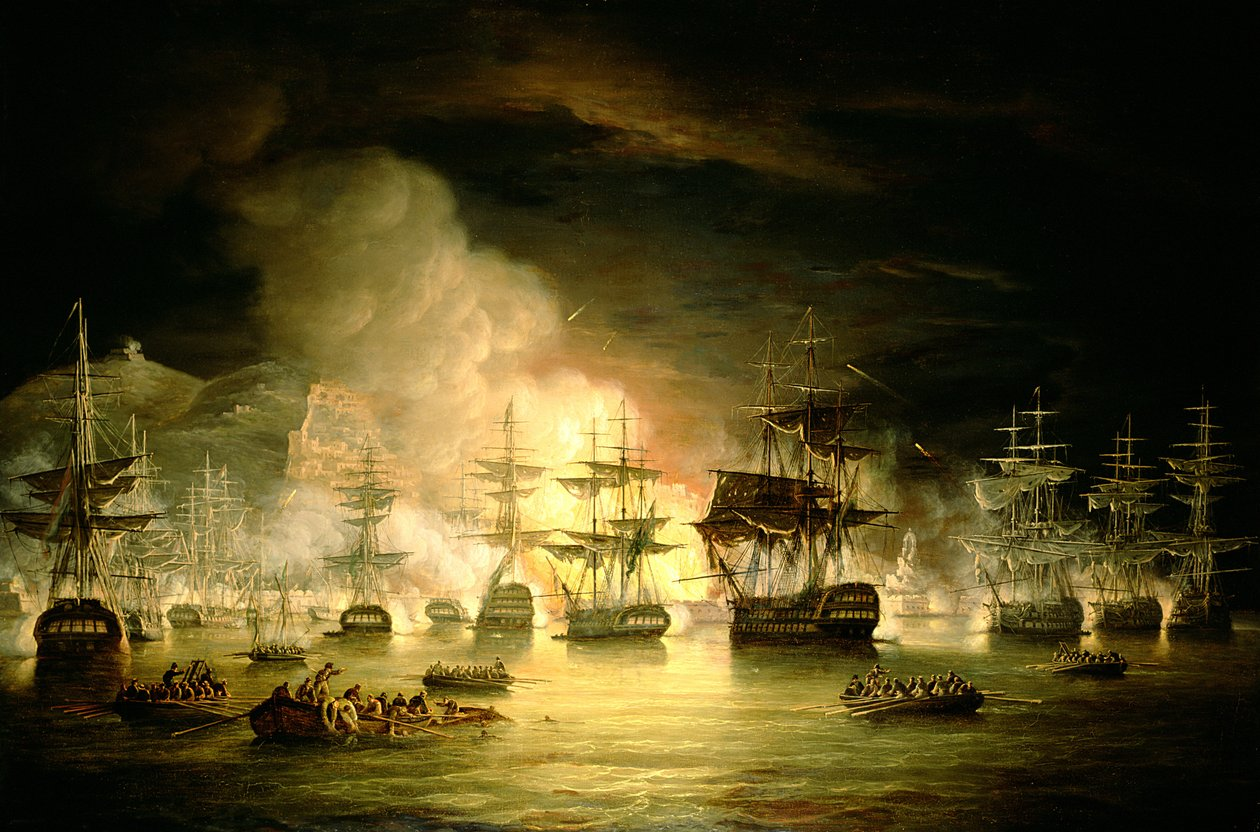
Bombardment of Algiers, painting by Thomas Luny

In February 1816, Aylmer was given command of the 38-gun, Endymion-class frigate, HMS Severn and on 27 August took part in the attack on Algiers by an Anglo-Dutch force. A British fleet under Edward Pellew, comprising six line-of-battle ships, four frigates, nine smaller warships, a naval transport, a sloop and a despatch-vessel, left Plymouth at 12.00 on 28 July. On 9 August they arrived off Gibraltar where they joined a Dutch squadron of five frigates and a corvette. The combined fleet was kept in the bay by bad weather until 13 August when Commander James Murray arrived in the 18-gun HMS Satelitte and the fleet was given a detailed plan of action and information regarding the city's defences. The city was shown to be heavily defended with more than 1,000 guns. The harbour wall alone was mounting more than 220 guns, the vast majority being between 18 and 32-pounders. The harbour entrance was guarded by another three batteries to the southwest, the largest being the Fish Market battery of 15 guns in three tiers, and it was this battery that Aylmer in Severn was charged with destroying. Spreading south, along the coast, were a number of other batteries and, on the opposite side of the bay, facing the harbour entrance, a fort. These coastal defences mounted a further 60 to 70 guns. Inland, on the areas of higher ground stood various other batteries and a further fort. The northern side of the city was not so well defended with fewer than a hundred cannon but the depth of water on this side made an approach impossible. The harbour itself contained four heavy frigates, five large corvettes and between 30 and 40 smaller armed vessels, and 40,000 extra men had been brought in to protect the city.

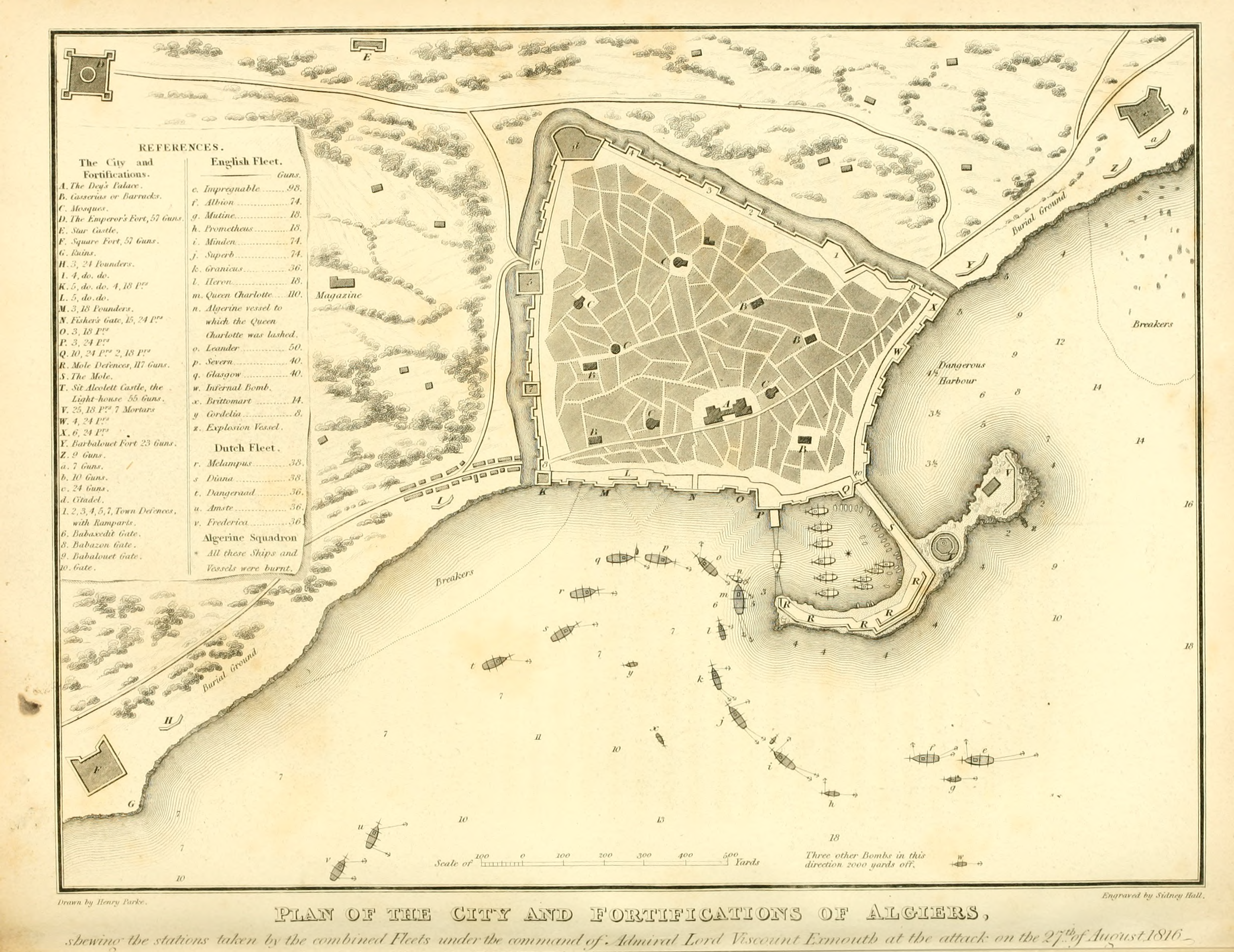
Plan showing the fortifications of Algiers and the position of the Anglo-Dutch fleet during the bombardment

Late morning, the following day, the wind was favourable and the Anglo-Dutch force, minus the 10-gun Jasper which was sent off with despatches, set sail for the port of Algiers. In the evening of 16 August 200 miles from its destination, the fleet encountered HMS Prometheus, whose captain, William Dashwood, was able to confirm that Pellew's intelligence was accurate. Having been forced to tack against contrary winds for much of the remaining journey, the fleet did not come within sight of the city until dawn on 27 August. Aylmer's ship, Severn was selected to tow a boat closer in, from where a delegate with a list of demands would then be rowed ashore. The demands included the abolition of Christian slavery, the release of all Christian slaves and the repayment of the money recently taken to secure the liberty of Neopolitan and Sardinian slaves.

Having been promised a reply within two hours, and having still not received one by 14:00, the British delegate, Lieutenant Burgess, returned to Severn and Pellew then gave the order for the fleet to take up position. Pellew's ship, Queen Charlotte, anchored at the head of the mole and almost immediately came under fire. The remaining four British battleships, Superb, Minden, Albion and Impregnable engaged the guns on the harbour wall while the three frigates, Glasgow, Severn and Leander attacked the shore batteries, with Severn concentrating her fire on the largest at the fish market. The smaller vessels were expected to take up position where convenient, except the bomb ketches which targeted the harbour and town from some 2,000 yards out. The Dutch squadron was sent against the batteries to the south of the city. By 19:00, HMS Leander had been so badly shot up, she was unable to keep station and only by running a cable to Severn, could she bring her guns to bear. The bombardment continued until 22:00 when Pellew ordered a withdrawal which, owing to the light winds and damage incurred by much of the fleet, took almost four hours to complete. By this time, most of the Algerian guns had been silenced, parts of the city were in flame and much of the shipping in the harbour was destroyed. Aylmer's crew suffered three dead and 34 wounded in the action. Total British losses were 128 killed and 690 wounded. The Dutch had 13 killed and 52 wounded. Accounts of the Algerian losses vary between 4,000 and 7,000 dead and wounded.

At dawn, Burgess was sent back to repeat the demands. He was met by an Algerian frigate captain who claimed that an answer had been sent the previous day but no one was found to receive it, and that the dey was ready to agree terms. On the afternoon of 29 August the first of several meetings took place which culminated in the dey agreeing to the release of 1200 Christian slaves into British custody, an undertaking to abolish the practice of slavery, the repayment of 382,500 dollars to Naples and Sicily, peace with the king of the Netherlands, compensation amounting to 30,000 dollars for the destruction of the British consul's property, together with a public apology for detaining him.

For his services, Aylmer was made a Companion of the Order of the Bath. He was also awarded the royal order of St Ferdinand and of Merit for transporting freed Italian slaves to Naples together with the sum of money repaid by the Algerians. Spain also honoured him as a knight of the royal military order of St Fernando.

=== Later career ===
Between 1830 and 1837, Aylmer served as aide-de-camp to William IV. He was made a rear-admiral on 10 January 1837, a vice-admiral in reserve on 8 January 1848 and in full on 1 July 1851. He received a good service pension from 1 July 1851 and a Knight Commander of the Order of the Bath, on 5 July 1855. Aylmer reached the rank of admiral on 11 September 1854 and died at his home, 20 Dawson Place, Westbourne Grove, on 5 March 1858.

== Bibliography ==
- James, William (2002) [1827]. The Naval History of Great Britain, Volume II, 1797–1799. London: Conway Maritime Press. ISBN 0-85177-906-9.
- James, William (2002) [1827]. The Naval History of Great Britain, Volume VI, 1811–1827. London: Conway Maritime Press. ISBN 0-85177-910-7.
- Winfield, Rif (2008). British Warships in the Age of Sail 1793–1817: Design, Construction, Careers and Fates. London: Seaforth. ISBN 978-1-86176-246-7.
- Tracy, Nicholas (2006). Who's Who in Nelson's Navy. London: Chatham Publishing. ISBN 1-86176-244-5.

Peerage of Ireland
Preceded by Matthew Whitworth-Aylmer	Baron Aylmer; 1850–1858	Succeeded by Udolphus Aylmer
