= Égyptienne (ship) =

During the French Revolutionary and Napoleonic Wars Égyptienne ("Egyptian woman"), or Egypt, which commemorated Napoleon's Egyptian Campaign, was a popular name for French vessels, including naval vessels and privateers. Between 1799 and 1804, warships of the Royal Navy captured one French frigate and five different French privateers all with the name Égyptienne, and at least one privateer with the name Égypte.

== Égypte conquise ==
- Égypte conquise was a French privateer out of Guadeloupe that the USS Pickering captured on 17 October 1799.
- Égypte conquise (1799 ship), a privateer based in Guadeloupe. On 28 May 1801, some 80 leagues (390 km) to windward of Barbados, HMS Heureux pursued and captured the 16-gun French sloop Égypte from Guadeloupe. The pursuit lasted 16 hours while Égypte kept up a running fight for three hours. She had a crew of 103 men, and during the engagement apparently had neither inflicted nor suffered any casualties. Bland reported that Égypte was said to be the fastest vessel out of Guadeloupe. She had sailed 13 days earlier but had made no captures.

== Egyptian ==
- Egyptian was a French prize that entered Lloyd's Register in 1800. She was of 563 tons (bm), and 22 guns. She made three voyages as a Liverpool-based slave ship until she was condemned in the Americas in 1806 after having disembarked her onvicts.

== Égyptien ==
- Égyptien (1799 fluyt), a fluyt.
- Égyptien (1799 privateer), a privateer brig. She might be the Égyptienne captured by HMS Mercury (see below). She was under the command of Louis Mosqueron or Margereau, displaced 74 tons, and carried 56 men and 16 guns.
- Égyptien (1800 ship), a xebec. Built in Sicily, coppered-hulled, she was used as a storeship in Toulon from April 1804 and is not mentioned after 1807.

== Égyptienne ==
- Égyptienne (1798 ship), a privateer based in Bordeaux. His Majesty's schooner HMS Netley captured the first French ship named Égyptienne on record, on 1 May 1799. Égyptienne, a privateer schooner, was pierced for 14 guns but only carried eight, four of which she had thrown overboard while trying to evade capture. She had only 35 men on board, having recently taken four neutral vessels as prizes. Netley had herself recaptured one of these, a galiot carrying a cargo of wine from Oporto.
- Égyptienne (1797): HMS Solebay captured her on 23 November 1799. This Égyptienne was of 300 tons burthen, was armed with 18 guns and had a crew of 140 men. She was sailing from Cape François to Jacquemel. Drake, under Commander John Perkins, was in company with Solebay.
- French frigate Égyptienne (1799), a 24-pounder a Forte-class frigate designed by Fr. Caro. The British captured the French frigate Égyptienne on 2 September 1801, after the fall of Alexandria. This Égyptienne then served in the Royal Navy under the same name until 1817 when she was broken up.
- The French frigate Railleuse was a 32-gun frigate built in 1777. She was sold and commissioned in 1800 as the privateer Égyptienne. On 27 March 1804 HMS Hippomenes captured Égyptienne. Égyptienne mounted 36 guns and carried a crew of 250 men. She did not surrender until after a 54-hour-long chase and a running fight of over three hours. The Royal Navy took Égyptienne into service as the prison ship HMS Antigua.
- Égyptienne (1812), a Licorne-class fluyt.

== Incidents involving ships of similar names ==
- On 5 February 1800, HMS Mercury captured the French privateer brig Égyptienne off the Isle of Wight. This Égyptienne mounted 15 brass guns and had a crew of 66 men. She had sailed from Cherbourg the evening before and had not yet taken any prizes. As she was striking her colours her crew suddenly discharged a volley of small arms fire that slightly wounded one man on Mercury. Mercury sent Egyptian into Portsmouth.
- HMS Incendiary, a fire ship, captured another French privateer brig Égyptienne (or Égyptien) in the Mediterranean on 12 May 1800. This Égyptienne was armed with eight guns and had a crew of 50 men.
Ships of the French Navy named Égyptienne
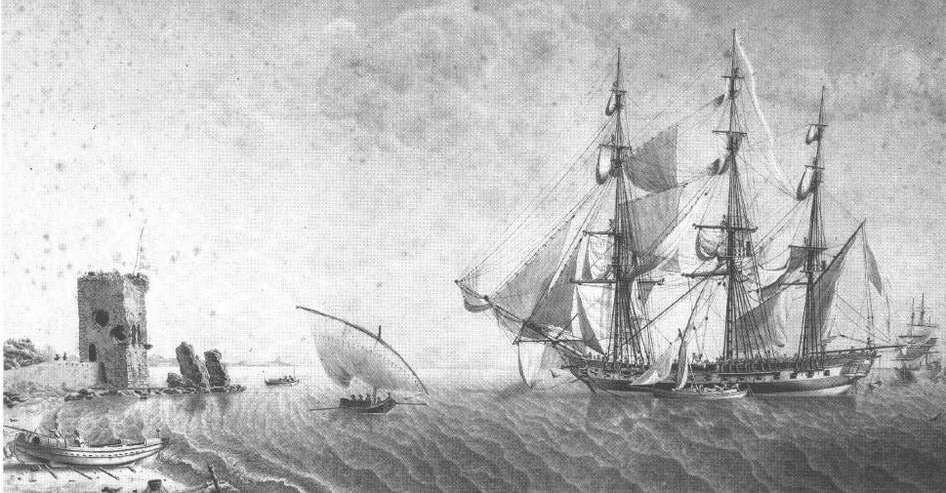
Portrait of Égyptienne (1799) by Jean-Jacques Baugean

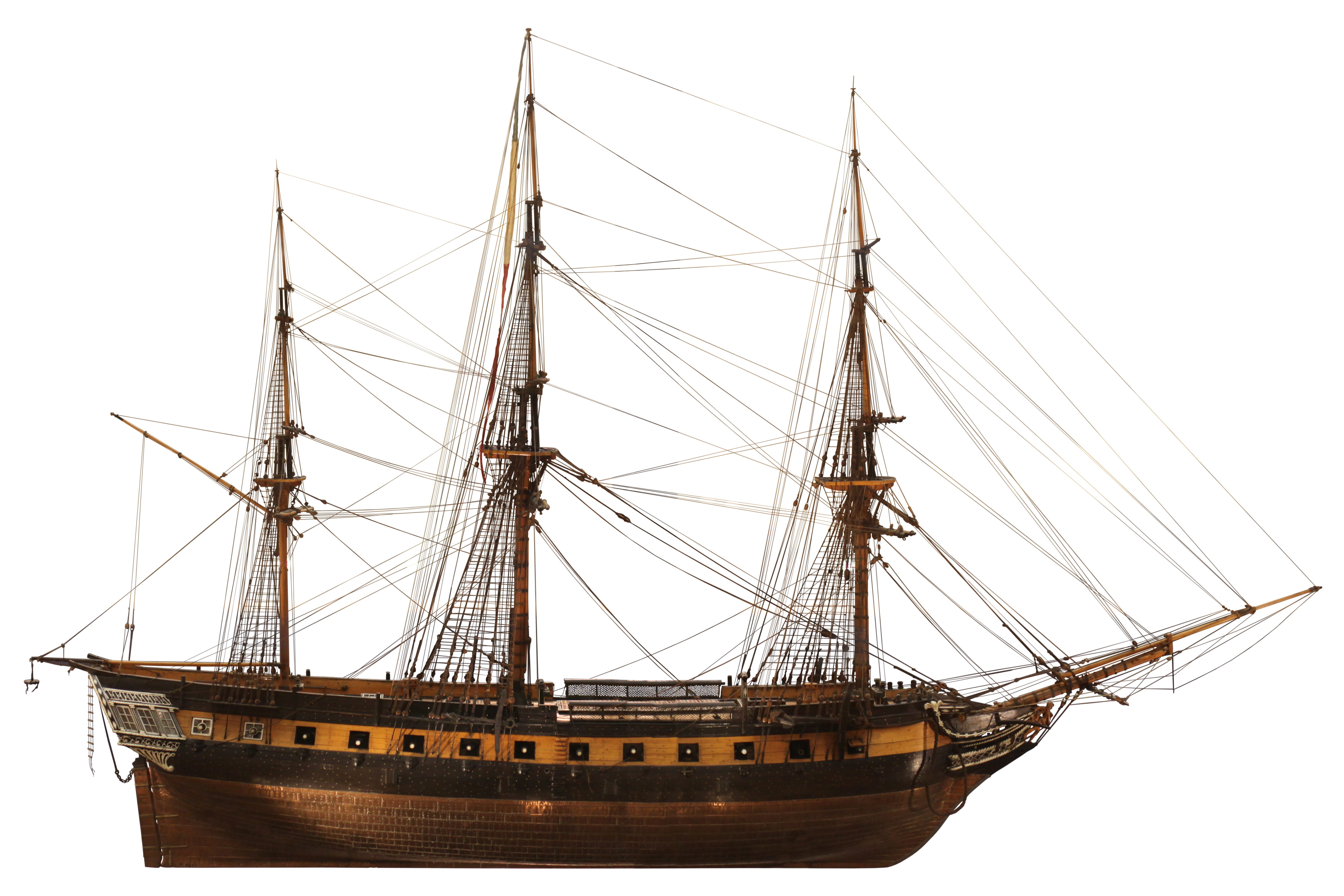
Model of Égyptienne (1812), part of the Trianon model collection
