= Pierre-Henri Philibert =

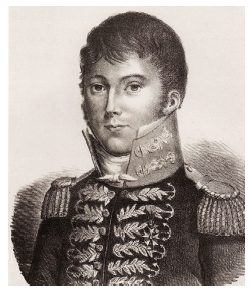
- Pierre-Henri Philibert
- Born: 24 January 1774; Saint-Denis, La Réunion
- Died: 31 October 1824; Paris
- Allegiance: France
- Service / branch: French Navy
- Rank: Captain

Pierre-Henri Philibert (24 January 1774 in Saint-Denis, Île Bourbon – 31 October 1824 in Paris) was a French Navy officer.

== Career ==
Philibert was born the family of a Navy civil servant. He joined the Navy in 1786.

During the French Revolution, on 16 November 1793, Philibert was promoted to Ensign. He rose to Lieutenant in 1803, and served as aid to Rear-Admiral Magon on the 74-gun Algésiras. He took part in the Battle of Trafalgar, distinguishing himself by recapturing Algésiras after the battle and sailing her back to Cádiz.

By June 1809, Philibert was in command of Sapho, on which he voyaged to India. (Note: Roche (p. 405) lists Philibert as a Commander (capitaine de frégate); both Bonnefoux and the Fonds Marine of the Ministry of Defence list him as a Lieutenant at this time.) Sapho sailed from Bordeaux to Port-des-Barques between around 1 July. Philibert was promoted to Commander in 1811, after 26 April.

From 7 October 1813, Philibert led a frigate division, comprising Étoile and Sultane, under Abel Aubert du Petit-Thouars, to engage in commerce raiding. Philibert commanded the French forces at the Battle of Jobourg, where both frigates of his squadron were captured.

Philibert was promoted to Captain (second class) in 1814. By 1815, Philibert was a Knight in the Legion of Honour and the Order of Saint Louis.

At the end of the Hundred Days, Philibert was in command of the frigate Saale and led a squadron comprising her and Méduse, under Captain Ponée. A historic rumour has it that with Napoléon's armies in disarray, Ponée proposed to have ferry Napoléon to America on Saale, while Méduse would have engaged HMS Bellerophon in a hopeless battle to prevent her from giving chase. Whether the plan was indeed ever formulated or not, it was never implemented, and Napoléon instead abdicated for the second time. From 14 April 1815 to 15 December, he conducted a mission to India on his frigate, by then renamed to Amphitrite. In 1816, he was in command of a full division, comprising the fluyts Licorne, under Lieutenant and later Commander Rouvroy de Saint-Simon, and Éléphant, under Commander de Cheffontaines, in addition to Amphitrite. By 1817, the Division further comprised the frigate Cybèle, under Captain Achille de Kergariou; the storeships Alouette, under Lieutenant Rigodit, and Girouette, under Ensign Lemaarant de Kerdaniel; and the merchantman Célestine and Louise. In 1818, the Division comprised Cybèle, the fluyts Normande and Rhône and the storeship Durance.

In 1820, Philibert commander the Expédition d'Asie, with his flag on Rhône and later on Durance. His voyages are credited for bringing vanilla to La Réunion, creating the Bourbon vanilla cultivar.

He was promoted to Officer on the Legion of Honour in 1821, and Captain (1st class) in 1822.

== Notes and references ==
=== Bibliography ===
- "Fonds Marine. Campagnes (opérations; divisions et stations navales; missions diverses). Inventaire de la sous-série Marine BB4. Tome deuxième : BB4 1 à 482 (1790-1826)" (PDF). servicehistorique.sga.defense.gouv.fr. Service historique du Ministère de la Défense. Archived from the original (PDF) on 29 September 2015.
- Guérin, Léon (1857). Histoire maritime de France (in French). Vol. 6. Dufour et Mulat.
- Roche, Jean-Michel (2005). Dictionnaire des bâtiments de la flotte de guerre française de Colbert à nos jours. Vol. 1. Group Retozel-Maury Millau. p. 169. ISBN 978-2-9525917-0-6. OCLC 165892922.
