= Aimable Joséphine (1809 ship) =

Ship

History

France
- Name: Aimable Joséphine
- Builder: Louis and Mathurin Crucy, Basse-Indre, Nantes
- Laid down: 1808
- Launched: February 1809
- Commissioned: January 1810
- Fate: Captured 1810

General characteristics
- Displacement: 330 tons (French)
- Tons burthen: 173, or 22769/94 (bm)
- Length: Overall:30.86 m (101.2 ft); Keel:24.04 m (78.9 ft); Or:94 ft 0 in (28.7 m)
- Beam: 7.20 m (23.6 ft), or 23 ft 9 1/2 in (7.3 m)
- Draught: 3.25 m (10.7 ft)
- Complement: 108
- Armament: 4 × 6-pounder guns + 8 × 12-pounder carronades

Aimable Joséphine was launched in February 1809 and commissioned in January 1810 at Nantes. Captain Veillon sailed from Nantes in January 1810 with 108 men and 12 guns.

On 13 February 1810 Lloyd's List reported that the French privateer Aimable Josephine had captured the merchantman Elizabeth, Briant, master, as Elizabeth was sailing from Liverpool to Africa.

HMS Narcissus captured Aimable Joséphine on 5 February. Captain the Honourable Frederick Aylmer, of Narcissus reported that she was armed with 14 guns and had a crew of 105 men.

Aimable Josephine was offered for sale by auction at Plymouth on 16 March 1810. She was described as being quite new and pierced for 18 guns.
