= Portsmouth Harbour: The Hulks =

Painting by Edward William Cooke

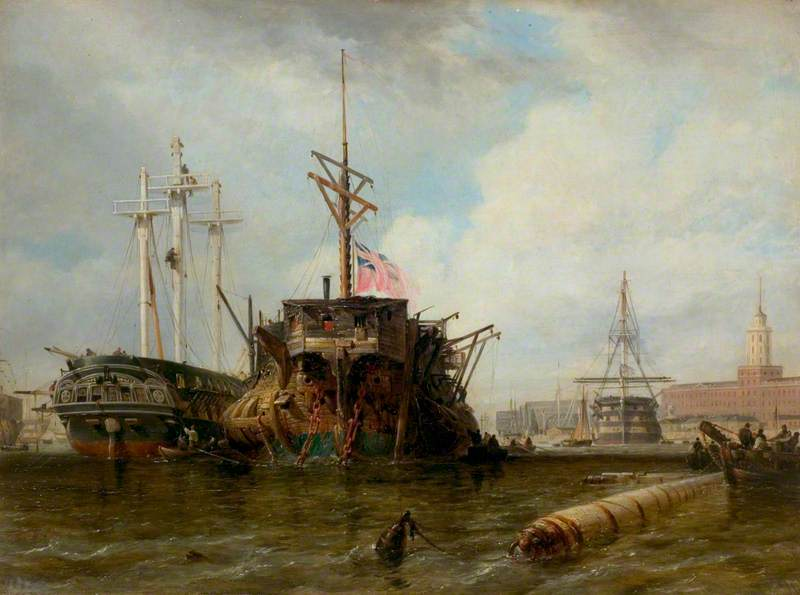
- Artist: Edward William Cooke
- Year: 1836
- Type: Oil on panel, maritime painting
- Dimensions: 29.9 cm × 40.6 cm (11.8 in × 16.0 in)
- Location: Victoria and Albert Museum; London

Portsmouth Harbour: The Hulks is an oil on canvas landscape painting by the English artist Edward William Cooke, from 1836. It is held at the Victoria and Albert Museum, in London.

== History and description ==
Depicting a scene of the British naval base of Portsmouth, it includes former French frigate Étoile, captured by the Royal Navy during the Napoleonic Wars, and now reduced to a hulk.

Cooke was a protégé of the artist Clarkson Stanfield, who became known for his maritime scenes. He also did several similar paintings. Stanfield had also painted the port in his 1831 work Portsmouth Harbour.

The painting was displayed at the British Institution's annual exhibition held at Pall Mall in 1837 and an engraving was produced based on it. It was acquired by the art collector John Sheepshanks. Today is in the collection of the Victoria and Albert Museum in South Kensington having been acquired as part of the major Sheepshanks Gift the by John Sheepshanks in 1857.

== Bibliography ==
- Munday, John. Edward William Cooke: A Man of His Time. Antique Collectors' Club, 1996.
- Roe, Sonia. Oil Paintings in Public Ownership in the Victoria and Albert Museum. Public Catalogue Foundation, 2008.
- Van der Merwe, Pieter & Took, Roger. The Spectacular Career of Clarkson Stanfield. Tyne and Wear County Council Museums, 1979.
