= HMS Pactolus (1813) =

Royal Navy fifth-rate frigate

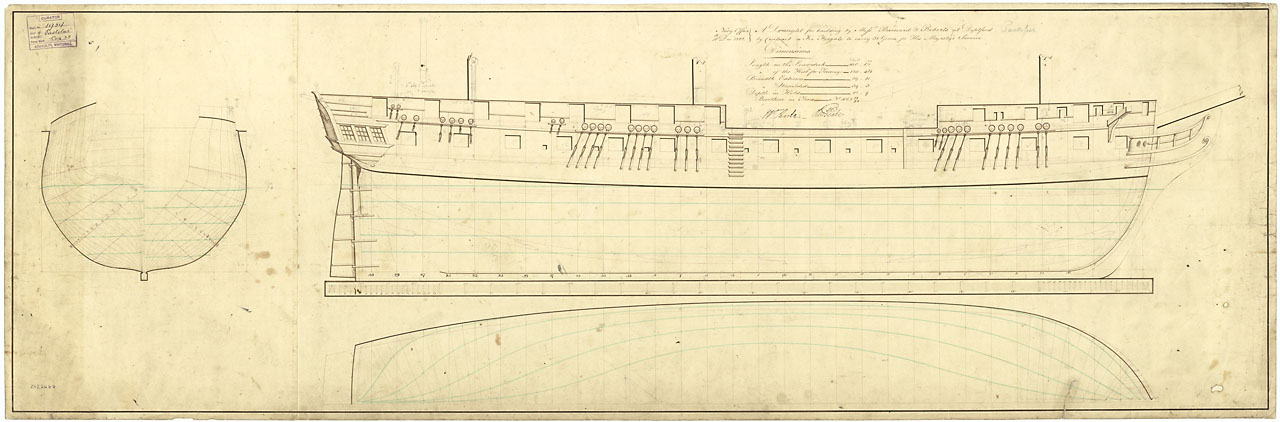
- Drawing of the profile of the Pactolus, from the archives of the Royal Museums Greenwich

History

United Kingdom
- Name: HMS Pactolus
- Ordered: 16 November 1812
- Builder: Mrs Frances Barnard, Deptford
- Laid down: January 1813
- Launched: 14 August 1813
- Completed: By 30 October 1813
- Fate: Sold to be broken up in January 1818

General characteristics
- Class & type: Cydnus-class fifth-rate frigate
- Tons burthen: 1,06588/94 (bm)
- Length: 150 ft 2 3/4 in (45.8 m) (overall); 125 ft 6 1/8 in (38.3 m) (keel)
- Beam: 39 ft 11 1/2 in (12.2 m)
- Depth of hold: 12 ft 9 1/2 in (3.9 m)
- Sail plan: Full-rigged ship
- Complement: 315
- Armament: Upper deck: 28 × 18-pounder guns; QD: 14 × 32-pounder carronades; Fc: 2 × 9-pounder guns + 2 × 32-pounder carronades

HMS Pactolus was one of eight 38-gun Cydnus-class fifth-rate frigates of the Royal Navy, that served in the Napoleonic Wars and the War of 1812. She was one of the warships that bombarded Stonington, Connecticut, from 9 to 12 August 1814. Pactolus was paid off in August 1817 and sold in 1818.

== Construction ==
Cydnus-class frigates such as Pactolus were actually Leda-class frigates, but built of red fir (pine). Pine was cheaper and more abundant than oak and permitted noticeably faster construction, but at a cost of a reduced lifespan. The motive for the use of red pine – an inferior material for shipbuilding – was speed of construction. It was much quicker to build a ship with this material than one of oak; the drawback was that these fir-built ships were less durable than oak-built ships.

Like all the 38-gun British frigates of the late Napoleonic wars period, she carried twenty-eight 18-pounder guns on the upper deck, fourteen 32-pounder carronades on the quarterdeck, and two 9-pounder guns and another two 32-pounder carronades on the forecastle. Under the re-classifications in February 1817, this resulted in her being re-classed from 38 to 46 guns.

== Service ==
Pactolus was commissioned in September 1813 under Captain Frederick William Aylmer. He would remain her captain to the end of 1815. On 24 March Pactolus recaptured the Swedish ship Maria Christina while in company with Seahorse and another warship. (Note: The prize money for Aylmer was £187 3s 3 3/4d; the prize money for an ordinary seaman was £2 2s 4 1/2d. For an ordinary seaman, this would have amounted to about six weeks' wages.)

On 8 August 1814 Pactolus was part of a small squadron made up of herself, the brig Dispatch and the bomb vessel Terror, all under the command of Captain Sir Thomas Hardy in Ramillies. Together, the vessels attacked Stonington, Connecticut. Stonington was known for preparing and harbouring "torpedoes", that is naval mines, and for supporting American attempts to destroy British warships off New London.

Action commenced on 9 August, when Dispatch anchored within pistol shot of a battery on shore and opened fire, which the battery answered. The water was too shallow for Pactolus to follow, so Dispatch withdrew, having suffered casualties of two men dead and twelve wounded. On 11 August Terror lobbed shells into the town. Ramillies and Pactolus then anchored as close to the town as they could and opened fire, doing a great deal of damage. As they started their bombardment, the Americans withdrew their guns from the battery to the outskirts of town where a large force of militia had gathered. Hardy then withdrew.

Pactolus was one of some seven ships that shared in the capture of the Spanish brig Patriota on 6 September. (Note: A captain's share of the prize money was £6 2s 4d; an ordinary seaman's share was 1s 1 3/4d. For an ordinary seaman this was about one day's pay.) On 6 November Pactolus was in company with Telegraph and Majestic when they recaptured the brig Recovery.

On 7 December 1814 Pactolus captured the schooner Armistice, of 3 guns, 15 men and 143 tons. A privateer later recaptured Armistice, but then Junon re-recaptured the schooner. Two days later, Pactolus captured the schooner Post Bay of 8 men and 73 tons.

Pactolus returned to Britain and on 9 July 1815 sailed up the Gironde, together with Hebrus and Falmouth. Pactolus was on a mission to treat with the authorities in Bordeaux over the reestablishment of the monarchy in France. Though the British squadron was under a flag of truce, the fort at Verdon opened fire on them, but without effect. The next day the French evacuated the fort and a British landing party dismantled and destroyed the guns. Over the next few days they destroyed several more French forts in the area. The British took possession of the forts of Verdon, Royan, de Lotisac, and Miche, which they completely dismantled. They took nearly 70 pieces of heavy artillery (mostly French thirty-six-pounders), including many mortars, all of which they completely spiked and whose carriages they rendered useless. On 22 July Bordeaux declared for the monarchy as French troops, which Hebrus had brought with her on two transports, took control.

In January 1816 Captain William Hugh Dobbie took command of Pactolus for the Halifax, Nova Scotia, station. Pactolus was sent to the Halifax station for a 3 year tour of duty in 1816. She sailed to Bermuda, arriving on 15 June 1816. She was reported as being moored in Bermuda during June and July 1816. On 24 August 1816, she arrived at Halifax, from Bermuda. She and the Saracen accompanied Forth, the flagship of Admiral Griffith, to spend the winter at Bermuda, setting sail from Halifax on 10 November 1816.

She departed Halifax on 16 June 1817. In July 1817 Pactolus returned to Portsmouth.

== Fate ==
Pactolus was paid off in August 1817 as being no longer seaworthy due to dry rot. The Admiralty sold her to Mr. Maund for £2,790 on 29 January 1818.
