= HMS Severn (1813) =

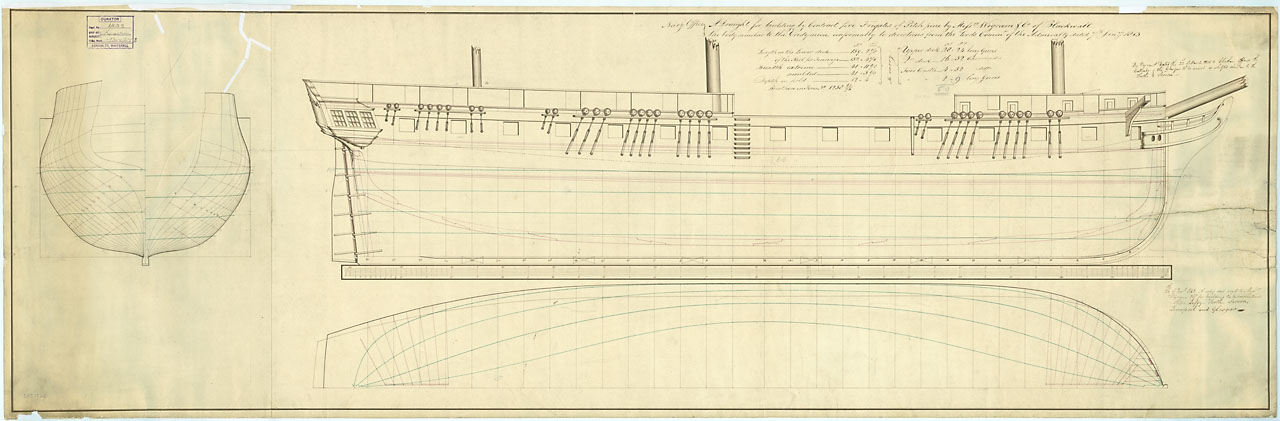
- Ship's plan for Severn

History

United Kingdom
- Name: HMS Severn
- Ordered: 4 May 1812
- Builder: Wigram, Wells & Green, Blackwall Yard
- Laid down: January 1813
- Launched: 14 June 1813
- Completed: 11 September 1813
- Honours and awards: Naval General Service Medal with clasp "Algiers"
- Fate: Sold for breaking up, 20 July 1825

General characteristics
- Class & type: Endymion-class frigate (revived)
- Tons burthen: 1,25487/94 bm (as designed)
- Length: 159 ft 2 5/8 in (48.530 m) (gundeck); 132 ft 2 in (40.28 m) (keel)
- Beam: 41 ft 3 in (12.57 m)
- Draught: 9 ft 9 in (2.97 m) unladen; 12 ft 8 in (3.86 m) (laden)
- Depth of hold: 12 ft 4 in (3.76 m)
- Propulsion: Sail
- Speed: 14.4 knots (26.7 km/h; 16.6 mph)
- Complement: 300 (later 340)
- Armament: UD: 28 × 24-pounder guns; QD: 16 × 32-pounder carronades; Fc: 2 × 9-pounder guns and 4 × 32-pounder carronades

HMS Severn was an Endymion-class frigate of the British Royal Navy, launched in 1813 as one of five heavy frigates built to match the powerful American frigates. The shortage of oak meant that she was built of "fir" (actually pine), which meant a considerably shortened lifespan. Nonetheless, the ship saw useful service, especially at the bombardment of Algiers in 1816, before being broken up in 1825.

== Background ==
Severn was ordered as a Leda-class frigate of 38 guns, and was to have borne the name Tagus. Responding to pressure from large American frigates during the war of 1812, the Admiralty amended the order to a copy of the successful lines of HMS Endymion. Relative to her prototype, she received two more guns forward, and, to speed her launch, was directed to be constructed of "fir." Tagus was renamed Severn on 7 January 1813, i.e., well before her launching.

== War of 1812 ==
Initially commissioned under the command of Captain Joseph Nourse, Severn served in the North Atlantic. On 18 January 1814 she was escorting a convoy from England to Bermuda when she encountered the French 40-gun frigates Sultane and Étoile. Severn drew them away from the convoy, saving it. After a long chase, the French frigates gave up and sailed away. (Note: Hannibal captured Sultane on 27 March 1814. Hebrus captured Étoile that same day in a notable single-ship action.)

Later the same year, on 1 May, she captured the American privateer schooner Yankee Lass, armed with nine guns and carrying a crew of 80 men. She was 20 days out of Rhode Island and had not made any captures. (Note: Yankee Lass, Bristol, Rhode Island, and of 107 tons (bm), was under the command of Benjamin K. Churchill. She had been commissioned on 4 April 1814.) At the time, Severn was in company with Surprise. (Note: In September 1815 prize money was paid for Yankee Lass. A first-class share was worth £40 6s 3d; a sixth-class share was worth 4s 6 3/4d.)

Severn was among the several British warships that shared in the proceeds of the capture on 10 July of the American schooners William, Eliza, Union, and Emmeline, and the capture on 2 July of the schooner Little Tom. (Note: For the first four schooners a first-class share was worth £20 6s 0 1/2d; a sixth-class share was worth 2s 7d. For the cargo of the Little Tom, a first-class share was worth £6 17s 3 1/2d; a sixth-class share was worth 11 1/2d.)

In the late summer and autumn of 1814, Severn was an important participant in the War of 1812, as she was stationed in Chesapeake Bay to blockade the Patuxent River. It was from this point that the British launched their invasion of Maryland, which led to the Battle of Bladensburg and then the subsequent burning of Washington D.C. On 2 July Severn and Loire captured two schooners, two gun-boats, and a sloop. They also destroyed a large store of tobacco.

On 20 August Severn, the frigate Hebrus, and the gun-brig Manly sailed up the Patuxent to follow the boats as far as possible. Admiral Alexander Cochrane and his force of marines and seamen entered Washington on the night of 24 August. The British then burnt the White House, the Treasury, and the War Office. They left at 9 o'clock on the evening of the next day and returned to Nottingham, Maryland, on the Patuxent where Cochrane boarded Manly. The campaign cost the Navy one man killed and six wounded, including one man of the Corps of Colonial Marines killed and three wounded. (Note: Prize-money arising from the booty captured by the expedition in the River Patuxent, at Fort Washington, and Alexandria, between 22 and 29 August 1814, was paid in November 1817. Nourse, as captain, received a first-class share, which was worth £183 9s 1 3/4d; a sixth-class share, which was what an ordinary seaman would receive, was worth £1 9s 3 1/2d. A second and final payment came in May 1819. A first-class share was worth £42 13s 10 3/4d; a sixth-class share was worth 9s 1 3/4d.) (Note: In 1817 there was a further payment of prize money for the expedition in the River Patuxent, at Fort Washington, and Alexandria, between 22 and 29 August 1814. A first-class share was worth £183 9s 1 3/4d; a sixth-class share was worth £1 19s 3 1/2d.)

The draught of this class of frigate was too deep to permit Severn and her sister ships from sailing into the harbour at Baltimore. Her sailors had to kedge rafts holding small cannon and rocket launchers seven miles up the river to Fort McHenry. During the attack on Baltimore Admiral Sir George Cockburn raised his flag on Severn. Although the navy contributed seamen and marines to the land attack, and took casualties, Severn did not suffer any losses.

Between 1 October 1814 and 25 March 1815, Severn captured thirteen mostly small American merchant vessels, but with several armed vessels among them. These were:

- schooner Speedwell, of five men and 34 tons;
- brig May Flower, of 8 men 60 tons;
- ship Anna Marie, of six men and 120 tons;
- ship Betsy;
- ship Virginia;
- schooner Nonsuch, of five men and 65 tons;
- ship Buonaparte;
- ship Anna;
- schooner Virginia;
- schooner Brant;
- ship Necessity, of four guns, 12 men, and 309 tons;
- schooner Amelia, of 40 tons;
- schooner Resolution; and
- privateer brig Ino, of nine guns, 130 men, and 250 tons.

On 20 December Severn also captured the American letter of marque schooner Banyer. Banyer was armed with four guns and carried a crew of 31 men. (Note: This was almost surely Bangor, of 216 tons (bm), which had been commissioned on 3 August 1814 under Captain John Barry.) (Note: Head money for the Banyer was paid in 1817. A first-class share was worth £24 5s 6 1/2d; a sixth-class share was worth 2s 6 3/4d.)

On 10 January 1815, Cockburn landed on Cumberland Island in an effort to tie up American forces and keep them from joining other American forces to help defend New Orleans, Louisiana, and the Gulf Coast. The naval squadron consisted of Dragon (74-guns), Regulus (44 guns; en flute), Brune (56 guns; en flute), Severn, Hebrus (36 guns), Rota (38 guns), Primrose (18 guns), Terror and Devastation (both bomb vessels of 8 guns), and the schooners Canso (10 guns) and Whiting (12 guns).

Five days later a British force first bombarded and then landed near Fort Peter on Point Peter by the town of St. Marys. The British attacked and took the fort without suffering any casualties. They then headed for St. Marys along the St. Mary's River and captured it after skirmishing with a small American force. The British captured two American gunboats and 12 merchantmen, including the East Indiaman Countess of Harcourt, which an American privateer had captured on her way from India to London. The British ended their occupation of St. Marys after about a week and withdrew to Cumberland Island.

On 26 February 1815, Severn recaptured the merchantman Adventure, which she sent in to Bermuda. This earned Severn salvage money for the vessel and her cargo. (Note: A first-class share was worth £85 8s 10d; a sixth-class share was worth 13s 9d.)

Lastly, on 3 March, Severn destroyed the American privateer Ino (see above). (Note: Ino was on her second cruise, this one under Captain John White. She had been commissioned on 15 December 1814. American records show her as a brig of 193 tons (bm).) (Note: A first-class share of the head money was worth £130 10s 6 1/2d; a sixth-class share was worth 15s 0 1/4d.) American accounts report that Ino grounded outside of Charleston on 7 March. As her crew was attempting to free Ino, Severn came on the scene and launched her boats to board Ino. Ino's crew, unaware that the war had ended on 15 February 1815, fired grapeshot and small arms at the British boats, causing them to shear off. Ino's crew then set fire to her and took to their boats and some improvised rafts. A schooner that came out from Charleston rescued almost all. Ino's crew believed that Captain Nourse of Severn had known for some days that the war had ended. The delay of payment of the head money may have been due to the need to adjudicate the case.

She returned to Portsmouth on 7 May 1815.

== Post-war ==
Severn was fitted at Chatham for foreign service between February and July 1816. In February the Hon. Frederick W. Aylmer assumed command of Severn. He then sailed her to Gibraltar and then took part in the bombardment of Algiers on 27 August. British casualties were heavy, though those of the Algerines were much heavier. Severn herself had three men killed and 34 wounded. As a result of the attack, the Dey agreed to abolish the enslavement of Christians in perpetuity, and to free all slaves whatsoever then in Algiers. The British also destroyed four large frigates, five large corvettes, numerous gunboats, and numerous merchant vessels. King Ferdinand of the Two Sicilies bestowed on Aylmer the cross of a Commander of the Royal Sicilian Order of St. Ferdinand and of Merit. Other captains and officers received similar awards. In May 1818 the participants in the battle were granted an award of £100,000. (Note: A first-class share was worth £1068 11s 6 1/2d; a sixth-class share was worth £4 10s 2 1/2d.) In 1847 the Admiralty issued the Naval General Service Medal with clasp "Algiers" to the 1328 surviving claimants from the battle.

Severn initially remained in the Mediterranean, first under Captain James Gordon and then under Captain Robert Spencer. From May 1817 Severn saw service off the Kent and Sussex coasts in the Royal Naval Coast Blockade for the Prevention of Smuggling. under the command of Captain William ("Flogging Joey") McCulloch, scourge of the smugglers.

On 6 August 1817 she seized a boat with foreign spirits and five empty boats. (Note: A first-class share was worth £28 6s 10d; a sixth-class share was worth 2s 1 1/2d.) Three weeks later she seized Mary, with four smugglers and a quantity of tea, and also seized two empty boats. (Note: A first-class share was worth £25 13s 4d; a sixth-class share was worth 1s 10 1/2d.)

On 15 December Severn seized Po, which was carrying a cargo of foreign spirits. (Note: A first-class share was worth £24 9s 11d; a sixth-class share was worth 1s 8 1/2d.) On 29 March 1818 Severn seized Linot, which was carrying foreign spirits, and two smugglers. (Note: A first-class share was worth £73 5s 8d; a sixth-class share was worth 5s 2 1/2d.)

== Fate ==
Severn was in ordinary at Portsmouth in 1822, but by 1824 was at Deptford. She was put up for sale in June 1825 at Deptford, and sold to John Small Sedger, Rotherhithe, for £3,610 on 20 July.
