= Elizabeth (1786 ship) =

British slave, naval, and merchant ship (1786–1810)

History

Great Britain
- Name: Elizabeth
- Owner: 1802:Richard Buller, Francis Ingram, & William Ingram; 1805:William Brade, James Brade, William Smith, & Richard Haton
- Builder: Bermuda
- Launched: 1786 or 1790
- Fate: Captured c.December 1809 or January 1810

General characteristics
- Tons burthen: 20458/94, or 206, or 207 (bm)
- Complement: 1804:30; 1805:25
- Armament: 1804:14 × 6-pounder guns; 1805:12 × 6-pounder guns; 1808:10 × 6-pounder carronades; 1811:16 × 6-pounder guns
- Notes: Built mostly of Bermuda cedar

Elizabeth was launched at Bermuda in 1786 or 1790. She first appeared in Lloyd's Register (LR), in 1802. She then made four voyages as a slave ship in the triangular trade in enslaved people. During the second of these voyages a French privateer captured her. After the end of British participation in the trans-Atlantic trade in enslaved people, she spent a little over a year as a hired armed tender under contract to the British Royal Navy. She returned to mercantile service trading with Madeira or Africa, until another French privateer captured her in early 1810.

== Career ==
Elizabeth entered LR in 1802 with C. Breer, master, Ingram & Co., owner, and trade Liverpool–Africa.

=== Transporting enslaved people ===
1st voyage transporting enslaved people (1802–1803): Captain Christopher Brew sailed from Liverpool on 10 June 1802, for Africa. In 1802, 147 vessels sailed from English ports bound for Africa to acquire and transport enslaved people; 122 of these vessels sailed from Liverpool.

Elizabeth arrived at Trinidad on 28 February 1803, where she landed 225. She left Trinidad on 5 April and arrived back at Liverpool on 30 May. She had left Liverpool with 24 crew members and she suffered 2 crew deaths on the voyage.

2nd voyage transporting enslaved people (1803–1804): War with France had resumed while Elizabeth was on her first slave trading voyage. Before Brew set out on his second voyage, he acquired a letter of marque on 6 January 1804. He sailed from Liverpool for the Bight of Benin on 26 January. In 1804, 147 vessels sailed from English ports bound for Africa to acquire and transport enslaved people; 120 of these vessels sailed from Liverpool.

Elizabeth acquired captives at Lagos/Onim.

Lloyd's List reported on 14 September 1804 that the French privateer Grande Decide had captured Elizabeth. (Note: Grand Décidé was a privateer under Mathieu Goy, commissioned in Guadeloupe in January 1804. She had a crew of 220 men and was armed with twenty-two 8-pounder guns.) By one report the French took Elizabeth into Guadeloupe. It is unknown how many enslaved people Elizabeth had embarked and how many she landed at Basse-Terre. She had left Liverpool with 31 crew members and had one crew death on her voyage. (Note: French reports state that Grande Decide had captured a Guineaman of 20 guns and 310 captives. Grande Decide took 200 "choice slaves" off the Guineaman and brought them into Pointe Pitre on 28 September.)

In July, HMS Centaur recaptured Elizabeth, of Liverpool, that "Decidé" had captured while Elizabeth was sailing from the coast of Africa with a cargo of enslaved people.

3rd voyage transporting enslaved people (1805–1806): Elizabeth returned to Liverpool and new ownership. On 2 August 1805 Captain James Brown acquired a letter of marque. Elizabeth sailed from Liverpool on 15 September 1805, bound for Africa.

Elizabeth arrived at Dominica on 10 March 1806. It is unknown how many captives Elizabeth had embarked and how many she landed. She had left Liverpool with 32 crew members and suffered 12 crew deaths on her voyage. She also underwent some small repairs after she returned.

4th voyage transporting enslaved people (1806–1807): Captain Brown sailed from Liverpool on 17 July 1806, bound for the Bight of Biafra and the Gulf of Guinea islands.

Elizabeth acquired captives at New Calabar and arrived at Kingston, Jamaica, on 31 January 1807. She arrived with 313 captives, but it is not clear how many she embarked, and how many she finally landed. She left Jamaica on 13 April and arrived back at Liverpool on 5 June. She had left Liverpool with 34 crew members and she suffered seven crew deaths on her voyage.

On 10 February 1807 the Parliament of the United Kingdom passed An Act for the Abolition of the Slave Trade, which prohibited the trade in enslaved people in the British Empire. Only vessels that had cleared outbound prior to 1 May were permitted to set out on a last legal voyage.

=== Hired armed tender ===
Elizabeth needed a new trade. She next served under the Royal Navy under contract from 22 January 1808 to 27 April 1809 as a hired armed tender.

=== Merchantman ===
Entries in Lloyd's Register and the Register of Shipping are indicative, not definitive. They were only as accurate as owners choose to keep them. Some discrepancies between the two sources are also due to differences in publication dates.

Year	Master	Owner	Trade	Source
1809	J.Brown; P. Coffe	Brade & Co.	Liverpool–Africa	Lloyd's Register (LR)
1809	Hamilton	Hamilton	Liverpool cruizer	Register of Shipping (RS)
1810	Coffee; J. Brien	Hamilton & Co.	Liverpool–Madeira	LR
1810	P.Coffee	Captain	Liverpool cruizer	RS
1811	J. Brien	M'Dowel	Liverpool–Africa	LR
1811	Bryant	Bryant	Liverpool–Madeira	RS

== Fate ==
On 13 February 1810 Lloyd's List reported that the French privateer Aimable Joséphine had captured Elizabeth, Briant, master, as Elizabeth was sailing from Liverpool to Africa. (Note: HMS Narcissus captured Aimable Josephine, of 14 guns and 105 men, on 5 February 1810.) Lloyd's Register for 1811 carried the annotation "captured" under Elizabeth's name.
