= French frigate Étoile (1813) =

French frigate

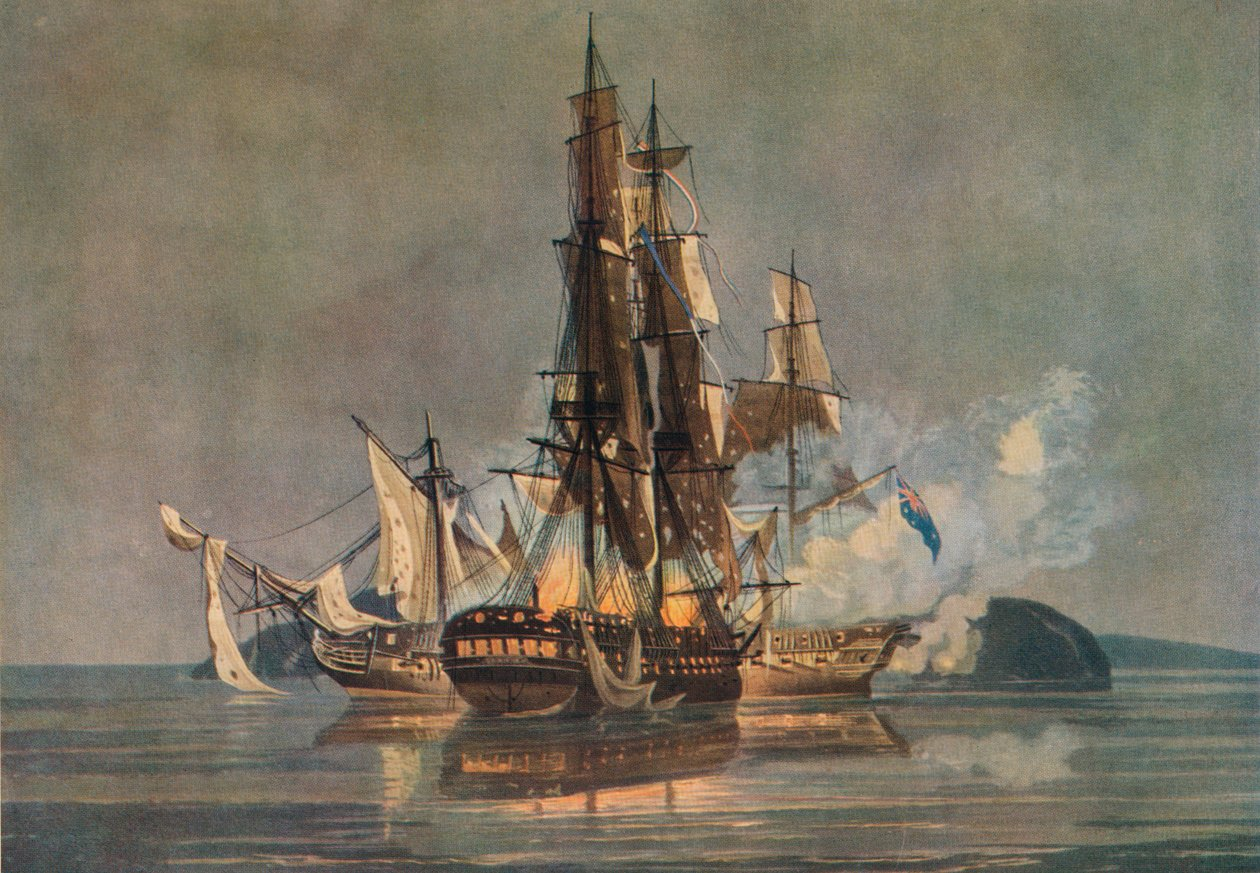
- Étoile (centre) at the Battle of Jobourg

History

France
- Name: Étoile
- Namesake: "Star"
- Ordered: 21 October 1809
- Builder: Nantes shipyard
- Laid down: 3 April 1810
- Launched: 28 July 1813
- Commissioned: 1 September 1813
- Captured: 27 March 1814

United Kingdom
- Name: Topaze
- Namesake: HMS Topaze (1793)
- Acquired: 27 March 1814 by capture
- Fate: Broken up 1851

General characteristics
- Class & type: Pallas-class fifth-rate frigate
- Displacement: 1080 tons
- Tons burthen: 106023/94 (bm)
- Length: 151 ft 5 3/8 in (46.161 m) (overall); 128 ft 8 1/8 in (39.221 m) (keel)
- Beam: 39 ft 8 in (12.09 m)
- Draught: 5.9 m (19 ft)
- Depth of hold: 12 ft 5 1/4 in (3.791 m)
- Propulsion: 1,950 m^{2} (21,000 sq ft) of sails
- Complement: French service: 326 British service: 315
- Armament: French service: 28 × 18-pounder long guns + carronades; British service; Upper deck: 28 × 18-pounder guns; QD: 14 × 32-pounder carronades; Fc: 2 × 9-pounder guns + 2 × 32-pounder carronades

Étoile was a 44-gun frigate of the French Navy, launched in 1813. The British captured her in 1814 and the Royal Navy took her into service as HMS Topaze. She did not go to sea again until 1818, and was paid off in 1822. She served as a receiving ship until 1850 and was broken up in 1851.

== French service ==
Initially, Étoile was in the Nantes Division, first under capitaine de vaisseau Le Bozec (27 July to 20 September), and then under capitaine de frégate Henri Pierre Philibert (7 October to 24 November).

She sailed for the Azores with Sultane to engage in commerce raiding. On 18 January 1814 HMS Severn was escorting a convoy from England to Bermuda when she encountered Sultane and Étoile. Severn drew them away from the convoy, saving it. After a long chase, the French frigates gave up and sailed away.

On 24 January, Sultane and Étoile engaged the frigates HMS Astraea and HMS Creole. The two British frigates had sailed for the Cape Verde Islands; they reached Maio early on 23 January 1814.

Off the Cape Verde Islands they encountered two frigates and two merchant ships, one a brigantine and the other a schooner, all at anchor. The French frigates did not respond to the Portuguese and Spanish flags that the British set and instead set sail as the British frigates approached; the British frigates then pursued them. Astraea had problems with her sails so Creole pulled ahead. She exchanged some shots and eventually four broadsides with the rearmost French frigate, which would turn out to be Sultane. Astraea then sailed between Creole and her opponent, coming alongside the French frigate. Two broadsides from Astraea then temporarily silenced the French frigate as fires aboard Creole took her out of the action for a while. She re-engaged Sultane, but then disengaged and sailed towards Santiago.

Astraea went ahead in pursuit of the first French frigate, which turned out to be Étoile. Astraea exchanged a broadside and then crossed Étoile's bow and raked her. At this moment a shot took away Astraea's wheel and killed both quartermasters, causing Astraea to lose direction and momentum. Now the situation reversed, with French guns nearly touching Astraea's taffrail. She received broadsides that tore away her lower rigging, scarred her deck and destroyed one of her carronades. However, she suffered no damage forward. Astrea was able to get starboard to starboard with her opponent. The two vessels exchanged broadsides at close range for two hours until Étoile sailed off. During the engagement a pistol shot hit Eveleigh below the heart, mortally wounding him. Sultane came up and also exchanged a broadside with Astraea. Astraea, much damaged, broke off the engagement as the two French frigates too sailed away. Creole had suffered ten men dead and 26 wounded; Astraea lost nine men dead and 37 wounded. That evening the two British ships anchored in Porto Praya on Santiago to effect repairs.

The British captured both Sultane and Étoile on 27 March as the two French frigates were returning from the Cape Verde Islands, in the Battle of Jobourg. Hannibal captured Sultane, without a fight.

Hebrus captured Étoile, but only after severe fighting. Hebrus chased Étoile for 15 hours and 120 miles, finally bringing her to action at about 1 a.m. on 27 March in the Bay of La Hogue. A fight lasting over two hours ensued, complicated by fire from shore batteries that could not, in the dark, distinguish their target. The winds fell, leaving the two vessels firing at each other from nearly the same spot. The French fired high, doing great damage to Hebrus's rigging; Hebrus from the start fired into Étoile's hull. Eventually Philibert struck, after having lost 40 men killed and 71 wounded. Hebrus had 13 men killed and 25 wounded.

In 1847 the Admiralty awarded the Naval General Service Medal with clasp "Hebrus Wh. L'Etoile" to the 40 still surviving claimants from the action. Also in 1847, the Admiralty issued gold medals to a select set of captains for certain particularly notable battles and engagements. Captain Edmund Palmer, of Hebrus, was one of the recipients.

== British service ==
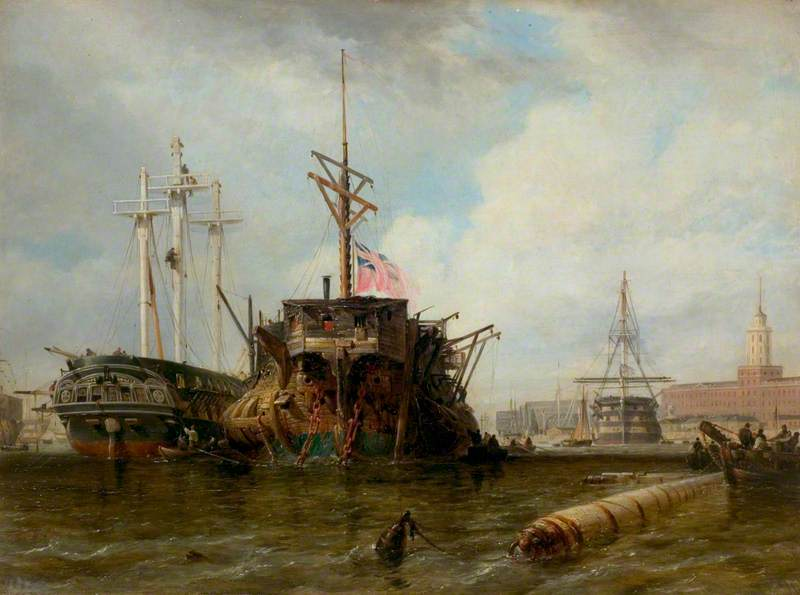
Portsmouth Harbour: The Hulks. The 1836 painting by Edward William Cooke depicts the ship as a receiving ship in Portsmouth.

The Royal Navy registered and renamed Étoile HMS Topaze on 15 June. She underwent repairs that lasted from end-March 1814 to end-February 1815, and the Navy then had her laid up.

Between March 1818 and 1 July she underwent repairs and fitting for sea duty. In April Captain John Richard Lumley commissioned her. He then sailed her to the East Indies.

On 19 October 1819, Topaze arrived at Mauritius from Ceylon with a number of crew ill from an unknown disease resembling cholera. The local authorities permitted the crew to land and the landing of the ill, bypassing quarantine. By 18 November the disease had spread to the local population. The locals deserted Port Louis and demanded that Topaze sail for the Seychelles to wait out the storm season there. Lumley initially refused, but by January assented. Topaze returned to Mauritius in April, and was put into quarantine, though the epidemic had passed, and there was repaired and thoroughly disinfected.

Topaze finally saw action in December 1820 at Mokha, Yemen. The British East India Company (EIC) government at Bombay had demanded redress for harm to British interests at Mokha from the Imaun of Senna. They were unsuccessful so the Governor-General of India authorized the sending of a squadron to Mokha. The EIC sent their Resident at Bushire, a Captain Bruce, as their Agent to negotiate, and to inform the local authorities at Mokha that a squadron was to follow. Rear-Admiral Sir Richard King, the commander-in-chief on the Royal Navy's East Indies Station, sent Lumley in Topaze, as overall commander. (Note: Yonge gives the name of the C-in-C as Admiral Graham Moore, but this appears incorrect.) The EIC also sent vessels from its Bombay Marine, as well as a company of artillery. The EIC sent its cruisers Benares (Commander Faithful) and Antelope (Lieutenant Robson), its bomb vessel Thames (Lieutenant Elwon), and the storeship Ernaad (Lieutenant Jones).

After a two-week voyage from Bombay, Topaze and the squadron arrived on 3 December, and bombarded Fort Taire, the North Fort the next day. A landing party attempted to storm the fort but its defenders had not left and they repelled the British. Topaze had four men killed and 16 wounded, two of whom died later. The Company had four men killed and eight wounded. Negotiations recommenced during a sequence of truces, again unsuccessfully.

On 26 December Topaze again bombarded the North Fort, this time driving out the defenders. A landing party was able to spike the guns and throw out their carriages. Between 26 and 30 December Topaze and the other vessels approached Fort Abdoufoof, the South Fort, and opened fire on the 30th. Here too they succeeded in driving out the defenders, and subsequently spiking the guns and destroying their carriages. Casualties were much lighter this time, with Topaze losing one marine killed and five wounded, and the Company having five men wounded. By 7 January 1821 the government of Mokha had acceded to the British terms.

Lumley died on 23 July 1821 as Topaze arrived at Prince of Wales' Island; his widow and infant daughter were on board at the time. He was buried at Penang.

Lumley's replacement was Commander J.L. Curry. Captain Charles Richardson replaced Curry. Richardson sailed Topaze from Penang to China. There local Chinese wounded 14 crewmen who were drawing water at Lintin Island. Cannon fire from Topaze killed two Chinese. Consequently, the Chinese expelled the British factory at Canton, and the EIC's ships in the Bocca Tigris also had to leave. Matters were settled in early 1822. Richardson then sailed Topaze back to India.

In May 1822 Commander Price Blackwood (acting) replaced Richardson. Topaze was paid off in October.

Between January and February 1823 Topaze underwent fitting as a receiving ship for Portsmouth. She then served in that role until 1850.

== Fate ==
In March 1850 Topaze became a target for HMS Excellent. Topaze was finally broken up in December 1851.
