= French fluyt Égyptienne (1812) =

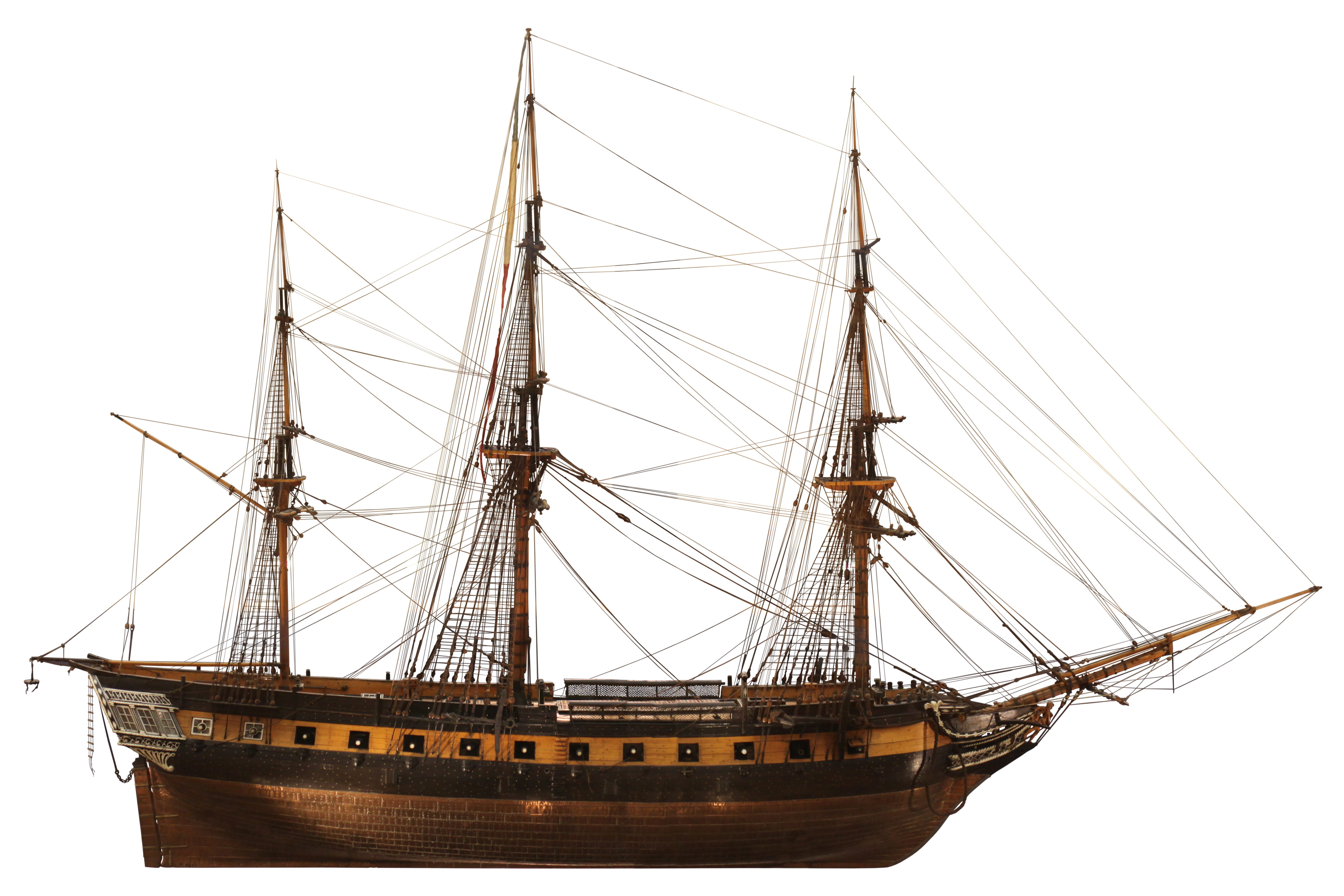
- Model of Égyptienne, part of the Trianon model collection

History

France
- Name: Égyptienne
- Namesake: French campaign in Egypt and Syria
- Builder: La Ciotat
- Laid down: March 1811
- Launched: 7 January 1812
- Fate: Broken up in 1826

General characteristics
- Class & type: Licorne-class fluyt
- Tons burthen: 800 tonnes
- Propulsion: Sail
- Armour: Timber

Égyptienne was a Licorne-class fluyt of the French Navy.

== Career ==
Originally named the Égyptienne when built by the First French Empire, the ship was renamed to Normande during the Bourbon Restoration. The name Égyptienne was restored during the Hundred Days. The ship sailed from Basque Roads to Santa Cruz de Tenerife on 17 February 1815, under Lieutenant Charmasson, to retrieve French refugees and bring them back to Lorient.

Renamed Normande again after the second abdication of Napoléon, she was rebuilt in 1816. After the Second Treaty of Paris restored the French colonies lost to Britain, Normande took part in the evacuation of the British soldiers that occupied them: from 25 to 27 November 1816, she ferried troops from Pointe-à-Pitre to Barbados and Trinidad and Tobago, as well as from Fort-Royal de la Martinique to Grenada, under Commander Ducrest de Villeneuve. She then crossed the Atlantic, ferrying passengers from Basse-Terre to Brest.

From 3 January to 3 March 1818, Normande ferried passengers and supplies from Île-d'Aix to Mauritius, as well as to Saint-Denis and to Saint-Paul on Ile Bourbon (now Réunion). She returned to France carrying Marshal Bouvet de Lozier, former governor of Bourbon, as well as passengers from Saint-Paul and from Cape Town. By July, her command had passed to Commander Elie, and she was attached to the China Seas division under Captain Pierre-Henri Philibert.

From 4 March to 21 December 1819, under Commander Botherel de La Bretonnière, Normande ferried passengers, supplies, ammunition and funds from Rochefort to Saint-Louis du Sénégal and to Gorée. She then ferried cattle and supplies from Senegal to Cayenne, Fort-Royal de la Martinique and Basse-Terre. On 8 February 1820, Normande departed Basse-Terre, bound for New York to repatriate refugees from Santo Domingo to France; she arrived at Île d'Aix on 18 April 1820.

On 22 May, Normande departed Brest, under Lieutenant Vergos, with troops and passengers bound for Île Sainte-Marie, arriving on 20 December after calling in Gorée, Teneriffe, Cape Town and Tamatave.

== Fate ==
Égyptienne was decommissioned in Brest in 1825 and was demolished the following year.
