= HMS Pictou =

Two ships of the Royal Navy have borne the name HMS Pictou, named for Pictou, Nova Scotia:

- HMS Pictou (1813) was a 14-gun privateer or letter of marque that the Royal Navy captured in 1813. The USS Constitution captured and burnt her off Barbados in February 1814.
- HMS Pictou (1814) was a 14-gun schooner, previously the American privateer Zebra, which HMS Pyramus captured on 20 April 1813. The Royal Navy purchased her in 1814 and sold her in 1818.

== See also ==
- HMCS Pictou
