= HMS Hannibal (1810) =

Ship of the line of the Royal Navy

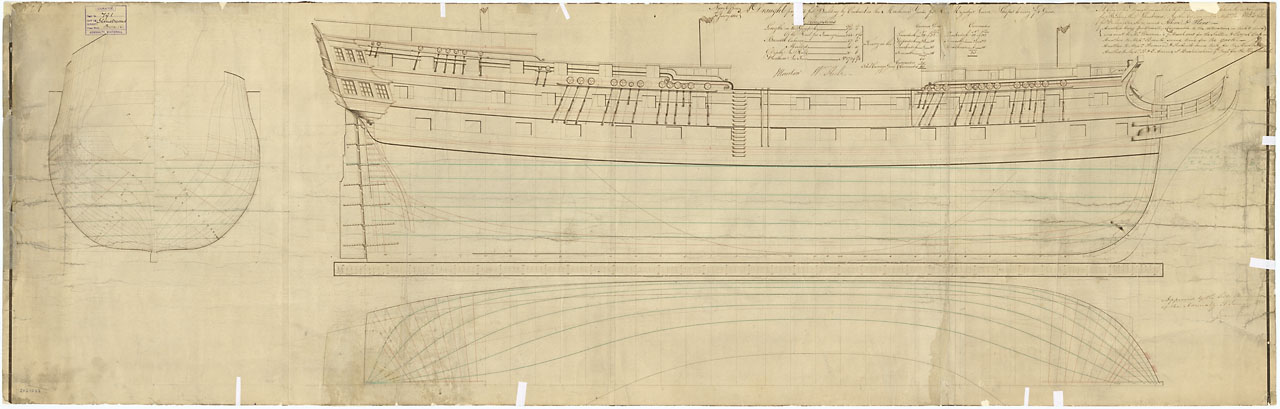
- Hannibal

History

United Kingdom
- Name: HMS Hannibal
- Ordered: 31 January 1805
- Builder: Adams, Bucklers Hard
- Launched: May 1810
- Fate: Broken up, December 1833

General characteristics
- Class & type: Fame-class ship of the line
- Tons burthen: 1749 bm
- Length: 175 ft (53 m) (gundeck)
- Beam: 47 ft 6 in (14.48 m)
- Depth of hold: 20 ft 6 in (6.25 m)
- Propulsion: Sails
- Sail plan: Full-rigged ship
- Armament: 74 guns: Gundeck: 28 × 32 pdrs; Upper gundeck: 28 × 18 pdrs; Quarterdeck: 4 × 12 pdrs, 10 × 32 pdr carronades; Forecastle: 4 × 12 pdrs, 2 × 32 pdr carronades; Poop deck: 6 × 18 pdr carronades

HMS Hannibal was a 74-gun third rate ship of the line of the Royal Navy, built by Adams of Bucklers Hard and launched in May 1810.

Between 1810 and 1811 Hannibal served as flagship to Rear-Admiral Sir Thomas Williams and then Rear-Admiral Philip Durham. On 26 March 1814 Hannibal, Hebrus, and Sparrow encountered the French frigates Sultane and Etoile, which were returning from the Cape Verde Islands and a cruise of commerce raiding. Hannibal set off after Sultane and sent Hebrus and Sparrow after Etoile. Both French vessels were captured the next day. Hannibal captured Sultane without a fight. Hebrus captured Étoile, but only after severe fighting at the ensuing Battle of Jobourg.

She was used for harbour service from August 1825. Hannibal was broken up in December 1833 at Pembroke Dock.
