= Jobourg =

- Part of La Hague
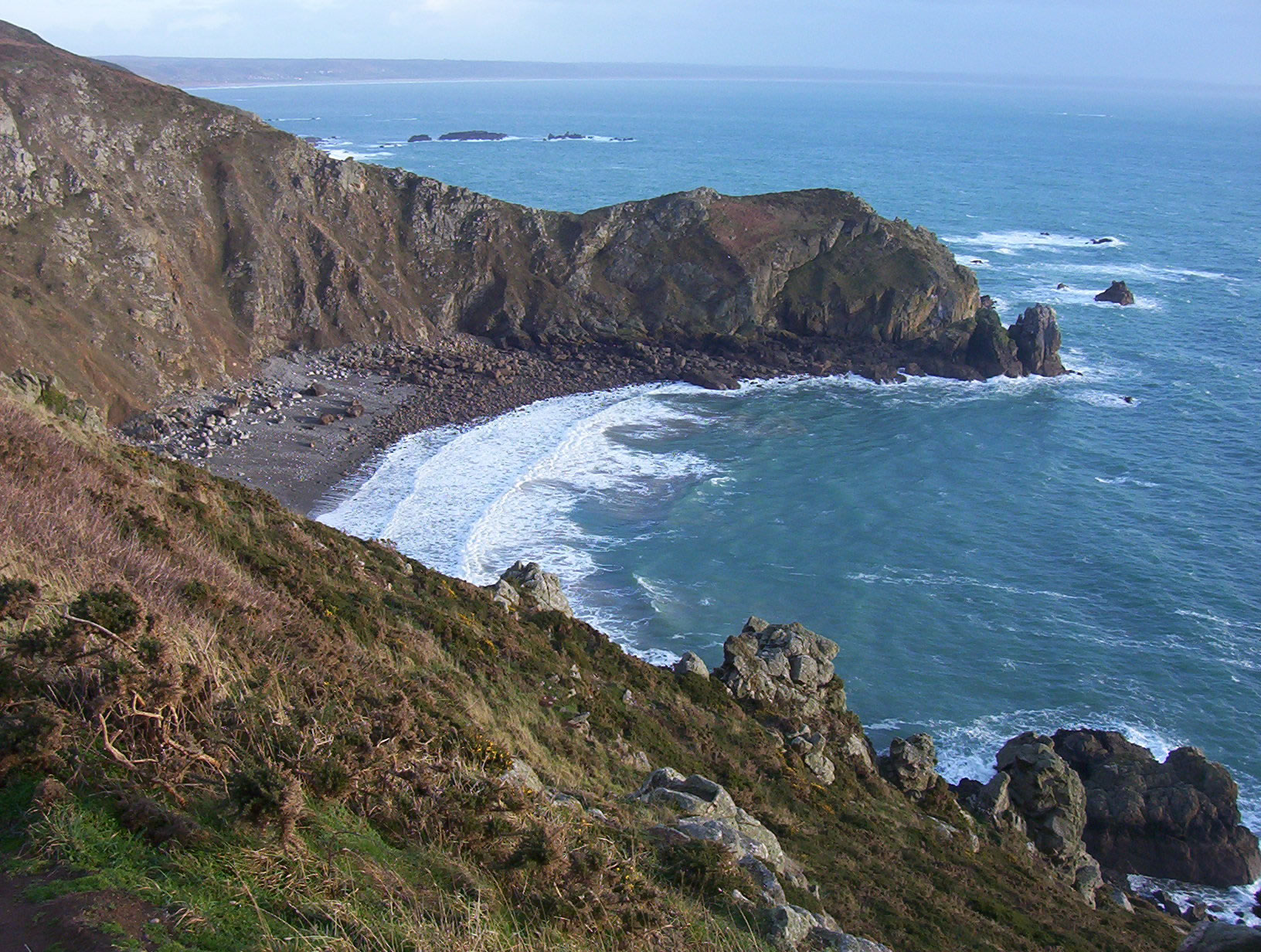
- Location of Jobourg
- Location within France Location within Normandy
- Coordinates: 49°41′N 1°54′W
- Country: France
- Region: Normandy
- Department: Manche
- Arrondissement: Cherbourg
- Canton: La Hague
- Commune: La Hague
- Area^{1}: 10.15 km^{2} (3.92 sq mi)
- Highest elevation: 128 m (420 ft)
- Lowest elevation: 0 m (0 ft)
- Population (2022): 467
  - Density: 46.0/km^{2} (119/sq mi)
- Time zone: UTC+01:00 (CET)
  - Summer (DST): UTC+02:00 (CEST)
- Postal code: 50440
- ^{1} French Land Register data, which excludes lakes, ponds, glaciers > 1 km^{2} (0.386 sq mi or 247 acres) and river estuaries.

Jobourg (French pronunciation: [ʒɔbuʁ]) is a former commune in the Manche department in north-western France. Since 1 January 2017 it has formed part of the new commune La Hague. Jobourg lies near Cap de la Hague on the north-west coast of the Cotentin Peninsula. Its population was 467 in 2022.

== Geography ==
Jobourg is situated at the western end of the La Hague headland, in a landscape of coastal moorland overlooking the English Channel. To the west of the village stands the Nez de Jobourg, a rocky headland whose cliffs rise to about 128 m and are among the highest sea cliffs on the continental European coastline.

The territory of the former commune includes the Baie d'Écalgrain, a bay located between the Nez de Jobourg and the port of Goury. The site combines heather moorland and pasture on the cliffs with a sand-and-shingle beach at their foot, and is crossed by the coastal footpath GR 223.

Off the coast to the north-west, on the rock known as Gros du Raz, stands the Goury Lighthouse (phare de Goury or phare de la Hague), about 48 m high, which marks the Raz Blanchard tidal race and the approaches to the Channel shipping lanes.

Jobourg is also the site of the regional operational centre for surveillance and rescue at sea CROSS Jobourg (formerly CROSSMA Jobourg), located on the heights above the cliffs. From this station, the French maritime authorities monitor navigation and coordinate search-and-rescue operations in the central English Channel.

== History ==
Jobourg remained an independent commune of the Manche department until the territorial reorganisation that created the commune of La Hague on 1 January 2017, when Jobourg and several neighbouring communes were merged.

During the final phase of the Napoleonic Wars, the Battle of Jobourg took place off the coast on the night of 26–27 March 1814. In this naval engagement in the English Channel, the British frigate HMS Hebrus fought the French frigate Étoile close inshore near Jobourg; the action ended with the capture of Étoile and a British victory.

== Population ==
The legal population of Jobourg was 467 inhabitants in 2022, as published by the INSEE.

== Geology ==
Jobourg forms part of the Armorican Massif. Around the Nez de Jobourg and the neighbouring bays, very old metamorphic rocks are exposed in the sea cliffs. These rocks are mainly Icartian gneiss, formed in a Precambrian mountain-building episode around 2 billion years ago and regarded as among the oldest rocks exposed at the surface in France.

The exposures around the Baie d'Écalgrain and the nearby anse du Cul-Rond are used in regional geological teaching and field excursions.

== Culture ==
A well-known local event is the Foire aux moutons de Jobourg (Jobourg sheep fair), also referred to as the Fête des moutons. This agricultural fair and sheep market was created in 1937 by decision of the municipal council and is held each year on the first Saturday of August. The fair showcases the local sheep breed Roussin de la Hague, and typically includes livestock competitions, shearing demonstrations and sheepdog displays in which Border Collies work sheep and sometimes geese, together with a farmers' market and evening music.

== See also ==
- Communes of the Manche department
