= Charles Malcolm =

Royal Navy officer

Vice-Admiral Sir Charles Malcolm
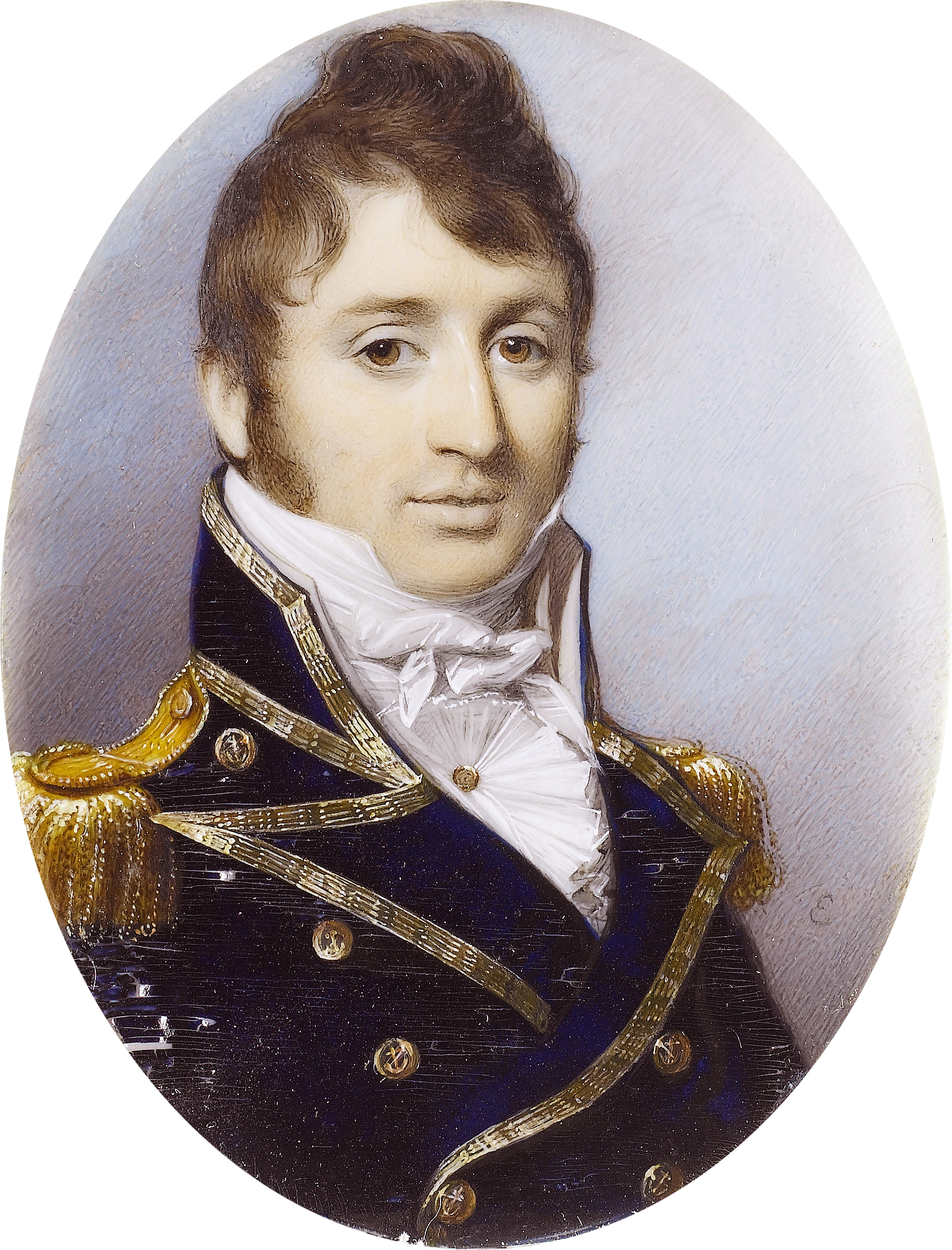
- Portrait by George Engleheart
- Born: 5 September 1782; Burnfoot, Dumfriesshire
- Died: 4 June 1851 (aged 68); Brighton
- Military career
- Allegiance: Great Britain; United Kingdom
- Branch: Royal Navy
- Service years: 1795–1851
- Rank: Vice admiral
- Commands: HMS Albatross; HMS Eurydice; HMS Raisonnable; HMS Narcissus; HMS Rhin; HMS Sibylle

Vice-Admiral Sir Charles Malcolm (5 September 1782 – 4 June 1851) was a Royal Navy officer.

== Naval life ==
He was the tenth son of George Malcolm of Burnfoot, Dumfriesshire, youngest brother of Sir Pulteney Malcolm and Sir John Malcolm, and was born at Burnfoot on 5 September 1782. In 1791, his name was put on the books of the Vengeance, commanded by his uncle, Thomas Pasley, and in 1793 of the Penelope, of which his brother Pulteney was first lieutenant. He entered the Navy in 1795 on board the Fox, then commissioned by his brother, with whom he went out to the East Indies, and whom he followed to the Suffolk. He was promoted by the admiral to be lieutenant on that ship, 12 January 1799, and remained in her till 3 October 1801, when he was appointed acting commander of the Albatross sloop, a promotion which was confirmed by the admiralty to 28 May 1802.

In 1803, Malcolm came home acting captain of the Eurydice, and on his arrival in England found that he had been previously promoted by the admiralty on 29 December 1802. In 1804 he commanded the Raisonnable in the North Sea; and from 1806 to 1809 the Narcissus frigate, actively employed on the coast of France and Portugal; at Porto in 1807 he was able to preserve British property from falling into the hands of the French.

At the beginning of 1809, Malcolm went out to the West Indies, and in April took part in the capture of the Saintes islands. On his return to England he was moved into the Rhin, in which during 1812 and 1813, he was employed in co-operating with the patriots on the north coast of Spain.

In 1813, he went out to the West Indies with convoy; in 1814, he was cruising on the coast of Brazil; and on 18 July 1815, having been joined by the frigates Menelaus and Havannah, sloops Fly and Ferret, and schooner Sealark, he landed a party of seamen and marines at Corrijou (Koréjou, east of Abervrach on the coast of Brittany), stormed the battery, and brought out of the harbour three small armed vessels and a convoy under their protection. The action was the last of its kind during that war.

In September 1817, he fitted out the Sibylle, as flag-captain to Sir Home Popham in the West Indies, from which station he invalided in February 1819. From 1822 to 1827 he commanded one or other of the yachts, William and Mary and Royal Charlotte, in attendance on Richard Wellesley, 1st Marquess Wellesley, lord-lieutenant of Ireland, by whom he was knighted.

In November 1827, he was appointed superintendent of the Bombay Marine, then reorganised and placed under new regulations, which required it to have a captain of the Royal Navy at its head: Malcolm arrived at Bombay in June 1828. On 1 May 1830, its name was officially changed to "the Indian Navy"; it undertook police duties, and ran a school of surveyors. Malcolm held the post for ten years. The establishment of steam navigation in the Red Sea was also largely due to his exertions.

Malcolm was promoted to be rear-admiral on 10 January 1837, and to be vice-admiral on 28 April 1847, but had no further service.

== Later life ==
During his later years he gave attention to the organisation of charitable institutions. He also served on the council of the Royal Geographical Society. He died at Brighton 4 June 1851, and was buried there.

== Family ==
Malcolm was twice married: first, in 1808, to his cousin Magdalene, daughter of Charles Pasley, his mother's brother; and secondly, in 1829, to Elmira Riddell, youngest daughter of Major-general Shaw. He had issue by both marriages.

== See also ==
- O'Byrne, William Richard (1849). "Malcolm, Charles" . A Naval Biographical Dictionary . John Murray – via Wikisource.
