= Frederick Chamier =

English writer (1796–1870)

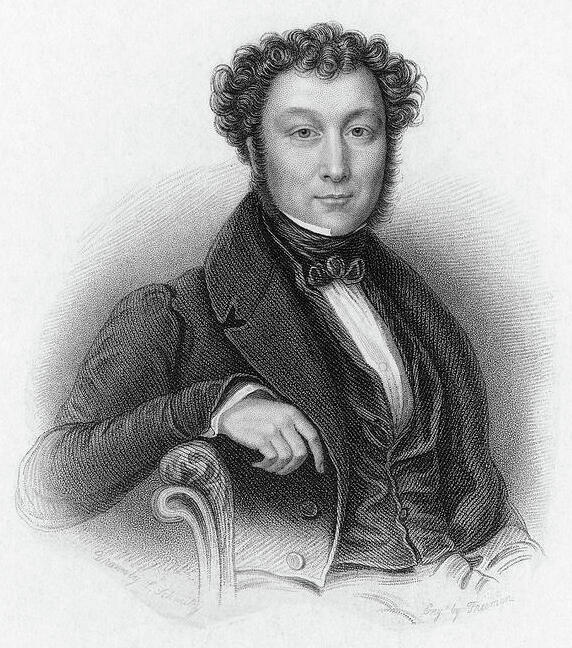
- Chamier in 1838
- Born: 2 November 1796
- Died: 29 October 1870 (aged 73); St Leonards-on-Sea
- Spouse: Bessie Soane (m. 1831–1870)
- Military career
- Allegiance: United Kingdom
- Branch: Royal Navy
- Service years: 1809–1833
- Rank: Captain
- Commands: HMS Britomart
- Conflicts: Napoleonic Wars; Walcheren Campaign; War of 1812; Battle of Caulk's Field
- Other work: Novelist

Captain Frederick Chamier (2 November 1796 – 29 October 1870) was an English novelist, autobiographer and naval captain born in London. He was the author of several nautical novels that remained popular through the 19th century.

== Life ==
Chamier was the son of an Anglo-Indian official, John Ezechial Chamier and his wife Georgiana, daughter of Vice-Admiral Sir William Burnaby. The family home was in Grosvenor Place, London.

He entered the Royal Navy in June 1809, joining the frigate Salsette as a midshipman in time for the Walcheren Campaign.

After the campaign the Salsette was ordered to the Mediterranean and while at Smyrna on 11 April 1810 met with Lord Byron who on hearing the ship was making for Constantinople asked Captain Bathurst for a lift. Byron took a friendly interest in the young Chamier and when the ship stopped en-route at Tenedos within sight of the plains of Troy prevailed on the captain to allow the boy ashore to carry his fowling piece. There Byron sat down on the tomb of Patroclus, and pulled out his copy of Homer and read for his companions. Chamier would become a lifelong devotee, and sprinkle his own books in the future with many Byronic quotations. Later in May 1810, Chamier watched Byron on his famous swim across the Hellespont from Europe to Asia at the second attempt. He described the episode in his autobiography. Once in Constantinople the young midshipman accompanied his captain to various receptions and audiences for Sir Robert Adair with the sultan Mahmud II.

Bathurst was promoted in November 1810 to command the 74-gun Fame and took Chamier with him. Later by April 1811 Chamier went on to serve in the mediterranean on the Arethusa fighting the slave trade. This was followed from October 1811 to 1814 on board the Menelaus under Sir Peter Parker. He was onshore with Parker when the latter was killed at Bellair on 30 August 1814.

On 6 July 1815 he was promoted lieutenant, and continued service in the Mediterranean, the home station, and the West Indies. From 20 September 1824 to 3 August 1825 he was first lieutenant on the Scylla.

He was on the West Indies station until 9 August 1826, when he was put briefly in command of the 10-gun brig Britomart for bringing her home to England in 1827, but thereafter was very soon paid off.

Chamier took no further employment and in 1833 was placed on the retired list of the navy, on which he was formally promoted captain on 1 April 1856.

Effectively retired in 1827, he settled down to the life of an Essex country squire, further dividing his time between his house in Halkin Street, Belgravia, and Paris. His autobiography, The Life of a Sailor, was serialised in The Metropolitan Magazine in 1831–1832).

In 1831 he was engaged in editing the translated transcript of Mikhail Zagoskin's novel Dmitrich Miloslawsky to be issued in England as The Young Muscovite; or, The Poles in Russia, which apparently dated from 1824. The translation had been provided from Moscow by a Russian lady of rank and her two daughters. The book's publication was ceaselessly reported as imminent throughout 1831 and in early 1834. It was intended to publish in three parts, but it was not to appear on London bookshelves until March 1834, and when it did, it was found to have been extensively adapted to acclaim by Chamier.

At the tail end of 1831 Chamier lost a considerable sum in a failed venture the premature establishment of The Metropolitan Magazine, his friend Frederick Marryat would make something of it, later that year. Licking his wounds in Paris he met his future wife Bessie Soane in January 1831. The couple wished to marry but Bessie's guardian Sir John Soane refused permission, despite Chamier, on the face of it, being a man of means; his father had left him a legacy of £10,000 and his writing at that stage was earning him £300 a year. The couple clandestinely eloped to Gretna Green. The couple remarried in Esher that April in an unsuccessful bid to placate the family, to no result, and went off to live in Paris From October 1832 till August 1834. Their only child Elizabeth was born there in the January.

He also wrote nautical novels somewhat in the style of Marryat, including The Unfortunate Man (1835), Ben Brace, the Last of Nelson's Agamemnons (1836), The Arethusa (1837), Jack Adams, the Mutineer (1838), The Spitfire (1840), Tom Bowling (1841), a trilogy Count Konigsmark (1845) and Jack Malcolm's Log (1846). In addition, he continued William James's Naval History and wrote some books of travel.

Chamier invested heavily in the railways. In 1845 alone was a director of several companies, notably the Fampoux and Hazebrouck, the Paris and Lyon, the Cambridge and Lincoln Extension, the ruinous Northampton and Cambridge, and the Rugby and Worcester.

He had been in Paris during the revolution of February 1848, and published an account of that period under the title A Review of the French Revolution of 1848, in which he depicted the main personages taking part in the events.

Chamier held for some time an official post abroad, but retired to Warrior Square, St Leonards-on-Sea, where he died on 29 October 1870 after a lingering illness, survived by his wife. The couple are buried in Hastings Cemetery. He had married in 1832 Elizabeth, daughter of the late John Soane, of Chelsea, and granddaughter of the celebrated Sir John Soane.. His wife, Elizabeth died in 1879. The couple's only child, Eliza Maria Chamier, first married Captain Frederick Crewe, and on his death married Somerset Gough-Calthorpe, 7th Baron Calthorpe.

Frederick Chamier laid claim to being descended from the 17th-century French Huguenot politician Daniel Chamier.

== Family ==
Frederick Chamier I married Elisabeth Soane on 30 April 1832, Esher, Surrrey. Together Chamier and Soane had one child a daughter Eliza Mary Chamier. Eliza Mary Chamier married twice: Frederick Crewe (died: 1858) on 24 January 1854 Naples, who was Captain 17th Regiment of Madras Native Infantry; and Somerset John, 7th Baron Calthorpe (23 January 1831 - 16 November 1912) who she married on 28 January 1862.

Frederick Chamier I was the son of an Anglo-Indian official, John Ezechial Chamier née Deschamps and his wife Georgiana Grace Burnaby, daughter of Vice-Admiral Sir William Burnaby. The family home was in Grosvenor Place, London.

== Reception ==
Chamier's most popular books were:

- Life of a Sailor, reprinted six times between 1832 and 1873
- Ben Brace, reprinted eleven times between 1836 and 1905
- Tom Bowling, reprinted five times between 1858 and 1905
- The Spitfire, reprinted three times between 1840 and 1861

In 1870 The Times described Chamier as "a veteran novelist, one, indeed, whose sea novels some quarter of a century ago were almost as universally popular as those of Captain Marryat." Captain Chamier's works were popular on the Continent; some appeared in two or three translations.
