= Hired armed lugger Sandwich =

Two vessels named His Majesty's hired armed lugger Sandwich served the British Royal Navy, one during the French Revolutionary Wars, and the other during the Napoleonic Wars.

== First Sandwich ==
This lugger served between 24 December 1798 and 6 November 1801. She was of 17017/94 tons (bm), and was armed with fourteen 12-pounder carronades. At the time of the signing of the peace treaty with France in October 1801, her commander was Lieutenant W.R. Wallace.

== Second Sandwich ==
Sandwich served under two contracts. The first contract ran between 16 June 1804 and 10 August 1804. The second contract ran between 6 May 1808 and 6 May 1815. She was of 16659/94 tons (bm), and was armed with twelve 12-pounder carronades.

Before the first of these contracts, and then between them, a lugger Sandwich of 165 tons (bm) received three letters of marque. The first letter, dated 7 June 1803, gave the name of her master as John Bateman, Jnr.; it described her as having a crew of 50 men and being armed with fourteen 12-pounder carriage guns. The second letter, dated 3 November 1804, repeats all the details of the first, but gives the size of her complement as 70 men. The third letter, dated 6 May 1806, gives the name of her master as Francis Giffard. This time, her complement was 60 men, and her armament fourteen 6 and 9-pounder guns.

Sandwich, of 16550/94 tons (bm), entered the Guernsey Registry in 1806.

On 11 June 1806 Sandwich came under the command of Lieutenant Martin White.

On 20 October 1808 HMS Brilliant was in company with HMS Pheasant and Sandwich when they discovered the Revenue cutter Active chasing a French privateer. The British were able to capture their quarry, which turned out to be the lugger Point du Jour, of Roscow (Roscoff). She was armed with three guns and carried a crew of 30 men. Captain Thomas Smyth reported that she "has cruized successfully against our Trade."

On 30 December Sandwich was under the command of Lieutenant Atkins when she encountered a French privateer lugger off the Île de Batz. In the two-hour engagement the privateer repeatedly tried to board Sandwich, but eventually gave up and sailed off. Sandwich had one man killed and seven wounded (two dangerously); Atkins was among the wounded. She then went into Guernsey to refit. The French privateer was Embuscade, under the command of Antoine-Joseph Preira (aka Balidar). She suffered 15 men killed and 22 seriously wounded.

On 5 March 1810 Lieutenant William Edmund Drake assumed command of Sandwich on the Jersey station.

On 17 October 1810, HMS Revenge captured the French privateer Vengeur, a lugger from Dieppe with 78 men and 16 guns, off Cherbourg. Next, on 6 November, HMS Donegal captured the privateer Surcouf, a lugger from Saint-Valéry with 56 men and 14 guns. Revenge, Donegal, and Sandwich shared in the prize money for Vengeur and Surcouf.

On 8 February 1811, Sandwich recaptured Sedulous, Wheatley, master, and sent her into Portsmouth. Sedulous had been on her way to London from Malta when a French privateer captured her.

On 15 February 1812 Sandwich recaptured North Star. HMS Wolverine was in sight. North Star, of St Mary's, Peterson, master, had been off the Eddystone on 13 February when the French privateer Petit Jean, of Dieppe, had captured her. She had sailed from Roscoff on the 9th and had made no captures before she took North Star. (Petit Jean was a lugger with a complement of 52 men armed with small arms, and 8 guns; HMS Persian would capture her on 28 March, some six weeks later.)

On 28 February Sandwich recaptured Petite Famille.

On 15 June Sandwich was in company with the hired armed cutter Queen Charlotte when Sandwich captured the French privateer Courageux. Courageux, Jean-Baptiste Sauveur, master, was a privateer from Saint-Malo armed with two guns and carried a crew of 24 men. She was four days out of Brehat and had not captured anything.

On 21 July, HMS Sealark captured the 113-tonne French lugger Ville de Caen, of sixteen 4- or 6-pounder guns and 75 men, under Jean-Marie Cochet, in a sanguinary engagement that earned her crew the Naval General Service Medal with clasp "Sealark 21 July 1812". Lieutenant Thomas Warrand, commander of Sealark, reported that Ville de Caen had repulsed the lugger Sandwich some time earlier. Ville de Caen had 15 killed, including her captain, and 16 wounded. (Note: For more on Thomas Warrand see: O'Byrne, William R. (1849). "Warrand, Thomas" . A Naval Biographical Dictionary. London: John Murray.)

Sandwich was based in Guernsey. On 6 May 1813 she recaptured Diane. Later that year Sandwich captured a number of other merchant vessels: Marie Charlotte (29 May), Jeune Victoire (9 June), Adelle (17 July), and Lydia (18 September). Lydia was apparently a privateer and one of the prize money notices for her referenced the "peculiar circumstances attending her capture". (Note: A first-class share of the prize money amounted to £6 6s 4d; a fifth-class share, that of an able seaman, was worth 5s 0½d.)

On 1 January 1814 Sandwich arrived at Falmouth. On 27 December 1813, off the coast of France, she had repulsed an attack by two well-armed and well-manned French naval luggers. In March Drake left Sandwich.

On 24 March Sandwich, under the command of Lieutenant Henry Jewry, captured the French sloop Isabella. (Note: A first-class share of the prize money was worth £74 11s 4d; a sixth-class share was worth £3 19s 10½d.)

=== Merchantman ===
Although by some records Sandwich was still under contract to the Royal Navy in 1814, by another source she had returned to mercantile service. She was re-registered in Guernsey in January 1814 with John Fraser, master. On 11 June 1814, she was at Falmouth on a voyage from Guernsey to Havana.

In 1815, Sandwich underwent repairs. In 1816, she was re-registered with a burthen of 16738/94, still under the command of John Fraser. She was reportedly in the Guernsey–Havana trade.

=== Fate ===
In 1819, Sandwich, Fraser, master, was wrecked on the Florida Reef. She was on a voyage from Havana to Guernsey. A small part of the cargo was saved.
