= French frigate Rhin =

Virgine-class frigate of the French Navy

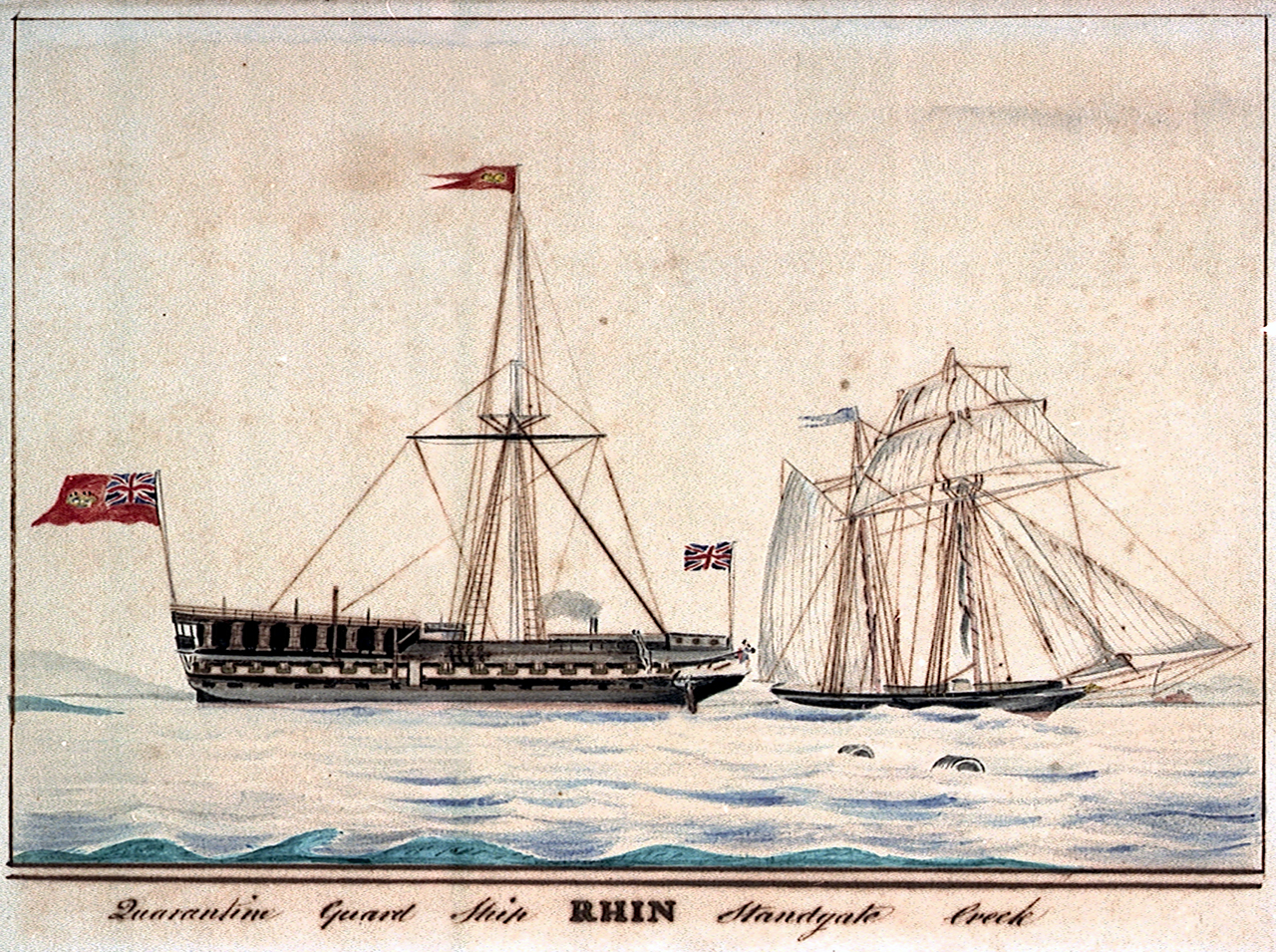
- 19th-century illustration of Rhin as a hospital ship off Sheerness

History

France
- Name: Rhin
- Builder: Toulon
- Laid down: June 1801
- Launched: 15 April 1802
- Completed: October 1802
- Captured: 27 July 1806

United Kingdom
- Name: Rhin
- Acquired: 27 July 1806
- Commissioned: June 1809
- Fate: Sold 26 May 1884

General characteristics
- Class & type: Virginie-class frigate
- Displacement: 1,390 tonneaux
- Tons burthen: 720 port tonneaux; 1079 62/94 (bm)
- Length: 47.4 m (156 ft)
- Beam: 11.9 m (39 ft)
- Draught: 5.5 m (18 ft)
- Complement: French service: 318; British service: 284 (later 315)
- Armament: French service: 40 guns (18-pounders on the main deck); British service: 46 guns including carronades; Upper deck: 28 × 18-pounder guns; Quarterdeck: 14 × 32-pounder carronades; Forecastle: 2 × 9-pounder guns + 2 × 32-pounder carronades

Rhin was a 40-gun Virginie-class frigate of the French Navy launched in 1802. She was present at two major battles while in French service. The Royal Navy captured her in 1806, and Rhin served in the British navy until 1815 capturing numerous vessels. After the end of the Napoleonic Wars she was laid up and then served as a hospital ship for many years. Rhin was finally broken up in 1884.

== French service ==
Rhin took part in the Battle of Cape Finisterre and in the Battle of Trafalgar.

HMS Mars captured Rhin on 28 July 1806, after a chase of 26 hours and 150 miles. Her commander, M. Chesneau, struck just before Mars was about to fire her first broadside. Surinam was present or in sight at the capture of Rhin.

Rhin arrived at Plymouth on 8 August. She was repaired and fitted there from March through August 1809. The Royal Navy commissioned her in June 1809 as HMS Rhin under Captain Frederick Aylmer for the Channel. Captain Charles Malcolm replaced Aylmer in July 1809, and would remain her captain until Rhin paid off in 1815.

== British service: Napoleonic Wars ==
On 16 November 1809, Rhin was in company with Pheasant when Pheasant recaptured the brig Trust.

On 22 March 1810 Rhin captured the French privateer Navarrois. Navarrois was four days out of Bayonne, was armed with 16 guns and carried a crew of 132 men.

On 27 September Wolverine had been in pursuit of a French brig when Rhin joined the chase and after two and a half hours captured the quarry off the Lizard. The French vessel was the privateer San Joseph, of Saint Malo, under the command of a Joseph Wittevronghel, a Dane. San Joseph was one year old, about 100 tons burthen (bm), and armed with 14 guns though she was pierced for 16. She had only been out one day when the British captured her and had taken nothing. Little Belt had been in company with Wolverine at the time.

On 9 October Rhin captured the French privateer brig Comtesse de Montalivet, of Saint Malo. The capture followed a chase of two and a half hours and only ended when the brig lost her maintop-mast. Comtesse de Montalivet was pierced for 16 guns but only mounted 14. She had a crew of 57 men but only 40 were on board as 17 were in prize crews. She was a new vessel on her first cruise and had taken two prizes, one a Portuguese ship and the other an American brig.

On 14 October Rhin recaptured the ship Fama. Fama, which had been sailing from Lisbon to London when she was captured, arrived in Plymouth on 18 October.

On 2 February 1811 Rhin captured the French privateer brig Brocanteur.

On 5 April Rhin captured the schooner Bonne Jeanette. Six days later Rhin captured the American ship Projector. Almost two months later, on 27 May, Rhin was in company with the Princess Charlotte when they captured the American ship Fox. Then on 12 December Rhin captured the French chasse maree Dorade.

On 27 March 1812 Rhin captured the American brig Eclipse. Eclipse. off 300 tons, was armed with six guns and had a crew of 28 men. She had been sailing from Baltimore to Bordeaux when Rhin captured her, and arrived at Plymouth on 2 April.

On 21 June Rhin and Medusa supported an attack by Spanish guerrillas on French forces Lequitio and the nearby island of San Nicholas. Venerable landed a gun whose fire enabled the guerrillas to capture the fort above the town. Medusa and Rhin landed a carronade each to support their marines and those from Surveillante, who captured the island. Although the guerrillas suffered losses, British casualties were nil. On 24 June, landing parties from Rhin and Medusa destroyed fortified works at Plencia.

On 8 November Rhin was in company with the sloop Helicon when they captured the French privateer Courageuse. The capture took place off the Eddystone after a four-hour chase during which the privateer schooner threw overboard her 14 guns, her anchors and part of her provisions. Courageuse was of 90 tons and carried a crew of 70 men.

== British service: War of 1812 ==
On 5 January 1813 Rhin, Colossus and the brig Goldfinch captured the American ship Dolphin. A little over a month later, on 11 February, Rhin and Colossus captured the American ship Print.

On 24 February 1814, Rhin recaptured the Robert. (Note: A first-class share of the prize money was worth £33 10s 9 1/2d; a sixth-class share, that of an ordinary seaman, was worth 5s 6d.) Then on 11 March Rhin captured the American letter of marque brig Rattlesnake.

A satisfying capture occurred on 5 June when Rhin sighted and gave chase to an American privateer schooner. After an eleven-hour chase Rhin captured Decatur in the Mona Passage about four leagues (19 km) from Cape Engaño. Her captain was Dominique Diron, who had also commanded Decatur when she had captured the schooner HMS Dominica in 1813. Decatur had sailed from Charleston on 30 March and had made no captures.

On 27 June 1815 Rhin captured French transport No. 749, Leon, and Marie Joseph. Then on 19 July, Rhin was in company with Havannah, Sealark, Menelaus, Ferret and Fly when they captured the French vessels Fortune, Papillon, Marie Graty, Marie Victorine, Cannoniere, and Printemis. (Note: A first-class share of the prize money was worth £55 18s 4 1/2d; a sixth-class share was worth 10s 10 3/4d.) The attack took place at Corrijou (Koréjou, east of Abervrach on the coast of Brittany), and during the action Ferret was able to prevent the escape of a French man-of-war brig that she force ashore. Apparently, this cutting out expedition was the last of the war.

== Later career ==
Rhin underwent a large repair at Sheerness between May 1817 and August 1820. She was then laid up (roofed over). In 1822 Rhin was among the many vessels that had served on the north coast of Spain and the coast of France in the years 1812, 1813 and 1814 that received their respective proportions of the sum reserved to answer disputed claims from the Parliamentary grant for services during those years. From May to October 1838 she was fitted at Chatham as a floating lazaretto for Sheerness.

== Fate ==
The Admiralty lent Rhin to the Sub-committee for the Inspection of Shipping on the Thames as a smallpox hospital ship on 9 September 1871. She was sold to Charlton & Sons, Charlton on 26 May 1884 for £1,250.
