= HMS Sealark (1811) =

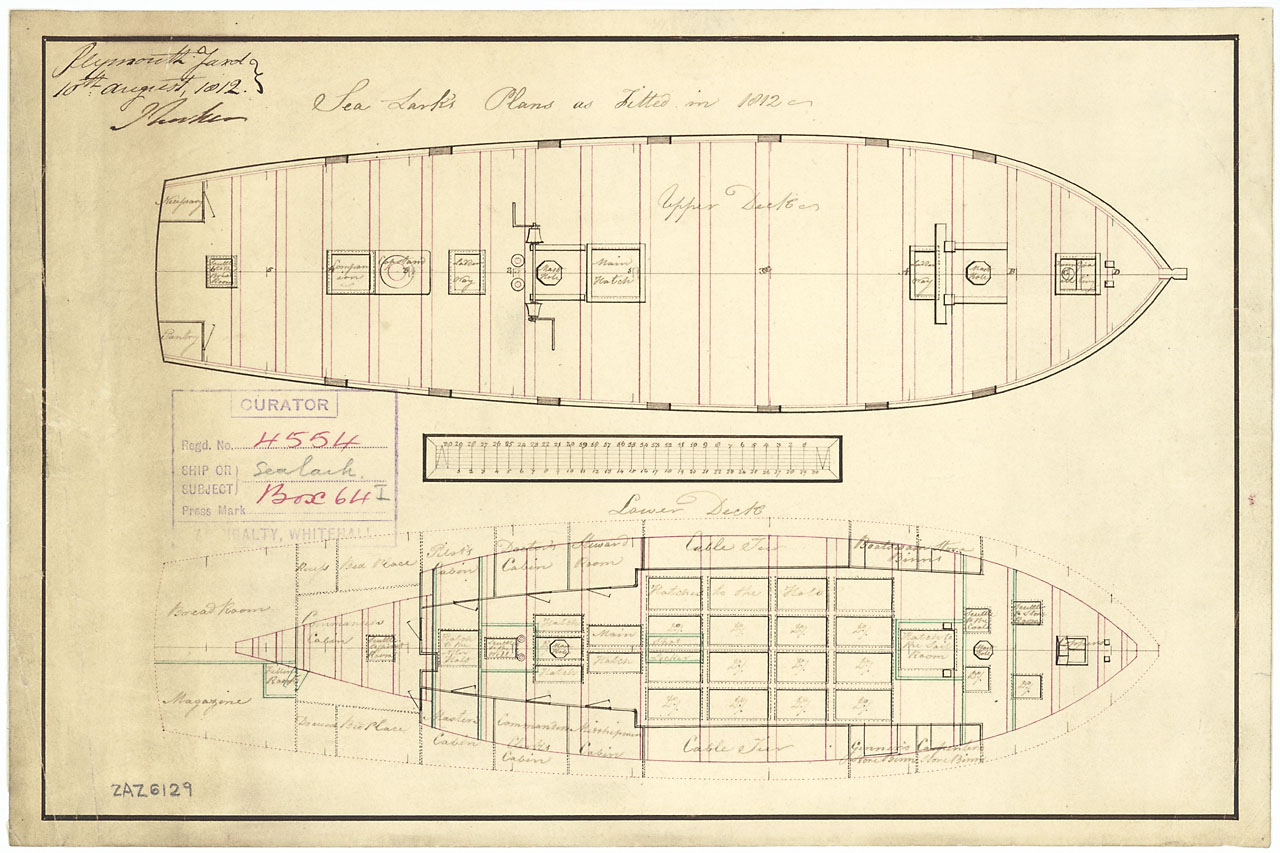
- Plans for HMS Sealark, National Maritime Museum, Greenwich, London

History

United Kingdom
- Name: HMS Sealark
- Launched: 1811
- Acquired: By capture 1811
- Honours and awards: Naval General Service Medal (NGSM) with clasp "Sealark 21 July 1812"
- Fate: Sold 1820

General characteristics
- Type: 10-gun schooner
- Tons burthen: 178 (bm)
- Length: 79 ft 6 in (24.2 m) (overall); 68 ft 0 7/8 in (20.7 m) (keel)
- Beam: 22 ft 8 in (6.9 m)
- Depth of hold: 9 ft 10 in (3.0 m)
- Complement: 50
- Armament: 10 × 12-pounder carronades

HMS Sealark (or Sea Lark) was the American schooner Fly, launched in 1801 or 1811, that HMS Scylla captured in 1811. The Royal Navy took her into service as a 10-gun schooner. She participated in one notable single-ship action in 1812 that in 1847 the Admiralty recognized with a clasp to the Naval General Service Medal. She was sold in 1820.

== Origins and capture ==
Most sources give Fly's launch year as 1811, but not all. On 29 December 1811 Scyllla captured Fly. There being an HMS Fly in service, and the navy having lost its last HMS Sealark in 1809, Fly became HMS Sealark.

== Royal Navy service ==
Lieutenant Thomas Warrand commissioned Sealark in May 1812 for the Lisbon station. (Note: For more on Thomas Warrand see: O'Byrne, William R. (1849). "Warrand, Thomas" . A Naval Biographical Dictionary. London: John Murray.)

Scylla and Sealark were in company on 9 June when they recaptured the San Antonio y Animas. (Note: A first-class share of the prize money was worth £44 9ss 6d; a sixth-class share, that of an ordinary seamen, was worth £1 5s 6d.)

Sealark's most tumultuous moment came on 21 July 1812. That morning, alerted by a shore signal of the presence of an enemy vessel, Warrand set out and within an hour discovered a large lugger flying English colours but chasing and firing at two West Indiamen sailing up the Channel. Sealark caught up with the lugger and eventually an intense engagement ensued that lasted for an hour and a half before a boarding party from Sealark captured the enemy vessel. She was the Ville de Caen, of sixteen guns and 75 men. Lloyd's List reported that Ville de Caen carried eight 12-pounder and four other guns. She belonged to Saint Malo but was just a day out of the Isle de Bas and had taken nothing; she was the same vessel that had fended off the lugger Sandwich at some earlier date.

The engagement was sanguinary. Sealark had seven men killed, and 21 wounded, including Warrand. Ville de Caen had 15 men killed, including her captain, M. Cocket, and 16 wounded. Lloyd's List reported the casualties as 13 killed and 16 wounded on Ville de Caen, and six killed and 18 wounded on Sealark. Sealark took Ville de Caen into Plymouth. (Note: French sources describe Ville de Caen as a 113 ton lugger built at Saint Malo circa 1811. She was pierced for 18 guns but carried sixteen 4 or 6-pounders and a complement of 33–75 men. She had been commissioned in March 1812 under Jean-Marie Crochet, who was killed in the action, which took place off Start Point.)

Lloyd's Patriotic Fund awarded Warrand an honour sword worth 50 guineas. In 1847 the Admiralty authorized the award of the Naval General Service Medal with clasp "Sealark 21 July 1812" to the four still surviving claimants from the action.

At the outbreak of the War of 1812, the Royal Navy seized a number of American ships that happened to be in British ports. Sealark was one of the 27 vessels that shared in the prize money from the detention of the Asia on 5 August. (Note: A first-class share of the prize money was worth £9 10s 10d; a sixth-class share was worth 2s 6d.)

On 2 April 1813, Sealark captured the American ship Good Friends. At the time, Andromache was in company. The privateer Cerberus was in sight. (Note: Captain John Tregowith received a letter of marque on 13 January 1813 for the brig Cerberus, of 294 tons (bm), ten 9&4-pounder guns and six 18-pounder carronades, and 48 men.)

On 23 November Scylla recaptured the ship Harmony. Sealark and the cutter Surly were in sight.

Lieutenant Philip Helpman replaced Warrand in August 1814.

Then on 19 July 1815, Sealark was in company with Havannah, Rhin, Menelaus, Ferret and Fly when they captured the French vessels Fortune, Papillon, Marie Graty, Marie Victorine, Cannoniere, and Printemis. (Note: A first-class share of the prize money was worth £55 18s 4½d; a sixth-class share was worth 10s 10¾d.) The attack took place at Corrijou (Koréjou, east of Abervrach on the coast of Brittany), and during the action Ferret was able to prevent the escape of a French man-of-war brig that she forced ashore. Apparently, this cutting out expedition was the last of the war.

== Fate ==
Sealark was paid off in January 1819. The Admiralty offered her for sale at Plymouth on 8 March 1819. She was sold on 13 January 1820.

== Replica ==
A replica of the ship was built at Tobacco Dock in London as part of a 1980s redevelopment, however it is now closed to tourists and in poor condition.
