= HMS Scylla (1809) =

Brig-sloop of the Royal Navy

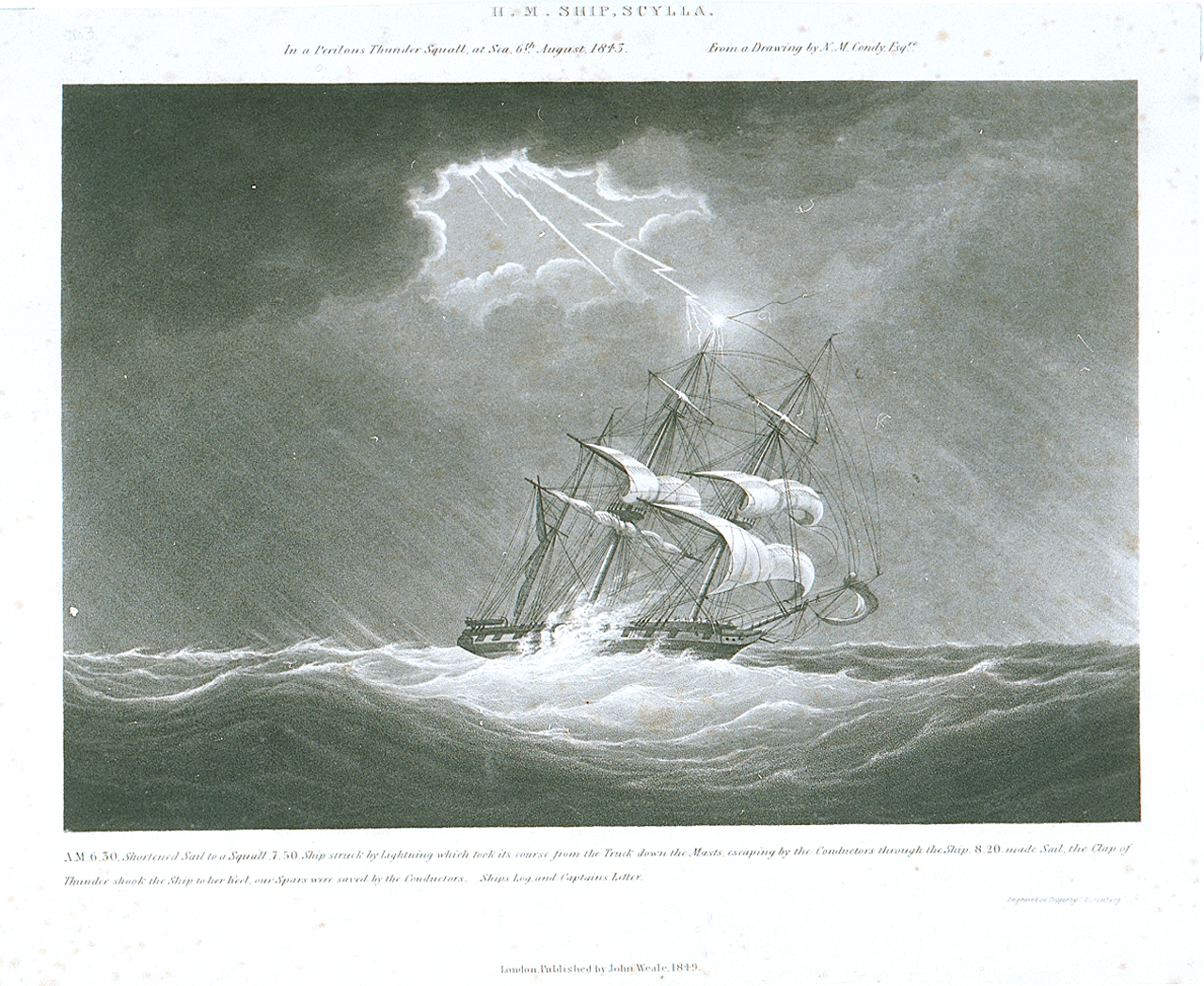
- HMS Scylla in a perilous thunder squall at sea on 6 August 1843

History

United Kingdom
- Name: HMS Scylla
- Ordered: 5 September 1808
- Builder: Robert Davy, Topsham
- Laid down: December 1808
- Launched: 29 June 1809
- Completed: By 9 December 1809
- Fate: Broken up in January 1846

General characteristics
- Class & type: Cruizer-class brig-sloop
- Tons burthen: 385 (bm)
- Length: 100 ft 4 in (30.6 m) o/a; 77 ft 8 1/8 in (23.7 m) (keel)
- Beam: 30 ft 6 1/2 in (9.3 m)
- Depth of hold: 12 ft 10 in (3.9 m)
- Sail plan: Brig
- Complement: 121
- Armament: 16 × 32-pounder carronades + 2 × 6-pounder bow chasers

HMS Scylla was an 18-gun Cruizer-class brig-sloop of the Royal Navy. The first to bear the name Scylla, she was launched in 1809 and broken up in 1846.

== Napoleonic Wars ==
Commander Arthur Atchison commissioned Scylla in September 1809. On the morning of 8 May 1811, Scylla was off the Isle of Bas when she observed a convoy of five vessels under the escort of a naval brig. After a chase of two hours, Scylla caught up with the convoy and opened fire. Being close to shore and with prospects of running on shore to evade capture, the brig resisted strongly. Finding himself among Les Triagos and Pontgalo rocks, and fearing that the French would be able to beach themselves, Atchison ran Scylla into the brig while travelling at eight knots. Within two minutes the British had captured the brig.

The brig was the Cannonière, of ten 4-pounder guns, one 24-pounder carronade, and four swivel guns, and 77 men under the command of enseigne de vaiseau Jean Joseph Benoit Schilds. In the engagement the French lost Schilds and five of his men killed, and 11 men wounded; British casualties were two killed and two wounded. The convoy was two hours out of Perros, sailing towards Brest. Scylla also captured one vessel of the convoy, a sloop with a cargo of wheat. The other four vessels had gotten within the rocks and run themselves on shore. Wind and sea conditions were such that Atchison decided not to attempt to seize them.

Then on 4 June Scylla recaptured the Wellington, and on 29 December captured the American schooner Fly. The Royal Navy took Fly into service as HMS Sealark.

Scylla and Unicorn captured the American ship Manlius on 21 January 1812. Similarly, Scylla and Semiramis were in company at the capture of the Jenny on 1 May. Pheasant shared in the capture.

In August 1812 Commander Colin Macdonald replaced Atchison.

Scylla shared in the capture on 22 March 1813 of the American schooner Tyger with Medusa, Whiting, and Iris. Tyger, of 263 tons (bm), was armed with four guns and had a crew of 25 men. She was sailing from Bordeaux to New York with a cargo of brandy, wine, and silks.

One month later, on 23 April Scylla was in company with Whiting and Pheasant. After a chase of over 100 miles, they captured the American 8-gun brig Fox, which threw two of her guns overboard during the chase. Fox and her 29-man crew was underway from Bordeaux to Philadelphia.

Scylla and Sealark were in company on 9 June when they recaptured the San Antonio y Animas. (Note: A first-class share, i.e., Macdonald's, of the prize money was worth £44 9s 6d; a sixth-class share, that of an ordinary seamen, was worth £1 5s 6d.) Sealark was the former schooner Fly that Scylla had captured in 1811.

On 30 September the French frigate Weser, under the command of captaine de vaisseau Cantzlaat, Chevalier de L'ordre Imperiale de la Reunion, sailed from the Texel for the North Sea. There she captured two Swedish ships before a gale on the 16th took away her main and mizzen mast. Two days later Scylla encountered her 60 leagues west of Ushant, making her way towards Brest under jury main and mizzen masts. Rather than engage her and risk being crippled and so unable to follow her given the weather, Macdonald decided to follow her.

Fortuitously, on 20 October, Royalist, Commander J.J. Gordon Bremer, captain, arrived and Macdonald and Bremer decided to attack Weser. They engaged her for about an hour and a half before they had to withdraw to repair their rigging. At about this time a third British vessel, the 74-gun third rate, Rippon, Captain Christopher Cole, came up. Bremer joined Cole and informed him of the situation while Scylla remained with Weser.

The next morning, as Rippon and Royalist sailed towards Scylla to renew their attack, Weser sailed towards Rippon and struck, after first firing two broadsides towards Scylla. Scylla suffered only two men wounded in the entire engagement. Royalist suffered more heavily, having two men killed and nine wounded. Weser lost four men killed and 15 wounded.

Rippon took Weser's crew on board as prisoners and towed her into port. The Royal Navy took her into service as HMS Weser. (Note: A first-class share was worth £190 1s 3¾d; a sixth-class share was worth £1 11s 3d.)

On 23 November Scylla recaptured the ship Harmony. Sealark and the cutter Surly were in sight. Macdonald received promotion to post captain on 7 June 1814. In June 1814, i.e., after Macdonald's promotion, Commander George B. Allen took command of Scylla.

== Post-war ==
Scylla was driven ashore at Liverpool, Lancashire on 20 March 1815 whilst on a voyage from Liverpool to Cork. She was quickly refloated, but was subsequently paid off later that year.

Scylla then sat in ordinary until 1821 when in February she underwent repairs that lasted until January 1822. She again sat until September 1824 when Commander George Russell recommissioned her for Jamaica, and she underwent conversion to a ship-sloop, a process that took until December. During this period Frederick Chamier was from 20 September 1824 till 3 August 1825 her first lieutenant. (Note: Frederick Chamier was also the author of Ben Brace.)

In March 1826 Commander William Hobson replaced Russell, who had died at Cartagena. At some point Scylla fired a broadside at the Spanish letter of marque Fama, which had fired on Scylla, killing one man. Scylla's broadside silenced Fama, reportedly almost sinking her. When Scylla returned to Britain in mid-1828 to be paid off, the Duke of Clarence, then Lord High Admiral, and Sir Robert Stoppford, then Commander-in-Chief, Portsmouth, visited her. Scylla's condition and discipline impressed his Royal Highness, who promoted Hobson.

In 1828 Commander Stannard Eaton Travers replaced Hobson. (Note: For more on Stannard Eaton Travers see: O'Byrne, William R. (1849). "Eaton Stannard Traver" . A Naval Biographical Dictionary. London: John Murray.) However, her condition was defective and on 23 July 1828 Travers transferred to Rose, which was fitting out for the Halifax station. The next year Scylla underwent repairs again at Portsmouth that lasted from October until May 1830.

Commander John Hindmarsh commissioned her in March 1830 for the Mediterranean. William Henry Smyth used Scylla for hydrographic survey work in the Mediterranean. In September 1831 Hindmarsh was promoted to Captain, having served with Scylla in Alexandria and Malta.

On 3 September 1831, Commander the Honourable George Grey replaced Hindmarsh, still in the Mediterranean. Commander W. Hargood exchanged with Grey, who transferred to the sloop Scout on 10 December 1833, replacing Hargood. Hargood sailed Scylla from Gibraltar, arriving at Spithead on 22 February 1834. She was paid off at Chatham in March 1834.

Commander Edward John Carpenter was appointed to Scylla on 3 December 1834. He remained on her in the West Indies until she was paid off on 10 April 1836. On 29 April 1835, while she was visiting New York from Bermuda, nine seamen deserted. Scylla had brought Sir Sidney Chapman, Lieut.-Governor of Bermuda, and his suite.

On 26 December 1836 Commander the Honourable Joseph Denman commissioned Scylla for the Lisbon Station. He remained in command until 17 November 1839.

Scylla, Cameleon, and Savage shared in the salvage for Jane, an English barque that they rescued after she stranded on the bar of the river at Porto on 7 October 1837. (Note: A second-class share was worth £17 4s 8d; a sixth-class share was worth £1 19s 4½d. A second payment was paid in 1841. A second-class share was worth 13s 9d for each day; a sixth-class share was worth 1s 6d.) On 25 November 1838 Scylla salvaged the cargo on the brig Experiment, of Bristol, after Experiment wrecked. (Note: A first-class share was worth £72 12s 9½d; a sixth-class share was worth £1 16s 6d.)

From September 1841 to April 1842 Scylla underwent repairs and fitting for sea at Plymouth. Commander Robert Sharpe took command on 26 January 1842 and recommissioned her that month for North America and the West Indies.

Sharpe reported that on 6 August 1843 lightning had struck Scylla. He further reported that had she not been fitted with lightning conductors she would have lost her mainmast. It is this storm that was the subject of the drawing above.

== Fate ==
Sharp remained in command of Scylla until she was paid off in 1845. Scylla was broken up at Plymouth in January 1846.
