= HMS Whiting (1812) =

Pilot schooner

History

United States
- Name: Arrow
- Builder: Thomas Kemp
- Launched: 7 December 1811 in Baltimore
- Captured: 8 May 1812

United Kingdom
- Name: HMS Whiting
- In service: 2 January 1813
- Fate: Grounded on Doom Bar on 15 September 1816

General characteristics
- Class & type: Pilot schooner
- Tons burthen: 2255/94 (bm)
- Length: 98 ft (30 m) (overall), 75 ft 8 7/8 in (23.085 m) (keel)
- Beam: 23 ft 7 5/8 in (7.204 m)
- Depth of hold: 9 ft 10 in (3.00 m)
- Propulsion: Sails
- Sail plan: Gaff rig with square topsail on foremast
- Complement: 50
- Armament: 10 × 12-pounder carronades + 2 × 6-pounder guns

HMS Whiting, built in 1811 by Thomas Kemp as a Baltimore pilot schooner, was launched as Arrow. On 8 May 1812 a British navy vessel seized her under Orders in Council, for trading with the French. The Royal Navy re-fitted her and then took her into service under the name HMS Whiting. In 1816, after four years service, Whiting was sent to patrol the Irish Sea for smugglers. She grounded on the Doom Bar. When the tide rose, she became flooded and was deemed impossible to refloat.

== Arrow ==
Built for speed, Arrow served as a cargo vessel trading between the USA and France. This was risky, as in 1807 Britain had introduced restrictions on American trade with France, with which Britain was at war. The U.S. considered these restrictions illegitimate.

On 8 May 1812, six months after being commissioned, Arrow was on a return voyage from Bordeaux to Baltimore fully laden with goods such as brandy, champagne, silk, nuts and toys, when the 38-gun frigate HMS Andromache, commanded by Captain George Tobin, seized Arrow and her cargo. Barely a month later the instruments allowing the seizure were repealed, two days before the United States Congress had voted to declare war on the United Kingdom, which President Madison approved on 18 June 1812.

Tobin sent Arrow to Plymouth as a prize, with six of his seamen and two marines on board, and under escort of HMS Armide, commanded by Captain Lucius Handyman. As her original crew arrived in England before the declaration of war, they were released. Arrow was taken to Plymouth Dockyard where between June 1812 and January 1813 she was re-fitted to be used by the Royal Navy.

== HMS Whiting ==
In full, Whiting's new name was "His Majesty's schooner Whiting", and not "His Majesty's ship". She succeeded the Bermudian-built Ballyhoo schooner, Whiting, which a French privateer had captured outside a US harbour at the start of the American War of 1812. In January 1813 Lieutenant George Hayes RN, took command and on 25 February 1813 she sailed for the Bay of Biscay to join Surveillante, Medusa, Bramble, Iris, Scylla, and Sparrow in the blockade of trade between the U.S. and France.

Whiting was in service with the Royal Navy for almost four years. During that time, while under the command of Hayes, she captured or recaptured several vessels. On 22 March 1813, Whiting shared in the capture of the American schooner Tyger with Medusa, Scylla and Iris. Tyger, of 263 tons (bm), was armed with four guns and had a crew of 25 men. She was sailing from Bordeaux to New York with a cargo of brandy, wine, and silks.

One month later, on 23 April, Whiting was in company with Scylla and Pheasant. After a chase of over 100 miles (90 nmi; 160 km), they captured the American 8-gun brig Fox, which threw two of her guns overboard during the chase. Fox and her 29-man crew was underway from Bordeaux to Philadelphia.

Then on 15 July, Whiting recaptured the ship Friends, in company with Reindeer. Whiting, in company with Helicon, also recaptured the Colin, on 25 October.

Whiting, Eurotas, and Helicon recaptured Betsey, Merryweather, master, on 30 October, and several other prizes to the American privateer True Blooded Yankee, and sent her into Plymouth.

By 26 August 1814, Whiting was under the command of Lieutenant John Little. (Note: Little's previous command had been the hired armed schooner Charles) On that day she recaptured the brig Antelope. (Note: A first-class share of the prize money, i.e., that which accrued to Lieutenant Little, was worth £296 12s 0d; for Little, the amount was probably well in excess of four years' salary. A sixth-class share, that which would accrue to an ordinary seaman, was worth £16 1s 6d. For an ordinary seaman, this amount was almost a year's salary.)

Whiting was also one of ten British vessels that took part in the Battle of Fort Peter, a successful British attack in January 1815 on an American fort. This battle was one of the skirmishes of the War of 1812 that happened after the US and Britain had signed the Treaty of Ghent, but before the US Senate had ratified it.

== Wreck on Doom Bar ==
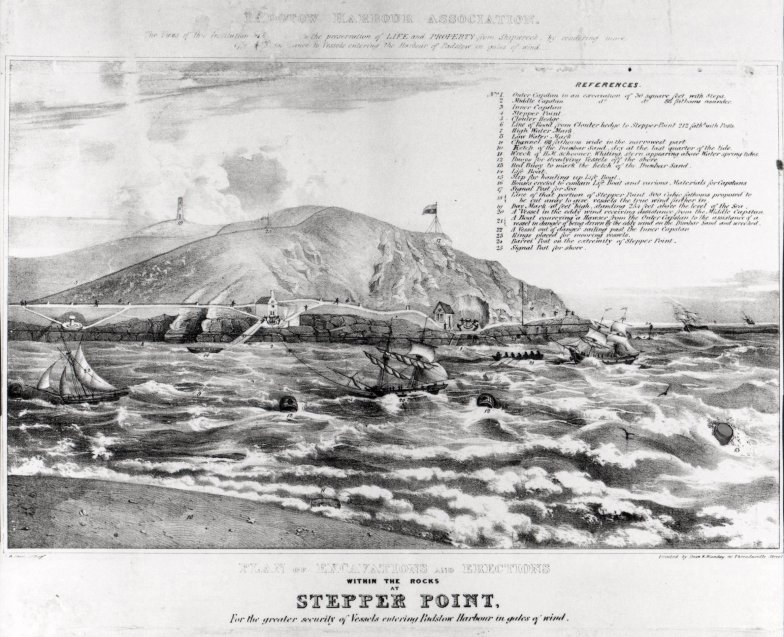
Wreck of the "Whiting" on Doom Bar

On 18 August 1816, Whiting, under the command of Lieutenant John Jackson, was ordered to leave Plymouth and sail around Land's End to the Irish Sea to counter smuggling in the area. On 15 September 1816, to escape a gale, Jackson took his vessel into harbour at Padstow on the north coast of Cornwall. The wind dropped as they came around Stepper Point, and the ship ran aground on the Doom Bar as the tide was ebbing, stranding her.

According to the court-martial transcripts, an attempt to move Whiting was made at the next high tide, but she was taking on water and it became impossible to save her. Her abandonment happened over the next few days. The court martial board reprimanded Lieutenant Jackson for having attempted to enter the harbour without a pilot and for his failure to lighten her before trying to get her off; as punishment he lost one year's seniority. Five crewmen took advantage of the opportunity to desert; three were recaptured and were given "50 lashes with nine tails". Whiting was eventually sold and despite correspondence requesting her move eleven years later, the Navy took no further interest in her.

== Legacy ==
In May 2010, ProMare and the Nautical Archaeology Society, with the help of Padstow Primary School, mounted a search to find Whiting. They conducted a geophysical survey that recorded a number of suitable targets that divers subsequently investigated. One target is located only 27 yards (25 m) from the calculated position of the wreck but sand completely covers the site, preventing further investigation at this time.
