= Betsey (1800 ship) =

History

Great Britain
- Name: Betsey
- Owner: 1800: Hugh Duncan Baillie, James Evan Baillie, Robert Bush, William Elton, John Elton and James Elton, merchants, Bristol; 1818: William Scott, merchant, and William Lund, mariner, Bristol
- Launched: 1800, Bristol
- Captured: 11 August 1813; October 1813
- Fate: Last listed 1825

General characteristics
- Tons burthen: 266, or 26660/94 (bm)
- Length: 94 ft 3 in (28.7 m)
- Beam: 26 ft 3 in (8.0 m)
- Armament: 2 × 4-pounder guns (1815)
- Notes: Two decks and three masts

Betsey was launched at Bristol in 1800, and sailed as a West Indiaman. American vessels captured her twice in 1813 but each time she was recaptured. After the war she continued to sail as a West Indiaman. She was last listed in 1825.

== Career ==
Betsey first appeared in Lloyd's Register (LR), in the volume for 1800.

Year	Master	Owner	Trade	Source & notes
1800	T.J.Deake	R.Baillie	Bristol–Grenada	LR
1801	T.J.Deake; J.Bailly	R.Bailly	Bristol–Grenada	LR
1807	J.Bailey; Scriffin	E.Bailey	Cork–Grenada	LR
1813	W.Scriffin; Merryweather	E.Bailie	Bristol–St Vincent	LR; repairs 1810

Betsey's first captor, on 11 August 1813, was USS Argus. Argus captured Betsey, Merryweather, master, was on her way back from St Vincents to Bristol when Argus captured Betsey some nine leagues west of Scilly. Argus sent Betsey to France, but she was retaken and came into Plymouth. (Note: It is not clear who the re-captor was. It was not HMS Leonidas. The Betsey that Leonidas reaptured was a different Betsey, and the recapture took place in April.)

Betsey's second captor, in October 1813, was the privateer True Blooded Yankee. HMS Whiting, Eurotas, and Helicon recaptured Betsey, Merryweather, master, on 30 October, as well as several other prizes to True Blooded Yankee, and sent her into Plymouth. Betsey had been on her way from Bristol to Grenada when she had been captured some 100 miles from Lundy Island.

Year	Master	Owner	Trade	Source & notes
1815	Merryweather; W.Lund	E.Bailie	Bristol–Grenada	LR; repairs 1810
1818	W.Coffin; W.Lund	W.Scott	Cork; Bristol–Demerara	LR; repairs 1810
1819	E.Simpson; D.Cameron	Campbell	Greenock–Demerara	LR; repairs 1810
1825	D.Cammeron	Campbell	Greenock	LR; repairs 1810

== Fate ==
Betsey was last listed in 1825.
