= HMS Havannah (1811) =

Frigate of the Royal Navy

History

United Kingdom
- Name: HMS Havannah
- Builder: Wilson & Co., Liverpool
- Launched: 1811
- Fate: Training ship 1860; Sold for breaking 1905

General characteristics
- Class & type: Apollo-class frigate
- Tons burthen: 948 64/94 bm (as designed)
- Length: 145 ft 0 1/2 in (44.2 m) (gundeck); 121 ft 9 1/4 in (37.1 m) (keel)
- Beam: 38 ft 3 1/4 in (11.7 m)
- Draught: 13 ft 3 3/4 in (4.1 m)
- Sail plan: Full-rigged ship
- Complement: 264
- Armament: Upper deck: 26 × 18-pounder guns; QD: 2 × 9-pounder guns + 10 × 32-pounder carronades; Fc: 2 × 9-pounder guns + 4 × 32-pounder carronades

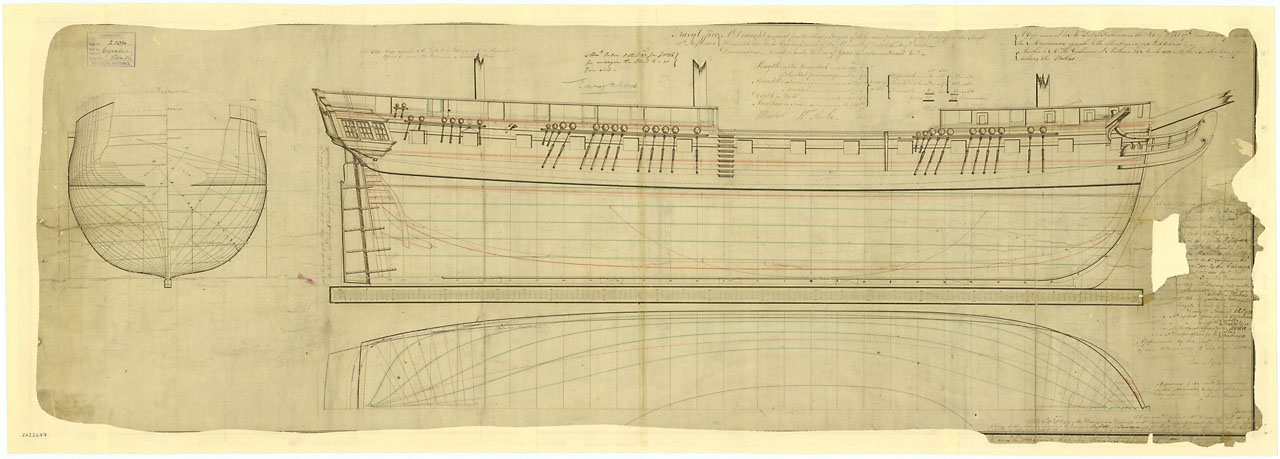
Plan of an Apollo-class frigate dated 1803

HMS Havannah was a Royal Navy 36-gun fifth-rate frigate. She was launched in 1811, and was one of twenty-seven Apollo-class frigates. She was cut down to a 24-gun sixth rate in 1845, converted to a training ship in 1860, and sold for breaking up in 1905.

== War service ==
Havannah's first captain was George Cadogan, who commissioned her into the Channel Fleet. Havannah was rapidly involved in operations against French coastal shipping off the Channel Islands.

On 6 September 1811, the boats of Havannah, under the command of her first lieutenant, William Hamley, landed a party that spiked the three 12-pounder guns of a battery on the south-west side of the Penmarks. They then brought out several coasting vessels that had taken refuge under the guns, all without taking any losses.

- Schooner Aimable Fanny, laden with wine and brandy, and several chasse marees:
- St. Jean, laden with salt;
- Petit Jean Baptiste, laden with wine and brandy;
- Buonaparte, laden with wine and brandy;
- Voltigeur, laden with wine and brandy; and
- lastly, one of unknown name, laden with wine and brandy, dismantled and set on fire but later extinguished.

On 25 December, Havannah sailed for the Mediterranean. In 1812, Cadogan took Havannah to join the squadron operating in the Adriatic from the island of Lissa. On 24 April 1812, Apollo, Eagle, and Havannah landed Lieutenant-colonel George Duncan Robertson, his staff, and a garrison at Port St. George on Lissa. The British had defeated a French naval force on 13 March, at the Battle of Lissa and wanted to establish a base there with Robertson as its first Governor.

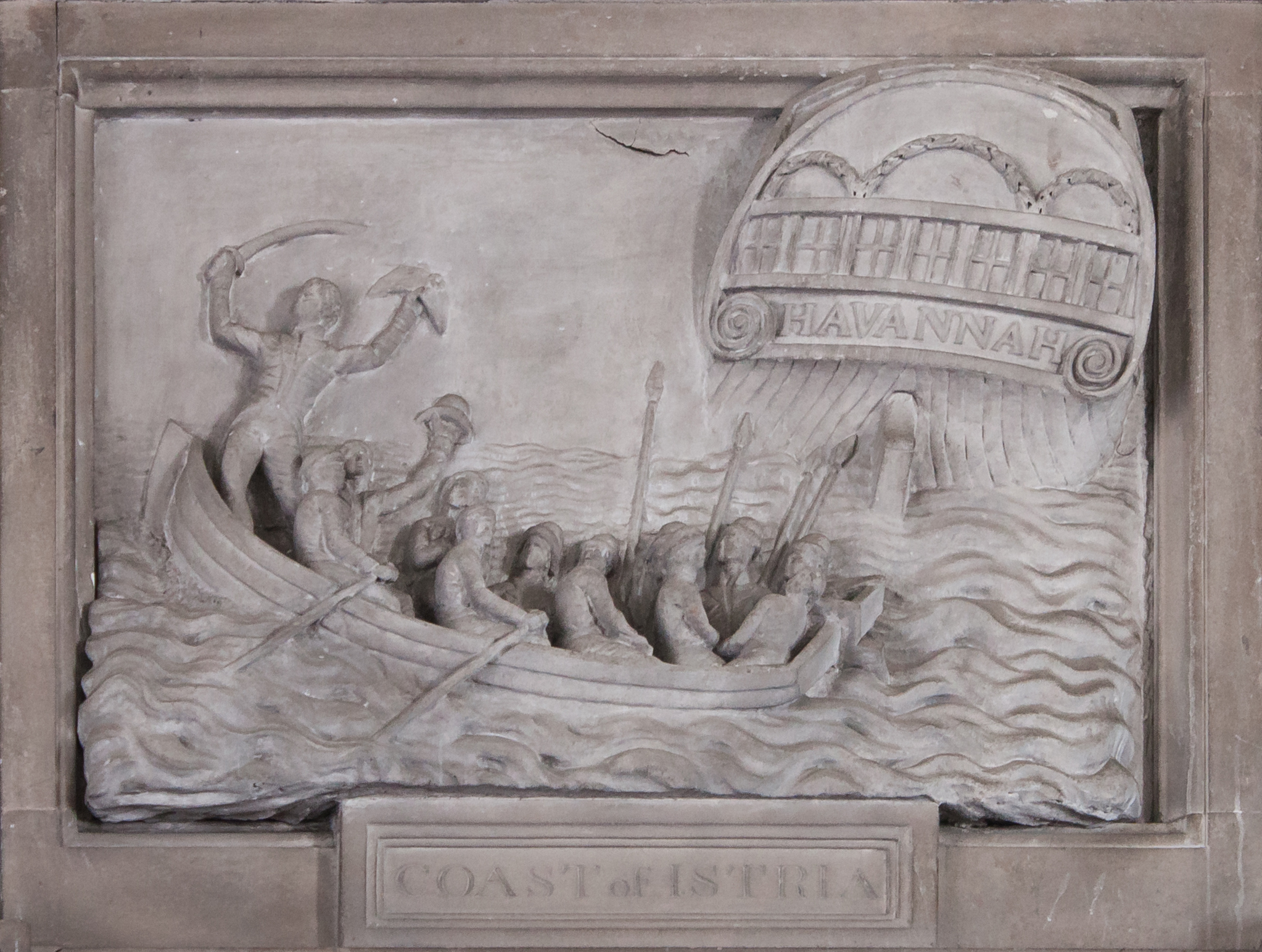
Memorial dedicated to Late Masters Mate Edward Percival who fell during the operation on 6 January 1813

In early 1813, Havannah was detached to the Northern Italian coast where she conducted a five-month campaign against the shipping and shore facilities of Vasto and its environs. On 6 January 1813, Havannah's boats cut out Gunboat No. 8, armed with one long 24-pounder gun. She had a crew of 35 men under the command of M. Joseph Floreus, enseigne de vaisseau. Despite meeting a superior force and coming under small arms fire from the shore, the boats, under Lieutenant Hamley, captured the gunboat and three merchant vessels, their original target, as well. The British had one man killed and two men wounded in the operation. In May 1821, prize money for the gunboat, the three merchant vessels St Antonio No. 1, St Antonio No. 2 and St Antonio No. 3 was awarded, as well as prize money for two other vessels taken that day, Madona del Rosario and the settee Euphemia. On 14 January, Havannah and Milford captured two small trabaccolos.

Three weeks later, on 7 February, Havannah destroyed four gunboats at Manfredonia. In numerous actions, she seized dozens of ships and destroyed coastal batteries. For instance, on 22 March 1813, the ship's boats captured at Vasto one trabaccolo, armed with three 9-pounder guns and destroyed another. Then on 26 March, her boats brought out five armed trabacolos and five feluccas laden with salt that had been run up on the beach near the town of Fortore. In both actions the enemy lost at least one man killed, while the British had only two men wounded in all. In May 1821 prize money for ten trabaccolos, one parenza, five feluccas, and their cargoes, captured between 22 March and 5 May, was paid.

On 18 July, while off Manfredonia, Havannah, with the sloop Partridge, attacked a small convoy and captured or destroyed all the vessels. They captured one Neapolitan gunboat armed with one 18-pounder gun, and burnt another. They also destroyed a pinnace armed with one 6-pounder gun. Lastly, they captured two trabaccolos armed with three guns each and laden with salt, and destroyed two others of the same strength and cargo. (Note: In May 1821 prize money was paid for one trabaccolo and one paranza, laden with salt, captured that day. In 1822, head money was paid for "Gunboats No. 1, 2 and 3".)

In November 1813, Havannah was attached to Thomas Fremantle's squadron that blockaded and besieged Trieste. She was then detached to take the port of Zara with the assistance of Weazel (or Weazle). Cadogan used the ships' guns to establish batteries armed with two 32-pounder carronades, eight 18-pounder guns, and seven long 12-pounder guns. He then attacked the city and captured it with the aid of some Austrian troops. In all, they captured 110 guns and 18 howitzers, 350 men, 100 dismounted guns, and 12 gunboats. Cadogan was later instructed to hand over all prizes and spoils of war to the Austrians. (This order cost the crews of Havannah and Weazle an estimated £300,000 in prize money.) The Emperor of Austria, however, awarded Lieutenant Hamley the Imperial Austrian Order of Leopold for his services at Zara.

On 9 December, Havannah and Weazel destroyed 17 gunboats. (Note: A first-class share of the prize money was worth £197 17s 9 1/2d; a sixth-class share, that of an ordinary seaman, was worth £1 16s 8d.)

In 1814, Havannah came under the command of Captain James Black (acting. On 6 February 1814, Apollo and Havannah were anchored outside Brindisi while the French frigate Uranie was inside the port, on fire. Cerberus had chased her into the port some weeks earlier while awaiting the officials of the port, which belonged to the Kingdom of Naples, to respond to the presence of the French vessel. When Apollo appeared on the scene and made signs of being about to enter the port, Uranie's captain removed the powder from his ship and set her on fire. (Note: A first-class share of the head money for the destruction of the Uranie was worth £159 9s 7 3/4d; a sixth-class share was worth £1 0s 8 1/2d.)

On 15 April 1814, days before the end of the war, Havannah, under the command of (temporary) Captain Edward Sibly, captured the French privateer schooner Grande Isabelle off Corfu, together with the schooner's prize. The schooner carried four guns and 64 men, and had sailed from Corfu on 9 April, before capturing a vessel sailing from Trieste to Messina. (Note: A first-class share of the prize money was worth £75 2s 5d; a sixth-class share, that of an ordinary seaman, was worth 11s 11 3/4d.)

Captain Gawen Hamilton recommissioned Havannah in April 1814, at Portsmouth. On 19 July 1815, Havannah was in company with Sealark, Rhin, Menelaus, Fly and Ferret when they captured the French vessels Fortune, Papillon, Marie Graty, Marie Victorine, Cannoniere, and Printemis. One was a naval brig of 12 guns and one a cutter of ten guns; two were schooners and three were chasse marees. (Note: The naval brig may have been Cannoniere, or more correctly Cannoniere No. 21. Fouache & Reine, of Honfleur, had built her; she was launched on 7 August 1793, as Inquiète, and renamed in March 1803. She was a gun-brig of 170 tons (French) displacement, and had originally been armed with three 24-pounder guns and 12 swivel guns.) (Note: A first-class share of the prize money was worth £55 18s 4 1/2d; a sixth-class share was worth 10s 10 3/4d.)

Havannah also shared in the prize money for the ship Abeona and the schooners Franklin and Saucy Jack, which other ships had captured between 21 October and 6 November, in the Chesapeake. Similarly Havannah shared in the prize money for the schooner Mary and the goods from the transports Lloyd and Abeona, captured in the Chesapeake between 29 November and 19 December. (Note: A first-class share of the prize money was worth £26 15s 10 1/2d; a sixth-class share was worth 6s 1 1/2d.)

== Peacetime service ==
In 1815, Havannah sailed for North America, but by 12 August 1815, she was part of the squadron accompanying Northumberland, which was carrying Napoleon to exile in Saint Helena. In 1816, Havannah sailed to the Cape of Good Hope.

By 1819, Havannah was laid up at Sheerness. She underwent repairs between April 1819 and October 1822. From November 1821, she was again in commission and then was based in the Mediterranean. In 1830, she was in Sheerness again.

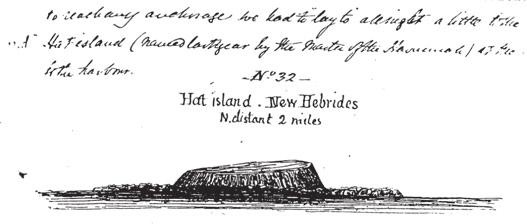
Sketch of Eretoka Island (Hat Island), Vanuatu, drawn by Philip Doyne Vigors, while serving in Havannah

In 1845, she was cut down to a 24-gun sixth rate corvette carrying 32-pounder (40cwt) guns.

In February 1848, Captain J.E. Erskine took command. She then served on the New Zealand Station between August 1848 and mid-1851. In March 1859, the ship was at Geelong. Havannah travelled to the New Hebrides (now Vanuatu) in late 1850, and again as a missionary tour in May 1851. She visited the New Hebridean islands of Aneityum, Tanna, Erromango, Efate, Malakula as well as other islands in the South Pacific Ocean. Havannah Harbour on Efate was named after the ship. A full account of Captain Erskine's captaincy and the ship's movements was given in the Wellington Spectator, reproduced in The Shipping Gazette and Sydney General Trade List on 12 July 1851. Responding to criticism that he had not spent enough time at anchor in Auckland, the writer points out that his visits to Pacific islands "tended to protect British interests, strengthen British influence, and advance civilization throughout these isles of the Pacific, all points of no mean importance to the colonies in these seas, and to the British Empire, of which they form a part". Among the crew (1848-1851) was Francis Hixson.

She returned to Britain via Rio de Janeiro. She arrived at Devonport from Portsmouth on 7 December 1851. While approaching Britain, on 2 December, she rendered assistance to the French ship Celine. Almost two years later her crew received an award of money for their services. (Note: A fifth-class share was worth £13 5s 6d.)

Captain T. Harvey took command in August 1855. Under him, Havannah served with the Pacific Station from 1855 to 1859. On 24 November 1856, she assisted the French corvette Embuscade in rescuing the crew of the American whaler Nauticon, of Nantucket, which was wrecked at Honolulu, Hawaii. Havannah Channel in those waters is named for the ship, Port Harvey for its captain.

== Fate ==
In 1860, Havannah was sent to Cardiff to serve as a "ragged school ship". She was sold for breaking up in 1905.
