= HMS Pheasant (1798) =

Sloop of the Royal Navy

History

Great Britain
- Name: HMS Pheasant
- Builder: Edwards of Shoreham
- Launched: 1798
- Fate: Sold on 11 July 1827

General characteristics
- Class & type: 18-gun sloop
- Tons burthen: 365 bm
- Length: 106 feet (32 m)
- Beam: 30 feet (9.1 m)
- Armament: 18 guns

HMS Pheasant was an 18-gun Merlin class sloop of the Royal Navy.

== French Revolutionary Wars ==
She was built in 1798 for the Royal Navy at a cost of £8,087 (equivalent to £898,500 in 2025).

From 1798 to 1803, she was based in Halifax, Nova Scotia.

On 14 April, 1799, she and HMS Lynx captured the American merchant ship General Washington, claiming US Army arms and military stores on board were "contraband".

== Napoleonic Wars ==
In 1805, she was based at the Leeward Island Station. In 1807, she was involved in the Battle of Montevideo (1807) in the Rio de la Plata. On 6 January 1807, Pheasant was in company with Leda and Leda at the capture of Ann, Denning, master.

In 1808, she was stationed with the Channel Fleet. On 8 May she captured the French privateer vessel Tropard, formerly Flying Fish. Then on 20 October 1808, Pheasant was in company when Brilliant captured and destroyed the French privateer Ponte du Jour.

On 4 November 1809, Pheasant recaptured Traveller. On 16 November 1809, she re-captured the brig Trust, in company with Rhin.

Later on 3 February 1810, she captured the privateer lugger Comte De Hunebourg from St Malo. Pheasant, under the command of Captain John Palmer, lured the privateer close, with the privateer firing the first shot. The two vessels exchanged fire but it took a four-hour chase before Pheasant was able to make the capture. Comte De Hunebourg, of about 80 tons (bm), had been armed with 14 guns, which she threw overboard during the chase, and had a crew of 53 men. She was three days out of Isle of Bas on her second cruise, but had not yet captured anything.

In October, Pheasant recaptured London, of London, which a French privateer had taken. London arrived in Plymouth on 19 October. Pheasant also recaptured Elizabeth, Aiken, master, which had been captured while sailing from Lisbon to Bristol. She arrived in Plymouth on 19 September.

On 17 June 1811, Pheasant captured Héros.

On 1 May 1812, Pheasant, with Semiramis and Scylla, was involved in the detention of the American ship Jenny.

Later in 1812, Pheasant was repaired and refitted in Plymouth at a cost of £11,587 (equivalent to £712,480 in 2025).. As soon as she was seaworthy, she was back in action and on 14 December 1812 captured the American schooner Hope.

On 12 March 1813, Pheasant and Warspite captured the schooner William, a U.S. privateer. On 23 April she was in company with Whiting and Scylla. After a chase of over 100 miles, the British vessels captured the American 8-gun brig Fox, which threw two of her guns overboard during the chase. Fox and her 29-man crew were underway from Bordeaux to Philadelphia.

== Post-war ==
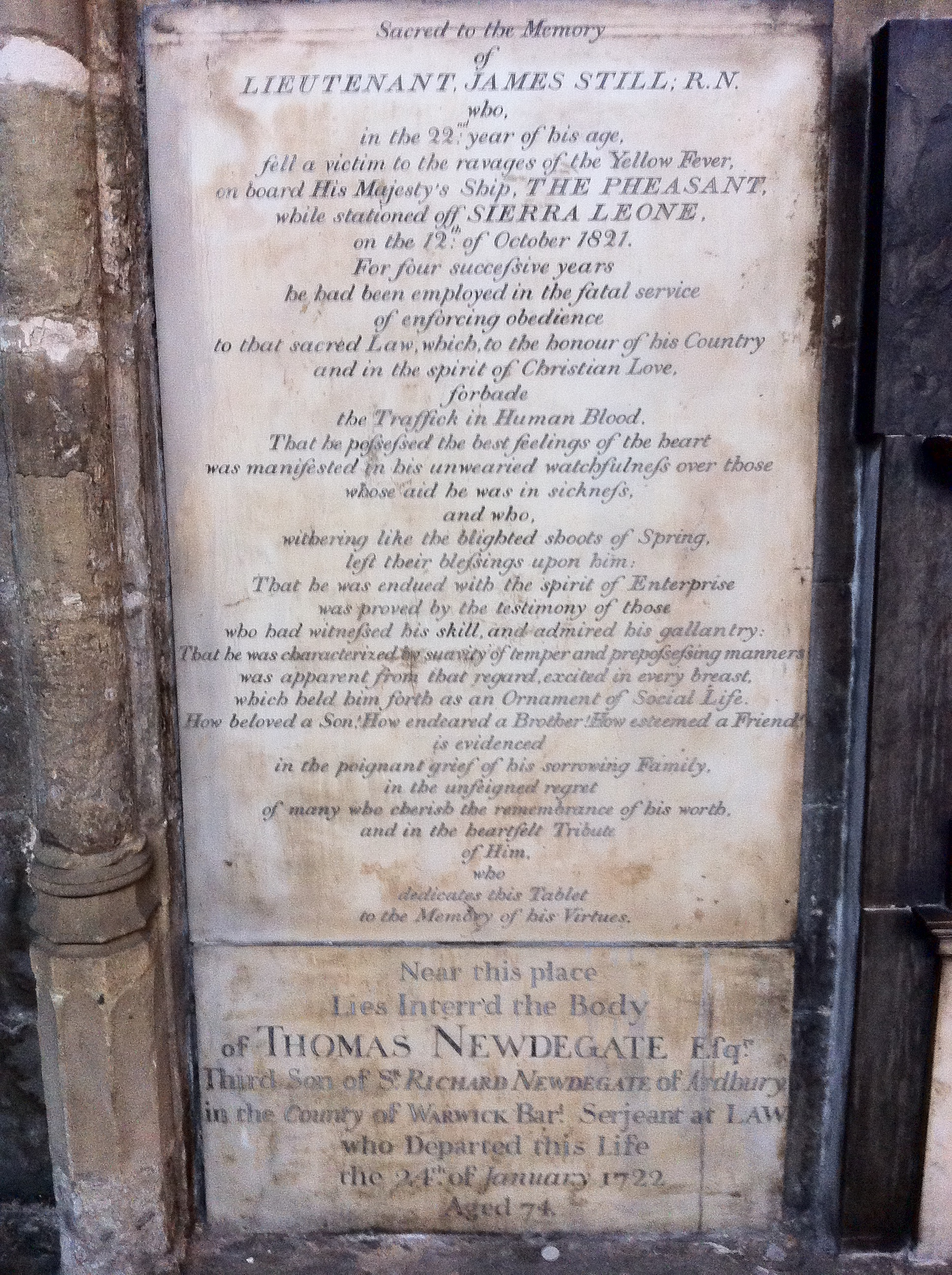
Memorial to Lieutenant James Still in St Mary's Church, Nottingham. Still, of HMS Pheasant, died of yellow fever in 1821

From 1814 to 1818, Pheasant was based in the Channel Fleet. In 1819, she joined the Africa Station patrols off the coast of Africa near Sierra Leone. On 30 July, she detained the Portuguese slave trader Nova Felicidade. On 6 October, she stopped the Portuguese slave trader Vulcano. There were several deaths of crew due to an outbreak of yellow fever.

On 25 July 1821, with Myrmidon, she stopped the Portuguese slave vessel Adelaide, with 232 slaves on board.

== Commanders ==
- 1800–1804: Henry Carew
- 1804–1805: Robert Paul
- 1805–1806: Robert Henderson
- 1806–1814: John Palmer
- 1814–1818: Edmund Waller
- 1818–1819: Benedictus Marwood Kelly
- 1821–1823: Douglas Clavering

== Fate ==
She was sold on 11 July 1827 for £1,250 (equivalent to £114,200 in 2025). to John Small Sedger, Rotherhithe for breaking.

An image of HMS Pheasant appears on a 10p postage stamp of the Ascension Islands.
