= Hired armed cutter Queen Charlotte =

His Majesty's hired armed cutter Queen Charlotte served the Royal Navy on two contracts, the first from 10 June 1803 to 13 February 1805, and the second from 17 September 1807 to 17 May 1814. She was of 7514/94 tons (bm) and carried eight 4-pounder guns. There was also a cutter Queen Charlotte that was present at the taking of Saint Lucia in May 1796 by British forces under Sir Hugh Christian and Sir Ralph Abercrombie.

== First contract ==
On her first contract Queen Charlotte may initially have been under the command of Lieutenant John Drew, on the Newfoundland Station.

On 17 July 1803 Lapwing, Falcon and Queen Charlotte captured Caroline. Then on 28 July, the same three vessels recaptured from the French the brig Mercure, which apparently was British-built and once called Mercury. In November Queen Charlotte was under the command of Lieutenant John G.M.B. McKillop.

In late 1804, Vice-Admiral Erasmus Gower, then Governor of Newfoundland and Labrador, sent Queen Charlotte, under Lieutenant Isaac H. Morrison, to Labrador to investigate reports of an influx of American fishing boats. As a result of the report, the Admiralty decided to station a sloop in the fishing waters to chase off the Americans. In October Morrison transferred to command the newly-launched schooner Herring, which was, however, a smaller vessel. His replacement in 1805 was Lieutenant John Brown.

== Second contract ==
On 26 October 1807 Tsar Alexander I of Russia declared war on Great Britain. The official news did not arrive in the United Kingdom until 2 December, at which time the British declared an embargo on all Russian vessels in British ports. Queen Charlotte was one of some 70 vessels that shared in the seizure of the 44-gun Russian frigate Speshnoy (Speshnyy), then in Portsmouth harbour. (Note: An able seaman's share of the prize money was 14s 7½d.) The British seized the Russian storeship Wilhelmina at the same time.

Later, Queen Charlotte was under master Mr Joseph Thomas when on 22 July 1810 she recaptured William. Then on 29 August near Alderney Queen Charlotte encountered a French vessel of sixteen 12-pounder guns. After a fight of an hour and a half, the French sailed away. Queen Charlotte had one man killed and 14 wounded out of her total complement of 27, including her master and a passenger. One or more of the wounded may have died afterwards. The French vessel was believed to have been the former British revenue cutter Swan, captured two years earlier off Portland, and to have had a crew of 80 to 100 men. James reports the French vessel as having sixteen 6-pounders and a crew of 120. The passenger was a Mr P.A. Mulgrave, who had been employed in establishing a telegraph between Jersey and the British fleet of Cherbourg. He was wounded above the eye while firing a musket but remained on deck, helping with ammunition, during the whole fight. Seven years earlier master J. Thomas had been second in command of the hired armed cutter Princess Augusta during a less bloody but equally lop-sided and ultimately equally successful action.

Later reports have Queen Charlotte conveying vessels between Portsmouth and the Channel Islands.

On 15 June 1812 Queen Charlotte was in company with the hired armed lugger Sandwich when Sandwich captured the French privateer Courageux. Courageux was armed with two guns and carried a crew of 24 men. She was four days out of Brehat and had not captured anything.
