= Jardin Georges Delaselle =

Botanical garden on the Île de Batz, Finistère, Brittany, France

Coordinates: 48.7396°N 3.9929°W

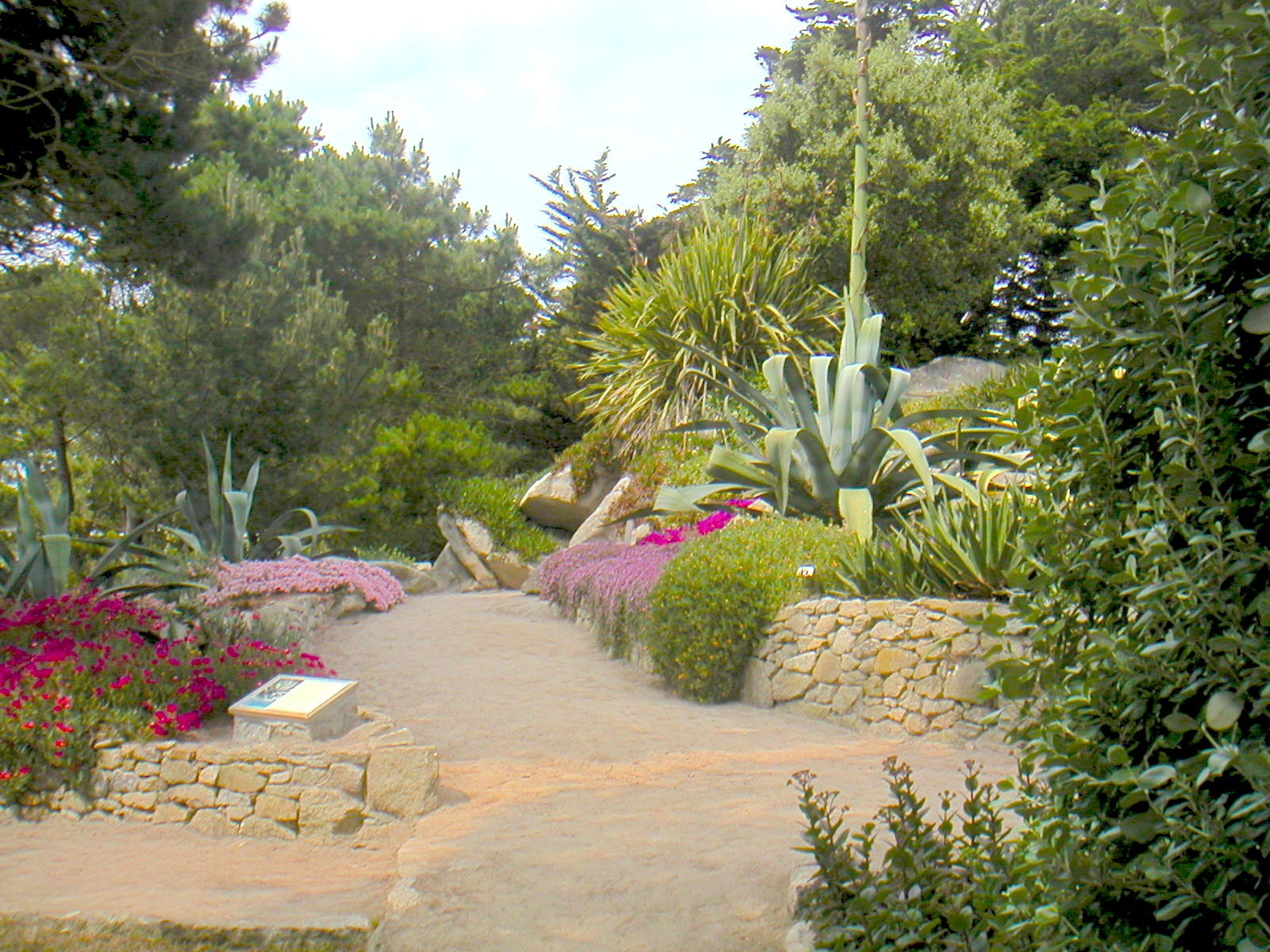
Jardin Georges Delaselle

The Jardin Georges Delaselle (Breton: Liorzh George Delaselle) is a historic botanical garden located on the Île de Batz, Finistère, in the region of Brittany, France. It is open daily except Tuesday in the warmer months; an admission fee is charged.

The garden was created between 1898-1918 by Parisian insurer Georges Albert Delaselle (1861-1944), who supervised excavation among the island's dunes of a deep, terraced bowl five metres in diameter. There he established an excellent collection of exotic plants, but in 1937 he was forced to sell the property, which in 1957 was reworked to be a summer camp. The garden then fell into disuse for thirty years. In 1987 it was repurchased, and with major investments beginning in 1991 it has subsequently been restored. In 1997 the nonprofit Conservatoire de l’Espace Littoral et des Rivages Lacustres assumed ownership.

Today the garden contains more than 2000 plant species suited to the island's Mediterranean climate, with fine collections of palms, cactus, and succulents. Two-thirds are native to the southern hemisphere, primarily from Chile, South Africa, Australia, and New Zealand. The garden also contains a Bronze Age necropolis with the remains of ten tombs.

== See also ==
- List of botanical gardens in France
