= HMS Nova Scotia =

1812 gun-brig

History

United Kingdom
- Name: HMS Nova Scotia
- Acquired: 17 October 1812 by capture
- Fate: Sold for breaking up January 1820

General characteristics
- Type: Gun-brig
- Tons burthen: 190, or 21457/94 (bm)
- Length: 84 ft 0 in (25.6 m) (gundeck); 66 ft 3 in (20.2 m) (keel)
- Beam: 24 ft 8 in (7.5 m)
- Depth of hold: 10 ft 4 in (3.1 m)
- Sail plan: Brig
- Complement: 75
- Armament: 12 × 12-pounder carronades + 2 × 6-pounder chase guns

When HMS Maidstone and HMS Spartan captured the American privateer Rapid in 1812, the Royal Navy took her into service as the 14-gun gun-brig HMS Nova Scotia. She was renamed HMS Ferret in 1813 and sold in 1820.

== Privateer Rapid ==
Rapid, of Portland, Maine, had two commanders, Captain W. Crabtree and Captain Joseph Weeks, during her career as a privateer. Rapid captured one ship, the Experience, and two brigs. Experience's cargo was valued at US$250,000. (Note: Because several vessels shared names, and descriptions were not precise, sources are contradictory or ambiguous. Experience may actually have been captured by the Rapid of Charleston, as Coggeshall reports that she was sent into Savannah.)

The owners of one brig ransomed her and Rapid sent the other, St. Andrews, of eight guns and sailing in ballast, into Portland. Another report has Rapid capturing a barque St Andrews, of eight guns, that she sent into Portland. The ransomed vessel may have been the schooner Mary, of St Thomas, which Rapid ransomed as Rapid could not spare the men for a prize crew. Rapid also captured the brig Pursuit, sailing from Poole to St. Andrews, and the brig Tay, sailing from Dundee for Pictou, New Brunswick. Rapid sent both into Portland. Lastly, Rapid captured and burnt the British New Providence privateer Searcher, of one gun and twenty men.

== Capture ==
On 17 October 1812, Maidstone and Spartan, part of the squadron under Sir John Borlase Warren, were in company when Maidstone captured Rapid on the Saint George's Bank. Rapid was armed with 14 cannon – twelve carronades of various sizes and two long 6-pounder guns – but her crew had thrown eight of her cannons overboard to lighten her during the nine-hour chase. She had a crew of 84 men and was three days out of Portland. Her backers had provisioned her for a three-month cruise, first off the Azores, Madeira and the Cape Verde Islands, and then off Cayenne and Bermuda.

== British service ==
The Vice admiralty court in Halifax, Nova Scotia condemned Rapid, Joseph Weeks, master. Her cargo was lasted as guns, ammunition, and provisions.

The British commissioned her in Halifax in November 1812 as HMS Nova Scotia under Lieutenant Bartholomew Kent, who sailed her to Britain. She was fitted at Plymouth between 7 July and 30 September 1813 and renamed Ferret. She was commissioned again in June or July of that year under Commander William Ramsden.

In May 1814 Ferret was at St Helena under Commander James Stirling. Stirling commissioned Ferret rapidly on Napoleon's return to France from Elba, and received praise for the speed with which he accomplished the task. On 19 July 1815, Ferret was in company with Havannah, Sealark, Rhin, Menelaus, and Fly when they captured the French vessels Fortune, Papillon, Marie Graty, Marie Victorine, Cannoniere, and Printemis. (Note: A first-class share of the prize money was worth £55 18s 4 1/2d; a sixth-class share was worth 10s 10 3/4d.) The attack took place at Korejou Bay, near Brest on the coast of Brittany, and during the action Ferret was able to prevent the escape of a French man-of-war brig that she forced ashore. The action cost Ferret one man. Apparently, this cutting out expedition was the last of the war.

Ferret then sailed to St Helena again on 15 August 1815 as part of the squadron under Northumberland that was taking Napoleon Bonaparte into exile. On her way home she encountered the Spanish brigantine Dolores. At the time, Ferret's armament consisted of only eight carronades, (Note: Ferret had landed her two long guns at Ascension for that island's defense, and stowed four of her carronades to make room on her deck for extra water.) while Dolores had a long 32-pounder gun on a pivot, four long 9-pounder guns, and two 12-pounder carronades. Ferret was therefore outranged. Dolores's initial fire killed two men in Ferret. In the subsequent action, which lasted some three hours, Ferret lost another three men wounded, two of whom died later from their wounds, before she came alongside Dolores, at which point the Spaniard struck. Dolores was carrying 275 slaves, so Ferret took her to Sierra Leone for the vessel and cargo to be condemned for violating the British prohibition on the slave trade. (Note: Dolores appears to be the vessel under the command of Jose Carbonell with Santiago Rauto y Oliver and Pie and Co. as owners. She landed 249 slaves at Freetown, a number having died on the way.) This gave rise to a suit in which the Court found that Rear Admiral Sir George Cockburn was entitled to the flag officer's share of the prize money.

The Admiralty placed Ferret in ordinary at Plymouth in June 1816. She was fitted for sea again March–April 1817 under Lieutenant William Pitman. At some point in the year she may have come under the command of W. Ramsden, though she was under Pitman's command in 1818.

== Fate ==
Ferret was sold at Plymouth on 13 January 1820 to a Mr. Rundle for £460.
