= HMS Menelaus (1810) =

Frigate of the Royal Navy

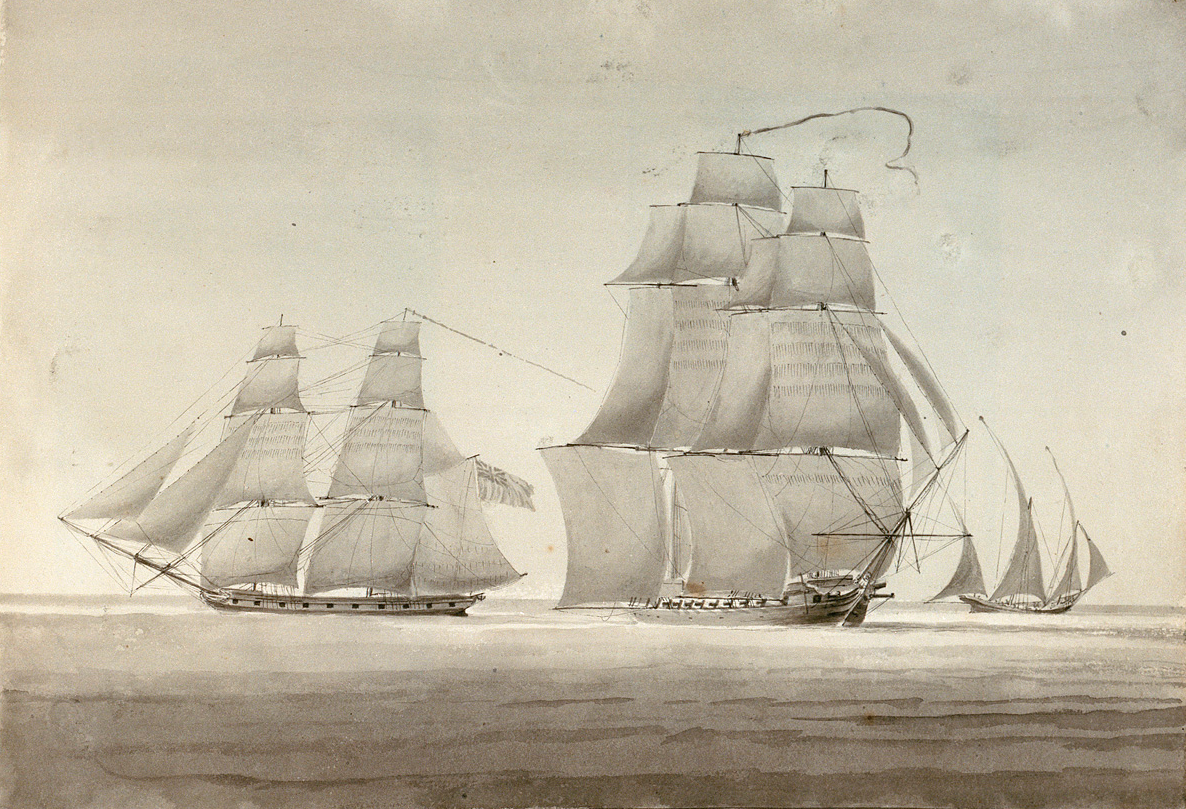
- HMS Menelaus (in centre) by William Innes Pocock R.N.

History

United Kingdom
- Name: HMS Menelaus
- Namesake: Menelaus
- Ordered: 28 September 1808
- Builder: Plymouth Dockyard
- Laid down: November 1808
- Launched: 17 April 1810
- Completed: 21 June 1810
- Fate: Sold to be broken up, 10 May 1897

General characteristics
- Class & type: Lively-class frigate
- Tons burthen: 1,071 51/94 bm
- Length: 154 ft (47 m)
- Beam: 39 ft 5 in (12.01 m)
- Draught: 13 ft 6 in (4.11 m)
- Propulsion: Sail
- Sail plan: Full-rigged ship
- Complement: 284
- Armament: As ordered: UD: 28 × 18-pounder guns; QD: 2 × 9-pounder guns + 12 × 32-pounder carronades; FC: 2 × 9-pounder guns + 2 × 32-pounder carronades

HMS Menelaus was a Royal Navy 38-gun fifth rate frigate, launched in 1810 at Plymouth.

== Career ==
Menelaus entered service in 1810 under the command of Captain Peter Parker, and within weeks of commissioning was involved in the suppression of a mutiny aboard HMS Africaine. The notoriously brutal Captain Robert Corbet had been appointed to command Africaine and the crew had protested and refused to allow him to board. The Admiralty sent three popular officers to negotiate with the crew and ordered Menelaus to come alongside. If the crew of Africaine refused to agree with the appointment of Corbet, Parker had been ordered to fire on the ship until they submitted. The crew eventually agreed to allow Corbet aboard and Menelaus was not needed. In the summer of 1810, Parker was ordered to sail for the Indian Ocean to reinforce the squadron operating against Île de France and participated in the capture of the island in December 1810. (Note: The Admiral's share of the prize money was £2650 5s 2d. A first-class share was worth £278 19s 5 3/4d; a sixth-class share, that of an ordinary seaman, was worth £3 7s 6 1/4d. A fourth and final payment was made in July 1828. A first-class share was worth £29 19s 5 1/4d; a sixth-class share was worth 8s 2 1/2d. This time, Admiral Bertie received £314 14s 3 1/2d.)

In 1812, Menelaus was part of the blockade of Toulon in the Mediterranean and operated against coastal harbours, shipping and privateers off the southern coast of France with some success. In 1813, Menelaus was transferred to the Atlantic for service convoying merchant ships to Canada in the War of 1812. On 23 March she captured Le Nouveau Phoenix. (Note: A first class share was worth £114 7s 6 1/4d; a sixth-class share was worth 15s 7 1/4d)

Menelaus was subsequently employed in raiding American positions along the Maryland coastline, destroying a coastal convoy in September. In 1814, Parker was ordered to operate against French ships in the Atlantic and recaptured a valuable Spanish merchant ship in January.

Following the French surrender, Menelaus returned to service off the American seaboard. Menelaus 'was sent up the Chesapeake to divert the attention of the enemy in that quarter,' whilst General Ross's force was landed at Benedict. One of the ships crewman, Midshipman Frederick Chamier wrote "Our duty consisted in an eternal annoyance of the enemy, and therefore night and day we were employed in offensive operations..." Thereafter, Peter Parker was killed at the Battle of Caulk's Field in Kent County, Maryland, on 30 August 1814. He was among 14 British killed at the battle. From 13 to 15 September, Menelaus was present at the Battle of Baltimore, with one of her complement, William Pritchard, being hospitalised after losing two fingers. She returned to England in May 1815.

On 19 July 1815, Menelaus was in company with Havannah, Rhin, Sealark, Ferret and Fly when they captured the French vessels Fortune, Papillon, Marie Graty, Marie Victorine, Cannoniere, and Printemps. (Note: A first-class share of the prize money was worth £55 18s 4 1/2d; a sixth-class share was worth 10s 10 3/4d.) The attack took place at Corrijou (Koréjou, east of Abervrach on the coast of Brittany), and during the action Ferret was able to prevent the escape of a French man-of-war brig that she forced ashore. Apparently, this cutting out expedition was the last of the war.

== Later career and fate ==
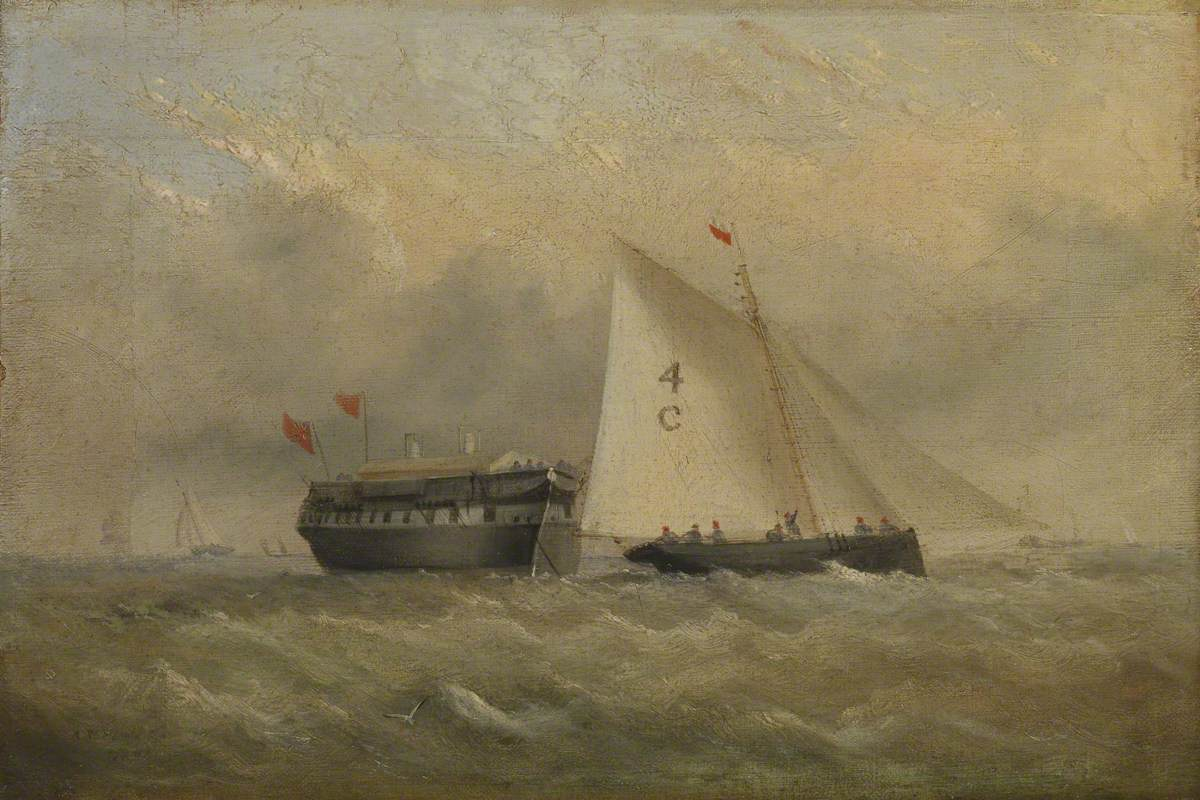
Menelaus as a quarantine hulk off Binstead, near Motherbank

Following Parker's death, command passed to Edward Dix and he remained on the ship until she was laid up at Sheerness in 1818. In 1820 she moved to Chatham and in 1832 became a hospital ship, becoming the quarantine ship at Sandgate Street. She was eventually sold 87 years after her construction, in 1897.
