= Sir Peter Parker, 2nd Baronet =

Royal Navy officer (1785–1814)

Captain Sir Peter Parker Bt
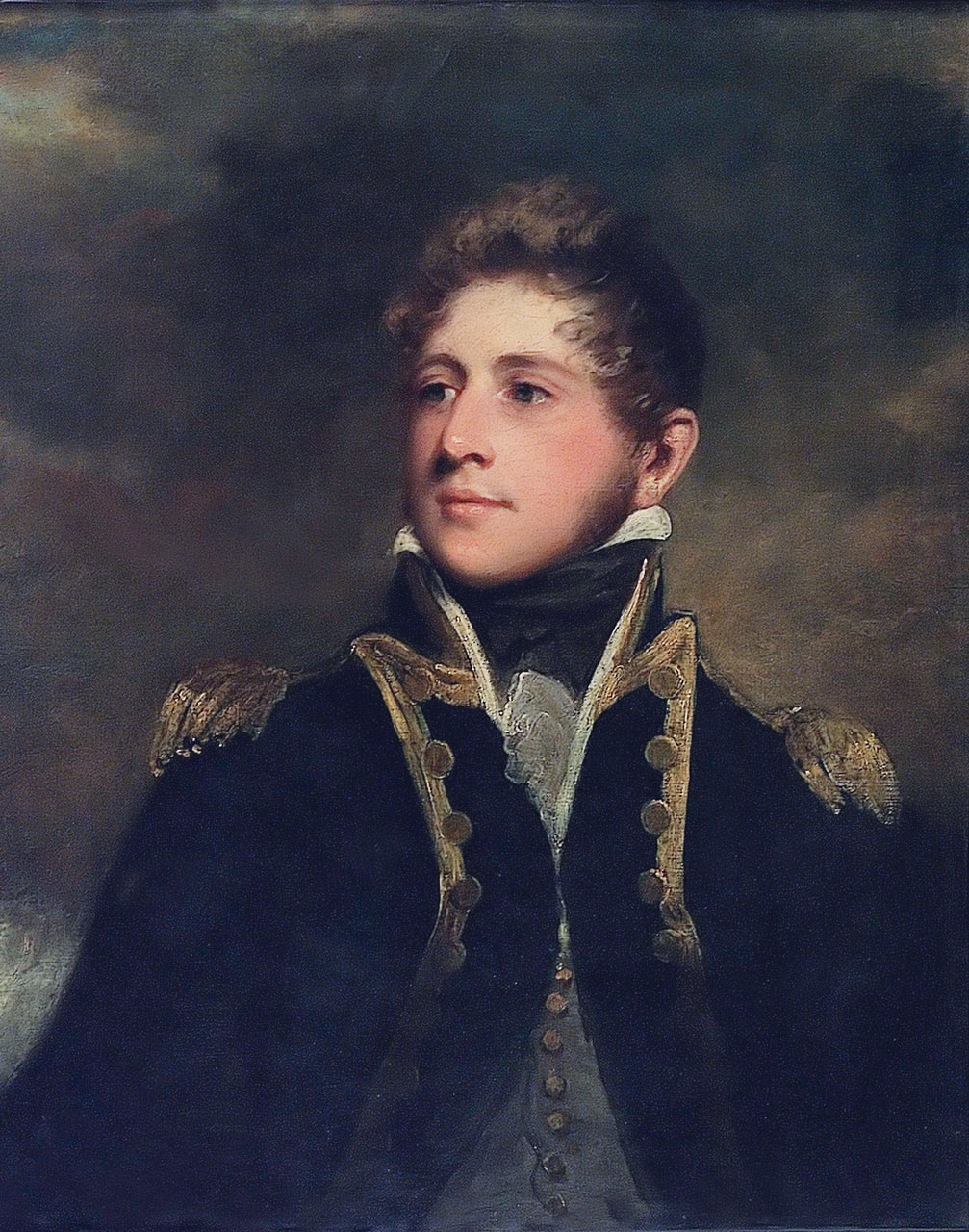
- Captain Peter Parker (John Hoppner)
- Born: 1785
- Died: 31 August 1814 (aged 28–29); Kent County, Maryland, U.S.
- Burial place: St Margaret's, Westminster
- Spouse: Marianne Dallas (m. 1809–1814)
- Children: 3
- Relatives: Sir Peter Parker (grandfather); John Byron (grandfather); Lord Byron (cousin)
- Military career
- Allegiance: United Kingdom
- Branch: Royal Navy
- Service years: 1798–1814
- Rank: Captain
- Commands: HMS John; HMS Weazel; HMS Melpomene; HMS Menelaus
- Conflicts: French Revolutionary Wars; Napoleonic Wars; Invasion of Isle de France; War of 1812; Battle of Caulk's Field †

Sir Peter Parker, 2nd Baronet (1785 – 31 August 1814) was a Royal Navy officer, the son of Vice-Admiral Christopher Parker and Augusta Byron. He commanded the frigate HMS Menelaus in the Napoleonic Wars and the War of 1812, and was killed leading a shore party against Maryland militia at the Battle of Caulk's Field.

== Early life and education ==
Parker was the descendant of several Royal Navy flag officers. His father, Vice-Admiral Christopher Parker, was the son of Admiral Sir Peter Parker, and his mother, Augusta Byron, was the daughter of Vice-Admiral John Byron. Educated at Westminster School, he entered the Royal Navy in 1798, serving under his grandfather and his grandfather's friend, Lord Nelson in Victory.

== Career ==
Parker was made lieutenant in 1801 and was promoted in May 1804 to commander. The next year he took command of the brig Weazel. The Weazel was the first British vessel to sight the Franco-Spanish fleet leaving Cádiz, an action that precipitated the Battle of Trafalgar. For this service he was promoted to captain in 1805.

Because his father had died in 1804, Parker succeeded directly to the baronetcy on the death of his grandfather in December 1811.

Parker was briefly a Member of Parliament. He was returned unopposed as a Tory for the Irish borough constituency of Wexford at a by-election held on 3 March 1810. He resigned the seat in 1811 and was replaced at a by-election on 1 July 1811.

In 1810, he was given command of the frigate Menelaus, which he commissioned. Within weeks of commissioning she was involved in the suppression of a mutiny aboard Africaine. The notoriously brutal Captain Robert Corbet had been appointed to command Africaine and the crew had protested and refused to allow him to board. The Admiralty sent three popular officers to negotiate with the crew and ordered Menelaus to come alongside. If the crew of Africaine refused to agree with the appointment of Corbet, Parker had been ordered to fire on the ship until they submitted. The crew eventually agreed to allow Corbet aboard and Menelaus did not have to fire on Africaine. In the summer of 1810, Parker sailed for the Indian Ocean to reinforce the squadron operating against Île de France, where he participated in the capture of the island in December 1810.

In 1812, Menelaus was part of the blockade of Toulon in the Mediterranean and operated against coastal harbours, shipping and privateers off the southern coast of France with some success. In 1813, the frigate was transferred to the Atlantic for service convoying merchant ships to Canada in the War of 1812. Menelaus was subsequently employed in raiding American positions along the Maryland coastline, destroying a coastal convoy in September. In 1814, Parker was ordered to operate against French ships in the Atlantic and recaptured a valuable Spanish merchant ship in January.

Following Napoleon's abdication in April 1814, Menelaus was assigned to the North American Station and sailed to Bermuda, from which the Royal Navy's blockade of the American Atlantic coast was directed. From Bermuda, Parker joined the British forces in the Chesapeake Bay under Admiral Sir George Cockburn and took part in the blockade of Baltimore. A bold and efficient commander, he became known for his ferocity in destroying American farms and property along the Chesapeake. Having for several days raided Kent County, Maryland, he attempted a night attack on a detachment of Maryland militia at Fairlee, Maryland on the night of 30 August 1814. Parker, who had recently liberated four slaves after raiding the plantation of Richard Frisby, was told by one slave that there was an American militia unit nearby. Parker landed a shore party of seamen and marines from Menelaus near Tolchester, Maryland and had the slave guide him to the position. There he met resistance from the 21st Maryland Militia under command of Lt. Colonel Phillip Reed in the corn field of Isaac Caulk. This precipitated the Battle of Caulk's Field; while British and American sources differ on the result of the battle, Parker was one of the casualties.

Leading his marines, he was hit in the thigh (as his grandfather had been at the Battle of Sullivan's Island), but unlike his grandfather, Parker died on the field of a severed femoral artery. According to Midshipman Frederick Chamier, "The whole animation of the party died when he drooped ... The Americans fortunately had begun another retreat; and our ceasing fire only led them to believe that we were following the quicker. Sir Peter's only words were these: 'I fear they have done for me ... you had better retreat, for the boats are a long way off.'"

== Death ==
It took only about 10 minutes for Parker to bleed to death. 14 men under Parker's command died at Caulk's Field, 12 of whom remain buried in unmarked graves at the site of the battle. The Americans returned Captain Parker's shoe, which had been lost on the battlefield, with his name and maker's number written in it, under the assumption that he had been honourably wounded.

Parker's body was sent to St. George's, Bermuda, and buried at St. Peter's Church on 14 October 1814 (the funeral service being conducted by Chaplain Rennell of HMS Albion), but at the request of one of his executors, Captain Edmund Palmer, was subsequently exhumed on 2 April 1815 (by Rector of St. George's Philip Hudson), and transported to England aboard the frigate HMS Hebrus to be re-interred at the family vault at St Margaret's, Westminster, a public funeral with military honours being held on both occasions. He was eulogised by his first cousin, Lord Byron.

== Family ==
Parker married Marianne Dallas, daughter of Sir George Dallas, 1st Bt. They had three sons:

- Commander Sir Peter Parker, 3rd Baronet (1809–1835), promoted to commander on 3 March 1834, then of HMS Vernon
- ? Parker (d. bef. 1835)
- George Parker (February 1815 – 23 November 1817), born after his father's death; died of croup.

== Notes ==
Parliament of the United Kingdom
Preceded by Richard Nevill	Member of Parliament for Wexford; 1810–1811	Succeeded by Richard Nevill
Baronetage of Great Britain
Preceded by Peter Parker	Baronet (of Bassingbourn); 1811–1814	Succeeded by Peter Parker
