= Battle of Caulk's Field =

Battle of the War of 1812

- Part of the War of 1812
| Date | August 31, 1814 |
| Location | Kent County, Maryland 39°12′22″N 76°11′53″W |
| Result | American victory |

Belligerents
| British Empire | United States |

Commanders and leaders
| Sir Peter Parker † | Philip Reed |

Units involved
| Royal Navy; Royal Marines | 21st Regiment of Maryland Militia |

Strength
| 124–250 marines and sailors | c. 200 militia |

Casualties and losses
| 14 killed 27 wounded | 3 wounded |

The Battle of Caulk's Field was fought during the War of 1812 in Kent County, Maryland, United States, between a small force commanded by Captain Sir Peter Parker of the Royal Navy and American militia forces commanded by Lieutenant Colonel Philip Reed. Parker, who was operating in the Chesapeake Bay region as part of the British campaign against Baltimore, Maryland, landed on the eastern shore of the Chesapeake Bay to move against Reed's militia encampment. The British attacking force encountered American skirmishers, who conducted a fighting retreat, drawing the British towards the main American line. Parker was mortally wounded during the fight, and the British force withdrew after Parker fell. The British abandoned their campaign against Baltimore after the death of Major General Robert Ross at the Battle of North Point and the failure of the naval bombardment of Fort McHenry. In 2012, the battlefield was the site of an archaeological survey.

== Background ==
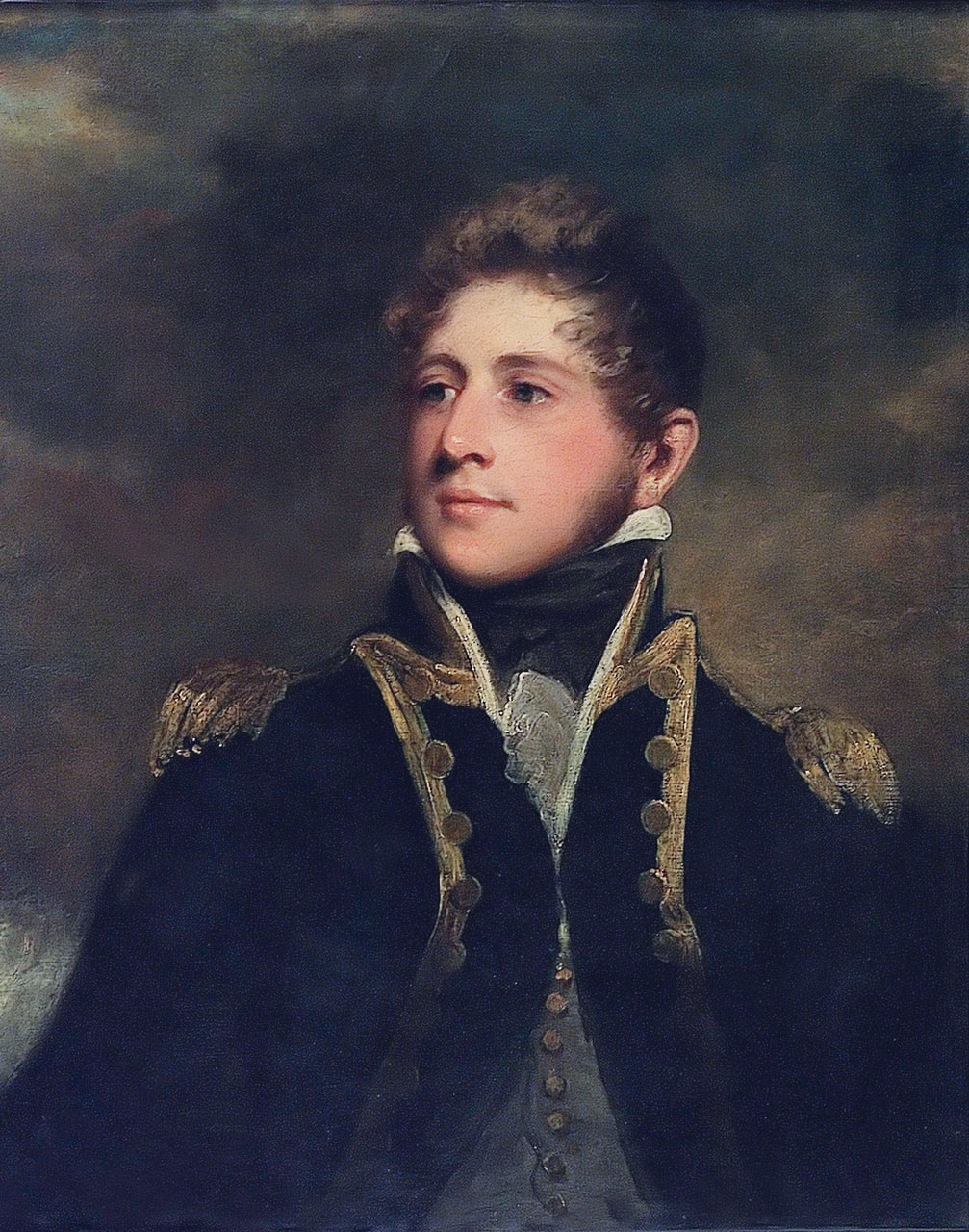
Sir Peter Parker

In 1814, as part of the War of 1812, a British expeditionary force entered the Chesapeake Bay. Vice Admiral Sir Alexander Cochrane, naval commander-in-chief of the North American Station, directed operations in the bay, with Rear Admiral Sir George Cockburn as his second-in-command; Major General Robert Ross of the British Army commanded the accompanying land force. In late August, Captain Sir Peter Parker of the frigate HMS Menelaus was sent in the direction of Baltimore, Maryland as a diversion with the intent of drawing American troops away from the Washington, D.C. area. Parker's orders also included raiding the rural areas along the coast of the bay. On August 24, British troops defeated an American force at the Battle of Bladensburg, which opened the path to Washington. The British then burned the American capital. After the destruction of Washington, the British then focused on attacking Baltimore. Parker, who was still operating in the northern portion of the Chesapeake Bay, learned that American militia were encamped near Georgetown, Maryland on the eastern shore of the Chesapeake Bay.

== Battle ==
Parker's force (Note: Estimates of the strength of Parker's force vary. Elting gives a total of 124, Hickey estimates 250, Sharpe suggests about 150, and the website of Kent County, Maryland gives a total of 140.) landed late on the night of August 30. Sailors from the Royal Navy and men of the Royal Marines were represented in the British column. The militiamen, of the 21st Regiment of Maryland Militia, were commanded by Lieutenant Colonel Philip Reed, who had fought in the American Revolution. The British had been told of the militia encampment by a Black informant; Lieutenant Henry Crease, who assumed command of Menelaus on Parker's death, reported that "an intelligent black man gave us information of two hundred militia being encamped behind a wood, distant half a mile from the beach". During the advance inland, guides, who may have been victims of impressment, misled the British column, allowing the Americans, who numbered about 200, to be better prepared for the British assault. Parker's force encountered American skirmishers, who quickly retreated to the main American line. The retreating skirmishers led the British towards the American line, which included multiple cannons. The battle took place at night, and the light of a full moon exposed the British soldiers during their advance, allowing the Americans to inflict several casualties. The Americans held the high ground, giving the defenders an advantage. Lieutenant Henry Crease, who signed the British report of the action as acting commander, reported that one portion of the British attacking force was briefly able to gain a foothold in the main American position on the high ground, at one point taking one of the American cannons. However, American pressure forced the British to abandon the toehold. The Americans eventually began to run out of ammunition, but Parker was then wounded in the thigh and bled to death. The British fell back after Parker's death. American casualties totaled three wounded. British casualties are reported at 41.

== Aftermath ==
While the outcome of the fight increased American morale, it did not discourage the British from pressing their assault on Baltimore. On September 12, Ross' infantry force won a tactical victory over an American force at the Battle of North Point. Ross was mortally wounded during the fighting, and the British advance was slowed. The naval prong of the British assault on Baltimore was blunted when the naval bombardment of Fort McHenry, which occurred on September 13 and 14, failed to accomplish substantial results. The British infantry force, now commanded by Colonel Arthur Brooke, withdrew early on the morning of the 14th, and the naval force withdrew after the failure of the bombardment of Fort McHenry and the failure of an attempted amphibious assault, ending the assault on Baltimore.

A historic marker, erected in 1902, marks the location of the southern edge of the battlefield.

== Archaeological survey ==
In March 2012, an archaeological team from the Maryland State Highway Administration and the University of Maryland began an archaeological survey of the battlefield, which is considered to be one of the best-preserved War of 1812 sites in Maryland. The survey used metal detectors to locate artifacts, and discovered 721 items in the area of the battle site. However, many of the items postdated the fight. Some of the items related to the battle that were discovered included musket balls, cannon ammunition, and firearm parts. The caliber of the standard small arms used by the two sides was different, which allowed the musket balls to be identified as having been fired by either the British or the Americans. The finds were interpreted as corroborating the historic accounts of the fighting in some aspects: the artifact patterning placed the American line on the high ground and was consistent with the accounts of American skirmishers conducting a fighting retreat towards the main American line. An unfired British musket ball was found near where the American artillery position is believed to have been, which may support Crease's statement about the temporary capture of an American cannon. Additionally, the archaeological finds suggest that the battle was fought over a larger area than was previously thought.

== Sources ==
- Elting, John R. (1995). Amateurs, To Arms! A Military History of the War of 1812 (1st Da Capo ed.). New York: Da Capo Press. ISBN 0-306-80653-3.
- Hickey, Donald R. (2012). The War of 1812: A Forgotten Conflict. Urbana, Illinois: University of Illinois Press. ISBN 978-0-252-07837-8.
- Sharpe, Katherine (September–October 2013). "Battlefield: 1814". Archaeology Magazine. 66 (5). Archaeological Institute of America: 42–45. ISSN 0003-8113.
