= Île de Batz =

Île-de-Batz Enez-Vaz
- Commune
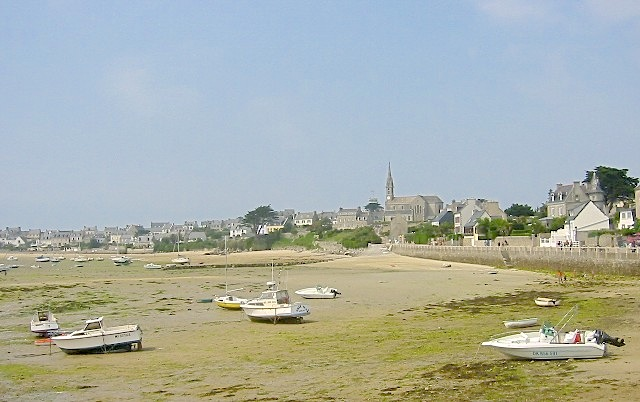
- Porz Kernog on Île de Batz

- Flag Coat of arms
- Location of Île-de-Batz
- Location within France Location within Brittany
- Coordinates: 48°44′43″N 4°00′35″W
- Country: France
- Region: Brittany
- Department: Finistère
- Arrondissement: Morlaix
- Canton: Saint-Pol-de-Léon

Government
  - Mayor (2021–2026): Eric Grall
- Area^{1}: 3.05 km^{2} (1.18 sq mi)
- Highest elevation: 33 m (108 ft)
- Lowest elevation: 0 m (0 ft)
- Population (2023): 458
  - Density: 150/km^{2} (389/sq mi)
- Time zone: UTC+01:00 (CET)
  - Summer (DST): UTC+02:00 (CEST)
- INSEE/Postal code: 29082 /29253
- ^{1} French Land Register data, which excludes lakes, ponds, glaciers > 1 km^{2} (0.386 sq mi or 247 acres) and river estuaries.

The Île de Batz (French pronunciation: [il də ba]; Breton: Enez-Vaz) is an island off Roscoff in Brittany, France. Administratively, it is a commune in the Finistère department of Brittany in north-western France. Batz probably reflects a form of the Breton term ''baz'' which denotes a shallow rocky rise in the sea-bed, exposed at low tide and covered at high tide by the sea.The traditional etymology linking it to a legend that Paul Aurelian drew water from the island by striking a rock with his staff (''bazh'') is no longer accepted.

== Climate ==
Île de Batz has an oceanic climate (Köppen climate classification Cfb). The average annual temperature in Île de Batz is 12.0 °C (53.6 °F). The average annual rainfall is 894.4 mm (35.21 in) with December as the wettest month. The temperatures are highest on average in August, at around 17.0 °C (62.6 °F), and lowest in February, at around 7.7 °C (45.9 °F). The highest temperature ever recorded in Île de Batz was 35.0 °C (95.0 °F) on 18 August 1932; the coldest temperature ever recorded was −10.0 °C (14.0 °F) on 14 February 1929 and 18 December 1927.

Comparison of local Meteorological data with other cities in France
Town	Sunshine (hours/yr)	Rain (mm/yr)	Snow (days/yr)	Storm (days/yr)	Fog (days/yr)
National average	1,973	770	14	22	40
Île de Batz	1,735.2	872.3	4.0	5.2	26.6
Paris	1,661	637	12	18	10
Nice	2,724	767	1	29	1
Strasbourg	1,693	665	29	29	56
Brest	1,605	1,211	7	12	75

Climate data for Île de Batz (1981–2010 averages, extremes 1917−present)
Month	Jan	Feb	Mar	Apr	May	Jun	Jul	Aug	Sep	Oct	Nov	Dec	Year
Record high °C (°F)	17.7 (63.9)	19.8 (67.6)	24.3 (75.7)	26.8 (80.2)	29.5 (85.1)	31.9 (89.4)	34.0 (93.2)	35.0 (95.0)	31.6 (88.9)	30.2 (86.4)	19.6 (67.3)	18.8 (65.8)	35.0 (95.0)
Mean daily maximum °C (°F)	9.9 (49.8)	9.9 (49.8)	11.4 (52.5)	12.6 (54.7)	14.9 (58.8)	17.4 (63.3)	19.3 (66.7)	19.7 (67.5)	18.4 (65.1)	15.9 (60.6)	12.8 (55.0)	10.7 (51.3)	14.4 (57.9)
Daily mean °C (°F)	7.9 (46.2)	7.7 (45.9)	9.0 (48.2)	10.0 (50.0)	12.4 (54.3)	14.7 (58.5)	16.6 (61.9)	17.0 (62.6)	15.8 (60.4)	13.5 (56.3)	10.6 (51.1)	8.6 (47.5)	12.0 (53.6)
Mean daily minimum °C (°F)	5.8 (42.4)	5.5 (41.9)	6.7 (44.1)	7.5 (45.5)	9.8 (49.6)	12.1 (53.8)	13.9 (57.0)	14.2 (57.6)	13.1 (55.6)	11.1 (52.0)	8.4 (47.1)	6.4 (43.5)	9.6 (49.3)
Record low °C (°F)	−9.2 (15.4)	−10.0 (14.0)	−4.2 (24.4)	−1.0 (30.2)	0.8 (33.4)	4.4 (39.9)	6.0 (42.8)	6.4 (43.5)	4.4 (39.9)	1.0 (33.8)	−4.4 (24.1)	−10.0 (14.0)	−10.0 (14.0)
Average precipitation mm (inches)	101.7 (4.00)	81.9 (3.22)	71.2 (2.80)	65.7 (2.59)	61.3 (2.41)	48.5 (1.91)	45.5 (1.79)	48.2 (1.90)	54.5 (2.15)	97.0 (3.82)	102.5 (4.04)	116.4 (4.58)	894.4 (35.21)
Average precipitation days (≥ 1.0 mm)	16.1	12.6	12.8	11.9	10.3	8.3	8.3	8.5	8.9	13.9	15.8	17.0	144.3
Average relative humidity (%)	83	82	82	82	84	84	85	85	85	84	82	83	83.4
Mean monthly sunshine hours	59.1	85.0	127.3	172.5	215.8	210.7	234.3	211.5	167.6	121.2	75.1	55.1	1,735.2
Source: Meteociel, Infoclimat.fr (humidity and sunshine 1961-1990)

== Population ==
Inhabitants of Île-de-Batz are called in French Batziens or Îliens.

At the census of 1999 the island had a population of 575, and in 2005 it had an estimated population of 594.

== Sights ==
- Jardin Georges Delaselle
- Lighthouse

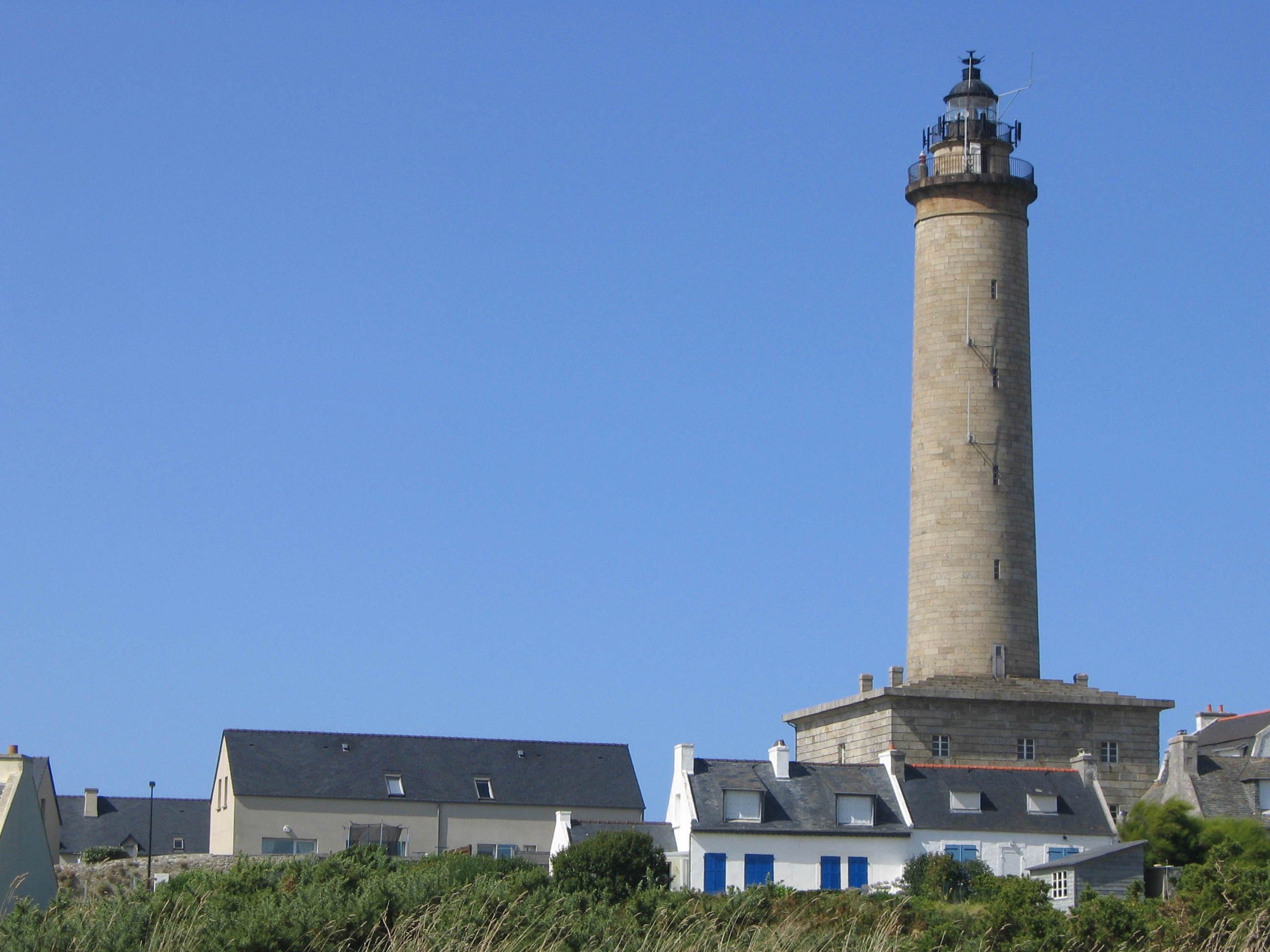
The lighthouse of l'île de Batz

== See also ==
- Communes of the Finistère department
