= HMS Fly (1813) =

Cruizer-class brig-sloop of the Royal Navy

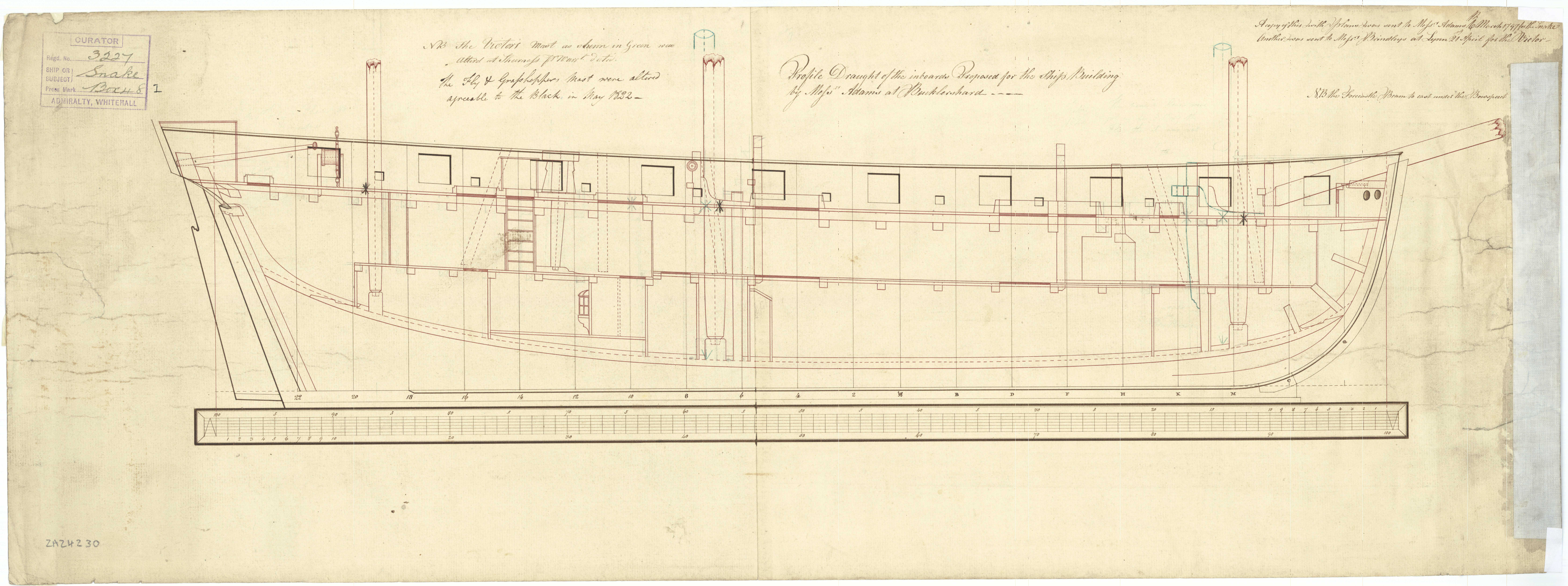
- Fly when re-rigged as a ship sloop in 1822

History

United Kingdom
- Name: HMS Fly
- Builder: Jabez Bayley, Ipswich
- Launched: 1813
- Commissioned: 1813
- Decommissioned: 1828
- Fate: Sold, 1828

General characteristics
- Class & type: Cruizer-class brig-sloop
- Tons burthen: 38677/94 (bm)
- Length: 100 ft 5 in (30.6 m) o/a; 77 ft 9 in (23.7 m) (keel)
- Beam: 30 ft 7 in (9.3 m)
- Draught: 7 ft 7 in (2.3 m) (unladen); 11 ft 6 in (3.5 m) (laden)
- Sail plan: Brig
- Complement: 121
- Armament: 16 × 32-pounder carronades; 2 × 6-pounder bow guns

HMS Fly (1813) was a Royal Navy Cruizer-class brig-sloop built by Jabez Bailey at Ipswich. She was ordered 23 April 1812, launched on 16 February 1813 and commissioned May 1813.

She served:

- on the Channel station under Sir William G. Parker from May 1813,
- on the Newfoundland Station from June 1814 until paid off in April 1815,
- on the Cork station, after recommissioning in 1818, until December 1821,
- on Cape of Good Hope Station from December 1821,
- in South America from 1823,
- in East Indies from 1825.

In December 1826 Fly, under Captain Frederick Augustus Wetherall, supported the short-lived settlement of Western Port, in southern Victoria, Australia.

She was sold in Bombay on 10 April 1828.

== See also ==
- Sir William Martin, 4th Baronet, commander on South American station in 1823
