= Bombardment of Algiers (1816) order of battle =

This is a listing of the fleets that participated in the Bombardment of Algiers on August 27, 1816.

== Allies ==
=== British ===
Ship	Guns	Commander	Casualties		Notes
Ship	Guns	Commander	Killed	Wounded	Notes
Queen Charlotte	104	Adm. Lord Exmouth; Capt. James Brisbane	8	131	First-rate ship of the line
Impregnable	98	Rear-Adm. David Milne; Capt. Edward Brace	50	160	Second-rate ship of the line
Albion	74	Capt. John Coode	3	15	Third-rate ship of the line
Minden	74	Capt. Joseph Prior	7	37	Third-rate ship of the line
Superb	74	Capt. Charles Ekins	8	84	Third-rate ship of the line
Leander	50	Capt. Edward Chetham-Strode	17	118	Fourth-rate ship of the line
Glasgow	40	Capt. Anthony Maitland	10	37	Frigate
Severn	40	Capt. Frederick William Aylmer	3	34	Frigate
Granicus	36	Capt. William Furlong Wise	16	42	Frigate
Hebrus	36	Capt. Edmund Palmer	4	15	Frigate
Heron	18	Capt. George Bentham	-	-	Brig-sloop
Mutine	18	Cdr. James Mould			Brig-sloop
Prometheus	18	Cdr. William B. Dashwood	-	-	Brig-sloop
Britomart	10	Cdr. Robert Riddell	-	-	Brig-sloop
Cordelia	10	Cdr. William Sargent	-	-	Brig-sloop
Beelzebub	10	Cdr. William Kempthorn	1	3	Bomb vessel w/two mortars
Fury	10	Cdr. Constantine Richard Moorsom	-	-	Bomb w/two mortars
Infernal	12	Cdr. George James Perceval	2	17	Bomb w/two mortars
Hecla	12	Cdr. William Popham	-	-	Bomb w/two mortars
Express	4	-	-	-	Advice boat tender to Revenge

Also the "Battering Flotilla", under the command of Capt. Frederick Thomas Michell, and comprising 55 vessels; gun-boats, mortar-boats, launches with carronades, rocket-boats, barges, and yawls.

==== Other British ====
Although James lists these three vessels as leaving England with the flotilla for Algiers, none actually served there.

Ship	Guns	Commander	Notes
Saracen	18	Cdr. Alexander Dixie	Brig-sloop. Left behind at Gibraltar. Although James refers to Saracen in his account of the preparations for the bombardment, he is in error. By 1816 Commander Alexander Dixie was no longer in command of Saracen, and she was at Bermuda.
Satellite	18	Capt. James Murray	Brig-sloop. This was probably the vessel left behind at Gibraltar, with Saracen being a typographical mistake for Satelite
Jasper	10	Cdr. Thomas Carew	Brig-sloop. Only as far as Gibraltar, then returning home with dispatches.

=== Netherlands ===
Ship	Guns	Commander	Casualties		Notes
Ship	Guns	Commander	Killed	Wounded	Notes
Amstel	44	Capt. Willem Augustus van der Hart	4	6	Frigate
Diana	44	Capt. Petrus Zievogel	6	22	Frigate
Frederica	44	Capt. Jakob Adrian van der Straaten	-	5	Frigate
Melampus	44	Vice-adm. Jonkheer Theodorus Frederik van Capellen; Capt. Antony Willem de Man	3	15	Frigate, flagship
Dageraad	36	Capt. Johannes Martinus Polders	-	4	Frigate
Eendragt	20	Capt. Jan Frederik Christiaan Wardenburg	-	-	Corvette

== Algiers ==
Ship	Guns	Notes
4 Frigates	44	1 scuttled, the rest burnt?
5 Corvettes	24-30	Burnt?
30-40 Gunboats and Mortar vessels		Burnt?
55 Others?		

James mentions that a French frigate of 40 guns, named Ciotat, had warned the Algerines of the coming attack. However, there was no vessel by that name in the French Navy between 1786 and 1861. Other sources refer to Ciotat as a gabarre or a corvette, and make no mention of her being a man-of-war.
