= HMS Royal Charlotte =

Six vessels of the Royal Navy have borne the name HMS (or HMY) Royal Charlotte, after Charlotte of Mecklenburg-Strelitz, consort of King George III.

- HMY Royal Charlotte was the royal yacht HMY Royal Caroline, launched in 1750, renamed in 1761, and broken up in 1820.
- HMS Royal Charlotte (1764) was a 10-gun sloop built at Navy Island and launched in 1764 for service principally, on Lake Huron, for the Provincial Marine, and in service until 1772.
- HMS Royal Charlotte (1780) was a 14-gun French privateer of 520 tons that the 14-gun brig-sloop HMS Scourge and the 10-gun cutter HMS Surprize captured on 15 September 1780, and that the Royal Navy used as a transport until 10 April 1783 when she was sold at Milford.
- HMS Royal Charlotte (1824) was a 6-gun yacht launched in 1824 and broken up in 1832.
- ML 6024 and ML 6028 were ex-German vessels that the Royal Navy used between 1949 and 1958 and named Royal Charlotte

== HM Excise and Customs ==
- Royal Charlotte, brig, in the service of the Honourable Commissioners for Excise of Scotland. This vessel is variously described as being of 246 tons (bm), and 204 tons (bm). She is mentioned in 1780 as being under Commander Duncan Aire, and having a crew of some 32 men. In 1789, a Charles Elder was appointed captain of the excise cutter Royal Charlotte on Aire's death on board while at Cromarty Bay. With the outbreak of war, the brig Royal Charlotte, Captain Charles Elder, 60 men, 14 × 9 & 6-pounder guns + 4 × 18-pounder carronades + 6 swivel guns, received a letter of marque dated 15 April 1793. That month the revenue cutter Royal Charlotte captured and sent into Leith the French 6-gun privateer Republicain, of 37 men. In 1797, Royal Charlotte escorted into Leith a large Spanish merchant brig, prize to the privateer Breadalbane. With the resumption of war in 1803, Royal Charlotte received a new letter of marque, this one dated 6 July 1803. Her captain was still Charles Elder, but her armament was now 10 × 6-pounder guns.
- Royal Charlotte, ship of 392 tons, Captain Andrew Ramsey, 35 men, 16 × 12-pounder guns, received a letter of marque dated 15 October 1810.

== HM hired ships ==
References exist to hired armed vessels serving the Royal Navy.

- Hired armed ship Royal Charlotte, of 20 guns, was at the Battle of Porto Praya in 1781, where she had one man killed and four wounded. Earlier, she had served as part of the squadron defending Jersey.
- Royal Charlotte (transport) was at Montevideo in 1806 as part of Sir Home Riggs Popham's invasion of the Rio de la Plata. She was lost during a gale on 10 March 1807.

== Shore establishment ==
There were two Royal Navy wireless stations doing SIGINT work in West Germany after World War II, HMS Royal Albert at Cuxhaven, early 1950s, and HMS Royal Charlotte at Kiel, later 1950s.

== See also ==
- Royal Charlotte (ship)
- Royal Charlotte (East Indiaman)
- HMS Queen Charlotte
