= HMS Beelzebub (1813) =

History

United Kingdom
- Name: HMS Beelzebub
- Namesake: Beelzebub
- Ordered: 30 March 1812
- Builder: William Taylor, Bideford
- Laid down: November 1812
- Launched: 30 July 1813
- Honours and awards: Naval General Service Medal with clasp "Algiers"
- Fate: Broken up September 1820

General characteristics
- Class & type: Vesuvius-class bomb vessel
- Tons burthen: 3341/94 (bm)
- Length: Overall:108 ft 2 in (33.0 m); Keel:84 ft 2 3/8 in (25.7 m)
- Beam: 27 ft 3 3/4 in (8.3 m)
- Depth of hold: 12 ft 11 3/4 in (4.0 m)
- Armament: Upper deck: 8 × 24-pounder carronades + 2 × 6-pounder guns; Mortars: 1 × 10 in (0.25 m) + 1 × 13 in (0.33 m)

HMS Beelzebub (or Belzebub) was a mortar vessel of the Royal Navy launched on 30 July 1813, and put into in ordinary. In 1816 she was put into service to participate in a naval campaign. On her return in 1817 she was again put into ordinary. The Navy had her broken up in 1820.

== Career ==
In 1816 Beelzebub was taken out of ordinary, and Commander William Kempthorne was appointed on 2 July 1816 to command her.

Beelzebub took part in Lord Exmouth's punitive expedition against the Dey of Algiers. She participated, on 27 August 1816, in the bombardment of Algiers (1816). During the bombardment Kempthorne commanded the division of bombs vessels. Beelzebub's large mortar fired once in every ten minutes. The mortar and rocket boats between them set all the vessels in the harbour on fire and the fire spread to the arsenal on the mole. Beelzebub had one man killed and two wounded in the bombardment. (Note: A first-class share of the prize money was worth £1068 11s 6¼d; a sixth class share was worth £4 10s 2½d.)

Two days after the battle Kempthorne was appointed acting captain on HMS Queen Charlotte. His first lieutenant on Beelzebub was Lieutenant George Pierce. Beelzebub was placed in ordinary at Plymouth in 1817. The Admiralty planned to have her repaired, but then she was broken up on 23 September 1820.

In 1847 the Admiralty authorised the award of the Naval General Service Medal with clasp "Algiers" to all surviving claimants from the battle.
