= Royal Charlotte (ship) =

Since the 1760s, there have been numerous vessels named Royal Charlotte, for Charlotte of Mecklenburg-Strelitz, consort of King George III.

- Muster rolls exist for a number of vessels that participated in the Atlantic slave trade. The vessels sailed from Bristol to West Africa (primarily to the Bights of Benin and Bonny), where they picked up slaves for sale in the Caribbean. The rolls exist for 1763, 1767, 1783 to 1789, and 1793. The slaves were delivered to Antigua, Grenada (417 slaves delivered), Jamaica (377 slaves delivered), St Vincent (420 slaves delivered), and Tobago (450-60 slaves purchased). One vessel sailed to West Africa for hardwoods and then returned directly to Bristol. In 1793 the French captured a Royal Charlotte while she was on her way to West Africa, war with Britain having broken out.
- Between 1793 and 1810, six apparently different vessels named Royal Charlotte received letters of marque. The four that did not belong to the Excise and Customs service were:

- Royal Charlotte (1774 ship), launched at Bombay in 1774 and destroyed in an explosion in 1797.
- Ship of 342 tons (bm), Captain Thomas Bruce, 23 men, 16 × 12-pounder and 6 × 4-pounder guns (LoM dated 13 February 1801)
- Brig of 261 tons (bm), Captain Alexander Morris, 30 men, 16 × 6- & 8-pounder guns (LoM dated 15 September 1807)
- Cutter of 137 tons (bm), Captain Thomas Robertson, 40 men, 2 × 4-pounder and 8 × 9-pounder guns + four swivels (LoM dated 20 May 1808)

- Royal Charlotte, of the Excise for Scotland, in 1799 was responsible for patrolling from St Abb's Head to Caithness. She was of 227 tons (bm) and carried 18 guns. She had a crew of 60 men under the command of Charles Elder.
- Royal Charlotte (1819 ship) carried convicts from Britain to Australia. She wrecked in 1825.

== See also ==
- HMS Royal Charlotte
- Royal Charlotte (East Indiaman)
- HMS Queen Charlotte
