= HMS Queen Charlotte =

Four ships of the Royal Navy have been named HMS Queen Charlotte after Charlotte, queen consort of King George III of the United Kingdom.

- The first HMS Queen Charlotte (1790) was a first rate of 100 guns, built at Chatham and launched in 1790. She took part in several actions against the French navy, and flew the flag of Admiral Alexander Hood, 1st Viscount Bridport, during the Battle of Groix. She caught fire and sank on 17 March 1800.
- The second HMS Queen Charlotte (1810) was a 104-gun first rate, launched in 1810, led the Bombardment of Algiers on 27 August 1816, was renamed Excellent in 1859 and sold in 1892.
- The third Queen Charlotte (1810 ship) was a ship-sloop constructed for the Upper Canada Provincial Marine on the Great Lakes. The ship was commissioned in 1813 into the Royal Navy and the United States captured her on 10 September 1813 following the Battle of Lake Erie. The United States Navy commissioned her but laid her up and sold her into commercial service in 1825. Her owners finally abandoned her in 1844.
- The fourth Queen Charlotte was originally the 98-gun second rate Boyne, renamed in 1859 and sold in 1861.

== HMCS Queen Charlotte ==
HMCS Queen Charlotte is the Royal Canadian Naval Reserve Division in Charlottetown, Prince Edward Island, Canada. First commissioned as a tender to HMCS Stadacona in 1941 it was later decommissioned and recommissioned as an independent shore establishment in 1942. She was later paid off in 1964 but then recommissioned in 1994.

== Sierra Leone colonial vessel of war Queen Charlotte ==
Following her seizure of the French ship Le Louis, a ship engaged in the slave trade, the Vice Admiralty Court declared the French ship and its cargo forfeit. However, when this was taken to appeal at the High Court of Admiralty, the judge William Scott overturned the judgement, saying that the way Le Louis had been stopped and boarded was illegal as "No nation can exercise a right of visitation and search on the common and unappropriated parts of the sea, save only on the belligerent claim." He accepted that this would constitute a serious impediment to the suppression of the slave trade, but argued that this should be remedied through international treaties rather than Naval officers exceeding what they were permitted to do.

== See also ==
- Hired armed cutter Queen Charlotte which served the Royal Navy during the Napoleonic Wars and was involved in an heroic single ship action against a larger French vessel.
