= Bombardment (disambiguation) =

Bombardment is an attack by artillery fire directed against fortifications, or by aircraft dropping bombs. It may also refer to:

Specific bombardments

- Bombardment of Alexandria (1882)
- Bombardment of Algiers (disambiguation) (several)
- Bombardment of Brussels (1695)
- Bombardment of Curaçao (1942)
- Bombardment of Fort Stevens (1942)
- Bombardment of Genoa (1684)
- Bombardment of Kagoshima (1863)
- Bombardment of Madras (1914)
- Bombardment of Papeete (1914)
- Bombardment of Punta Sombrero (1847)
- Bombardment of Shimonoseki (1863/64)
- Bombardment of Tourane (1847)
- Bombardment of Tourane (1856)

Other meanings

- Kinetic bombardment in space warfare
- Naval bombardment
- Late Heavy Bombardment, a period in cosmology
- Bombardment, a process in the manufacture of neon tubes
- A variant of dodgeball in the Simpsons episode "My Fair Laddy"

See also

- Area bombardment
- Bomb
