= Royal Charlotte (East Indiaman) =

Four vessels named Royal Charlotte, some for Charlotte of Mecklenburg-Strelitz, consort of King George III, sailed as East Indiamen for the British East India Company (EIC) between 1762 and 1815:

- Royal Charlotte (1761 EIC ship) made three trips to India and the Red Sea for the EIC between February 1762 and July 1770. In 1773 she was sold to the French East India Company.
- Royal Charlotte (1771 EIC ship) made five voyages to India and China between February 1772 and June 1787; in 1781 she was present at the Battle of Porto Praya. She was sold in 1787 for breaking up.
- Royal Charlotte (1789 EIC ship) made two trips for the EIC between January 1790 and September 1794. The Admiralty bought her in 1795 and renamed her HMS Malabar. Malabar foundered in 1796.
- Royal Charlotte (1796 EIC ship) made eight trips to the Far East for the EIC between August 1796 and August 1815. She was sold for breaking up in 1816.

== See also ==
- HMS Royal Charlotte
- Royal Charlotte (ship)
