= Nicolaas Baur =

Dutch painter (1767–1820)

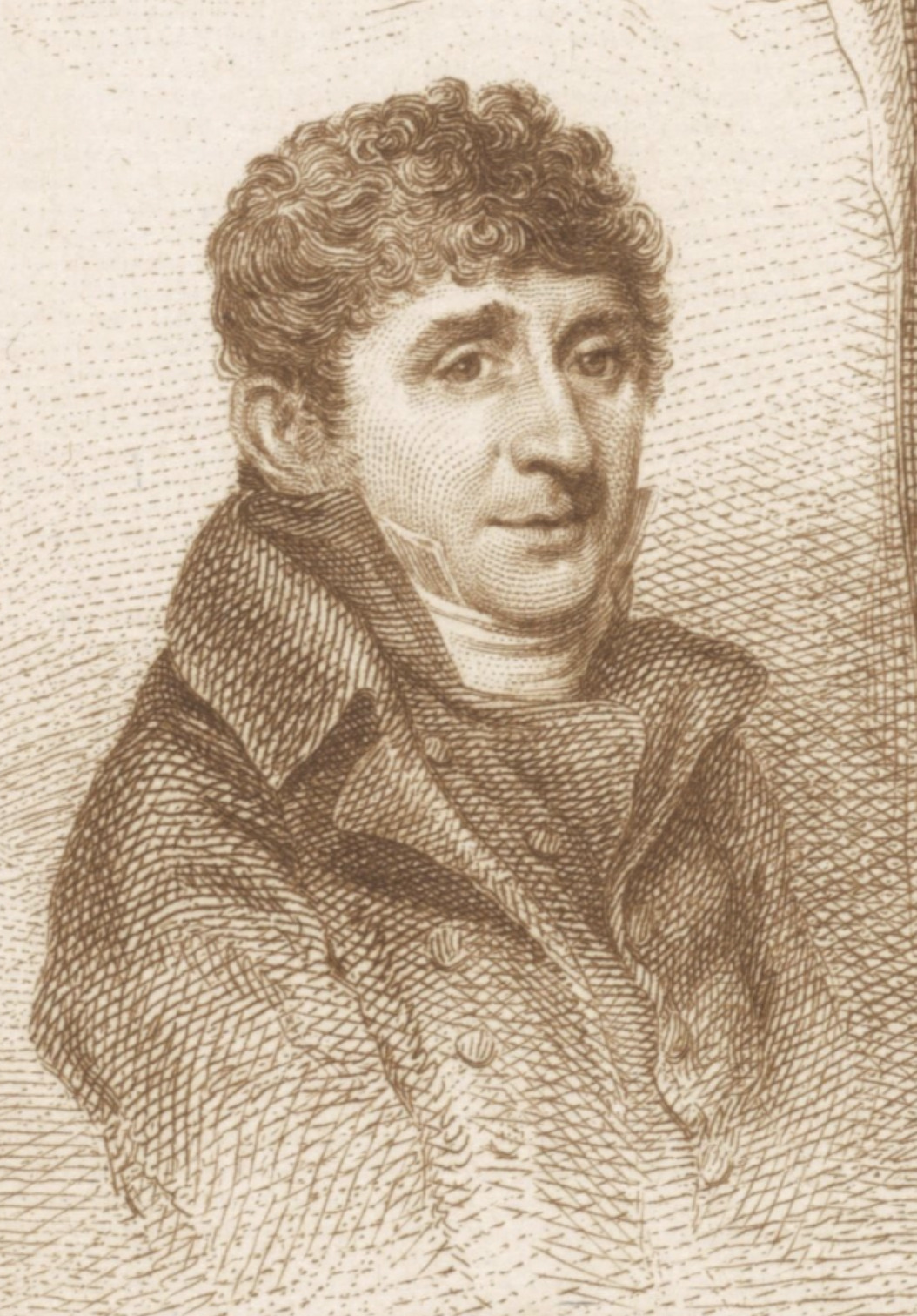
Portrait of Baur by Willem van Senus

Nicolaas Baur (12 September 1767 – 28 March 1820) was a Dutch painter who specialised in marine art.

== Life ==
Baur was born at Harlingen in 12 September 1767, the son of the portrait painter Hendricus Antonius Baur. He painted landscapes, views of cities, and moonlight and winter scenes; he was particularly successful in marine subjects. Considered one of the best Dutch marine artists of the early 19th century, he died in Harlingen on 28 March 1820. Baur became a correspondent of the Royal Institute, predecessor to the Royal Netherlands Academy of Arts and Sciences in 1809.

== Gallery ==
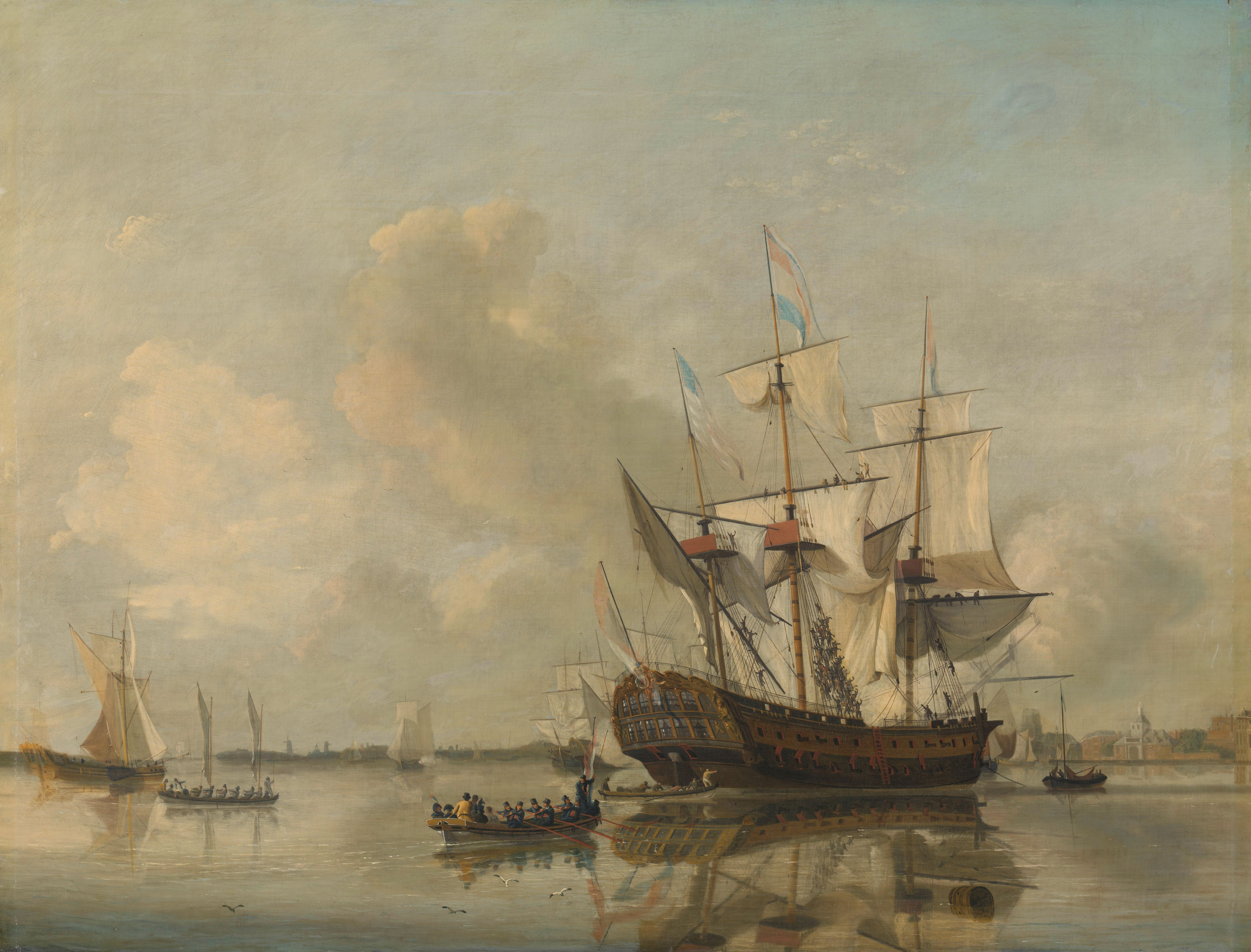
The Dutch frigate 'Rotterdam' on the Maas off Rotterdam (1807)

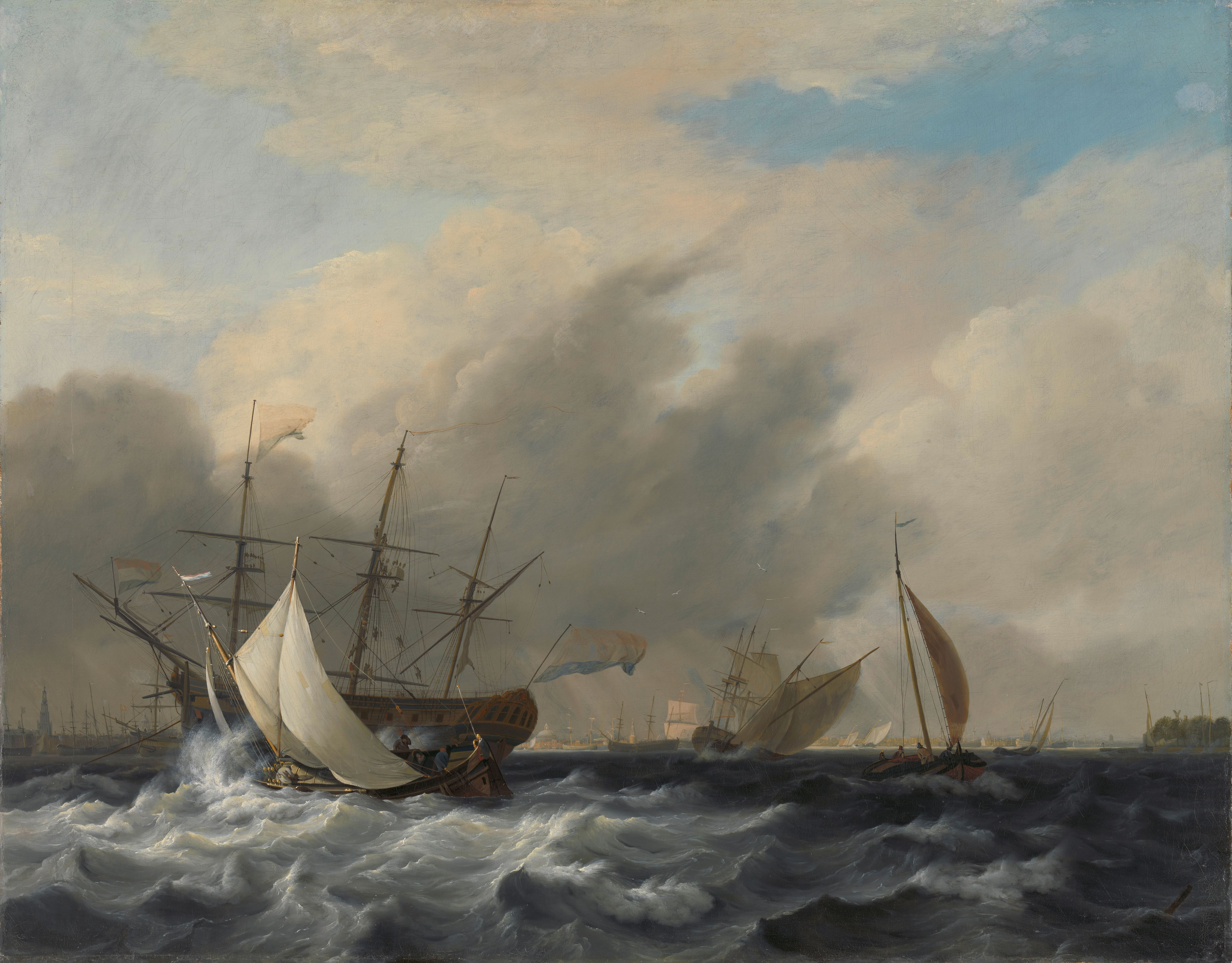
The Dutch warship 'Amsterdam' off the Westerlaag on the IJ off Amsterdam (1807)

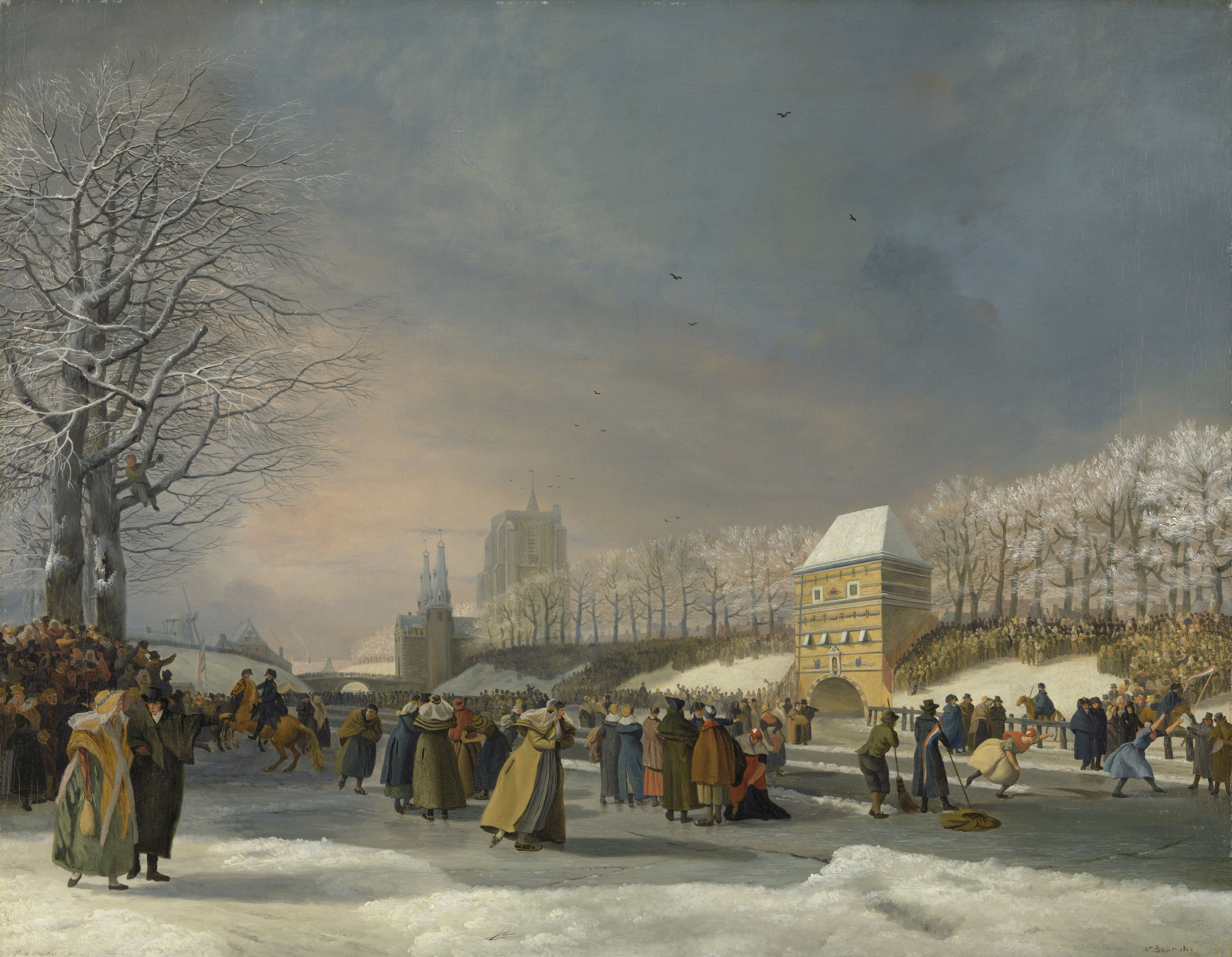
Women’s Skating Competition on the Stadsgracht in Leeuwarden, 21 January 1809 (1809)

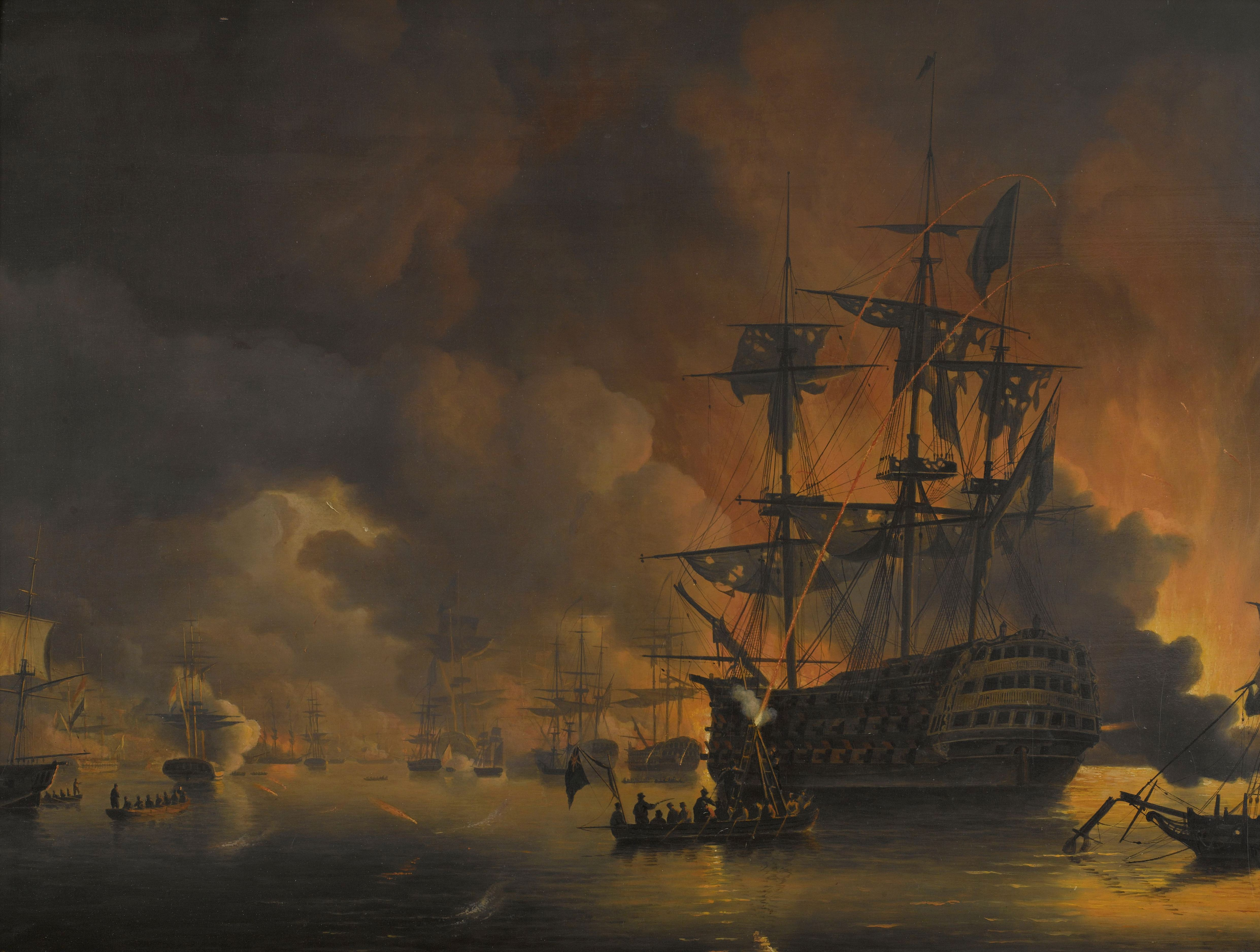
The fire on the wharves of Algiers, shortly after the beginning of the bombardment by the Anglo-Dutch fleet, 27 August 1816 (1816–1820)

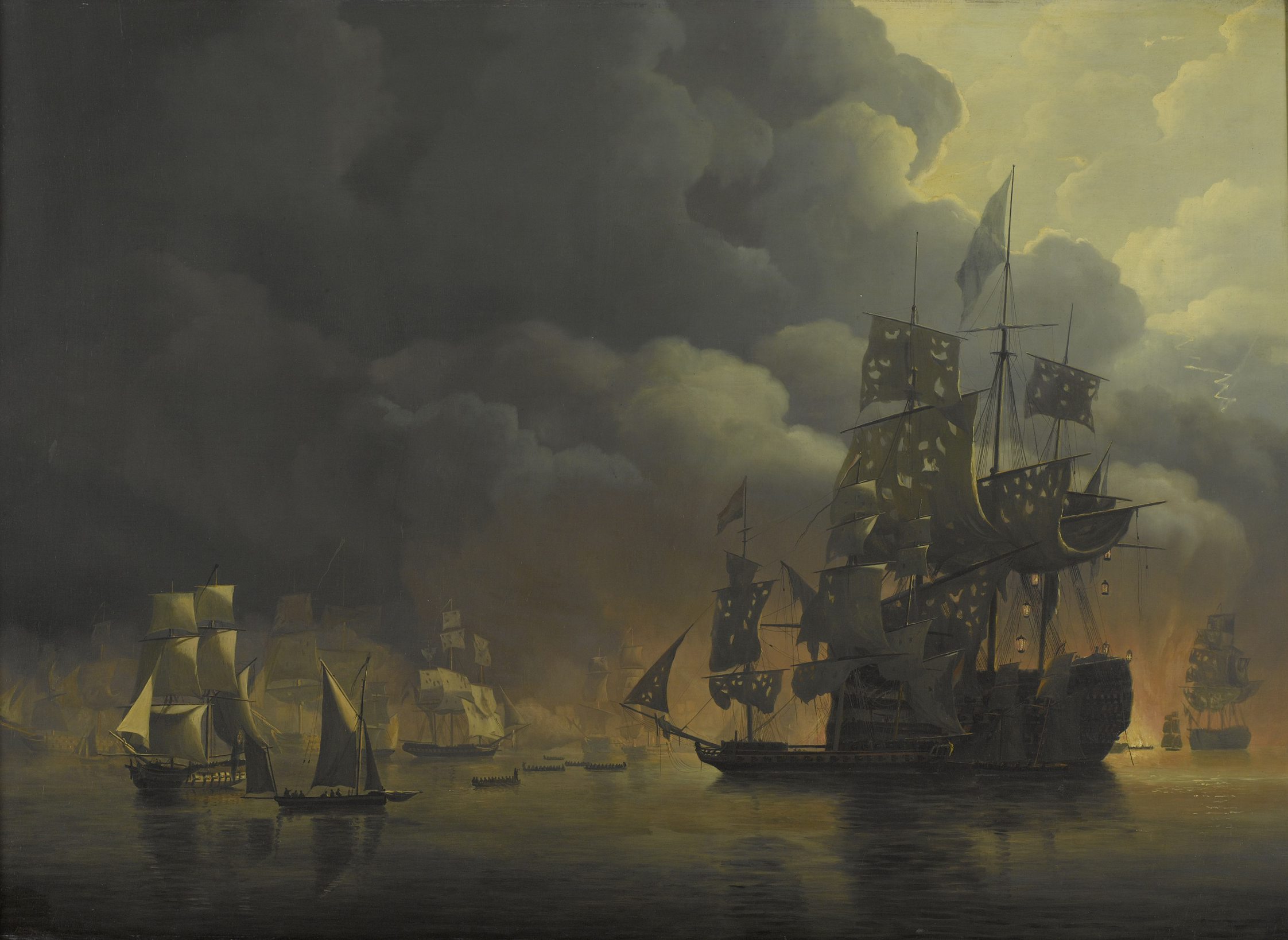
The Anglo-Dutch Fleet under Lord Exmouth and Vice Admiral Jonkheer Theodorus Frederik van Capellen placing the Algerian fortifications out of action, 27 August 1816 (1818)

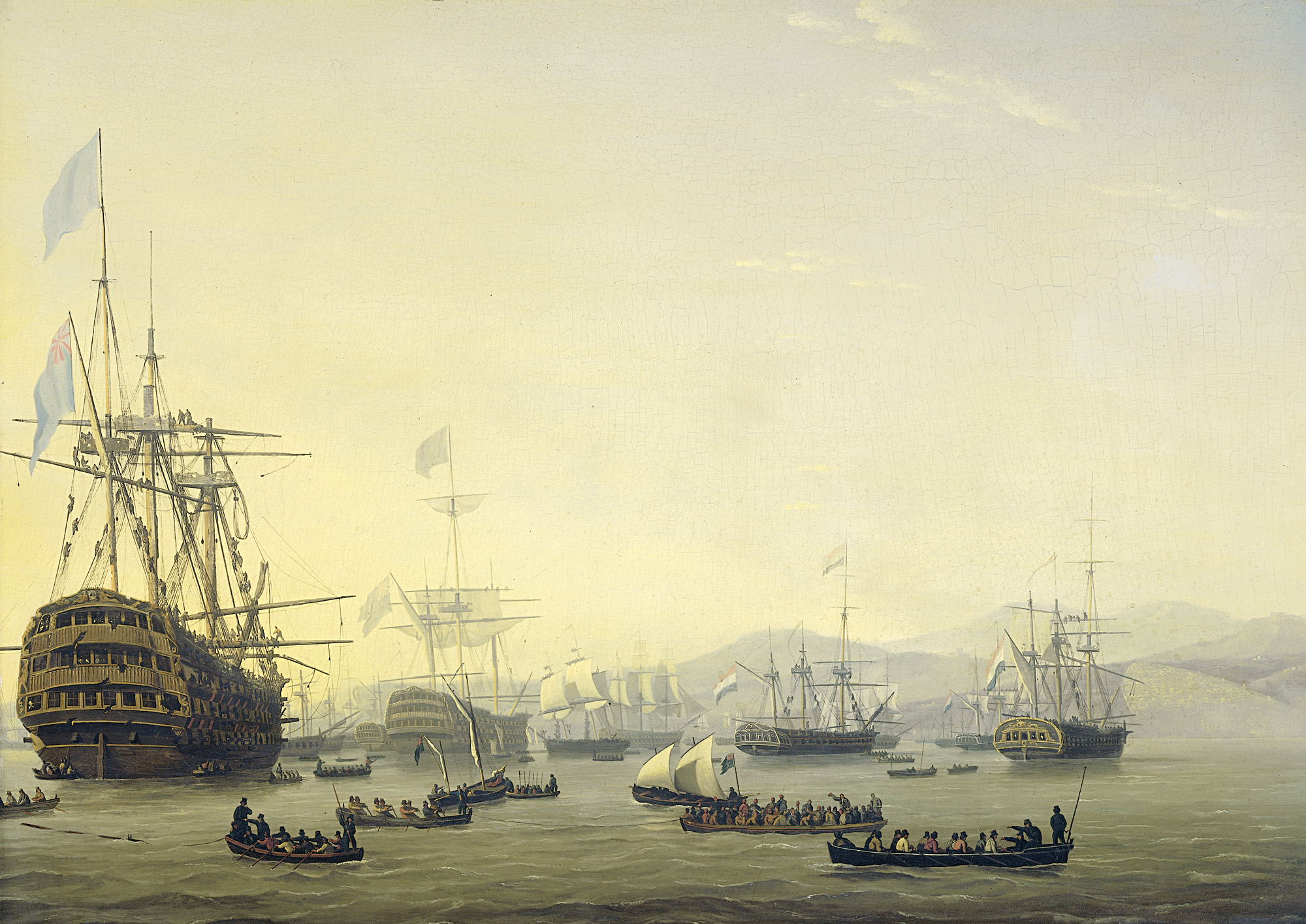
Council of War on board the 'Queen Charlotte', commanded by Lord Exmouth, prior to the Bombardment of Algiers, 26 August 1816 (1818)

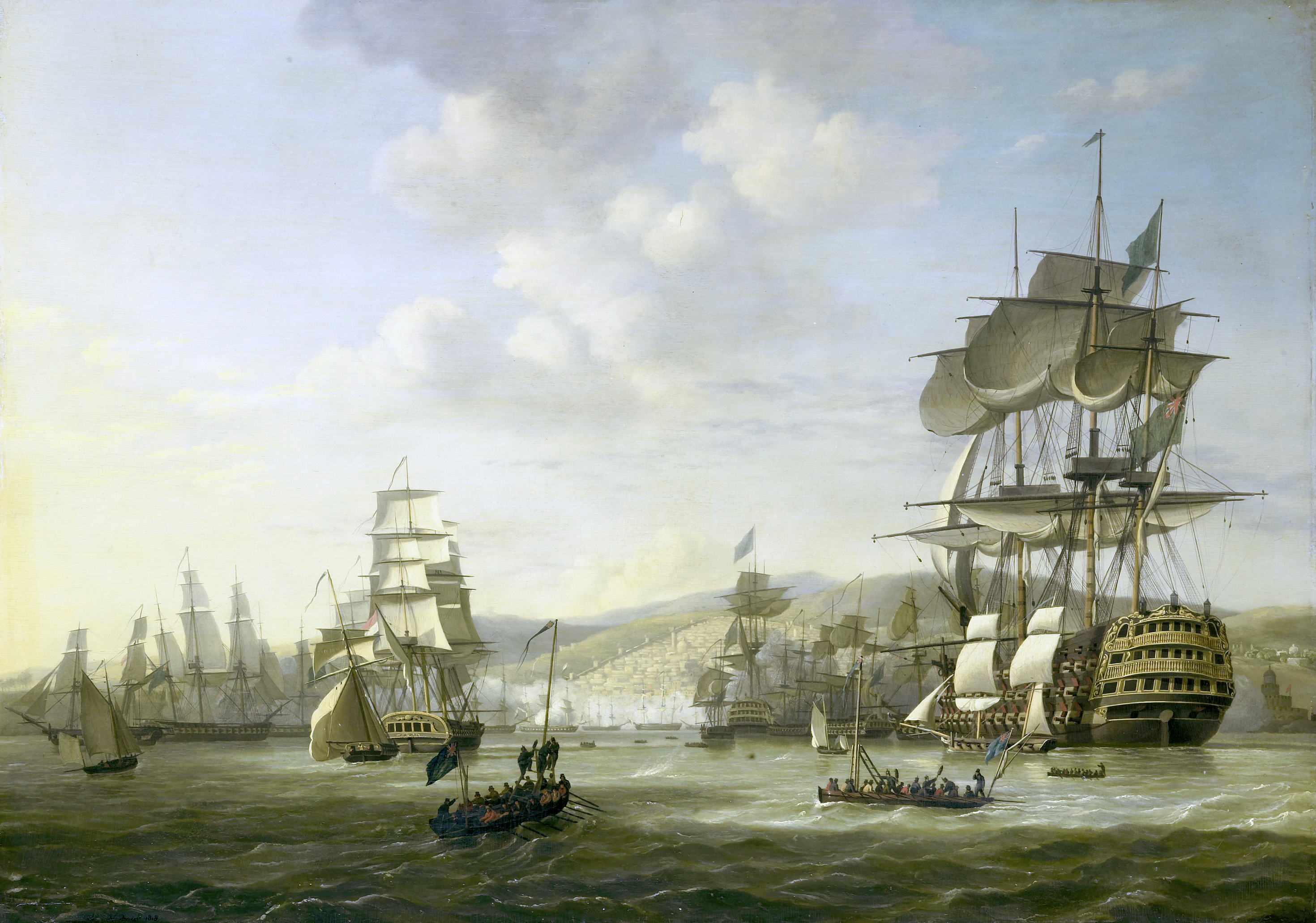
The Anglo-Dutch fleet in the Bay of Algiers in support of the ultimatum for the release of captured sailors and fishermen, 26 August 1816 (1818)
