= Matilda Newport =

Liberian colonist and folk hero

Matilda Newport (c. 1795–1837) was an Americo-Liberian colonist and folk hero. She is known for her actions in 1822 when she is alleged to have defended the settlement Cape Mesurado with a cannon she lit from her pipe. She is a controversial figure in light of the tensions between Americo-Liberians and native Liberians. The historical accuracy of the account has been challenged. A national holiday in her honor, Matilda Newport Day, was celebrated annually on 1 December from 1916 until it was abolished in 1980.

== Biography ==
Matilda was born in the United States circa 1795 (possibly Georgia). She married Thomas Spencer, becoming Matilda Spencer. At the age of 25 she sailed to Liberia with her husband on the ship Elizabeth. They arrived on 30 September 1820 and settled in Cape Mesurado.

Newport is principally known for her actions on 1 December 1822 defending the colonial settlement Cape Mesurado during the Battle of Fort Hill. An American Colonization Society representative had acquired the land through gunboat diplomacy, displacing the indigenous Dei people. During one of two attacks on the settlement by the Dei, Bassa, and Gola, Newport noticed that the cannoneers were either dead or wounded. She used a hot coal from her pipe to light the fuse of a cannon. The resulting explosion deterred the advance of the African warriors and changed the course of the battle.

Newport's husband died, probably in one of the conflicts. Sometime after 1822, she married again to Ralph Newport. He died in a canoeing accident in 1836. Matilda Newport died of pleurisy in Monrovia in 1837.

== Legacy and historicity ==
Newport's role in the 1822 battle was not initially considered particularly significant, but grew over time in oral histories. In 1916 the Liberian legislature designated 1 December as Matilda Newport Day. Until its abolishment, the annual celebration included a grand ball, speeches, parades, and reenactments. She was commemorated with a Liberian postage stamp in 1947. A bronze plaque at the Centennial Pavilion in Monrovia depicts Newport with the cannon. Monrovia also has a monument dedicated to her and a street and a high school bear her name.

As criticism of Americo-Liberian rule grew in the 1960s, Newport's role in Liberian history was no longer seen as admirable. Following the military coup in 1980, Samuel Doe abolished Matilda Newport Day. Historians have questioned the veracity of the account of Newport's actions. None of the accounts of the battle mention women participating the colony's defense. The first source to acknowledge Newport's role appeared in 1854.
