= Bombardment of Algiers =

Bombardment of Algiers may refer to:

- 1st Bombardment of Algiers (1682) by a French squadron
- 2nd Bombardment of Algiers (1683) by a French squadron
- 3rd Bombardment of Algiers (1688) by a French squadron
- Bombardment of Algiers (1770) by a Danish-Norwegian squadron
- Bombardment of Algiers (1783) by a Spanish fleet
- Bombardment of Algiers (1784) by an allied Spanish, Maltese, Neapolitan, and Portuguese fleet
- Bombardment of Algiers (1816) by an Anglo-Dutch fleet
- Bombardment of Algiers (1824) by a British squadron
- Bombardment of Algiers (painting), a painting by Thomas Luny, depicting the 1816 Bombardment
