= Cape Mesurado =

Headland in Liberia

- Cape
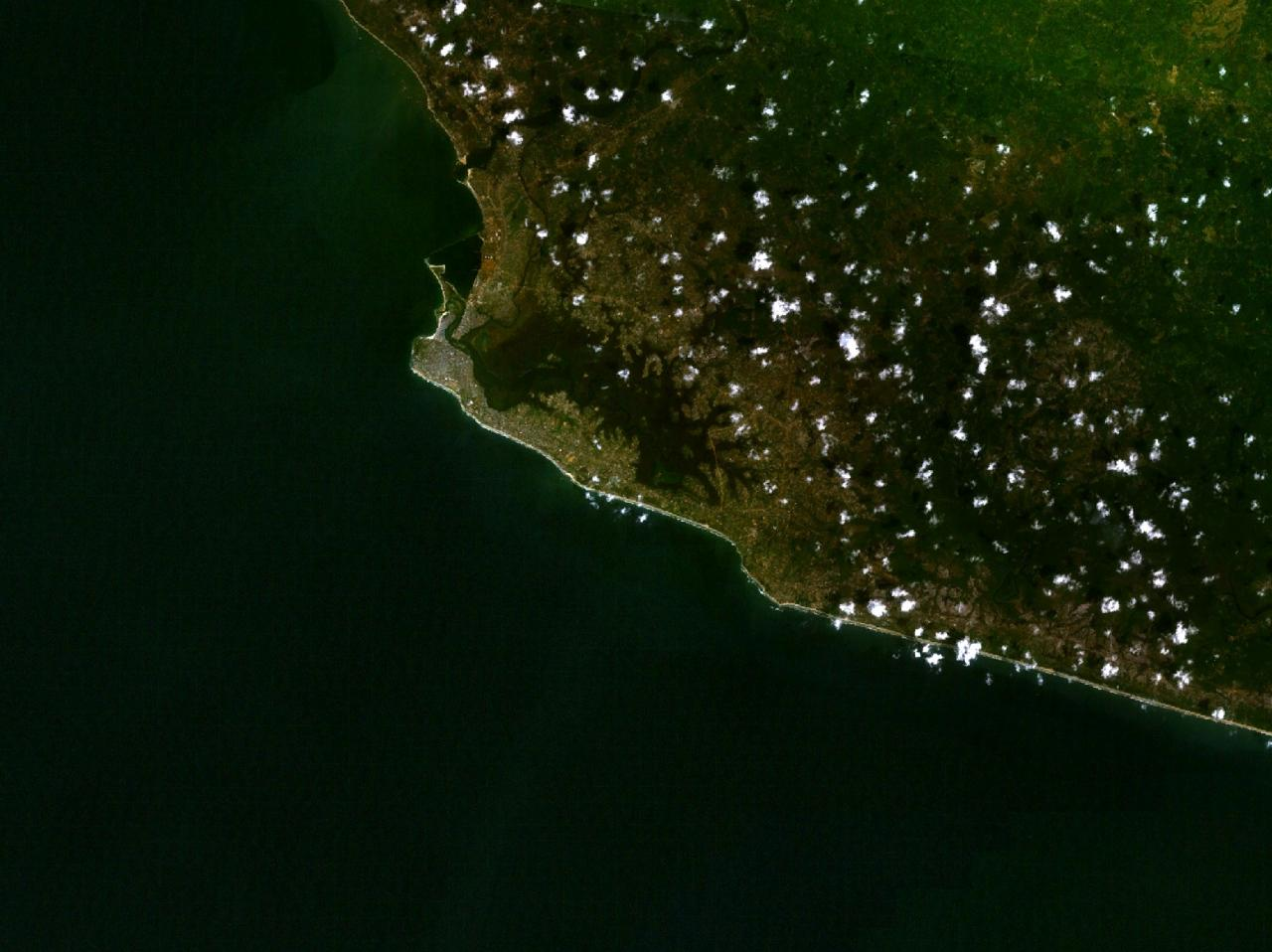

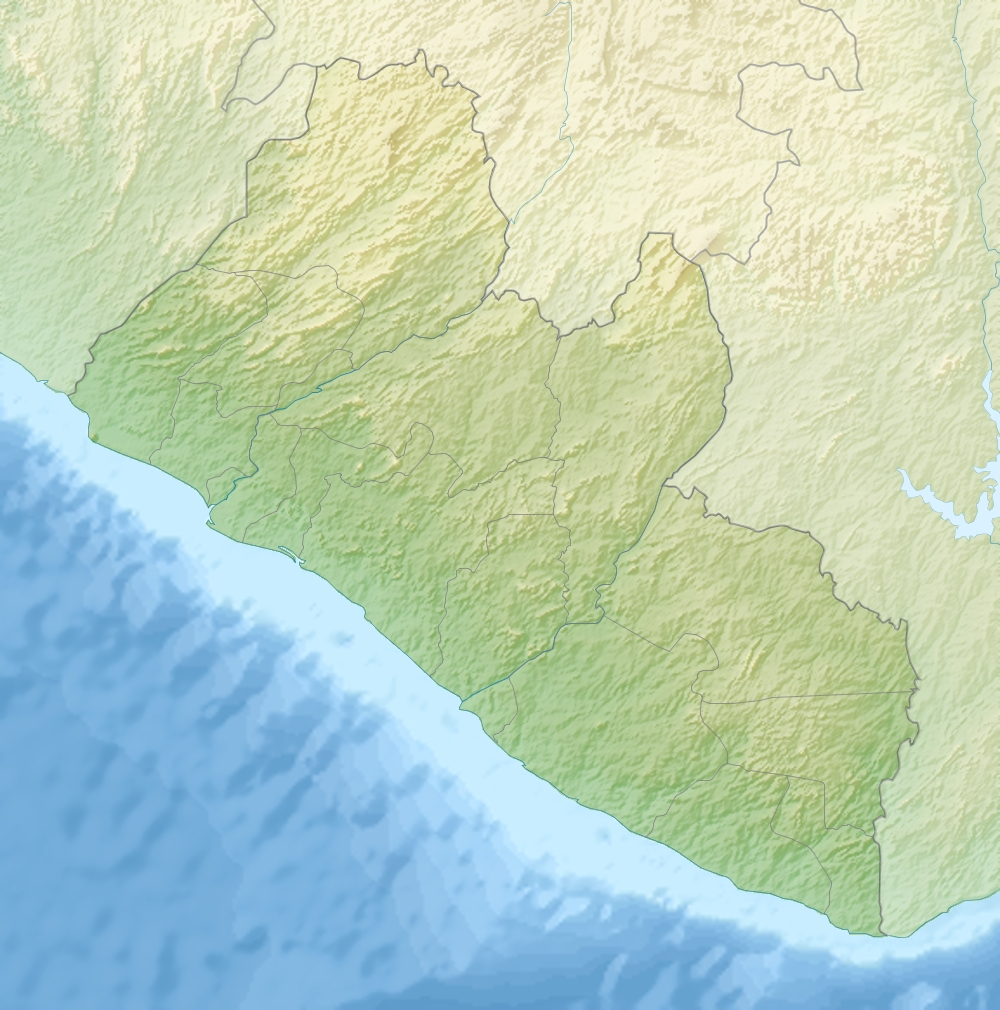
- Location within Liberia
- Coordinates: 6.307998768°N 10.804663448°W
- Location: Monrovia, Liberia

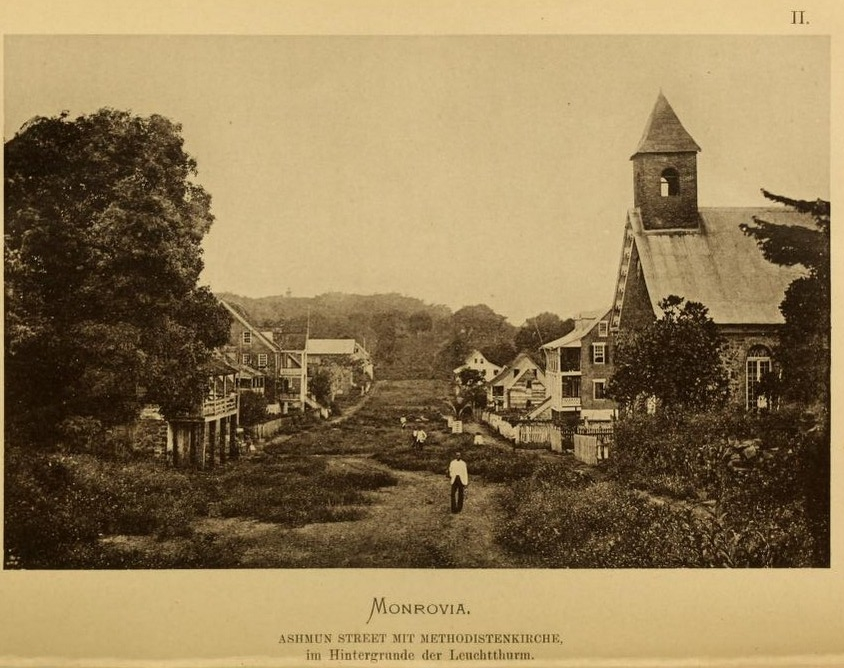
The Cape Mesurado lighthouse.

Cape Mesurado, also called Cape Montserrado, is a headland on the coast of Liberia near the capital Monrovia and the mouth of the Saint Paul River. It was named Cape Mesurado by Portuguese sailors in the 1560s. It is the promontory on which African-American settlers established the city now called Monrovia on 25 April 1822.

There is a lighthouse on Cape Mesurado, located in the Mamba Point neighborhood of Monrovia and in the cape's northwestern portion, that was established in 1855. It is currently inactive, although the Liberian government is seeking financial assistance to restore and reactivate the lighthouse.

== History ==
=== Slave trading post ===
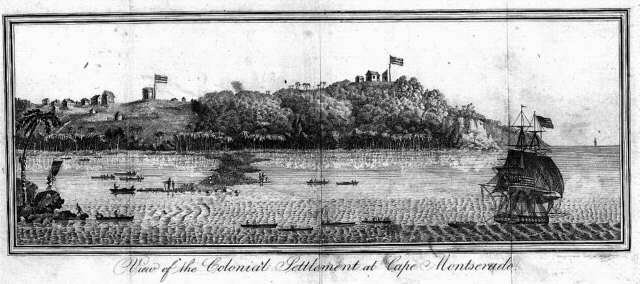
Colonial settlement at Cape Mesurado

Because Cape Mesurado was being used as a base for the illegal slave trade, in 1815 Governor William Maxwell of Sierra Leone sent an armed force there to interfere with it, seizing ships and merchandise and rescuing enslaved Africans who were working in the factories there. For their crimes, the factory owners, Robert Bostock and John McQueen, were sentenced to fourteen years transportation to New South Wales by the Vice admiralty court.

Interference with the illegal slave trade was furthered the following year, when HMS Queen Charlotte of the British West Africa Squadron seized the Le Louis, which was suspected of being engaged in the slave trade.

Settlers had previously landed at Sherbro Island in Sierra Leone, but they were experiencing a high death rate there due to the island's swampy, unhealthy conditions, so, in 1821, the American Colonization Society dispatched a representative, Dr. Eli Ayers, to purchase land farther south down the coast from Sierra Leone that would provide better living conditions.

=== Foundation of Liberia ===
With the aid of Robert F. Stockton, a U.S. naval officer, Ayers sought out land to establish a new colony. Stockton led negotiations with leaders of the Dei and Bassa peoples who lived in the area of Cape Mesurado. At first, the local ruler, Zolu Duma (King Peter), was reluctant to surrender their peoples' land to the strangers, but he was forcefully persuaded (some accounts claim at gunpoint) to sell them a "36 mile long and 3 mile wide" strip of coastal land, in exchange for trade goods, supplies, weapons, and rum worth approximately $300 (a considerable sum at the time).

The Cape Mesurado colony faced many of the same challenges that had faced the previous colony at Sherbro Island: scarce supplies and swampy, unhealthy conditions. The new colony’s Americo-Liberian residents (who had been slaves or the children of former slaves in the United States before their emigration to Africa) were also sporadically attacked by local tribes who resented the newcomers’ efforts to put an end to the slave trade. Led by Lott Carey and Elijah Johnson, the Americo-Liberians organized a defense against local attacks, rejecting an offer of British military assistance that would have required them to hoist the Union Jack on Cape Mesurado. During the Battle of Fort Hill on 1 December 1822, a colonist named Matilda Newport is supposed to have repelled an attack by lighting a cannon with an ember from her pipe. To commemorate her action, a local holiday, called “Matilda Newport Day,” was established in 1916. (It was abolished in 1980 by a government that came to power in a military coup.)

== Climate ==
Cape Mesurado

Climate chart (precipitation, max. and min. temperature)
J	F	M	A	M	J	J	A	S	O	N	D
16 27 22	72 28 20	73 28 22	169 27 21	329 28 21	636 20 17	590 25 19	475 24 21	692 23 20	516 26 19	247 27 22	110 28 22
- █ Average max. and min. temperatures in °C
- █ Precipitation totals in mm
Imperial conversion
J	F	M	A	M	J	J	A	S	O	N	D
0.6 81 72	2.8 82 68	2.9 82 72	6.7 81 70	13 82 70	25 68 63	23 77 66	19 75 70	27 73 68	20 79 66	9.7 81 72	4.3 82 72
- █ Average max. and min. temperatures in °F
- █ Precipitation totals in inches
