= Thomas Luny =

English painter

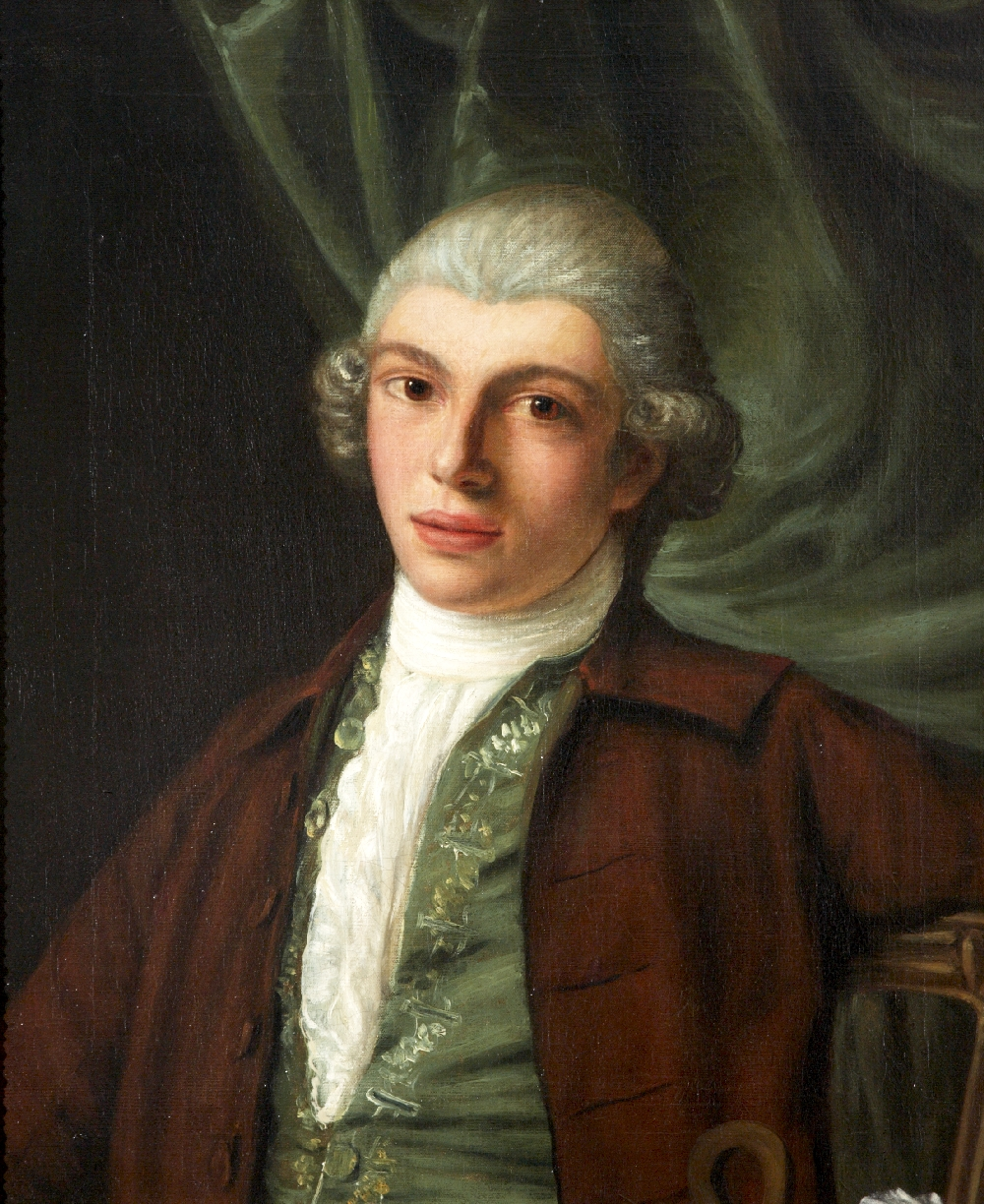
- Self-portrait of Luny
- Born: 1759; Cornwall, England
- Died: 30 September 1837 (aged 77–78); Teignmouth, England
- Known for: Seascapes
- Notable work: Bombardment of Algiers

Thomas Luny (1759 – 30 September 1837) was an English painter who specialised in marine art.

== Life ==
Luny was born in Cornwall, probably at St Ewe, in 1759. At the age of eleven, Luny left Cornwall to live in London. There he became the apprentice of Francis Holman, a marine painter who would have a great and long lasting artistic influence on Luny. Luny remained until 1780 in Holman's London studio, which was first situated in Broad Street, St. George's, and later relocated to Old Gravel Lane.

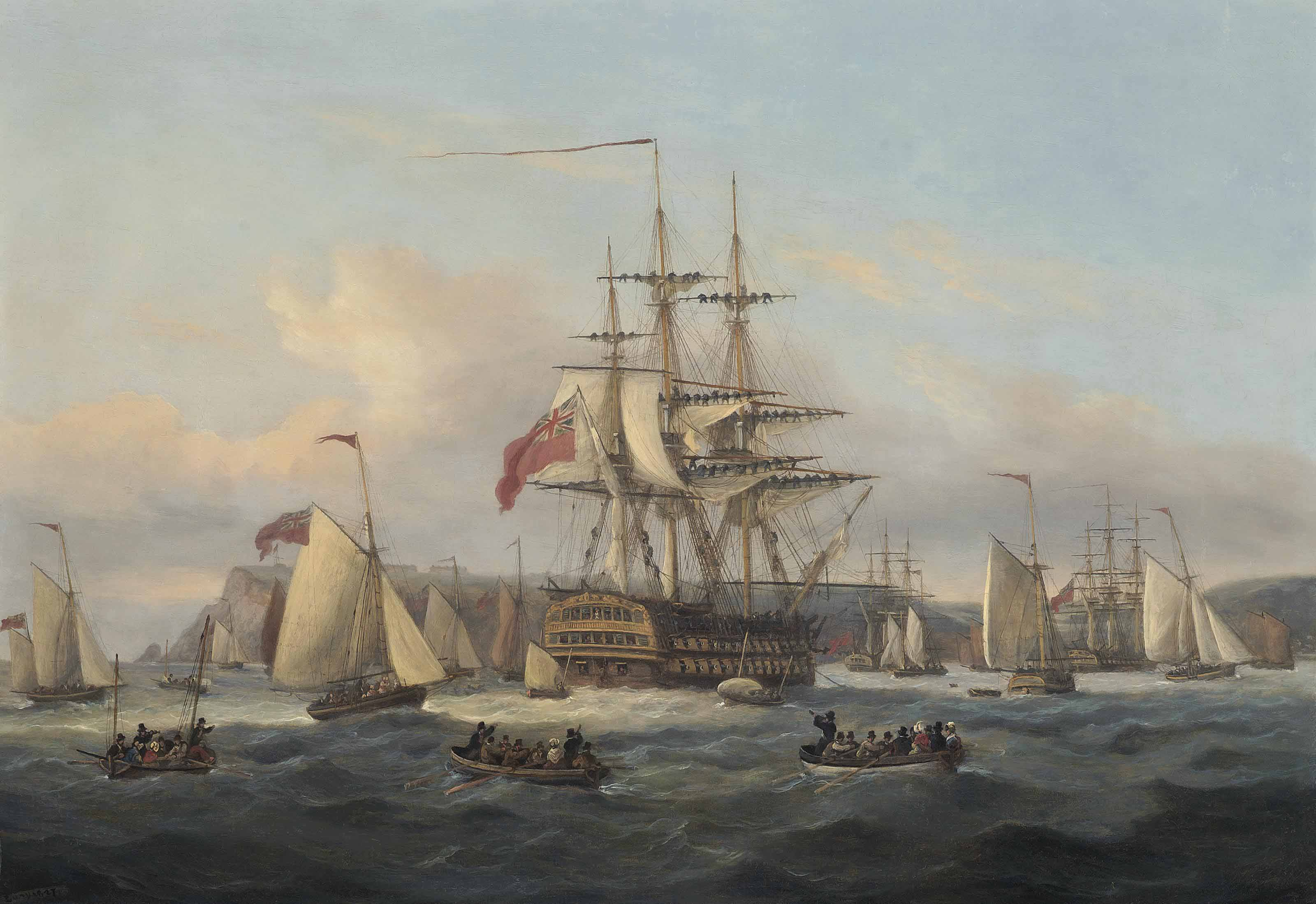
HMS Bellerophon lying at anchor (1827)

In September 1777, Luny left Holman's studio for a while, to journey to France. During this particular expedition, Luny almost certainly strayed from France itself; his first exhibited picture in London, seen at the Society of Artists that same year, was given the title A distant view of the island of Madeira and Porto Santo, suggesting that an engraving had inspired his choice of subject. Similarly, it is unlikely that Luny was on hand for the Battle of the Nile in 1798 and the bombardment of Algiers in 1816, both of which he illustrated with dramatic atmosphere and credible realism.

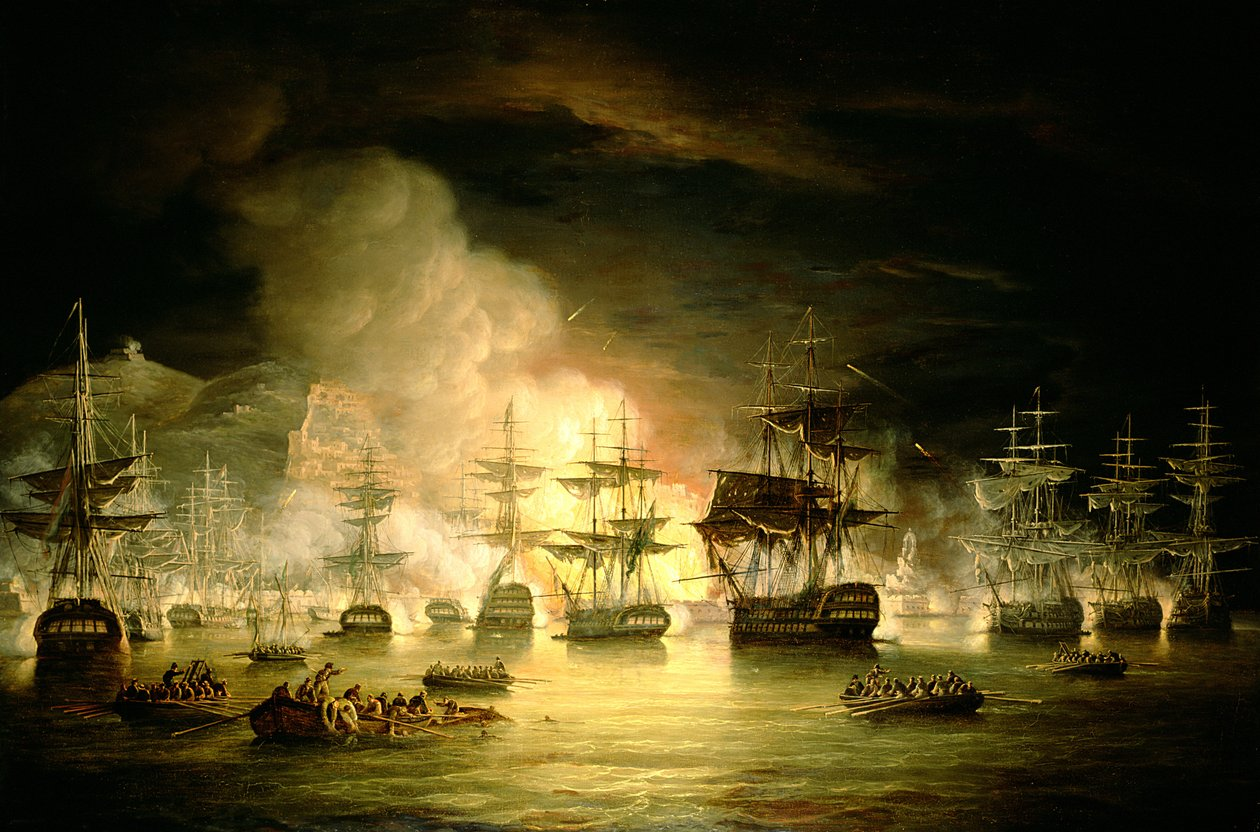
Bombardment of Algiers

Luny left Holman's studio in 1780 and would later move to Leadenhall Street in 1783. It was around this time that Luny was frequently exhibiting at the Royal Academy, in a total of twenty-nine exhibitions between 1780 and 1802. In Leadenhall Street, Luny became acquainted with a "Mr. Merle", a dealer and framer of paintings who promoted Luny's paintings for over twenty years, to great success. Luny also found a wealthy source of business in Leadenhall Street, where the East India Company had their headquarters; their officers commissioned many paintings and portraits from Luny. This relationship between the Company and Luny also had several non-monetary benefits for Luny; it seems probable that, considering the great detail and realistic look of many of his sketches of locations such as Naples, Gibraltar, and Charleston, South Carolina, Luny was occasionally invited as a guest on the company's ships on special occasions and voyages.

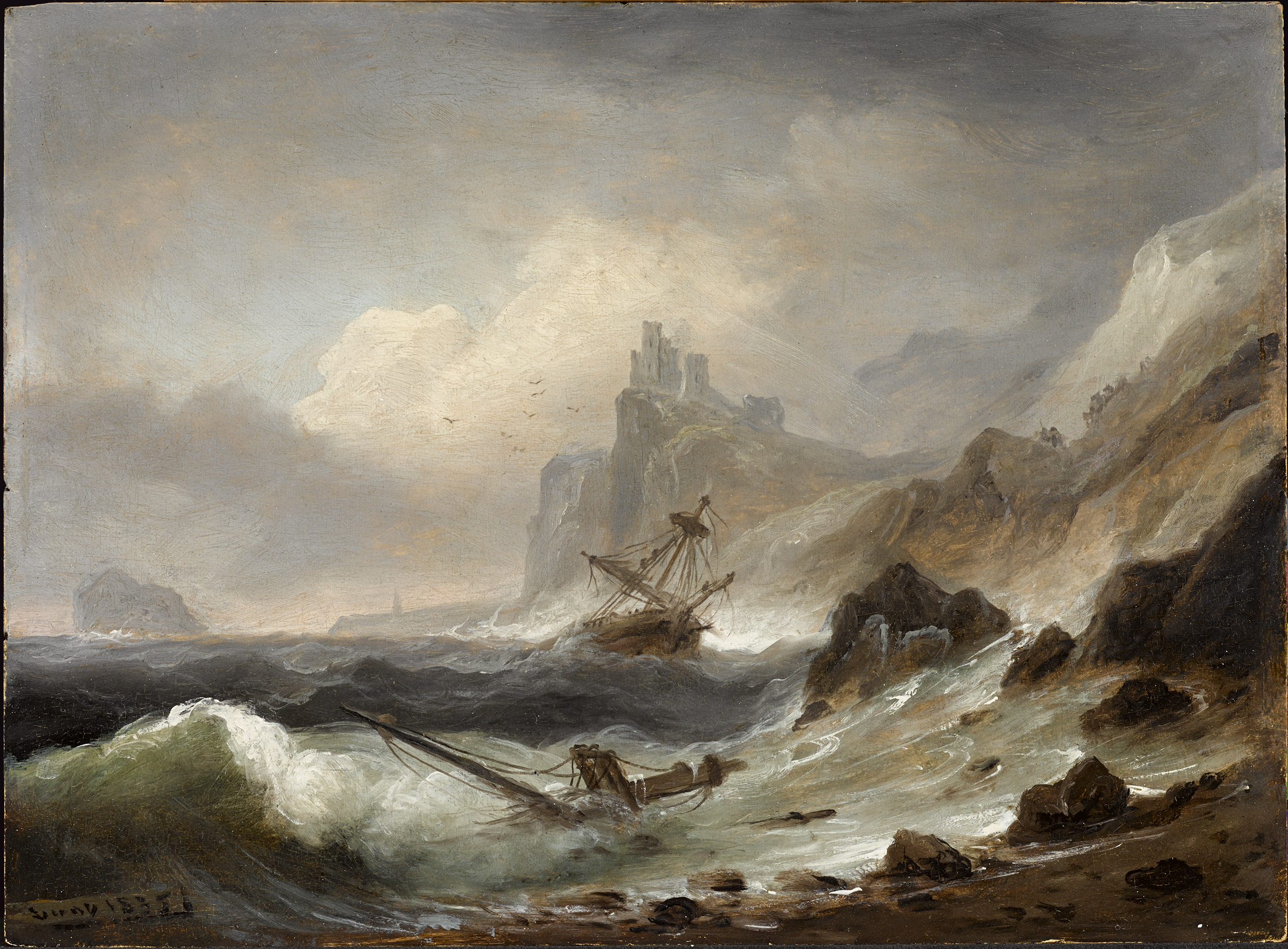
Tantallon Castle and the Bass Rock (1835)

Several years later, in 1807, Luny decided to move again, this time to Teignmouth in Devon. There he received a number of commissions (mostly from ex-mariners, local gentry, and the like), and he continued to be as successful in his work as he had been in London. Luny was by that time suffering with arthritis in both of his hands. This had no obvious impact on the quality or pace of his artistic work. In fact, of his lifetime oeuvre of over 3,000 works, over 2,200 were produced between 1807 and his death. He died on 30 September 1837.

Thomas Luny was buried in the graveyard of St James' Church, the parish church of Teignmouth, alongside his half-brother Captain James Wallace, who had fought at the Battle of Copenhagen under Nelson's command.

Specimens of his work are exhibited at the National Maritime Museum at Greenwich, in the Royal Albert Memorial Museum in Exeter, and at The Mariners' Museum in Newport News, Virginia.
