= Zolu Duma =

Bassa-Dei ruler

Zolu Duma, also known as King Peter, was a Bassa-Dei ruler of the land situated on Bushrod Island. Bushrod Island is in Montserrado County (formerly Cape Mesurado), Liberia. Today, King Peter's Town where his Palace was stationed is in the area of Logan Town on Bushrod Island. Zolu Duma was raised by the Wuling, of the Bassa people, who had gained importance as merchants trading with the Europeans, including slaves. He ruled the Gola and Vai areas in the early 19th century.

In 1822 Zolu Duma met with representatives of the American Colonization Society, including United States naval officer Robert F. Stockton, who wished to purchase land on which to settle African-American emigrants from the United States. Accounts of the meeting stated that Zolu Duma initially agreed to the sale, but tried to back out once he learned that the settlement would endanger the slave trade. Stockton then forced Zolu Duma to cede the land at gunpoint:

Drawing another pistol and levelling at the head of King Peter, and directing him to sit silent until he heard what was to be said, [Stockton] proceeded to say, in the most solemn manner…he had determined that King Peter himself should be the first victim, and that unless he agreed to execute the treaty on the following day his fate was fixed.

Zolu Duma died in 1827. He was succeeded as ruler by his son, Jalla Fingue, who was also known as Prince Peter.

== In literature ==
Zolu Duma appeared as a character in Kwame Kwei-Armah's "King Peter" and Dipika Guha's "Elizabeth," two short plays that premiered at the McCarter Theatre in Princeton, New Jersey, in November 2017 as part of the Princeton & Slavery Project Symposium. He was portrayed by actor Esau Pritchett.
