= Le Louis =

Le Louis was a French ship engaged in the slave trade which was captured by HMS Queen Charlotte, of the British West Africa Squadron on the 11 March 1816. She became the subject of a court case with repercussions for the law of nations.

Le Louis set sail from Martinique for West Africa on 30 January 1816. She was sailing off Cape Mesurado, a place known for its role in the slave trade and which had been raided on the orders of Governor William Maxwell in 1815. After an engagement which led to several deaths amongst both crews, she was captured by the British and taken to Freetown, Sierra Leone.
