= Bombardment of Algiers (painting) =

1820 painting by Thomas Luny

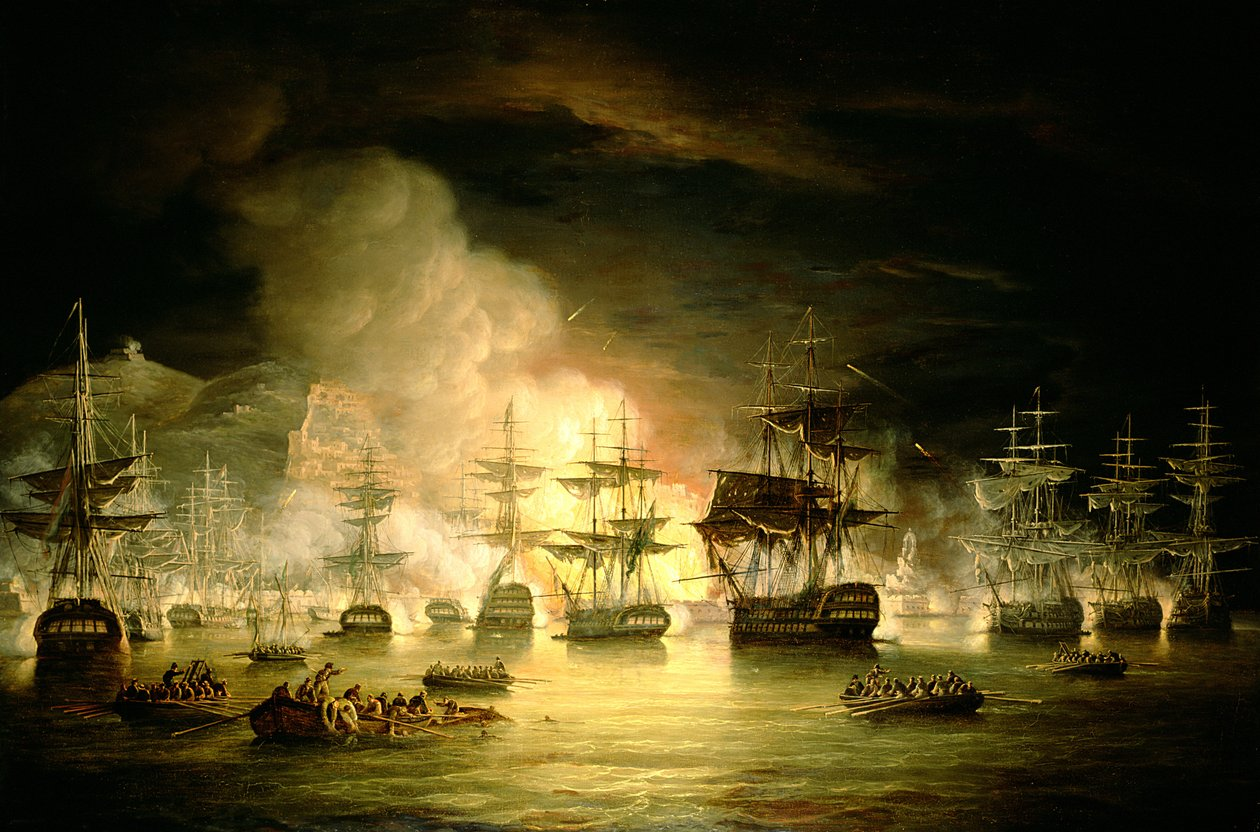
- Artist: Thomas Luny
- Year: 1820
- Medium: Oil-on-canvas
- Dimensions: 122 cm × 183 cm (48 in × 72 in)
- Location: Private collection

Bombardment of Algiers is one of a number of oil-on-canvas paintings by British artist Thomas Luny depicting the heavy bombardment of the harbour of Algiers by a fleet of Anglo-Dutch ships under the command of Admiral Lord Exmouth, and the ensuing destruction. It is signed and dated to 1820 by Luny, four years after the events depicted. It is held in a private collection.

== Background ==
The painting is a portrayal of the Bombardment of Algiers, which took place on 27 August 1816. This campaign was an attempt by the British to end the slavery conducted by the Dey of Algiers, specifically to free the hundreds of Christians that had been enslaved by the Dey. It was the result of the Dey's rejection of previous non-combative negotiations to free these slaves.

The two forces stated in their earlier negotiations that they would not fire the first shot. However, despite the Algerian's plan to board Exmouth's ships in secrecy using small ships, an Algerian ship fired out of line at approximately 3:00 pm, and the Algerian plan was foiled and the battle instigated. After around ten hours, the Algerian fleet were effectively overpowered and subdued by Exmouth's fleet of approximately 28 ships.

Following effective victory, Exmouth dispatched a peace treaty the next day at noon, under the condition that the opposition comply to the terms specified. He expressly stated that if the terms were not agreed with and met, that the combative action would continue. The Dey accepted these terms. However, Exmouth had taken a sizable risk by demanding acceptance by force, because the fleet had actually fired off all of its ammunition.

About a month later, on 24 September, a treaty was signed and sanctioned. This resulted in the freeing of over 1000 Christian slaves, among other things.

== Analysis ==
The painting is a seascape, as the majority of Luny's works were. It specifically depicts a scene of the bombardment wherein British victory is evidently close. Night has fallen, so it would have been several hours into the assault. Many of Exmouth's ships are seen in the middleground, launching their attack on the shoreline defences. In the foreground, there are several small ships, presumably the Algerian boats that were to be employed in the boarding of Exmouth's ships. Far in the background, the silhouette of mountains behind the port, and the clouded night sky can be seen. Little of the actual port can be seen, as it is shrouded by the billowing smoke.

The only source of lighting in the painting comes from the towering inferno in the approximate centre of the piece, behind Exmouth's ships. In the darkness of the night and the long shadows, it creates a Chiaroscuro effect, introducing stark contrast between light and dark. This is accentuated by the pure blackness that surrounds the scene from all sides. This effect is also seen in some of Luny's other paintings, most similarly in his Battle of the Nile.
