= Bombardment of Algiers (1816) =

1816 anti-slavery conflict

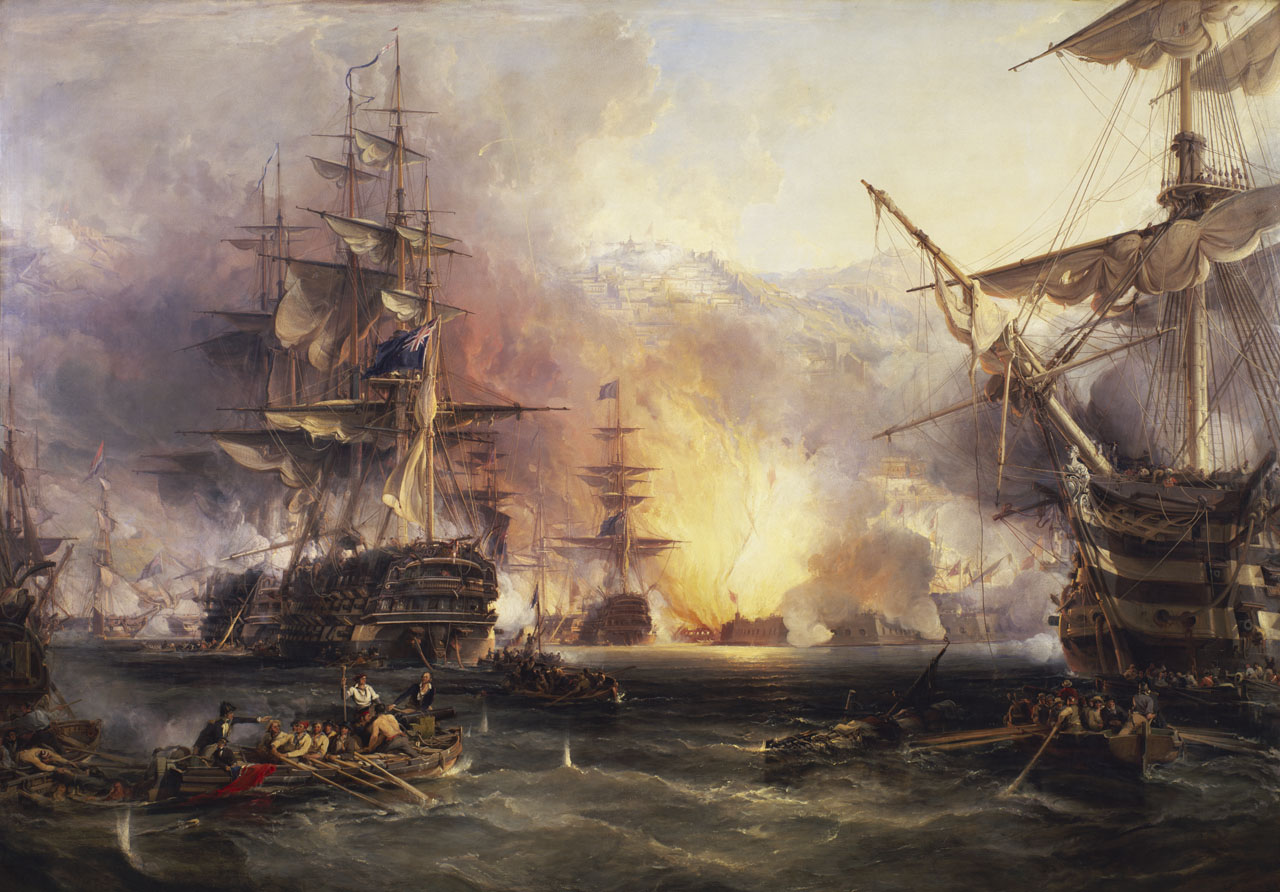
- Bombardment of Algiers, 1816; George Chambers, 1836
Date	27 August 1816; 210 years ago
Location	Algiers, Deylik of Algiers
Result	Anglo-Dutch victory: Signing of a treaty between Algeria and Britain to release 3,000 European slaves

Belligerents
United Kingdom; Netherlands	Deylik of Algiers

Commanders and leaders
(United Kingdom of Great Britain and Ireland) Edward Pellew (United Kingdom of Great Britain and Ireland) David Milne (United Kingdom of the Netherlands) Theodorus Frederik van Capellen	Omar Agha; Ali Khodja; Hussein Khodja

Units involved
Royal Navy; Royal Dutch Navy	Algerine navy Odjak of Algiers; Kabyle contingents

Strength
5 ships of the line 10 frigates (5 Dutch); 1 corvette 8 sloops 4 bomb ketchs 1 aviso (OOB)	17,000 soldiers (11,000 Zouaves and 6,000 janissaries), number of sailors unknown Seaward-facing batteries of 224 cannon 4 frigates 5 corvettes 40 gunboats (OOB)

Casualties and losses
Britain: 141 killed 742 wounded Netherlands: 13 killed 52 wounded	500–5,000 total military and civilian casualties (including 300–2,000 killed); 4 frigates destroyed 5 corvettes destroyed 28 gunboats sunk 12 gunboats beached

The Bombardment of Algiers was an attempt on 27 August 1816 by Britain and the Netherlands to end the slavery practices of Omar Agha, the Dey of Algiers. An Anglo-Dutch fleet under the command of Admiral Edward Pellew, 1st Baron Exmouth bombarded ships and the harbour defences of Algiers.

There was a continuing campaign by various European navies and the American navy to suppress the piracy against Europeans by the North African Barbary states. The specific aim of this expedition, however, was to free Christian slaves and to stop the practice of enslaving Europeans in to slavery in Algeria. To this end, it was partially successful, as the Dey of Algiers freed around 3,000 slaves following the bombardment and signed a treaty against the slavery of Europeans. However, this practice did not end completely until the French conquest of Algeria.

== Background ==
Following the end of the Napoleonic Wars in 1815, the Royal Navy no longer needed the Barbary states as a source of supplies for Gibraltar and their fleet in the Mediterranean Sea. This freed Britain to exert considerable political pressure to force the Barbary states to end their piracy and practice of enslaving European Christians. In early 1816, Exmouth undertook a diplomatic mission to Tunis, Tripoli, and Algiers, backed by a small squadron of ships of the line, to convince the Deys to stop the practice and free the Christian slaves. The Deys of Tunis and Tripoli agreed without any resistance, but the Dey of Algiers was more recalcitrant and the negotiations were stormy. Exmouth believed that he had managed to negotiate a treaty to stop the slavery of Christians and returned to England. However, due to confused orders, Algerian troops massacred 200 Corsican, Sicilian, and Sardinian fishermen who were under British protection just after the treaty was signed. This caused outrage in Britain and Europe, and Exmouth's negotiations were seen as a failure.

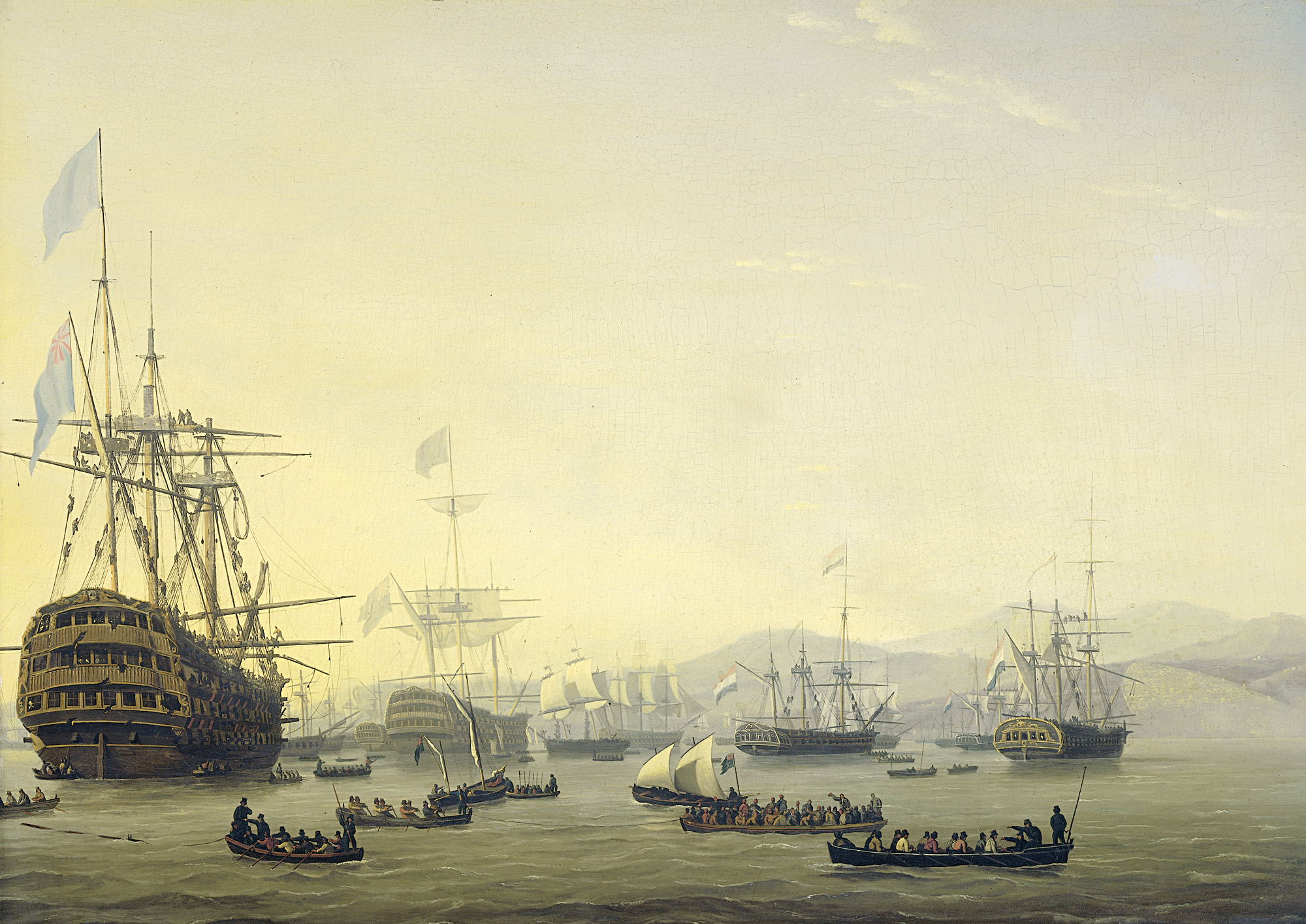
Council of War on board the 'Queen Charlotte', commanded by Lord Exmouth, prior to the Bombardment of Algiers, 26 August 1816 (Nicolaas Baur, 1818)

As a result, Exmouth was ordered to sea again to complete the job and punish the Algerians. He gathered a squadron of five ships of the line (HMS Queen Charlotte, Impregnable, Albion, Minden, and Superb), one 50-gun spar-decked frigate (HMS Leander), four conventional frigates (HMS Severn, Glasgow, Granicus, and Hebrus), and four bomb ships (HMS Belzebub, Fury, Hecla, and Infernal). HMS Queen Charlotte—100 guns—was his flagship and Rear Admiral David Milne was his second in command aboard HMS Impregnable, 98 guns. This squadron was considered by many to be an insufficient force, but Exmouth had already unobtrusively surveyed the defences of Algiers; he was very familiar with the town and was aware of a weakness in the field of fire of the defensive batteries. He believed that more large ships would have interfered with each other without being able to bring much more fire to bear.

In addition to the main fleet, there were five sloops (HMS Heron, Mutine, Prometheus, Cordelia, and Britomart), eight ships' boats armed with Congreve rockets, and some transports to carry the rescued slaves. When the British arrived in Gibraltar, a squadron of five Dutch frigates: HNLMS Melampus (ex HMS Melampus), Diana (ex HMS Diana), Frederica Sophia Wilhelmina, Dageraad, Amstel and the corvette Eendracht, led by Vice-Admiral Theodorus Frederik van Capellen, offered to join the expedition. Exmouth decided to assign them to cover the main force from Algerian flanking batteries, as there was insufficient space in the mole for the Dutch frigates.

== Prelude ==
The day before the attack, the frigate Prometheus arrived and its captain W. B. Dashwood attempted to secretly rescue the British Consul and his wife and infant. Some of the rescue party were discovered and arrested. The plan of attack was for the larger ships to approach in a column. They were to sail into the zone where the majority of the Algerian guns could not be brought to bear. Then, they were to come to anchor and bombard the batteries and fortifications on the mole to destroy the defences. Simultaneously, HMS Leander—50 guns—was to anchor off the mouth of the harbour and bombard the shipping inside the mole. To protect Leander from the shore battery, frigates HMS Severn and Glasgow were to sail inshore and bombard the battery. Troops would then storm ashore on the mole with sappers of the Corps of Royal Engineers.

== Battle ==
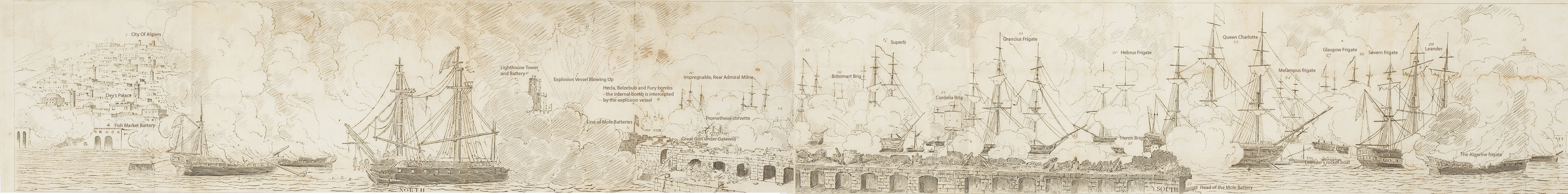
Panorama of the Battle of Algiers 1816, illustration from panoramic views exhibited in Leicester Square, London, 1818

Exmouth in Queen Charlotte anchored approximately 75 m (80 yd) off the mole, facing the Algerian guns. However, a number of the other ships anchored out of position, notably Admiral Milne aboard HMS Impregnable, who was 370 m (400 yd) from where he should have been. This error reduced the effectiveness of these ships and exposed them to fiercer Algerian fire. Some of the other ships sailed past Impregnable and anchored in positions closer to the plan. The unfortunate gap created by the misplaced HMS Impregnable was closed by the frigate HMS Granicus and the sloop Heron.

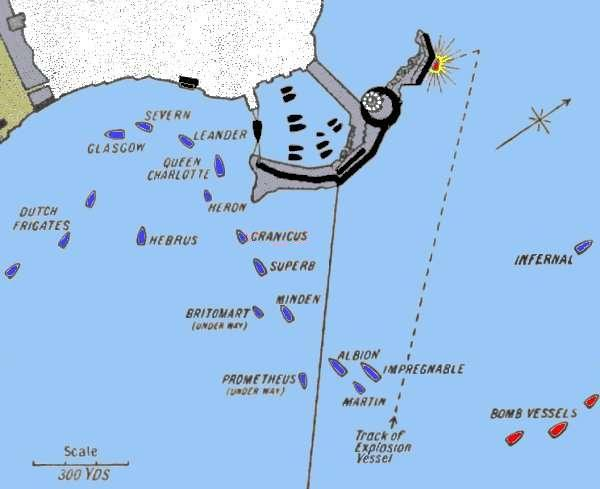
Sketch showing the positions of the fleet during the bombardment

In their earlier negotiations, both Exmouth and the Dey of Algiers had stated that they would not fire the first shot. The Dey's plan was to allow the fleet to anchor and then to sortie from the harbour and board the ships with large numbers of men in small boats. But Algerian discipline was less effective and one Algerian gun fired a shot at 15:15. Exmouth immediately began the bombardment. The Algerian flotilla of 40 gunboats made an attempt to board Queen Charlotte while the sailors were aloft setting sail, but twenty-eight of their boats were sunk by broadsides, and the remaining ran themselves on shore. After an hour, the cannon on the mole were effectively silenced, and Exmouth turned his attention to the shipping in the harbour, which was destroyed by 19:30. One unmanned Algerine frigate was destroyed after being boarded by the crew of Queen Charlotte's barge, who then set it on fire. Three other Algerine frigates and five corvettes were destroyed by the fire of mortars and rockets. The burning shipping drifting in the harbour forced some bombarding ships to manoeuvre out of their way. Impregnable was isolated from the other ships and made a large and tempting target, attracting attention from the Algerian gunners who raked her fore and aft, severely damaging her. 268 shots hit the hull, and the main mast was damaged in 15 places, with 50 killed and 164 wounded.

One sloop had been fitted out as an explosion vessel, with 143 barrels of gunpowder aboard, and Milne asked at 20:00 that it be used against the "Lighthouse battery", which was mauling his ship. The vessel was exploded, but to little effect, and against the wrong battery.

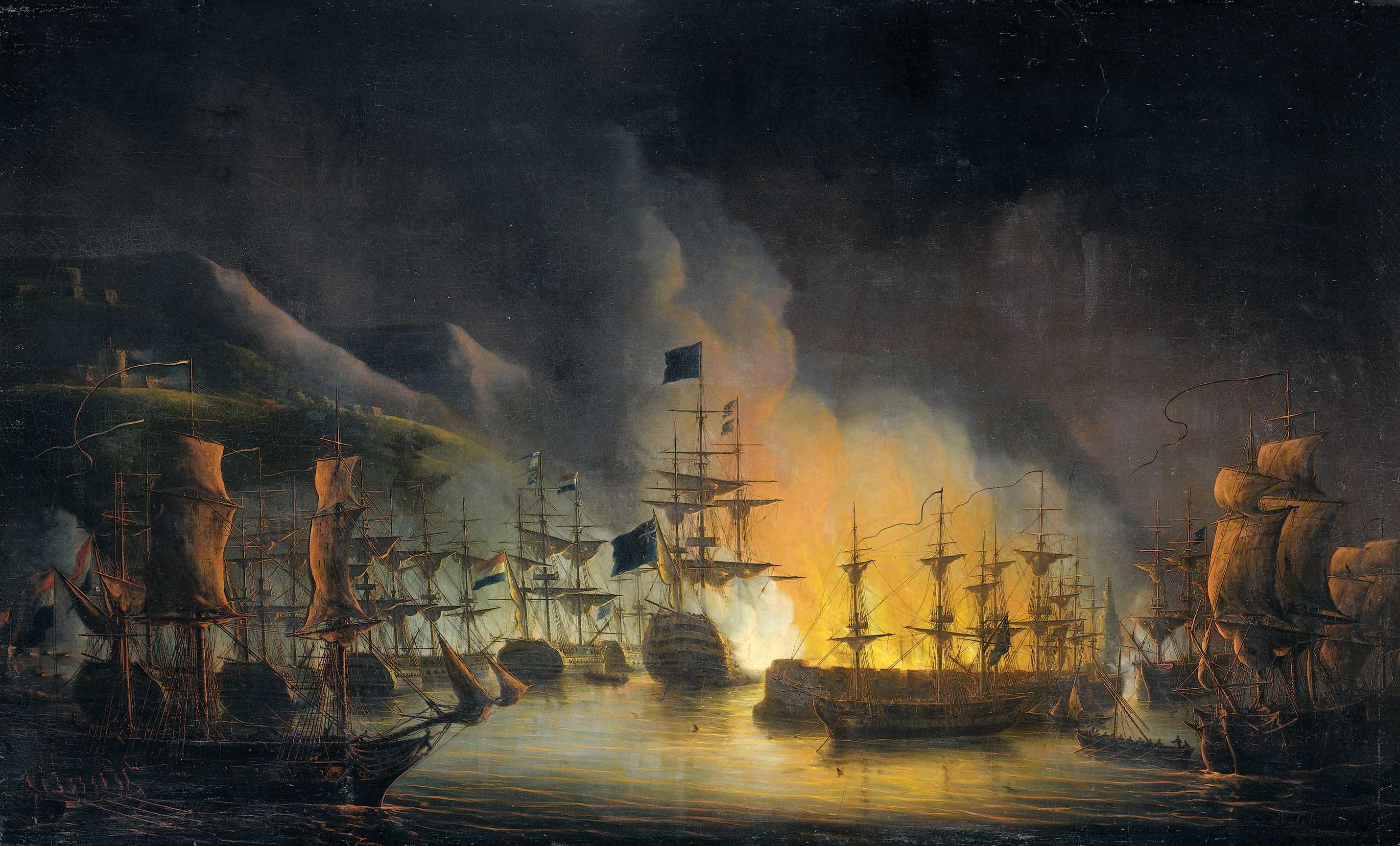
Bombardment of Algiers, painted by Martinus Schouman

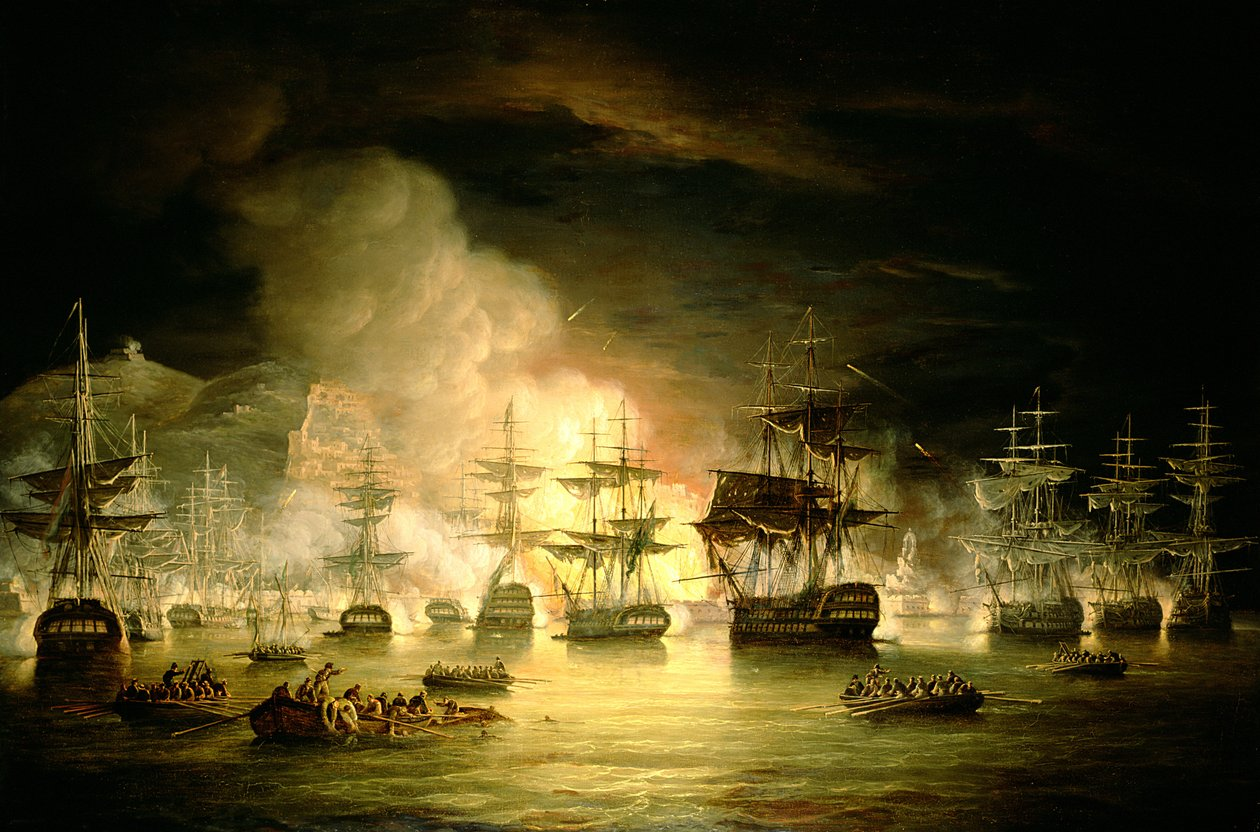
Bombardment of Algiers, a painting of the action by Thomas Luny

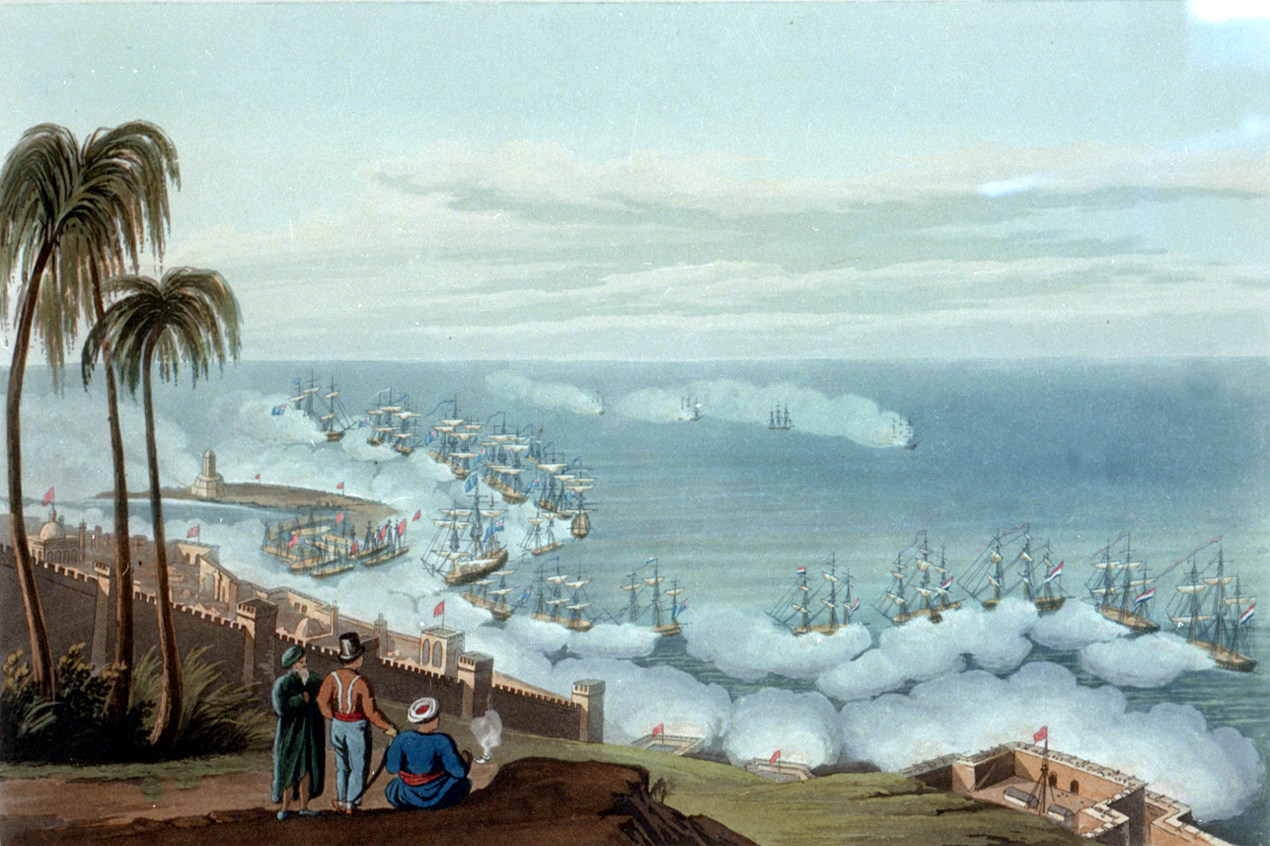
The general engagement, viewed from an eminence, south of the city, painted by William Innes Pocock R.N.

Despite this, the Algerian batteries could not maintain fire and, by 22:15, Exmouth gave the order for the fleet to weigh anchor and sail out of range, leaving HMS Minden to keep firing to suppress any further resistance. The wind had changed and was blowing from the shore, which helped the fleets depart. By 01:30 the next morning, the fleet was anchored out of range. The wounded were treated, and the crew cleared the damage caused by the Algerian guns. Casualties on the British side were more than 900 killed and wounded, a casualty rate that was most sanguinary. For comparison, British casualties at the Battle of Trafalgar had been only 9 percent of those engaged. The allied squadron had fired over 50,000 round shot using 118 tons of gunpowder, and the bomb vessels had fired 960 explosive mortar shells. The Algerian forces had 308 guns and 7 mortars. The translator of the letter Exmouth sent to the Dey left an eye-witness account of the damage done to the city, which he saw when he accompanied the letter under a flag of truce. The construction of the mole could not be discerned, neither could the positions where the batteries had been sited. No more than four or five guns that were still mounted were visible. The bay was filled with the smoking hulks of the remains of the Algerine navy and by many floating bodies.

== Aftermath ==
The following day at noon, Exmouth sent the following letter to the Dey:

Sir, for your atrocities at Bona on defenceless Christians, and your unbecoming disregard of the demands I made yesterday in the name of the Prince Regent of England, the fleet under my orders has given you a signal chastisement, by the total destruction of your navy, storehouse, and arsenal, with half your batteries. As England does not war for the destruction of cities, I am unwilling to visit your personal cruelties upon the unoffending inhabitants of the country, and I therefore offer you the same terms of peace which I conveyed to you yesterday in my Sovereign's name. Without the acceptance of these terms, you can have no peace with England.

He warned that if they were not accepted, then he would continue the action. The Dey accepted the terms, not realising that they were a bluff, as the fleet had already fired off almost all of its ammunition. A treaty was signed on 24 September 1816. The room it was signed in had been hit by nine round shot and was a perfect ruin. The Dey freed 1,083 Christian slaves and the British Consul and repaid the ransom money taken in 1816, about £80,000. Over 3,000 slaves in total were later freed. Drescher notes Algiers as 'the sole case in the sixty years of British slave trade suppression in which a large number of British lives were lost in actual combat.' However, despite British naval efforts, it has been difficult to assess the long-term impact of the Bombardment of Algiers, as the Dey reconstructed Algiers, replacing Christian slaves with Jewish labour, and the Barbary slave trade continued under subsequent Deys (see Congress of Aix-la-Chapelle (1818)).

In 1824 the last Dey of Algiers, Hussein Dey expelled the British consul. A British fleet under Admiral Sir Harry Burrard Neale was sent to reinforce the treaty of 1816. Arriving off the port of Algiers on 11 July, there was a short engagement with over thirty Algerine gunboats a few days later before the fleet withdrew. Two weeks later the British fleet returned and had to threaten to bombard the town before the 1816 treaty was renewed.

== See also ==
- Bombardment of Algiers (disambiguation)
- Algiers expedition (1541)
- Bombardment of Algiers (1683)
- Bombardment of Algiers (1784)
- Djidjelli expedition
- Invasion of Algiers (1775)
- Invasion of Algiers in 1830

== Bibliography ==
- Edwin John Brett, Brett's Illustrated Naval History of Great Britain, from the Earliest Period to the Present Time: A Reliable Record of the Maritime Rise and Progress of England (1871), Publishing Office, London.
- William Osler, The Life of Admiral Viscount Exmouth (1841), Published by Smith, Elder & Co, London.
- Parkinson, C. Northcote (1977). Britannia Rules: The Classic Age of Naval History 1793–1815. Weidenfeld and Nicolson. ISBN 978-0-29-777287-3.
- Parkinson, C. Northcote (1934). Edward Pellew, Viscount Exmouth. Methuen & Co.
- Mariner's Mirror (1941)
- Otridge, J. et al. (1817), "Dispatches from Admiral Lord Exmouth, G.C.B., addressed to John Wilson Croker, Esq," in:The Annual Register, Or, A View of the History, Politics, and Literature for the Year 1816, pp. 230–240; and "Dutch official account of the battle", ibid., pp. 240–243
- Salamé, A. (1819) A Narrative of the Expedition to Algiers in the Year 1816, John Murray, London.
- Seymour Drescher, Abolition: A History of Slavery and Antislavery (2009), Cambridge University Press.
- Porter, Maj Gen Whitworth (1889). History of the Corps of Royal Engineers Vol I. Chatham: The Institution of Royal Engineers.
