= HMS Glasgow (1814) =

British fourth-rate frigate, 1814–1829

HMS Glasgow was a fourth-rate conventional frigate of 50 guns. Built by Wigram & Green of Blackwell, the frigate firsh launched on 21 February 1814.

== Broken Up ==
HMS Glasgow was broken up at Chatham Dockyard in 1829.

== Figurehead ==
The figurehead formed part of the Chatham Dockyard collection of figureheads when it was removed from the vessel after being broken up in 1829. From 1949 to 1976, the figurehead was at HMS Ganges, a boys’ training establishment at Shotley, Suffolk. It was later located outside the Royal Naval Hospital, Haslar, before becoming part of the Royal Naval Museum's collection in 1983.

It can be seen as part of the collection at the National Museum of the Royal Navy, Portsmouth.
