= HMS Queen Charlotte (1810) =

Ship of the line of the Royal Navy

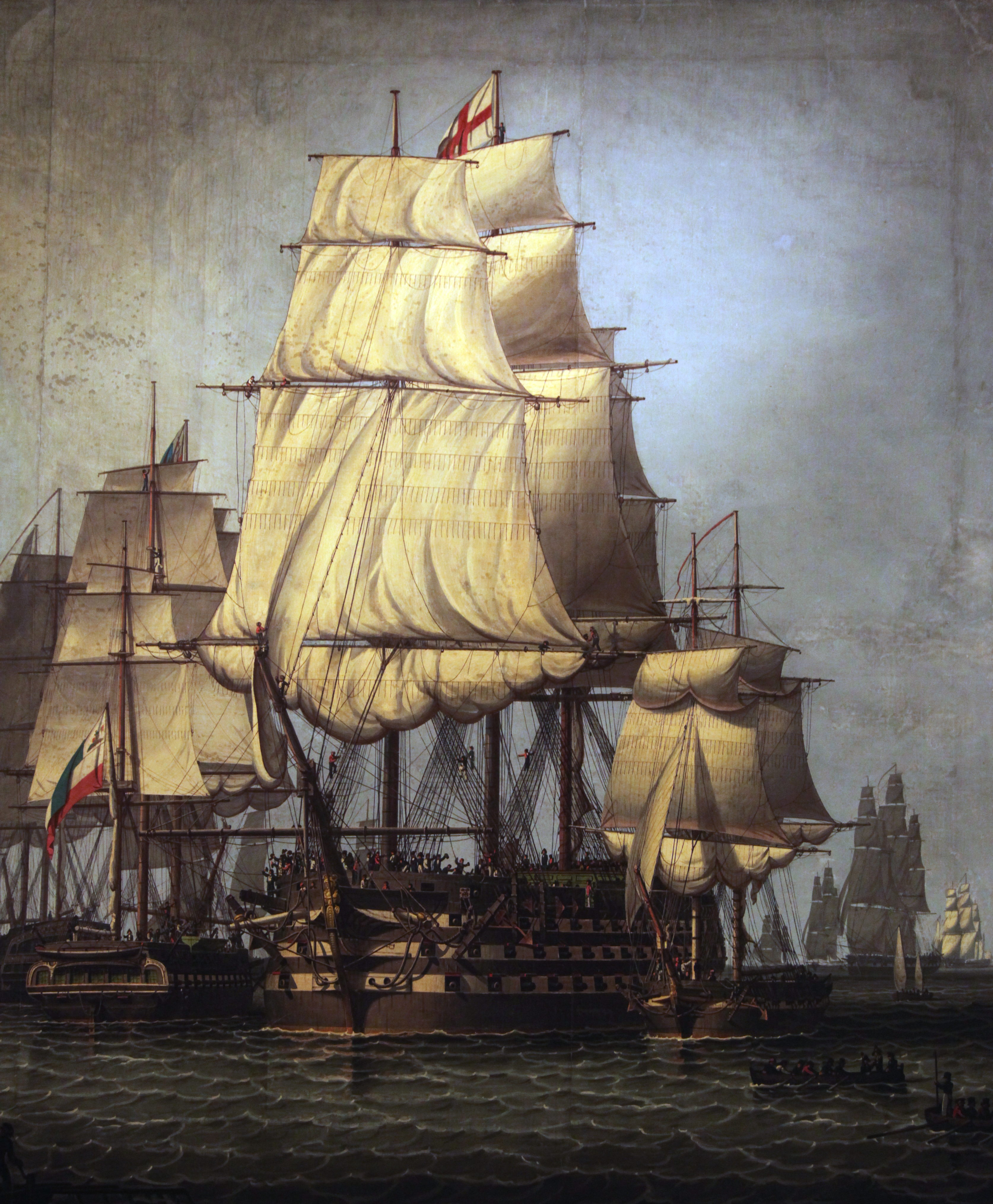
- Detail of Robert Salmon's The British Fleet Forming a Line off Algiers

History

United Kingdom
- Name: HMS Queen Charlotte
- Namesake: Charlotte of Mecklenburg-Strelitz
- Ordered: 9 July 1801
- Builder: Deptford Dockyard
- Laid down: October 1805
- Launched: 17 July 1810
- Commissioned: January 1813
- Fate: Sold, 12 January 1892

General characteristics
- Class & type: 104-gun first-rate ship of the line
- Tons burthen: 2289 bm
- Length: 190 ft 0 1/2 in (57.9 m) (gundeck)
- Beam: 52 ft 5 3/4 in (16.0 m)
- Depth of hold: 22 ft 4 in (6.8 m)
- Propulsion: Sails
- Sail plan: Full-rigged ship
- Armament: Gundeck: 30 × 32-pounder guns; Middle gundeck: 30 × 24-pounder guns; Upper gundeck: 30 × 12-pounder guns; QD: 2 × 12-pounder guns + 12 × 32-pounder carronades; Fc: 2 × 12-pounder guns + 2 × 32-pounder carronades; Poop deck: 6 × 18-pounder carronades

HMS Queen Charlotte was a 104-gun first-rate ship of the line of the Royal Navy, launched on 17 July 1810 at Deptford. She replaced the first Queen Charlotte sunk in 1800.

== Career ==
Queen Charlotte spent a short amount of time as part of the West Africa Squadron in 1816, formed in 1808 in response to An Act for the Abolition of the Slave Trade in Britain that was passed in 1807. The role of the Squadron was to patrol the West Africa coastline, intercepting slaving vessels. Most notably, Queen Charlotte gained notoriety when she captured the Le Louis – a French slaving vessel – on 11 March 1816. Le Louis was taken off Cape Mesurado having set sail from Martinique in January 1816. Following engagement, the ship was taken to Freetown, Sierra Leone, where the Admiralty courts legally confirmed the free status of those on board who had been enslaved. They were then consigned by the colonial government to a variety of unfree labour apprenticeships as part of their transition to becoming 'free subjects'.

HMS Queen Charlotte's seizure of the French slave ship Le Louis, however, caused a legal controversy that tested and defeated Britain's right to search suspected and actual slave ships by challenging the Vienna Declaration of 1815. Sir William Scott, Judge of the High Court of Admiralty, ruled that the right to visit and search royal warships did not exist in peacetime, except in the case of piracy, but because the transatlantic slave trade was not piracy under the Law of Nations, nor had the French declared the transatlantic slave trade to be piracy, the Royal Navy had no right to intercept Le Louis. Scott added:

"A nation is not justified in assuming rights that do not belong to her merely because she means to apply them to a laudable purpose; nor in setting out upon a moral crusade of converting other nations by unlawful force..."

He ended by stating that no government could "force the way to liberation of Africa by trampling on the independence of other states of Europe."

Later that year, Queen Charlotte was Lord Exmouth's flagship during the Bombardment of Algiers in 1816. On 17 September 1817, Linnet, a tender to Queen Charlotte, seized a smuggled cargo of tobacco. The officers and crew of Queen Charlotte shared in the prize money. (Note: A first-class share was worth £101 18s 8d; a sixth-class share, that of an ordinary seaman, was worth 8s 2¼d.) On 17 December 1823, Queen Charlotte was driven into the British ship Brothers at Portsmouth, Hampshire, England. Brothers suffered severe damage in the collision.

Representations of Queen Charlotte

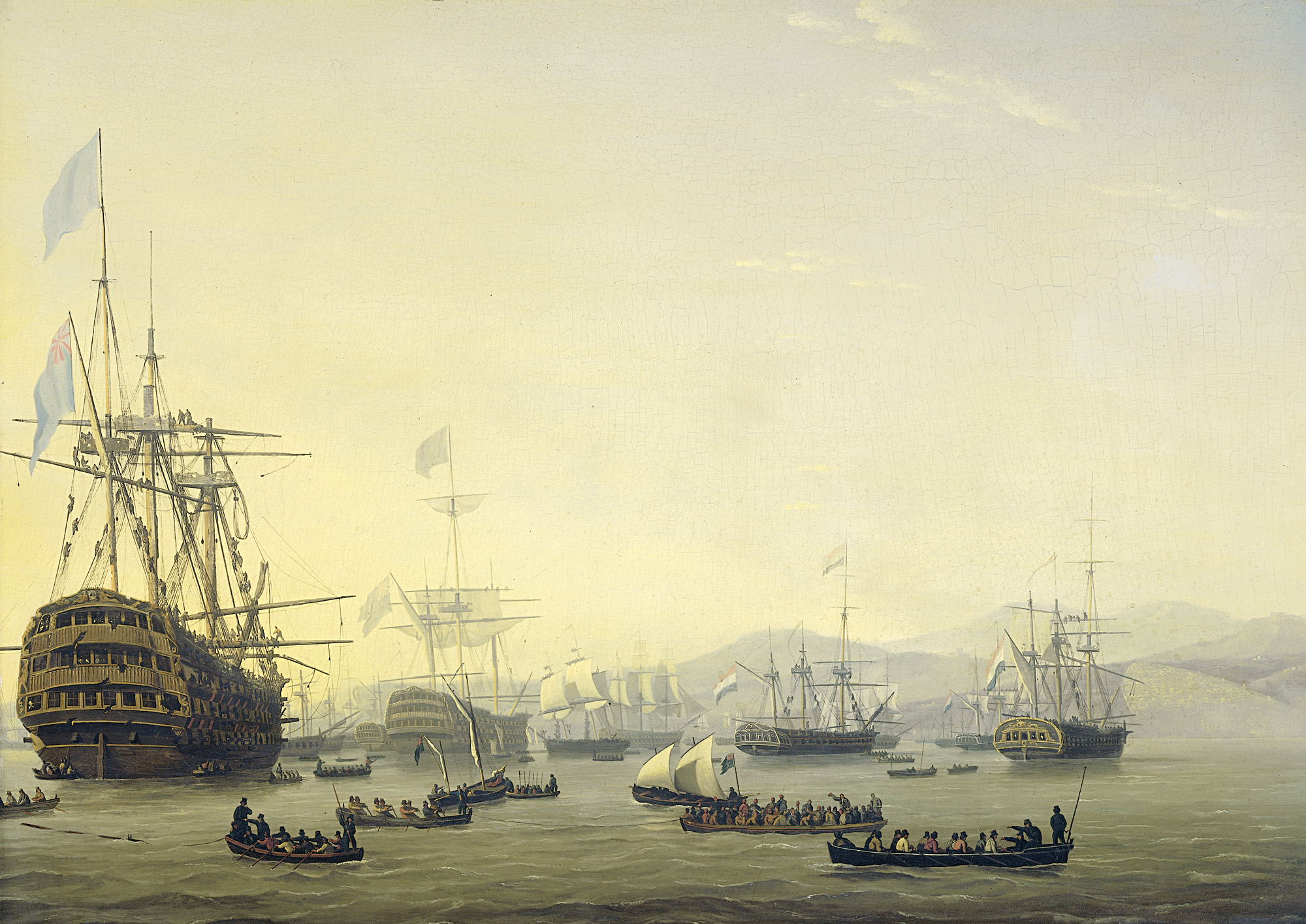
Council of War on board the 'Queen Charlotte', commanded by Lord Exmouth, prior to the Bombardment of Algiers, 26 August 1816, Nicolaas Baur (1818)

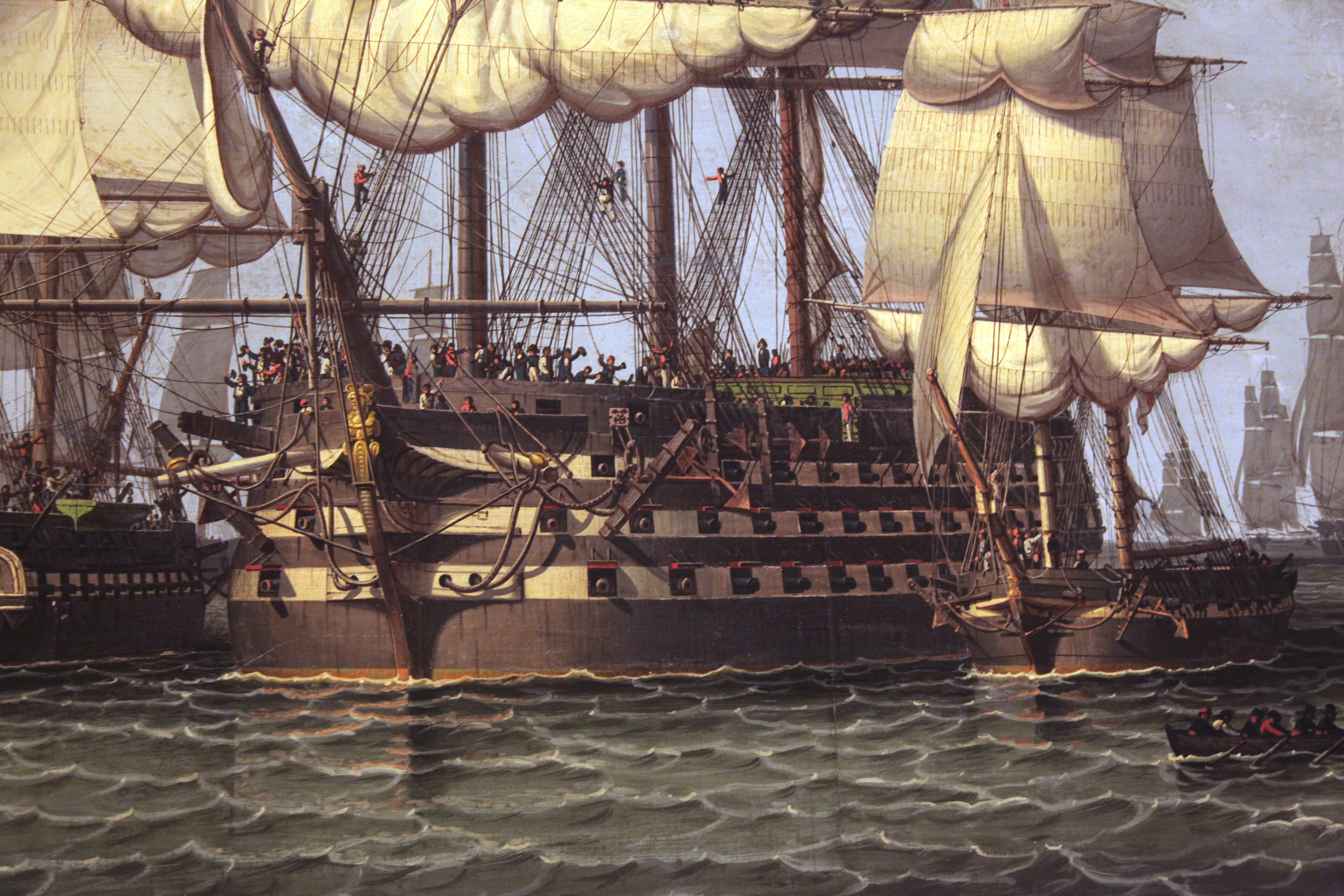
Detail of Robert Salmon's The British Fleet Forming a Line off Algiers

== Figurehead ==
When HMS Queen Charlotte was sold for breaking up, the figurehead was removed and mounted high up on the gabled end of an accommodation block near the entrance to the gunnery training base on Whale Island. When those buildings were demolished in 2004, the figurehead was removed and placed upon a plinth at the entrance to HMS Excellent (shore establishment).

The figurehead is now in the collection of the National Museum of the Royal Navy.
