= List of ship launches in 1804 =

The following ships were launched in 1804.

Date	Ship	Class	Builder	Location	Country	Notes
12 January	Lion	Téméraire-class ship of the line		Rochefort	France	For French Navy.
12 January	Palinure	Palinure-class brig	Antoine, Louis & Mathurin Crucy	Lorient	France	For French Navy.
13 January	Integrity	Cutter	Thomas Moore	Sydney	(United Kingdom of Great Britain and Ireland) New South Wales	For Philip Gidley King.
January	Ballahoo	Ballahoo-class schooner	Goodrich & Co	Bermuda	(United Kingdom of Great Britain and Ireland) Bermuda	For Royal Navy.
January	Caroline	Corvette		Saint-Servan	France	For Robert Surcouf and Louis Blaize de Maisonneuve.
12 February	Resource	Full-rigged ship	Matthew Smith	Calcutta	India	For private owner.
27 February	Eagle	Repulse-class ship of the line	Pitcher	Northfleet	United Kingdom	For Royal Navy.
27 February	The Marquis of Huntley	Merchantman	Hall, Buchan & Co	Aberdeen	United Kingdom	For Messrs. Fraser & Mole.
February	Général Pérignon	Privateer		Saint-Malo	France	For private owner.
February	City of Ghent	Armed vessel		Ghent	France	For military use.
8 March	Hope	Merchantman	Hudson	Calcutta	India	For private owner.
10 March	Kingfisher	Merlin-class ship-sloop	Thomas King	Dover	United Kingdom	For Royal Navy.
22 March	Tigress	Archer-class gun-brig	John Dudman	Deptford	United Kingdom	For Royal Navy.
26 March	Fly	Merlin-class ship-sloop	George Parsons	Bursledon	United Kingdom	For Royal Navy.
27 March	Néarque	Abeille-class brig	Antoine, Louis & Mathurin Crucy	Lorient	France	For French Navy.
31 March	Albury	Snow		Newcastle upon Tyne	United Kingdom	For T. Boyle.
March	São Francisco Xavier	Third rate		Damão	Portugal	For Portuguese Navy.
March	Snake in the Grass	Schooner	Richard Hayden	Saybrook, Connecticut	United States	For Richard Hayden.
12 April	Nautilus	Sloop-of-war	Jacob & Sons	Milford	United Kingdom	For Royal Navy.
17 April	Lynx	Lynx-class brig	Jean Baudry	Bayonne	France	For French Navy.
24 April	Armide	Armide-class frigate	Pierre-Elisabeth Rolland	Rochefort	France	For French Navy.
26 April	Helena	Sloop-of-war	John Preston	Great Yarmouth	United Kingdom	For Royal Navy.
26 April	Bruiser	Archer-class gun-brig	Thomas Pitcher	Northfleet	United Kingdom	For Royal Navy.
28 April	Duchess of Bedford	Merchantman	George Tower & Co	Aberdeen	United Kingdom	For private owner, but hired by the Royal Navy.
April	General Lake	Merchantman	Thompson	Bengal	India	For private owner.
3 May	Blazer	Archer-class gun-brig	Thomas Pitcher	Northfleet	United Kingdom	For Royal Navy.
7 May	Manly	Archer-class gun-brig	John Dudman & Co.	Deptford	United Kingdom	For Royal Navy.
8 May	Flamer	Archer-class gun-brig	Josiah & Thomas Brindley	Frindsbury	United Kingdom	For Royal Navy.
10 May	Albacore	Merlin-class sloop	James Martin Hillhouse	Bristol	United Kingdom	For Royal Navy.
12 May	Lord Keith	East Indiaman	Peter Everitt Mestaer	Rotherhithe	United Kingdom	For British East India Company.
12 May	Royal Sovereign	Royal Yacht	Edward Tippett and Henry Peake	Deptford	United Kingdom	For George III.
23 May	Saracen	Cruizer-class brig-sloop	Perry, Green & Wells	Blackwall Yard	United Kingdom	For Royal Navy.
26 May	Despatch	Cruizer-class brig-sloop	Richard Symons & Co.	Falmouth	United Kingdom	For Royal Navy.
28 May	Silnyi	Selafail-class ship of the line	F. Ignatyev	Arkhangelsk	Russia	For Imperial Russian Navy.
4 June	Président	Frigate	Crucy et Cie.	Nantes	United Kingdom	For French Navy.
7 June	Lutin	Curieux-class brig		Saint-Malo	France	For French Navy.
11 June	Contest	Archer-class gun-brig	Cortney	Chester	United Kingdom	For Royal Navy.
14 June	Centurion	West Indiaman	Tindall	Scarborough	United Kingdom	For Mr. Tindall.
23 June	Pandour	Curieux-class brig	Antoine, Louis & Mathurin Crucy	Nantes	France	For French Navy.
28 June	Phaeton	Palinure-class brig	Danet	Antwerp	France	For French Navy.
30 June	Clinker	Archer-class gun-brig	Thomas Pitcher	Northfleet	United Kingdom	For Royal Navy.
30 June	Cracker	Archer-class gun-brig	Thomas Pitcher	Northfleet	United Kingdom	For Royal Navy.
2 July	Firm	Archer-class gun-brig	Josiah & Thomas Brindley	Frindsbury	United Kingdom	For Royal Navy.
8 July	Faune	Abeille-class brig	Antoine, Louis & Mathurin Crucy	Nantes	France	For French Navy.
8 July	Swiftsure	Swiftsure-class ship of the line	Henry Adams	Bucklers Hard	United Kingdom	For Royal Navy.
9 July	Sylphe	Abeille-class brig	Pierre-Joseph Pénétraut	Dunkirk	France	For French Navy.
10 July	Actéon	Lynx-class brig	Rolland	Rochefort	France	For French Navy.
10 July	Pravyi	Third rate	M. K. Surotsov	Kherson	Russia	For Imperial Russian Navy.
12 July	Espiègle	Palinure-class brig	Enterprise Ethéart	Saint-Malo	France	For French Navy.
14 July	Pærlen	Fifth rate		Copenhagen	Denmark-Norway	For Dano-Norwegian Navy.
19 July	Départment des Landes	Corvette	Jean Baudrey	Bayonne	France	For French Navy.
21 July	Acute	Archer-class gun-brig	William Rowe	Newcastle upon Tyne	United Kingdom	For Royal Navy.
21 July	Furious	Archer-class gun-brig	Josiah & Thomas Brindley	King's Lynn	United Kingdom	For Royal Navy.
21 July	Steady	Archer-class gun-brig	Mark Richards	Hythe	United Kingdom	For Royal Navy.
23 July	Lively	Lively-class frigate		Woolwich Dockyard	United Kingdom	For Royal Navy.
23 July	Safeguard	Archer-class gun-brig	R. Davey	Topsham	United Kingdom	For Royal Navy.
25 July	Piercer	Archer-class gun-brig	O. Ayles	Exeter	United Kingdom	For Royal Navy.
25 July	Raven	Cruizer-class brig-sloop	Perry, Wells & Green	Blackwall Yard	United Kingdom	For Royal Navy.
26 July	Teazer	Archer-class gun-brig	John Dudman	Deptford	United Kingdom	For Royal Navy.
27 July	Biter	Archer-class gun-brig	William Wallis	Blackwall	United Kingdom	For Royal Navy.
28 July	Defender	Archer-class gun-brig	William Courtney	Chester	United Kingdom	For Royal Navy.
4 August	Pelter	Archer-class gun-brig	Dudman & Co.	Deptford	United Kingdom	For Royal Navy.
4 August	Wolf	Merlin-class sloop	Benjamin Tanner	Deptford	United Kingdom	For Royal Navy.
6 August	Sparkler	Archer-class gun-brig	Matthew Warren	Brightlingsea	United Kingdom	For Royal Navy.
7 August	Alert	Gun-brig	Adams	Southampton	United Kingdom	For Royal Navy.
7 August	Hardy	Archer-class gun-brig	R. B. Roxby	Wearmouth	United Kingdom	For Royal Navy.
7 August	Scout	Cruizer-class brig-sloop	Peter Atkinson & Co	Hull	United Kingdom	For Royal Navy.
8 August	Beagle	Cruizer-class brig-sloop	Perry, Wells & Green	Blackwall Yard	United Kingdom	For Royal Navy.
8 August	Tickler	Archer-class gun-brig	Matthew Warren	Brightlingsea	United Kingdom	For Royal Navy.
9 August	Attack	Archer-class gun-brig	Robert Adams	Southampton	United Kingdom	For Royal Navy.
10 August	Growler	Archer-class gun-brig	Balthazar & Edward Adams	Buckler's Hard	United Kingdom	For Royal Navy.
11 August	Bouncer	Brig	William Rowe	Newcastle upon Tyne	United Kingdom	For Royal Navy.
15 August	Reindeer	Cruizer-class brig-sloop	Daniel & Samuel Brent	Rotherhithe	United Kingdom	For Royal Navy.
17 August	Caroline	West Indiaman	Edwards	Shoreham-by-Sea	United Kingdom	For private owner.
21 August	Staunch	Archer-class gun-brig	Benjamin Tanner	Dartmouth	United Kingdom	For Royal Navy.
22 August	Elk	Cruizer-class brig-sloop	Frances Barnard, Sons & Co.	Deptford	United Kingdom	For Royal Navy.
22 August	Harrier	Cruizer-class brig-sloop	Frances Barnard, Sons & Co.	Deptford	United Kingdom	For Royal Navy.
24 August	Pincher	Archer-class gun-brig	Joseph Graham	Harwich	United Kingdom	For Royal Navy.
25 August	Gluckstadt	Sloop-of-war		Copenhagen	Denmark-Norway	For Dano-Norwegian Navy.
31 August	Convulsion	Convulsion-class bomb vessel	Samuel Brent	Rotherhithe	United Kingdom	For Royal Navy.
3 September	Destruction	Convulsion-class bomb vessel	John Perry	Blackwall	United Kingdom	For Royal Navy.
4 September	Musquito	Cruizer-class brig-sloop	John Preston	Great Yarmouth	United Kingdom	For Royal Navy.
5 September	Lady Medelina Sinclair	Full-rigged ship	Thomas Hustwick	Kingston	United Kingdom	For William Osbourne.
6 September	Cygnet	Merlin-class ship-sloop	Palmer	Great Yarmouth	United Kingdom	For Royal Navy.
6 September	Harriet	Full-rigged ship	Brockbank	Lancaster	United Kingdom	For Messrs. Dodson & Co.
7 September	Plumper	Archer-class gun-brig	John Dudman & Co.	Deptford	United Kingdom	For Royal Navy.
7 September	Voltigeur	Palinure-class brig	Danet	Antwerp	France	For French Navy.
8 September	Agincourt	Merchantman	Francis Hurry	North Shields	United Kingdom	For Francis Hurry.
18 September	Attentive	Archer-class gun-brig	Nicholas Bools & William Good	Bridport	United Kingdom	For Royal Navy.
20 September	Gallant	Archer-class gun-brig	R. B. Roxby	Wearmouth	United Kingdom	For Royal Navy.
22 September	Espoir	Cruizer-class brig-sloop	John King	Dover	United Kingdom	For Royal Navy.
September	Swinger	Archer-class gun-brig	Robert Davy	Topsham	United Kingdom	For Royal Navy.
6 October	Prinds Christian Frederik	Third rate	Frantz Hohlenberg	Copenhagen	Denmark-Norway	For Dano-Norwegian Navy.
20 October	Rapid	Archer-class gun-brig	Robert Davy	Topsham	United Kingdom	For Royal Navy.
26 October	Voin	Voin-class frigate	M. K. Surotsov	Kherson	Russia	For Imperial Russian Navy.
29 October	Diomid	Transport ship	V. I. Potapov	Kherson	Russia	For Imperial Russian Navy.
October	Cheerly	Archer-class gun-brig	Nicholas Bools & William Good	Bridport	United Kingdom	For Royal Navy.
October	Daring	Archer-class gun-brig	Jabez Bayley	Ipswich	United Kingdom	For Royal Navy.
October	Moselle	Cruizer-class brig-sloop	John King	Dover	United Kingdom	For Royal Navy.
2 November	Urgent	Archer-class gun-brig	John Bass	Lympstone	United Kingdom	For Royal Navy.
3 November	Combatant	Combatant-class sloop	James Betts	Mistley	United Kingdom	For Royal Navy.
3 November	Surrey	East Indiaman	Dudman	Deptford	United Kingdom	For British East India Company.
5 November	Margaret	Merchantman	Ralston & Smith	Ayr	United Kingdom	For private owner.
17 November	Achille	Téméraire-class ship of the line		Rochefort	France	For French Navy.
17 November	Circe	Thames-class frigate	Joseph Tucker	Plymouth Dockyard	United Kingdom	For Royal Navy.
17 November	Hibernia	First rate		Plymouth Dockyard	United Kingdom	For Royal Navy.
17 November	Pallas	Thames-class frigate		Plymouth Dockyard	United Kingdom	For Royal Navy.
20 November	Amaranthe	Cruizer-class brig-sloop	John Dudman	Deptford	United Kingdom	For Royal Navy.
21 November	Jason	Thames-class frigate		Woolwich Dockyard	United Kingdom	For Royal Navy.
November	Dauntless	Combatant-class sloop	William Gibson	Hull	United Kingdom	For Royal Navy.
November	Valorous	Combatant-class sloop	Blunt	Hull	United Kingdom	For Royal Navy.
3 December	Phoenix	East Indiaman	Frances Barnard, Son, & Roberts	Deptford	United Kingdom	For British East India Company.
6 December	Griper	Archer-class gun-brig	Josiah & Thomas Brindley	King's Lynn	United Kingdom	For Royal Navy.
25 December	Fervent	Archer-class gun-brig	Balthazar Adams	Buckler's Hard	United Kingdom	For Royal Navy.
15 December	Piémontaise	Consolante-class frigate		Saint-Malo	France	For French Navy.
18 December	Fearless	Gun-brig	Graham	Harwich	United Kingdom	For Royal Navy.
20 December	Devonshire	East Indiaman	Pitcher	Northfleet	United Kingdom	For British East India Company.
31 December	Hebe	Fifth rate	Sir Henry Peake	Deptford	United Kingdom	For Royal Navy.
Unknown date	Adamant	Merchantman	Warren		United Kingdom	For Mr Warren.
Unknown date	Admiral Rainier	Luggage boat		Bombay	India	For British East India Company.
Unknown date	Aleksandr	Brig		Kherson	Russia	For Imperial Russian Navy.
Unknown date	Algésiras	Téméraire-class ship of the line		Lorient	France	For French Navy.
Unknown date	Ameland	Full-rigged ship		Dunkirk	France	For Batavian Navy.
Unknown date	Barracouta	Ballahoo-class schooner	Goodrich & Co	Bermuda	(United Kingdom of Great Britain and Ireland) Bermuda	For Royal Navy.
Unknown date	Begun	Begun-class cutter	Vasily Vlasov	Kronstadt	Russia	For Imperial Russian Navy.
Unknown date	Blenheim	Merchantman		Howden	United Kingdom	For private owner.
Unknown date	Bolina	Merchantman	John & Philip Laing	Sunderland	United Kingdom	For W. Bell.
Unknown date	Capelin	Ballahoo-class schooner	Goodrich & Co	Bermuda	(United Kingdom of Great Britain and Ireland) Bermuda	For Royal Navy.
Unknown date	Crul	Full-rigged ship			Batavian Republic	For Batavian Navy.
Unknown date	Dash	Cutter	Nicholas Bools & William Good	Bridport	United Kingdom	For George Browne.
Unknown date	Diana	Sixth rate	Andreas Bodenhoff	Copenhagen	Denmark-Norway	For Dano-Norwegian Navy.
Unknown date	Diana	Brig		Kherson	Russia	For Imperial Russian Navy.
Unknown date	Dowson	Merchantman		Aberdeen	United Kingdom	For Mr. Gibbons.
Unknown date	Duke of Montrose	Packet ship		Falmouth	United Kingdom	For private owner.
Unknown date	Eclipse	Schooner			United Kingdom	For French Navy.
Unknown date	Elisaveta	Brig			Russia	For Imperial Russian Navy.
Unknown date	Fal-i Hayr	Fifth rate			Ottoman Empire	For Ottoman Navy.
Unknown date	Flying Fish	Ballahoo-class schooner			(United Kingdom of Great Britain and Ireland) Bermuda	For Royal Navy.
Unknown date	Fortitude	Merchantman		Calcutta	India	For private owner.
Unknown date	Gijzel	Full-rigged ship			Batavian Republic	For Batavian Navy.
Unknown date	Grappler	Brig	A. Wadell	Calcutta	India	For British East India Company.
Unknown date	Grouper	Ballahoo-class schooner	Goodrich & Co	Bermuda	(United Kingdom of Great Britain and Ireland) Bermuda	For Royal Navy.
Unknown date	Harriet	Merchantman	John Brockbank	Lancaster	United Kingdom	For private owner.
Unknown date	Haughty	Archer-class gun-brig	John Dudman	Deptford	United Kingdom	For Royal Navy.
Unknown date	Hebe	Merchantman		Leith	United Kingdom	For Mr. Strachan.
Unknown date	Henry Wellesley	Barque	Bacon, Harvey & Co.	Calcutta	India	For private owner.
Unknown date	Hope	Smack	Nicholas Bools & William Good	Bridport	United Kingdom	For Leith Shipping Co.
Unknown date	Hermione	Hortense-class frigate			France	For French Navy.
Unknown date	Herring	Ballahoo-class schooner	Goodrich & Co	Bermuda	(United Kingdom of Great Britain and Ireland) Bermuda	For Royal Navy.
Unknown date	Hirondelle	Privateer		Cette	France	For private owner.
Unknown date	Janes	Merchantman		Sunderland	United Kingdom	For private owner.
Unknown date	John	West Indiaman		Chepstow	United Kingdom	For J. Maxse & Co.
Unknown date	Lady Boringdon	Merchantman		Great Yarmouth	United Kingdom	For private owner.
Unknown date	Lord Melville	Merchantman		Leith	United Kingdom	For private owner.
Unknown date	Lord Melville	Sloop	Temple	South Shields	United Kingdom	For private owner.
Unknown date	Mackerel	Ballahoo-class schooner	Goodrich & Co	Bermuda	(United Kingdom of Great Britain and Ireland) Bermuda	For Royal Navy.
Unknown date	Majestic	Merchantman	Holt & Richardson	Whitby	United Kingdom	For Aaron & Edward Chapman and Robert Campion.
Unknown date	Malabar	Brig	Temple shipbuilders		United Kingdom	For Brown & Co.
Unknown date	Margaret	Brig	J. Gilmour & Co.	Calcutta	India	For private owner.
Unknown date	Maria	Merchantman	Hudson & Bacon.	Howrah	India	For private owner.
Unknown date	Mariner	Merchantman		Whitehaven	United Kingdom	For J. Askew.
Unknown date	Marquis of Huntley	West Indiaman	Duthie	Aberdeen	United Kingdom	For Latham & Co.
Unknown date	Mary's	Snow	Benjamin Heward	Sunderland	United Kingdom	For private owner.
Unknown date	Monarch	West Indiaman		Sunderland	United Kingdom	For private owner.
Unknown date	Montezuma	Merchantman		Philadelphia, Pennsylvania	United States	For Snowden & North.
Unknown date	Piercer	Archer-class gun-brig	Obadia Ayles	Topsham	United Kingdom	For Royal Navy.
Unknown date	Pike	Ballahoo-class schooner	Goodrich & Co	Bermuda	(United Kingdom of Great Britain and Ireland) Bermuda	For Royal Navy.
Unknown date	Pilchard	Ballahoo-class schooner	Bermuda		(United Kingdom of Great Britain and Ireland)	For Royal Navy.
Unknown date	Piper	Sloop	John Ball	Salcombe	United Kingdom	For Mr. Buckley & others.
Unknown date	Pulteney	Schooner	Nicholas Bools & William Good	Bridport	United Kingdom	For William Aylesbury and others.
Unknown date	Ramilles	Collier		North Shields	United Kingdom	For private owner.
Unknown date	Raposa	Brig			Spain	For private owner.
Unknown date	Saint Andrew, or St. Andrew	Sloop	J. Goodchild, Jr.	Pallion	United Kingdom	For private owner.
Unknown date	Sir John Sherbroke	Brig			(United Kingdom of Great Britain and Ireland) Nova Scotia	For private owner.
Unknown date	Sokol	Begun-class cutter	Vasily Vlasov	Kronstadt	Russia	For Imperial Russian Navy.
Unknown date	Strela	Sixth rate	Vasily Vlasov	Kronstadt	Russia	For Imperial Russian Navy.
Unknown date	Swift	Smack	Nicholas Bools & William Good	Bridport	United Kingdom	For Edinburgh Shipping Co.
Unknown date	Telegraph	Brig	John Perry	Blackwall	United Kingdom	For private owner.
Unknown date	Van Galen	Full-rigged ship			Batavian Republic	For Batavian Navy.
Unknown date	Venus	Sloop	Nicholas Bools & William Good	Bridport	United Kingdom	For Mr. Andrews.
Unknown date	Vertumnus	Brig	J. Taylor	Monkwearmouth	United Kingdom	For Kirkcaldy & Co.
Unknown date	Windsor Castle	Brig		Great Yarmouth	United Kingdom	For Mr. Sutton.
Unknown date	Woodman	Coaster		Newcastle upon Tyne	United Kingdom	For Mr. Reay.
Unknown date	Name unknown	Merchantman		Nantes	France	For private owner.
Unknown date	Name unknown	Merchantman		New York	United States	For private owner.
Unknown date	Name unknown	Merchantman			Sweden	For private owner.
Unknown date	Name unknown	Schooner		Fowey	United Kingdom	For private owner.
Unknown date	Name unknown	Merchantman			France	For private owner.
Unknown date	Name unknown	Merchantman		Boston, Massachusetts	United States	For private owner.
Unknown date	Name unknown	Merchantman			Spain	For private owner.
