= Transport vessels of the 1820 Settlers =

In 1820 the British Government sponsored the emigration of some 4000 settlers from England to South Africa. In addition to the sponsored immigrants, some private parties also sailed to South Africa in 1820.

Vessel	Burthen (bm)	Master	Passengers
Abeona (1811 ship)	324 or 331	James Pritchard	166
Albury (1804 ship)	338 to 342	Cunningham	166
Amphitrite	274	Martin (or Davidson)	60
Aurora (1808 ship)	468 or 471	Thomas Pearson	344
Belle Alliance (1817 ship)	637	Rolfe (or Roulff)	307
Brilliant (1814 ship)	330 or 332	William Bothwell	144
Cambrian		Brownrigg	
Canada (1811 ship)	268 or 281	Amm (or Annan)	35
Chapman (1777 ship)	542 to 558	John Milbank	271
Dowson	370	Jameson	21
Duke of Marlborough	356	Jeffrey (or Jeffries)	40
East Indian (1819 ship)	390	Hogg	220
Fanny	232	W.Sadler	112
Garland	181	Brown	59
John	418	Pearson	252
Kennersley Castle (1811 ship)	371 or 400	Pinckney	202
Mary Ann Sophia	296	Hayward	14
Medusa (1813 ship)	217	Hutchinson	
Nautilus	401	W.Walton	202
Northampton (1801 ship)	523 to 573	Charlton	257
Ocean (1808 ship)	435 to 439	Davs	206
Salisbury (1818 ship)	117 to 120	James King	20
Sir George Osborne	312 to 316	Taplin (or Toplin)	111
Skelton (1818 ship)	260	Dixon	
Stentor (1814 ship)	382	Harris	194
Waterloo (1815 Sunderland ship)	215	Lion (or Lyon)	61
HMS Weymouth	826	Turner	478
Zoroaster (1818 ship)	460	Thompson	142
