= Dowson (ship) =

Several vessels have been named Dowson:

- Dowson (1804 ship) was launched in Aberdeen. She spent 10 years as a transport, presumably for the government. Between 1814 and 1819 she disappeared from the registers, though ship arrival and departure data suggests some activity from 1817 on. From 1819 on she traded to Africa, and elsewhere. She wrecked in the St Lawrence in 1824.
- Dowson (1807 ship) was launched in Hull in 1807 as a West Indiaman. She quickly became a transport and then made one voyage to New South Wales. Later she traded with North America. She survived maritime mishaps in 1807 and 1821. Her crew abandoned her in the Atlantic Ocean on 19 October 1836.
