= List of shipwrecks in September 1836 =

The list of shipwrecks in September 1836 includes ships sunk, foundered, wrecked, grounded, or otherwise lost during September 1836.

== 1 September ==
List of shipwrecks: 1 September 1836
Ship	State	Description
Tinker	United Kingdom	The ship ran aground on the Beamer Rock, off North Queensferry, Fife. She was on a voyage from Charlestown to Aberdeen. Tinker was refloated on 8 September and taken in to North Queensferry.

== 2 September ==
List of shipwrecks: 2 September 1836
Ship	State	Description
Medusa	United Kingdom	The ship was wrecked on the Colorados, off the coast of Cuba with the loss of 31 of the 35 people on board. She was on a voyage from Port Morant, Jamaica to Kinsale, County Cork.

== 3 September ==
List of shipwrecks: 3 September 1836
Ship	State	Description
Belfast	United Kingdom	The ship ran aground at Shoreham-by-Sea, Sussex. She was on a voyage from Shoreham-by-Sea to Dieppe, Seine-Inférieure, France. Belfast was refloated on 6 September.
Johanna	Russia	The ship was wrecked on Cape Sable Island, Lower Canada, British North America. She was on a voyage from Saint Petersburg to New York, United States.
Squirrel	United Kingdom	The sloop was run down and sunk in the North Sea off Holy Isle, in the Firth of Clyde by Rapid (United Kingdom) with the loss of two of her four crew. Squirrel was on a voyage from Larne, County Antrim to Glasgow, Renfrewshire.

== 5 September ==
List of shipwrecks: 5 September 1836
Ship	State	Description
Ferdinand	Danzig	The ship was wrecked on Bornholm, Denmark. She was on a voyage from Danzig to Hull, Yorkshire, United Kingdom.

== 7 September ==
List of shipwrecks: 8 September 1836
Ship	State	Description
Fanny	(United Kingdom of Great Britain and Ireland) New South Wales	The schooner was lost off East Cape, New Zealand. Her crew were rescued.

== 8 September ==
List of shipwrecks: 8 September 1836
Ship	State	Description
Guinare	France	The ship struck a sunken rock off Jersey, Channel Islands and foundered. All on board were rescued.
Margaret	United Kingdom	The ship was driven ashore on Neckman's Grounds. She was refloated on 12 September and taken in to Saint Petersburg, Russia.

== 9 September ==
List of shipwrecks: 9 September 1836
Ship	State	Description
Melona	United Kingdom	The ship ran aground off Kronstadt, Russia. She was refloated on 12 September.

== 10 September ==
List of shipwrecks: 10 September 1836
Ship	State	Description
Catharina Maria	Prussia	The ship was driven ashore at Pillau. She was on a voyage from Königsburg to Dundee, Forfarshire, United Kingdom.
Elbana	Spain	The ship was wrecked on the coast of Pará, Brazil.
Excellent	United Kingdom	The ship was wrecked on the coast of Yucatán, Mexico. She was on a voyage from British Honduras to London.
Henriette	Stettin	The ship was driven ashore on the Nelvung Sandbank, in the Baltic Sea. She was on a voyage from Stettin to Königsburg.
Hope	United Kingdom	The ship was driven ashore near Crosby, Lancashire. She was on a voyage from Sierra Leone to Liverpool, Lancashire.

== 11 September ==
List of shipwrecks: 11 September 1836
Ship	State	Description
Diana	United Kingdom	The ship was driven ashore on Terschelling, Friesland, Netherlands. Her crew were rescued. She was on a voyage from Dram, Norway to Great Yarmouth, Norfolk.
Henry	United Kingdom	The ship was severely damaged at King's Lynn, Norfolk.
John and Amelia	United Kingdom	The ship ran aground on the Barber Bank, in the North Sea and was damaged. She was later refloated and taken in to Great Yarmouth, Norfolk.
Hibernia	United Kingdom	The ship sprang a leak and foundered in the North Sea off Cromer, Norfolk. Her crew were rescued. She was on a voyage from Sunderland, County Durham to London.

== 12 September ==
List of shipwrecks: 12 September 1836
Ship	State	Description
Andrew Nugent	United Kingdom	The ship ran aground on the Middle Bank, off Sligo and was severely damaged. She was refloated on 16 September and taken in to Sligo.
Ann	United Kingdom	The ship caught fire at Kronstadt, Russia and was scuttled.
Avon	United Kingdom	The ship was driven ashore and wrecked on Bornholm, Denmark. She was on a voyage from Riga, Russia to London.
Esperance	United Kingdom	The ship was driven ashore on Prince Edward Island, British North America. She was refloated in November.
Friends	United Kingdom	The ship was wrecked at Sandwich, Kent. Her crew were rescued. She was on a voyage from Newcastle upon Tyne, Northumberland to the Charente and Oran, Algeria.
Heart of Oak	United Kingdom	The ship was run down and sunk in the River Thames at Greenwich, Kent. She was on a voyage from Ipswich, Suffolk to London. Heart of Oak was later refloated.
St. Antonius	Prussia	The ship was driven ashore at "Yleiland". She was on a voyage from Memel to Rotterdam, South Holland, Netherlands.

== 13 September ==
List of shipwrecks: 13 September 1836
Ship	State	Description
Amity	United Kingdom	The ship ran aground and sank at Cardiff, Glamorgan.
Earl	United Kingdom	The brig was driven ashore on Gotland, Sweden. She was on a voyage from Riga, Russia to Arbroath, Forfarshire.
Heart of Oak	United Kingdom	The ship was run down and sunk in the River Thames at Greenwich, Kent. Her crew were rescued.
St. Anthonie	Netherlands	The ship was driven ashore at Zandvoort, North Holland. Her crew were rescued. She was on a voyage from Memel, Prussia to Rotterdam, South Holland.

== 14 September ==
List of shipwrecks: 14 September 1836
Ship	State	Description
John and Catherine	United Kingdom	The ship was wrecked on the Haisborough Sands, in the North Sea off the coast of Norfolk with the loss of three of her crew. She was on a voyage from Danzig to Great Yarmouth, Norfolk.
John Guise	United Kingdom	The ship was driven ashore and severely damaged at Pakefield, Suffolk. Her crew were rescued. She was on a voyage from St. Petersburg, Russia to Chepstow, Monmouthshire. John Guise was refloated on 22 September.
Susquehannah	United States	The ship was driven ashore at Marcus Hook, Pennsylvania.

== 15 September ==
List of shipwrecks: 15 September 1836
Ship	State	Description
Eulie	France	The ship was wrecked at Dunkirk, Nord. Her crew were rescued. She was on a voyage from Portugal to Dunkirk.
Vrow Antje	Netherlands	The ship was driven ashore at Zandvoort, North Holland. Her crew were rescued. She was on a voyage from Memel, Prussia to Rotterdam, South Holland.

== 16 September ==
List of shipwrecks: 16 September 1836
Ship	State	Description
Elizabeth	United States	The whaler was driven ashore and wrecked on Pico Island, Azores.
Frankfort Packet	United Kingdom	The ship was driven ashore near Glückstadt, Duchy of Holstein.
Helen	United Kingdom	The ship was driven ashore at "Killunden Point". She was on a voyage from Newcastle upon Tyne, Northumberland to Dublin. Helen was later refloated and taken in to Tobermory, Isle of Mull.
Oscar	(Russian Empire) Grand Duchy of Finland	The ship was beached at Leman Sand, towed to Harwich, Essex, United Kingdom. She was on a voyage from Wasa to Honfleur, Calvados, France.

== 17 September ==
List of shipwrecks: 17 September 1836
Ship	State	Description
Commerce	France	The ship was run down and sunk in the Mediterranean Sea off Adra, Spain by Russia (United States). Commerce was on a voyage from Hyères, Var to Dunkirk, Nord.
Henry	United Kingdom	The ship was driven into the quayside and sank at King's Lynn, Norfolk. She was subsequently refloated.

== 18 September ==
List of shipwrecks: 18 September 1836
Ship	State	Description
Mercurius	Netherlands	The ship sprang a leak and was beached at "Rongermenn", where she was wrecked. She was on a voyage from Cardiff, Glamorgan, United Kingdom to Rotterdam, South Holland.
Tucker	United Kingdom	The ship struck the Sizewell Bank, in the North Sea off the coast of Suffolk and was damaged. She was on a voyage from Newcastle upon Tyne, Northumberland to London. Tucker was refloated and put into Harwich, Essex in a leak condition.

== 19 September ==
List of shipwrecks: 19 September 1836
Ship	State	Description
Ben	United Kingdom	The ship was wrecked on the Shipwash Sand, in the North Sea off the coast of Essex. Her crew were rescued.
Ostendais	Belgium	The ship sprang a leak and foundered in the Bristol Channel off Lundy Island, Devon, United Kingdom. She was on a voyage from Liverpool, Lancashire, United Kingdom to Ostend, West Flanders.

== 20 September ==
List of shipwrecks: 20 September 1836
Ship	State	Description
Lady Stirling	(United Kingdom of Great Britain and Ireland) Colony of Western Australia	The ship was wrecked in the Swan River.

== 22 September ==
List of shipwrecks: 22 September 1836
Ship	State	Description
Abraham	Denmark	The ship was wrecked near Ringkøbing. Her crew were rescued. She was on a voyage from Helsingør to Antwerp, Belgium.
New Orleans	United States	The ship was driven ashore at New Orleans, Louisiana. She was on a voyage from Liverpool, Lancashire, United Kingdom to New Orleands.
Ottilie	Stettin	The ship was wrecked near Hjørring, Denmark. Her crew were rescued. She was on a voyage from Fraserburgh, Aberdeenshire, United Kingdom to Stettin.
William and Henry	United Kingdom	The ship was abandoned in the North Sea. Her crew were rescued. She was on a voyage from London to Memel, Prussia.

== 23 September ==
List of shipwrecks: 23 September 1836
Ship	State	Description
King	United Kingdom	The smack was driven ashore and wrecked at Milford Haven, Pembrokeshire. Her crew were rescued.
Rose in June	(United Kingdom of Great Britain and Ireland) Guernsey	The ship foundered in the English Channel off Start Point, Devon. Her crew were rescued by a fishing smack. She was on a voyage from Brixham, Devon to Guernsey.

== 27 September ==
List of shipwrecks: 27 September 1836
Ship	State	Description
Bjorneborg	(Russian Empire) Grand Duchy of Finland	The ship was driven ashore on Bornholm, Denmark. She was on a voyage from Bjorneborg to Helsingør, Denmark.
Emelie	France	The ship was wrecked on the Lafolle Reef, off the coast of Haiti. Her crew were rescued.

== 28 September ==
List of shipwrecks: 28 September 1836
Ship	State	Description
Hannah and Mary	United Kingdom	The schooner was driven ashore near Freswick, Caithness. She was on a voyage from Banff to Bristol, Gloucestershire.

== 29 September ==
List of shipwrecks: 29 September 1836
Ship	State	Description
Bee	United Kingdom	The ship was driven ashore near Tynewater, Lothian with the loss of all hands.
Unity	United Kingdom	The ship was driven ashore on Ross Point, County Mayo. She was on a voyage from Quebec City, Lower Canada, British North America to Killala, County Mayo. She was refloated on 8 October.

== 30 September ==
List of shipwrecks: 30 September 1836
Ship	State	Description
Frances and Mary	United Kingdom	The ship departed from Waterford for Plymouth, Devon. No further trace, presumed foundered with the loss of all hands.
Mauritania	United Kingdom	The ship was driven ashore and severely damaged near Mogadore, Morocco. Her crew were rescued.
Resolute	United Kingdom	The ship was driven ashore at Barry, Glamorgan. She was on a voyage from Dublin to Pembrey, Carmarthenshire. Resolute was refloated on 8 October and taken in to Pembrey.

== Unknown date ==
List of shipwrecks: Unknown date in September 1836
Ship	State	Description
Clipper	United Kingdom	The ship was lost at the "Island of Corsica, Africa". Her crew were rescued.
Courier	France	The ship was run down and sunk in the Kattegat. Her crew were rescued.
Debron	United Kingdom	The ship was abandoned in the Atlantic Ocean before 18 September.
Fortitude	United Kingdom	The ship ran aground on the Cork Sand, in the North Sea before 10 September. She was later refloated and taken in to Harwich, Essex in a leaky condition.
Hope	United Kingdom	The ship was driven ashore at Liverpool, Lancashire before 10 September. She was on a voyage from Sierra Leone to Liverpool. Hope was refloated on 24 September.
Industry	New Zealand	The ship was driven ashore some 20 miles to the north of the Hokianga Harbour, New Zealand.
James Laing	United Kingdom	The ship was driven ashore in the Hokianga Harbour, New Zealand. She was later refloated and taken into Sydney, New South Wales for repairs.
Lewis	United States	The ship was abandoned in the Atlantic Ocean before 6 September.
Louise	United Kingdom	The ship foundered in the Irish Sea off Holyhead, Anglesey on or before 8 September.
Phœnix	France	The ship was wrecked "on the Pignaux". She was on a voyage from Adra, Spain to Marseille, Bouches-du-Rhône.
Zoroaster	United Kingdom	The brig's crew mutinied, murdered the captain, his wife and chief officer, and scuttled the vessel on or before 3 September. Zoroaster was on a voyage from "Pilen" to China.
