= List of shipwrecks in August 1823 =

The list of shipwrecks in August 1823 includes all ships sunk, foundered, grounded, or otherwise lost during August 1823.

== 3 August ==
List of shipwrecks: 3 August 1823
Ship	State	Description
Concord	United Kingdom	The ship was wrecked at Findhorn, Morayshire. Her crew survived. She was on a voyage from Liverpool, Lancashire, to Findhorn.

== 4 August ==
List of shipwrecks: 4 August 1823
Ship	State	Description
Hope	United States	The schooner was wrecked on Little Bird Island Reef, off the coast of Antigua.
Speedwell	United Kingdom	The ship was driven ashore in Cardigan Bay. She was on a voyage from Chester, Cheshire, to Bristol, Gloucestershire.

== 5 August ==
List of shipwrecks: 5 August 1823
Ship	State	Description
Santa Maria Magdalena	Spain	The ship was lost near Cádiz. She was on a voyage from A Coruña to Cádiz.

== 8 August ==
List of shipwrecks: 8 August 1823
Ship	State	Description
Iris	United Kingdom	The ship was wrecked on Cobler's Rock, Barbados. Her crew were rescued. She was on a voyage from Demerara to London.

== 10 August ==
List of shipwrecks: 10 August 1823
Ship	State	Description
Lady Combermere	United Kingdom	The ship was driven ashore at Southport, Lancashire. She was on a voyage from Africa to Liverpool, Lancashire.
Nymph	United Kingdom	The ship was wrecked at Dungeness, Kent. Her crew were rescued. She was on a voyage from Newcastle upon Tyne, Northumberland, to Falmouth, Cornwall.

== 11 August ==
List of shipwrecks: 11 August 1823
Ship	State	Description
Enterprize	United Kingdom	The ship sprang a leak in the North Sea and was beached at Cromer, Norfolk. She was on a voyage from Colchester, Essex, to Sunderland, County Durham.
Henderson	United Kingdom	The ship was driven ashore at Workington, Cumberland. She was refloated on 22 August.
Richard Harvey	United States	The schooner was lost in the Turks Islands. Her crew were rescued. She was on a voyage from New York to Jamaica.

== 12 August ==
List of shipwrecks: 12 August 1823
Ship	State	Description
Isabella	United Kingdom	The ship ran aground on the Insand, in the North Sea off the coast of Northumberland.
Lapwing	United Kingdom	The ship ran aground on the Insand.

== 13 August ==
List of shipwrecks: 13 August 1823
Ship	State	Description
Friendship	United Kingdom	The ship was run down and sunk in the North Sea off "Skitter Ness" by Dorothy (United Kingdom).

== 14 August ==
List of shipwrecks: 14 August 1823
Ship	State	Description
Parker and Sons	United Kingdom	The ship was wrecked on Bahia Honda Key, Florida Territory. She was on a voyage from New Orleans, Louisiana, United States, to the Clyde.
Swallow Packet	United Kingdom	The ship ran aground on the Ballast Bank, off Bangor, County Down, and was severely damaged.
Warrell	United Kingdom	The brig ran aground on the West Hoyle Bank, in Liverpool Bay. Her crew were rescued.

== 15 August ==
List of shipwrecks: 15 August 1823
Ship	State	Description
George IV	United Kingdom	The brig was run down and sunk in the Atlantic Ocean by the barque Hannah (United Kingdom) with the loss of 123 of the 129 people on board. The survivors were rescued by Hannah. On 18 August, Hannah was abandoned, all on board were rescued by Ospra (United States). George IV was on a voyage from Waterford to Quebec City, Lower Canada, British North America. Hannah was on a voyage from Prince Edward Island, British North America, to South Shields, County Durham.
Mary	United States	The ship was wrecked on the north coast of Bermuda. Her crew were rescued. She was on a voyage from New York to St. Thomas, Virgin Islands.
Parker & Sons	United Kingdom	The ship struck the Honda Rock, in the Gulf of Florida and was beached. She was on a voyage from New Orleans, Louisiana, United States, to the Clyde.

== 16 August ==
List of shipwrecks: 16 August 1823
Ship	State	Description
Caractacus	United Kingdom	The sloop was wrecked on the West Hoyle Bank, in Liverpool Bay with the loss of all hands.
Radius	United States	The ship sank in Prince's Dock, Liverpool and was severely hogged.
Success	United Kingdom	The ship was wrecked at Les Sables d'Olonne, Vendée, France. Her crew were rescued. She was on a voyage from the Île d'Oléron, Charente-Maritime to Abbeville, Somme, France.

== 17 August ==
List of shipwrecks: 17 August 1823
Ship	State	Description
Clara	Stettin	The ship struck a sandbank off "Cape Tortosa" and sank. She was on a voyage from Marseille, Bouches-du-Rhône, France, to Stettin.

== 18 August ==
List of shipwrecks: 18 August 1823
Ship	State	Description
Echo	United States	The schooner was damaged by fire at Ramsgate, Kent, United Kingdom, with the loss of her captain. A crew member was severely injured.
Neutralist	Netherlands	The East Indiaman was wrecked at Gunwalloe, Cornwall, United Kingdom. She was on a voyage from La Rochelle, Charente-Maritime, France, to a Norwegian port.

== 19 August ==
List of shipwrecks: 19 August 1823
Ship	State	Description
Catharine	United Kingdom	The ship was driven ashore near Port St. Mary, Isle of Man. Her crew were rescued. She was on a voyage from Caernarfon to Belfast, County Antrim.
Mary	United Kingdom	The ship struck a rock off The Skerries and foundered. Her crew survived. She was on a voyage from Whitehaven, Cumberland, to Dublin.

== 22 August ==
List of shipwrecks: 22 August 1823
Ship	State	Description
Betsey	United Kingdom	The sloop foundered in the Irish Sea off the Smalls Lighthouse. Her crew were rescued by the schooner Betsey (United Kingdom).

== 23 August ==
List of shipwrecks: 23 August 1823
Ship	State	Description
Mariner	United Kingdom	The ship was abandoned in the Atlantic Ocean. She was on a voyage from Ayr to Richibucto, New Brunswick, British North America. She sank the next day.

== 25 August ==
List of shipwrecks: 25 August 1823
Ship	State	Description
Hind	United Kingdom	The ship was in collision with a Revenue Cutter off Aberdeen and was beached. She was refloated the next day and found to be severely damaged.
Salamander	United Kingdom	The ship was lost off "Kole", Sweden. Her crew were rescued. She was on a voyage from Saint Petersburg, Russian Empire, to London.

== 27 August ==
List of shipwrecks: 27 August 1823
Ship	State	Description
Nancy	United Kingdom	The ship sprang a leak and was beached near Cabo Catoche, Mexico. She was on a voyage from Havana, Cuba, to Montego Bay, Jamaica.
Neptune	Stettin	The ship was driven ashore and wrecked near "Monkwich", Russia. She was on a voyage from Saint Petersburg, Russia, to Stettin.

== 30 August ==
List of shipwrecks: 30 August 1823
Ship	State	Description
Louisa	United Kingdom	The ship foundered in the Baltic Sea off Helsinki, Finland. All on board were rescued.

== 31 August ==
List of shipwrecks: 31 August 1823
Ship	State	Description
Hadlow	United Kingdom	The ship departed from Sierra Leone for London. No further trace, presumed foundered with the loss of all hands.
James	United Kingdom	The ship was driven ashore and wrecked at Ekenäs, Finland. All on board were rescued.

== Unknown date ==
List of shipwrecks: Unknown date in August 1823
Ship	State	Description
Edward	United Kingdom	The brig was scuttled by her crew, who had murdered her captain. She was on a voyage from Portsmouth, Hampshire, to South America.
La Jeune Émilie	France	The ship was driven ashore and wrecked on the coast of Hampshire, United Kingdom. She was on a voyage from Rouen, Seine-Inférieure to Southampton, Hampshire.
Rose	United Kingdom	The ship was wrecked on the coast of Labrador, British North America, in early August.
Sisters	United Kingdom	The whaler was sighted off the coast of Japan. No further trace, presumed foundered with the loss of all hands.
Vriendschap	Netherlands	The ship foundered on a voyage from Liverpool, Lancashire, United Kingdom, to Antwerp. Her crew were rescued.
William Henry	United States	The schooner capsized neat the "Hole-in-the-Wall" in mid-August. Her crew were rescued. She was on a voyage from Havana, Cuba, to Savannah, Georgia.
