= Henry Wellesley =

Henry Wellesley may refer to:

- Henry Wellesley, 1st Baron Cowley (1773–1847), diplomat, brother of the 1st Duke of Wellington
- Henry Wellesley (1794–1866), scholar, youngest child of Richard Wellesley, 1st Marquess Wellesley, a nephew of the 1st Duke of Wellington
- Henry Wellesley, 3rd Duke of Wellington (1846–1900), politician
- Henry Wellesley, 1st Earl Cowley (1804–1884), British diplomat
- Henry Wellesley, 3rd Earl Cowley (1866–1919)
- Henry Wellesley, 6th Duke of Wellington (1912–1943), British peer and politician
- Henry Wellesley (1804 ship), a barque that made three whaling voyages and two voyages carrying convicts to Australia before she was wrecked in 1841.
