= List of shipwrecks in May 1841 =

The list of shipwrecks in May 1841 includes ships sunk, foundered, wrecked, grounded, or otherwise lost during May 1841.

== 1 May ==
List of shipwrecks: 1 May 1841
Ship	State	Description
Brothers	United Kingdom	The Galway hooker was wrecked near Ballyheigue, County Galway. Her four crew survived.
Champion	United Kingdom	The ship ran aground on the Sorkholm Reef, in the Baltic Sea.
Stambol	Austrian Empire	The steamship was driven ashore and wrecked near Sinope, Ottoman Empire. Her crew were rescued.

== 2 May ==
List of shipwrecks: 2 May 1841
Ship	State	Description
Cambridge	United Kingdom	The ship was sunk by ice in the Baltic Sea. Her crew were rescued by a Russian ship. She was on a voyage from Reval, Russia to Newcastle upon Tyne, Northumberland.
Clyde	United Kingdom	The ship struck rocks off Cooley Point, County Louth and sank. She was on a voyage from Workington, Cumberland to Annagassan, County Louth.
Exchange	United Kingdom	The ship ran aground on the Kettleness Steel, off the coast of North Riding of Yorkshire. She was refloated and taken into Whitby.
Harmony	United Kingdom	The ship ran aground on the Whitby Rock, off the coast of Yorkshire. She was refloated the next day.
Johanna Sophia	Netherlands	The ship capsized and sank off Helsingør, Denmark with the loss of two of her crew. She was on a voyage from Stralsund to Schiedam, South Holland. Johanna Sophia was refloated on 22 May. She was subsequently taken into Copenhagen, Denmark for repairs.
Prince of Wales	United Kingdom	The ship was run aground and was damaged on the Whitby Rock. She was refloated the next day.

== 3 May ==
List of shipwrecks: 3 May 1841
Ship	State	Description
Clytie	United Kingdom	The ship struck rocks off Coolie Point, County Louth and sank. She was on a voyage from Workington, Cumberland to Drogheda, County Louth.
Effort	United Kingdom	The ship ran aground and was severely damaged at Llanelly, Glamorgan. She was on a voyage from Llanelly to London.
Jackson	United Kingdomp	The ship struck a rock off the Mount of Corby, County Louth and sank. Her crew were rescued.
Medway	United Kingdom	The ship was driven ashore and wrecked at Thisted, Denmark. Her crew were rescued. She was on a voyage from Newcastle upon Tyne, Northumberland to Saint Petersburg, Russia.
North Briton	United Kingdom	The ship was sighted off Anjer, Netherlands East Indies whilst on a voyage from Singapore to London. No further trace, presumed foundered with the loss of all hands.

== 4 May ==
List of shipwrecks: 4 May 1841
Ship	State	Description
Chance	United Kingdom	The ship was driven ashore at Hull, Yorkshire.
Lively	United Kingdom	The billy boy was wrecked on the Buxey Sand, in the North Sea off the coast of Essex. Her crew were rescued. She was on a voyage from Goole, Yorkshire to London.
Starbeck	United Kingdom	The ship ran aground off Lymington, Hampshire. She was on a voyage from Newport, Isle of Wight to Southampton, Hampshire. Starbeck was later refloated and resumed her voyage.
Susan	United Kingdom	The ship foundered off "Darlington". Her crew were rescued.
Union	United Kingdom	The brig ran aground on the Nore. She was later refloated.

== 5 May ==
List of shipwrecks: 5 May 1841
Ship	State	Description
Codrington	United Kingdom	The ship ran aground at Antigua. She was on a voyage from Antigua to London. She was refloated the next day and resumed her voyage on 7 May.
Dispatch	United Kingdom	The ship was wrecked off Sanda Island, Argyllshire. Her crew were rescued. She was on a voyage from Dundalk, County Louth to Greenock, Renfrewshire.
Frederico	Spain	The brig capsized in the Atlantic Ocean (29°30′N 67°30′W) whilst bound for Puerto Rico. Her nine crew took to a boat. They were rescued on 6 June by Sylphe (France).

== 6 May ==
List of shipwrecks: 6 May 1841
Ship	State	Description
Dalmarnock	United Kingdom	The ship ran aground at Dundee, Forfarshire. She was on a voyage from Dundee to Saint Thomas, Virgin Islands. Dalmarnock was refloated and resumed her voyage.
Express	(United Kingdom of Great Britain and Ireland) New South Wales	The schooner was driven ashore and wrecked at Gerringong.
Mary Ann	United Kingdom	The ship was driven ashore and damaged at Margate, Kent. She was on a voyage from Liverpool, Lancashire to London. Mary Ann was refloated and taken into Margate.
Olivia	Danzig	The barque ran aground on the Goodwin Sands, Kent. She was on a voyage from London to Bremen. Olivia was refloated and put into Harwich, Essex, United Kingdom.
Sonne	Hamburg	The ship ran aground on the Half-ebb Rock, off Harwich and was damaged. She was on a voyage from Maldon, Essex to Hamburg.

== 7 May ==
List of shipwrecks: 7 May 1841
Ship	State	Description
Diadem	United Kingdom	The ship was driven ashore at Shoreham-by-Sea, Sussex.

== 8 May ==
List of shipwrecks: 8 May 1841
Ship	State	Description
Breeze	United Kingdom	The brig was wrecked on Scatterie Island, Nova Scotia, British North America. All on board, the crew and 150 passengers, were rescued. She was on a voyage from Limerick to Quebec City, Province of Canada, British North America.
Paragon	United Kingdom	The ship was in collision with Susquehanna (United States) in the Atlantic Ocean (43°20′N 26°30′E) and was severely damaged. Her crew were taken off the next day by London (United Kingdom). Paragon was on a voyage from Liverpool, Lancashire to Halifax, Nova Scotia.
Rival	United Kingdom	The trow was wrecked at Sand Point, Somerset. Her crew were rescued. She was on a voyage from Highbridge to Pill.
To Systra	Prussia	The ship ran aground and sank off Hanö, Sweden. Her crew were rescued. She was on a voyage from Memel to Leith, Lothian, United Kingdom.

== 9 May ==
List of shipwrecks: 9 May 1841
Ship	State	Description
Isabella	United Kingdom	The ship was sunk by an iceberg in the Atlantic Ocean (44°02′N 48°45′W). Her crew took to the boats. One of them died before the survivors were rescued on 11 May by Kingston (United Kingdom). Isabella was on a voyage from London to Quebec City, Province of Canada, British North America.

== 10 May ==
List of shipwrecks: 10 May 1841
Ship	State	Description
Mary Scott	United Kingdom	The brig was run into by Brooklyn (United States) and sank in the Irish Sea with eight of her fifteen crew. Survivors were rescued off the Isle of Man by a Manx fishing boat. Mary Scott was on a voyage from Valparaíso, Chile to Liverpool, Lancashire.
Premier	United Kingdom	The brig was driven ashore and wrecked on Fårö, Sweden. Her crew were rescued. She was on a voyage from Saint Petersburg, Russia to Hull, Yorkshire

== 11 May ==
List of shipwrecks: 11 May 1841
Ship	State	Description
Bernard	United Kingdom	The brig was wrecked on the Goodwin Sands, Kent with the loss of all hands.
Catherine	(United Kingdom of Great Britain and Ireland) British North America	The brigantine ran aground on the Horseshoe Reef and was damaged. She was on a voyage from Miramichi, New Brunswick to Liverpool, Lancashire, United Kingdom. Catherine was later refloated and resumed her voyage.
Eliza and Ann	United Kingdom	The ship sank at Gloucester.
Isabella	United Kingdom	The ship was driven ashore at Kingstown, County Dublin. She was on a voyage from Liverpool, Lancashire to Algiers, Algeria. Isabella was refloated and taken into Kingstown.
Memnon	United Kingdom	The ship ran aground off the coast of India and was wrecked. She was on a voyage from Bombay to Liverpool.

== 12 May ==
List of shipwrecks: 12 May 1841
Ship	State	Description
Elizabeth	United Kingdom	The barque was driven ashore and wrecked at Cape Breton Point, Cape Breton Island, Nova Scotia, British North America with the loss of seven crew. She was on a voyage from Falmouth, Cornwall to Miramichi, New Brunswick, British North America.
City of Perth	United Kingdom	The ship was wrecked at "St. Louis", Republic of Texas. Her crew were rescued. She was on a voyage from St. Louis to Liverpool, Lancashire.
St. Petersburg	United Kingdom	The ship was wrecked on St. Paul Island, Nova Scotia, British North America. Her crew were rescued. She was on a voyage from Sunderland, County Durham to Richibucto, New Brunswick, British North America.

== 13 May ==
List of shipwrecks: 13 May 1841
Ship	State	Description
Ganges	United States	The ship ran aground off "Mattacunbia" and was severely damaged. She was on a voyage from New Orleans, Louisiana to Havre de Grâce, Seine-Inférieure, France. Ganges was refloated on 26 May and taken into Key West, Florida Territory.

== 15 May ==
List of shipwrecks: 15 May 1841
Ship	State	Description
John	United Kingdom	The ship was driven ashore near Cape North, Nova Scotia, British North America. Her crew were rescued. She was on a voyage from Liverpool, Lancashire to Miramichi, New Brunswick, British North America.

== 16 May ==
List of shipwrecks: 16 May 1841
Ship	State	Description
Beeze	United Kingdom	The brig was driven ashore on Paul's Island, Labrador, British North America.

== 17 May ==
List of shipwrecks: 17 May 1841
Ship	State	Description
Earl of Durham	United Kingdom	The ship was driven ashore on the "Walla Grundt". She was on a voyage from Liverpool, Lancashire to Riga, Russia. She was refloated on 19 May and taken into Landskrona, Sweden for repairs.
Elizabeth	(United Kingdom of Great Britain and Ireland) New Zealand	The schooner was wrecked on a reef off the Poor Knights. All on board were rescued. She was on a voyage from the Bay of Islands to Auckland.
Hope and Athlone	United Kingdom	The brig was wrecked on the south east coast of Gotland, Sweden. Her crew survived. She was on a voyage from Sunderland, County Durham to Saint Petersburg, Russia.
Isabella	United Kingdom	The ship was driven ashore and wrecked at Parton, Cumberland. She was on a voyage from Whitehaven, Cumberland to Belfast, County Antrim.
John Lloyd	United Kingdom	The ship ran aground at Youghal, County Cork. She was on a voyage from Youghal to Newport, Monmouthshire. She was refloated and resumed her voyage.
Raby Castle	United Kingdom	The brig ran aground on the Nore. She was on a voyage from Newcastle upon Tyne, Northumberland to London. She was refloated the next day with assistance from three luggers.

== 18 May ==
List of shipwrecks: 18 May 1841
Ship	State	Description
Catapilco	United States	The brig was wrecked in a hurricane at Acajutla, El Salvador.
Diana	Hamburg	The ship struck a sunken rock off "Fugla Island" and was damaged. She was on a voyage from St. Ubes, Portugal to Hamburg. Diana put into Hammerfest, Norway for repairs.
Isadora	United Kingdom	The ship was driven ashore and wrecked at Vizagapatam, India.
James Tamer	United Kingdom	The ship was wrecked at Long Point, Nova Scotia, British North America. She was on a voyage from Liverpool, Lancashire to Miramichi, New Brunswick, British North America.
Mary Ann	United Kingdom	The ship was wrecked on Point Escuminac, New Brunswick.
Mersey	United Kingdom	The ship was driven ashore at Fox Island Gully, New Brunswick. She was later refloated.
Minstrel	United Kingdom	The brig was wrecked on the Red Island Reef with the loss of 148 of the 156 people on board. She was on a voyage from Limerick to Quebec City, Province of Canada, British North America.

== 19 May ==
List of shipwrecks: 19 May 1841
Ship	State	Description
Clarence	United Kingdom	The ship ran aground in the Saint Lawrence River.
Devereux	United Kingdom	The ship was severely damaged in a gale at Quebec City, Province of Canada, British North America.
Java	United Kingdom	The ship was severely damaged in a gale at Quebec City.
Venture	United Kingdom	The ship was severely damaged in a gale at Quebec City.
Welsford	United Kingdom	The ship was severely damaged in a gale at Quebec City.
Wensleydale	United Kingdom	The ship was severely damaged in a gale at Quebec City.
William Dawson	United Kingdom	The ship was severely damaged in a gale at Quebec City.

== 20 May ==
List of shipwrecks: 20 May 1841
Ship	State	Description
Amelie	France	The ship was lost on "Magdalene Island", near "Goree". Her crew were rescued. She had sailed from Havana, Cuba.
Donna Pascoa	United Kingdom	The ship was wrecked at Calcutta, India. She was on a voyage from Calcutta to Bombay.
Highland Chief	United Kingdom	The ship caught fire in the Saint Lawrence River and was scuttled. She was on a voyage from Leith, Lothian to Montreal, Province of Canada, British North America.
Ida	Prussia	The ship ran aground and was wrecked off Rattray Head, Aberdeenshire, United Kingdom. Her crew were rescued. She was on a voyage from Stettin to Liverpool, Lancashire.
Regia	United Kingdom	The grab brig was destroyed by fire off the north west coast of Ceylon with the loss of four of her 21 crew.

== 21 May ==
List of shipwrecks: 21 May 1841
Ship	State	Description
Annandale	United Kingdom	The brig was wrecked in the Magdalen Islands, Province of Canada, British North America. Her crew were rescued. She was on a voyage from Liverpool, Lancashire to Quebec City, Province of Canada.
Cornelius	United Kingdom	The ship was wrecked on the Monsicar Reef, in the Mediterranean Sea off Malta. Her crew were rescued. She was on a voyage from Alexandria, Egypt to Falmouth, Cornwall.
Crown	United Kingdom	The brig was driven ashore and wrecked at Budleigh Salterton, Devon. Her crew were rescued.
Watchful	United Kingdom	The ship ran aground on the Anholt Reef, in the Baltic Sea. She was on a voyage from Memel, Prussia to London. Watchful was later refloated.

== 22 May ==
List of shipwrecks: 22 May 1841
Ship	State	Description
Agra	United Kingdom	The brig was wrecked at Palmyras Point, India and was abandoned the next day. Six people in one boat were rescued by Colonel Newall (United Kingdom). No trace of the 14 people in the second boat. She was on a voyage from Mauritius to Calcutta, India.
Royal Adelaide	United Kingdom	The steamship ran aground in the River Thames at Erith, Kent. She was on a voyage from London to Leith, Lothian. Royal Adelaide was refloated on 24 May.

== 23 May ==
List of shipwrecks: 23 May 1841
Ship	State	Description
Wallace	United Kingdom	The ship was wrecked on Grand Manan Island, New Brunswick, British North America. Her crew were rescued. She was on a voyage from Liverpool, Lancashire to Saint John, New Brunswick.

== 24 May ==
List of shipwrecks: 24 May 1841
Ship	State	Description
Admiral Benbow	United Kingdom	The ship was wrecked in the Bay of Fundy near Campobello Island, New Brunswick, British North America. Her crew were rescued.
Agra	United Kingdom	The ship was lost off Point Palmyras, India. She was on a voyage from Mauritius to Calcutta, India.

== 25 May ==
List of shipwrecks: 25 May 1841
Ship	State	Description
Henry Wellesley	United Kingdom	The barque went ashore near Calais, France, and was wrecked. She was on a voyage from London to Hobart, Van Diemen's Land.
Jannette	Belgium	The ship was in collision with Fortuna ( Danzig) in the English Channel off The Casquets and was abandoned by her crew. She was on a voyage from Antwerp to Guernsey, Channel Islands. Jannette was towed into Salcombe, Devon, United Kingdom on 27 May.
Maria	United Kingdom	The ship was wrecked on the Goodwin Sands, Kent. Her crew were rescued. She was on a voyage from Ipswich, Suffolk to Liverpool, Lancashire.
Miranda	United Kingdom	The full-rigged ship was wrecked on "Reeas Island". Her crew took to the boats and reached Surabaya, Netherlands East Indies.
Watchful	United Kingdom	The ship ran aground off Anholt, Denmark. She was on a voyage from Memel, Prussia to Limerick. Watchful was later refloated.
Wilsons	United Kingdom	The ship ran aground on the Middle Sand, in the North Sea off the coast of Essex. Her crew were rescued. She was on a voyage from Newcastle upon Tyne, Northumberland to London.

== 26 May ==
List of shipwrecks: 26 May 1841
Ship	State	Description
Eliza	United Kingdom	The schooner ran aground at Hayle, Cornwall.
Young Benjamin	United Kingdom	The ship ran aground and was damaged on the Cabe Rocks, Cornwall. She was refloated the next day.

== 28 May ==
List of shipwrecks: 28 May 1841
Ship	State	Description
George Marriott	Trieste	The ship was wrecked on Grand Bahama. She was on a voyage from New Orleans, Louisiana, United States to Trieste.
Sampson	United Kingdom	The brig ran aground off the coast of Newfoundland, British North America. All passengers on board were landed. She was on a voyage from London to New York, United States. Sampson was refloated and taken into Whitehead, Nova Scotia, British North America.
Zwei Gebruders	Lübeck	The ship was driven ashore at Bremen and abandoned by her crew. She was on a voyage from Lübeck to Hull, Yorkshire, United Kingdom.

== 29 May ==
List of shipwrecks: 29 May 1841
Ship	State	Description
Anna	United Kingdom	The brig was wrecked on the coast of Arakan. She was on a voyage from Calcutta, India to Moulmein, Burma.
Edina	United Kingdom	The ship was wrecked at Torbay, Newfoundland, British North America. Her crew were rescued. She was on a voyage from Matanzas, Cuba to Quebec City, Province of Canada, British North America.
Edward and Margaret	United Kingdom	The ship was wrecked on the Gore Sand, in the Bristol Channel with the loss of two of her crew. She was on a voyage from Sunderland, County Durham to Bridgwater, Somerset.
Lady Douglas	United Kingdom	The ship was wrecked on "Cape Le Have", Nova Scotia, British North America. Her crew were rescued. She was on a voyage from Savannah, Georgia, United States to Halifax, Nova Scotia.
Rosehill	United Kingdom	The ship ran aground on the North Bank, in Liverpool Bay. She was on a voyage from Liverpool, Lancashire to Dunkirk, Nord, France.
Samson	United Kingdom	The ship struck a rock at Whitehead, Nova Scotia and was wrecked. All on board were rescued. She was on a voyage from London to New York, United States.

== 30 May ==
List of shipwrecks: 30 May 1841
Ship	State	Description
Margarets	United Kingdom	The ship ran aground on the London Chest, in the Baltic Sea. She was on a voyage from Newcastle upon Tyne, Northumberland to Saint Petersburg, Russia. Margarets was refloated and completed her voyage.

== 31 May ==
List of shipwrecks: 31 May 1841
Ship	State	Description
Eugenie	France	The brig foundered off Rodrigues, Mauritius. Her crew were rescued.

== Unknown date ==
List of shipwrecks: Unknown date in May 1841
Ship	State	Description
Alarm	United Kingdom	The ship was wrecked on the Gunfleet Sand, in the North Sea off the coast of Essex before 29 May. She was on a voyage from Hamburg to London.
Albion	United Kingdom	The ship was wrecked on the Red Island Reef before 20 May, having been abandoned before 15 April. She was on a voyage from Bristol, Gloucestershire to Quebec City, Province of Canada, British North America.
Charles	United States	The ship was abandoned in the Atlantic Ocean off British Honduras on or before 7 May, her crew possibly having been attacked. She was on a voyage from New Orleans, Louisiana to Bordeaux, Gironde, France.
Content	United Kingdom	The ship was driven ashore on Saltholm, Denmark. She was on a voyage from Rostock to Preston, Lancashire. Content was refloated and put into Copenhagen, Denmark for repairs, arriving on 15 May.
Elizabeth	(United Kingdom of Great Britain and Ireland) New Zealand	The schooner was wrecked on a reef between the Bay of Islands and Auckland. Her crew were rescued.
Elizabeth Ann	United Kingdom	The ship was driven ashore at Stornoway, Isle of Lewis, Outer Hebrides. She was refloated on 8 May.
Harriett	(United Kingdom of Great Britain and Ireland) New Zealand	The cutter was presumed to have foundered whilst on a voyage from Wellington to Auckland. No trace was ever found.
Hiram	Netherlands	The ship caught fire whilst on a voyage from Havre de Grâce, Seine-Inférieure, France to Veracruz, Mexico. She put into "St. Marks", where she was consequently condemned.
Lord Wenlock	United Kingdom	The ship was driven ashore on Saaremaa, Russia. She was on a voyage from Danzig to Saint Petersburg, Russia. Lord Wenlock was refloated and taken into Saint Petersburg for repairs. She arrived on 27 May.
Mary Atkinson	United Kingdom	The ship was driven ashore and severely damaged at Lowestoft, Suffolk. She was refloated on 11 May.
New Brunswick	United Kingdom	The ship ran aground off the Isle of Grain, Kent. She was on a voyage from Savannah, Georgia, United States to Chatham, Kent. New Brunswick was refloated on 21 May.
Olga	Russian Empire	The ship was driven ashore at "Alt Salls". She was refloated and taken into Pärnu, where she arrived on 16 May.
Olivia	Danzig	The barque ran aground on the Goodwin Sands, Kent, United Kingdom. she was refloated but subsequently came ashore between Landguard Fort and Felixtowe, Suffolk, United Kingdom.
Sarah	United Kingdom	The ship ran aground and sank at Galveston, Republic of Texas. She was on a voyage from Galveston to Liverpool, Lancashire.
