= Invincible Napoleon (1804 ship) =

History

France
- Name: Invincible Bonaparte
- Namesake: Napoleon Bonaparte
- Commissioned: Spring 1804
- Renamed: Invincible (1811)
- Captured: 1813

United Kingdom
- Name: Invincible
- Acquired: 1813 by capture (twice)
- Captured: 1813 (twice)

United States
- Name: Invincible
- Owner: Peter Destebecho, Jr.
- Acquired: 1813 by purchase of a prize
- Fate: Captured 1814

General characteristics
- Tons burthen: French:311-ton ("of load"); British:331 (bm)
- Complement: 1809:143; 1810:17 officers & 84 to 88 men; 1813:86; 1814:60
- Armament: 1809:14 guns; 1810:12 × 8-pounder + 2 × 7-pounder + 3 × 6-pounder guns; 1813:2 × 6-pounder + 2 × 12-pounder guns + 12 × 18-pounder carronades; 1813:4 × 6-pounder guns + 12 × 18-pounder carronades; 1814:16 carriage guns

Invincible Napoleon (or Invincible Bonaparte, or Invincible) was a three-masted French privateer commissioned in Bayonne in Spring 1804. She made numerous cruises until 1813–1814 when the British and the Americans repeatedly captured her. In her brief career as an American privateer she captured some 14 vessels. She finally ended up in British hands and was taken to Halifax, Nova Scotia as a prize.

== French privateer ==
Captain Martin Jorlis commissioned Invincible Napoleon in spring 1804.

She made another cruise in 1807 under Captain Michel Garat.

From November 1809 to March 1810 she was under the command of Captain François Dermit. Her owner was Maisonnave, Bayonne. She captured three prizes: Mary Anne, Marie Thérèse, and Huron. Invincible Napoleon captured Huron, Clarke, master, on 21 February 1810 at 41°N 34°W as Huron was sailing from Virginia to Cadiz. HMS Vestal recaptured Huron on 4 February; Huron arrived at Cowes on 16 February.

On 28 February 1810, Invincible Napoleon captured Bellona, Ross, master, at 36°N 35°W as Bellona was sailing from London to Amelia Island, Florida. The French set their prize on fire, scuttling her; Invincible Napoleon carried the crew into Bordeaux.

Later in 1810 Invincible Napoleon made another cruise under Captain Jorlis.

In January 1811, she took the name Invincible, and did several more cruises under Captain Jorlis between February 1811 and April 1813. Lloyd's List reported on 29 January 1811 that Invincible Napoleon had captured Hope, Orchard, master, as Hope was sailing from Newfoundland to Poole. However, HMS Armide recaptured Hope, which arrived at Plymouth on 23 January. On 25 January Invincible Bonaparte had captured Sir Sydney Smith, Lewis, master, at 25°N 47°W as Sir Sydney Smith was coming to England from Prince Edward Island. Invincible Bonaparte put on board Sir Sydney Smith the crews of three vessels that Invincible Bonaparte had captured and burnt:

- Priscilla, Connell, master, from Malta to London;
- Clyde, Norris, master, from St Michael; and
- Bolina, Atkins, master, from Plymouth to Boston.

Sir Sydney Smith arrived at Plymouth on 2 February. That same day Invincible Bonaparte captured Packet, from Boston to Liverpool. HMS Fortunee recaptured Packet and sent her into Cork.

Also in February Invincible Napoleon captured the American vessel Sally, Webber, master, as Sally was sailing from Charleston to Liverpool. The sloop of war HMS Acteon recaptured Sally, which arrived at Plymouth on 13 February.

== Captures and recaptures ==
Captured: On 17 April 1813, HMS Mutine captured Invincible, or Invincible Napoleon, off Spain. Mutine took her crew, some of whom were Americans, prisoner. Mutine had suffered only two men slightly wounded in the engagement. Mutine sent Invincible into Oporto.

Recaptured twice: The American privateer Alexander, of Salem, recaptured Invincible, or Invincible Napoleon, on 27 April 1813 at 47°46′N 18°00′W, or in the Channel. She had arrived within sight of Salem when the frigates Shannon and Tenedos on 16 May chased her on shore. She was out of range of the guns of the fort at Cape Ann and a few shots from the frigates dispersed the militia that had gathered. The frigates then sent their boats in and succeeded in recovering her. The British sent Invincible to Halifax, Nova Scotia.

Fourth capture: Invincible did not reach Halifax. The American privateer Young Teazer re-re-captured her and sent her into Portland, where she arrived around 1 June.

== American privateer & fifth capture ==
Invincible became an American privateer based in Salem, Massachusetts under the command of Captain Peter Destebecho, or New York, under the command and ownership of Peter Destebecho, Jr. She was commissioned on 18 December. Consequently, there are references to "Invincible, of Salem", or "Invincible of New York". She captured 14 or 15 vessels, of which only five reached American ports, in part because she didn't bother to take as prizes a number of small vessels.

American records report that Invincible captured one ship sailing from Liverpool to Antigua in ballast that she sent into Wilmington. This may have been Lady Prevost, of London. On March 3, 1814 while sailing towards the Leeward Islands they ran into another ship at 5 am and gave chase. After raising the American flag the other ship raised a British ensign they both got into medium range shootout at 7:30 am. At 11:30am they both got into musket range and the Invincible raised a red flag. The Invincible's crew soon boarded the British ship started an intense close quarters fighting but were beaten back after the British officer rallied his men. When the Americans got back on their ship then they both sailed off in opposite directions. The damage to the ship was massive much of it to the rigging and hull. During the fighting the ship lost 4 men killed, 7 men wounded. The British casualties is not known but according to the Americans it was high from the amount of blood rushing from the ship's drainage channels. The names of the 4 men killed were Thomas Green, William Barnes, Capt. John Heart and Charles Nurse who was African-American.

Lloyd's List reported on 5 April 1814 that in December the American privateer Invincible Napoleon had captured Prince Regent, Hewson, master, as Prince Regent was sailing from Halifax, Nova Scotia, to Nassau, but had then given Prince Regent up. Prince Regent arrived at Nassau on 6 January 1814. Before sending Prince Regent on her way, Invincible took Prince Regent's armament.

Invincible captured other vessels as well:

- Nimble, carrying West Indian produce and sent into Teneriffe, where she was found not seaworthy and the cargo was disposed of;
- Cutter Lyon, with dry goods and hardware, divested and released;
- Brig Portsea, of eight guns;
- Brig Conway, of ten guns, carrying dry goods, and sent to Cambden, Maine, after having her cargo removed; (Note: Conway, Harrison, master, had been captured on 5 April as she was sailing from London to Jacmel. She arrived at Cambden on 21 April. Before sending her into Cambden, Invincible took out 44 trunks, 35 cases, and 23 bales.)
- Schooner Francis and Lucy, with fish, oil, and lumber, and converted into a cartel to repatriate the crews of vessels Invincible had captured; (Note: Francis and Lucy, Gruchy, master, had left Halifax for Barbados but on 3 March had had to put back leaky. She was captured on 5 April.) and,
- Brig Margaretta, carrying wine. (Note: Invincible captured Margaretta near Teneriffe and within Spanish jurisdiction, and so gave her up. When Invincible put into Santa Cruz de Tenerife the governor welcomed her warmly.)

Invincible then put into Charleston, South Carolina, "full of valuable goods." After sailing from Charleston, Invincible captured six more British vessels before the British captured her:

- Brig Daniel, of Newfoundland;
- William, from St Andrews to Greenock;
- Vittoria, from Jersey to Newfoundland;
- Adventure, from Bermuda to Halifax;
- Wanderer, from Newfoundland to Corunna; and
- Helen, Holmes, master, from Havana to Greenock.

Armide captured Invincible on 16 August. Endymion and Pique were in company with Armide at the time. (Note: A first-class share of the prize money for the privateers Invincible and Herald (captured the day before), was £105 9s 3½d; a sixth-class share, that of an ordinary seaman, was worth 12s 10½d.)

Invincible arrived at Halifax on 21 August. Invincible had been sailing from Charleston to New York when the British captured her after a long chase during which she had thrown ten of her guns overboard.

HMS Wasp recaptured Helen, which then arrived at Halifax on 18 August. HMS Tenedos recaptured Wanderer and bought her into Halifax on 22 August. Lloyd's List further reported that Invincible gave up her other four prizes to their masters and crews.

The records of the Halifax Vice admiralty court report that Invincible was carrying 314 tierces and 103 half tierces of rice, 77 boxes of sugar, and cargo from Helen.
