= Memphis (1805 ship) =

History

United Kingdom
- Name: Memphis
- Namesake: Memphis, the name of various figures in Greek mythology
- Owner: Jacobs & Co.
- Builder: France
- Acquired: 1805 by purchase of a prize
- Fate: Foundered on or after 25 July 1807

General characteristics
- Tons burthen: 263 (bm)
- Complement: 25
- Armament: 2 × 12-pounder guns + 16 × 12-pounder guns "of the New Construction"

Memphis was a French prize that in 1805 became a whaler in the British Southern Whale Fishery. She made one voyage as a whaler and then disappeared in 1807 early in the outbound leg of her second whaling voyage.

== Career ==
Memphis entered Lloyd's Register (LR) in 1806 with Hitchman, master, Jacobs & Co., owners, and trade London–South Seas. She was a French prize. Captain Thomas Hitchman acquired a letter of Marque on 6 December 1805. In late 1805 or early 1806 he sailed her on a whaling voyage. On her way home she was at St Helena on 6 January 1807. Lloyd's List (LL) reported on 20 February that Memphis, Heitchman, master, had been driven ashore at Oldhaven, but that she was expected to be gotten off. Four days later LL reported that she had indeed been refloated. Memphis arrived back at London on 13 February.

== Fate ==
On 19 June 1807, Memphis sailed from Gravesend for Montevideo. On 24 June she passed by Portsmouth, as did Hero, Gardner, master, and Pandora, Anderson, master, all three whalers bound for the River Plate. On 13 July the three vessels passed by Madeira, still bound for the Plate.

Memphis was last sighted on 25 July 1807 while sailing from Madeira to the South Seas. There was no further trace of her thereafter; she was presumed to have foundered with the loss of all hands.
