= Nimble (1802 ship) =

British merchant ship (1802–1840)

History

United Kingdom
- Name: Nimble
- Builder: Hull
- Launched: 1802
- Captured: 7 January 1814 and recaptured

General characteristics
- Tons burthen: Originally: 188 (bm); 1806: 257 (bm)
- Sail plan: Schooner
- Complement: 20, or 15 at capture
- Armament: 10 × 6-pounder guns

Nimble was built in Kingston upon Hull in 1802. She traded with Portugal, first from Hull and then from Liverpool. She was lengthened in 1806. Later, she traded between London and Brazil, and then London and the West Indies. An American privateer captured her in 1814. She was recaptured and then disappeared from ship arrival and departure (SAD) data.

== Career ==
Nimble first appeared in Lloyd's Register (LR) in 1802.

Year	Master	Owner	Trade	Source
1802	T.Bentley	Capt. & Co.	Hull–Lisbon	LR
1803	T.Bentley; R.Cudd	Capt. & Co. J.Tomlinson	Hull–Lisbon; Liverpool–Viana	LR

Captain Richard Cudd acquired a letter of marque on 10 June 1803.

On 24 January 1806 Lloyd's List reported that Nimble, Cudd, master, from Oporto to Liverpool, was on shore at Carnarvon Bay and waterlogged.

Later in 1806 Tomlinson & Co. had Nimble lengthened.

Year	Master	Owner	Trade	Source
1807	Cuddy	Tomlinson	Liverpool–Lisbon	LR; lengthened 1806
1812	J. Cudd	Tomlinson	London–Havana	LR; lengthened 1806
1813	J. Cudd	Tomlinson	London–Bahia	LR; lengthened 1806

As Nimble was returning to Liverpool from Brazil in 1813, her pumps failed. Cudd constructed a new one by taking a spar top-mast, cutting it in half, and chiseling out the interior to the bore of the pump. He then put the two sides together, caulking them with oakum, and sealing them with tar. He then reinforced the tube by binding it tightly. The result was a serviceable pump. Cudd wrote a letter, published in a newspaper, that described his expedient so that other mariners might learn from his experience.

On 8 November 1813 Nimble sailed from St Thomas with the fleet returning to England. However, she was among a small number of vessels that had not yet arrived in England by January 1814. In March she still had not been heard from.

== Fate ==
Lloyd's List reported that an American privateer had captured Nimble, Cudd, master, in January 1814 and sent her into Santa Cruz de Tenerife.

Nimble's captor was the United States privateer Invincible. (Note: Invincible, of 331 or 362 tons (bm), Peter Destebecho, Jr., master, was armed with 16 guns and had a crew of 60 men. HMS Armide captured Invincible on 16 August. Endymion and Pique were in company with Armide at the time.) That is clear; however, what happened next is more confusing. Numerous accounts, using the same wording, state that Invincible had sent Nimble into Tenerife where her cargo was sold as Nimble was not seaworthy.

In July 1814 Lloyd's List reported that Nimble, Chubb, master, which had been taken into Tenerife, had been recaptured and taken into Bermuda. Online resources do not identify the recaptor, or how Nimble came to be at sea. The answer is that Captain Destebecho, of Invincible had captured Nimble, of 10 guns and 15 men, Cudd, master, on 7 January. She had been carrying sugar and coffee from St Lucie to Liverpool. Destebecho took off part of her cargo and then put a prize crew on Nimble, sending her to the United States.

On 27 January Destebecho captured Lion, Jackson, master, which had been sailing from Bristol to the West Indies. Destebecho took out part of Lion's cargo and then put 18 prisoners aboard her, after which he permitted Lion to proceed. Lion arrived at Palma. (Note: Lion, or Lyon, was a cutter carrying dry goods, hardware, and the like.) Destebecho took the most valuable parts of her cargo and then gave her up.

Despite her recapture, and although Lloyd's Register and the Register of Shipping continued to carry Nimble, Cudd, master, for a number of years with unchanged data, she did not reappear in Lloyd's List's SAD data.
