= Hero (1807 ship) =

History

United Kingdom
- Name: Hero
- Owner: T.Ayles & Co.
- Builder: South America
- Launched: c.1795
- Acquired: 1806
- Captured: January 1809

General characteristics
- Tons burthen: 266 (bm)
- Complement: 30
- Armament: 16 × 12&6&4-pounder cannons + 4 swivel guns; 16 × 4-pounder + 2 × 6-pounder + 8 × 12-pounder guns

Hero was built in South America around 1795. She first appeared in Lloyd's Register (LR) in 1807. Captain Barnabas Gardner acquired a letter of marque on 15 June 1807. He then sailed her as a whaler British in the British Southern Whale Fishery. A privateer captured her off Peru in January 1809.

Hero entered LR in 1807 with Gardner, master, T.Ayles & Co., owners, and trade London–South Seas.

On 24 June 1807 Hero passed by Portsmouth, as did Memphis, Hitchman, master, and Pandora, Anderson, master, all three whalers bound for the River Plate. On 13 July the three vessels passed by Madeira, still bound for the Plate.

Hero and Pandour arrived at Montevideo on 2 September and sailed for their destinations on 11 September. Memphis never arrived.

The privateer Fleche captured Hero, of London, Gardner, master, in January 1809 off Tombaz, on the coast of Peru. Hero struck after an engagement of an hour and a half. Alternatively, the action may have taken place off Coquimbo.
