= HMS Valorous (1804) =

Sloop of the Royal Navy

History

United Kingdom
- Name: HMS Valorous
- Ordered: 29 May 1804
- Builder: Blunt, Hull
- Launched: November 1804
- Out of service: Army depot ship 1810 (1816?)
- Fate: Sold 7 May 1817

General characteristics
- Class & type: Combatant-class sloop
- Type: Pram
- Tons burthen: 416 40/94 bm
- Length: 120 ft (37 m) o.a.; 99 ft 6 in (30.33 m) p.p.
- Beam: 28 ft (8.5 m)
- Draught: 11 ft 3 in (3.43 m)
- Sail plan: Full-rigged ship
- Complement: 121
- Armament: Rated as "18 guns"; 20 (or 22) × 24-pounder carronades

The first HMS Valorous was a sixth-rate Combatant-class sloop of the Royal Navy. She was rated as "18 guns" but carried twenty (or twenty-two) 24-pounder carronades.

She was built in Hull as one of a class of three (the others being Dauntless and Combatant) and launched in 1804. Designed by John Staniforth MP, they were flush-decked, shallow draught and (for their dimensions) heavily armed. Rated as a sloop, she had a design based on the Danish Praam (English 'Pram'), allowing the combination of heavy armament with a draught of only 11 feet. Her design may well have been influenced by the flush-decked, shallow-draught vessels of Napoleon's invasion fleet, although Valorous and her sisters were significantly larger.

Valorous entered service in 1805, with the anti-invasion flotillas stationed in The Downs. In the spring of 1807 she and her sisters were ordered to the Baltic, where their characteristics would be of value as convoy escorts and particularly in support of operations ashore. She became an Army depot ship in 1810 (possibly 1816?) and was sold on 7 May 1817.
