= Majestic (1804 ship) =

History

United Kingdom
- Name: Majestic
- Owner: Edward and Aaron Chapman, and Robert Campion
- Builder: Holt and Richardson, Whitby
- Launched: 1804
- Fate: Burnt 20 October 1808

General characteristics
- Tons burthen: 377 (bm)
- Propulsion: Sails
- Armament: 1805:14 × 18-pounder carronades + 2 × 6-pounder chase guns; 1810:8 × 18-pounder carronades

Majestic was launched at Whitby in 1804. She served the British government as a transport until she burned at Barbados on 20 October 1808, due to an act of carelessness by a crew member.

Majestic first appeared in the Register of Shipping (RS) in 1805 with Coults, master, Chapman, owner, and trade Government service.

On 6 January 1809 Lloyd's List reported that the transport Majestic had burnt to her waterline at Barbados.

Majestic was lying in Carlisle Bay off Barbados on 20 October 1808 when she caught fire. The cause was believed to have been a candle put on a cask of rum that then ignited fumes. There were some 170 officers and men of the York Rangers on board, all of whom were saved, though they lost their arms and equipment. Boats towed Majestic out of the bay where she was allowed to drift to leeward. Three of her crew died in the fire. The crew members that died, a man and two boys, suffocated on board. The mate suffered severe burns and died later.

The Register of Shipping for 1810 showed Majestic with Harland, master, Chapman & Co., owners, and trade Government service. It carried the annotation "BURNT".
