= HMS Dauntless (1804) =

Sloop of the Royal Navy

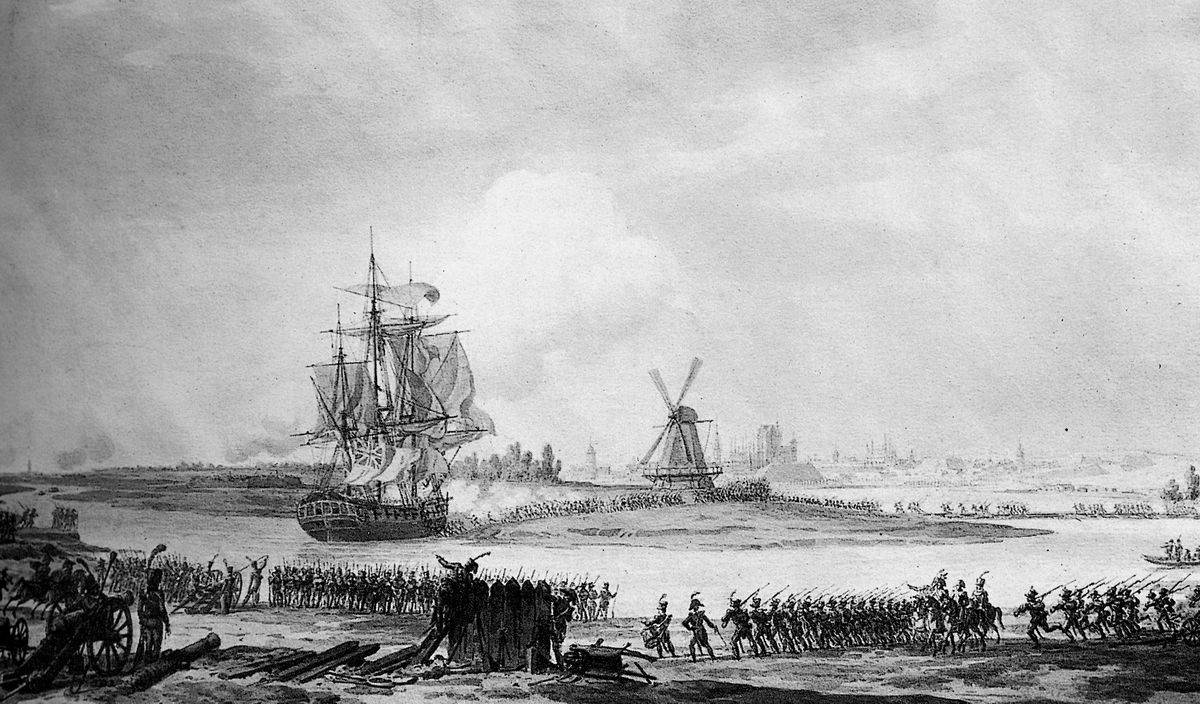
- HMS Dauntless aground, by Benjamin Zix

History

United Kingdom
- Name: HMS Dauntless
- Builder: William Gibson Shipyard; North Bridge yard, Hull (Note: William Gibson shipbuilders was located at the former Blaydes shipyard (North Bridge Dry Dock) in Hull, near to the entrance to Queen's Dock, William Gibson moved to the larger Union Dock in 1805.)
- Launched: November 1804
- Commissioned: March 1805
- Captured: 16 May 1807

France
- Name: Sans Peur
- Acquired: 16 May 1807 by capture
- Fate: Possibly left for the Prussians in July 1807

General characteristics
- Class & type: Combatant-class sloop
- Type: Pram
- Displacement: 450 tons (French)
- Tons burthen: 426 40/94 (bm)
- Length: 117 ft 10 in (35.92 m)(overall); 100 ft 6 in (30.63 m) p.p.
- Beam: 28 ft 3 in (8.61 m)
- Depth of hold: 11 ft 3 in (3.43 m)
- Sail plan: Full-rigged ship
- Complement: 121
- Armament: 22 × 24-pounder carronades

The first HMS Dauntless was a sixth-rate Combatant-class sloop of the Royal Navy. She was launched in 1804 and the French captured her in 1807 at Danzig. The French Navy took her into service as Sans Peur, but her subsequent fate is unknown.

== Design ==
She was built in Hull at the William Gibson Shipyard, as one of a class of three (the others being Combatant and Valorous) and launched in 1804. Designed by John Staniforth MP, they were flush-decked, shallow draught and (for their dimensions) heavily armed. Rated as a sloop, she had a design based on the Danish Praam (English Pram), allowing the combination of heavy armament with a draught of only 11 feet. Her design may well have been influenced by the flush-decked, shallow draught vessels of Napoleon's invasion fleet, although Dauntless and her sisters were significantly larger. The Royal Navy rated her for purposes of command as an 18-gun sloop, but as a captain's command until 1806.

== Career ==
Captain Hugh Pigot commissioned Dauntless in March 1805, serving with the anti-invasion flotillas stationed in The Downs. In July she was under the command of Captain Charles Jones on the North Sea station.

In March 1806 Commander William Cook replaced Jones. However, in October 1806, Commander Christopher Strachey replaced Cook.

In the spring of 1807 she and her sisters were ordered to the Baltic where their characteristics would be of value as convoy escorts and particularly in support of operations ashore. On 13 May Dauntless was ordered to sail up the Vistula and break through the French armies besieging Danzig (now Gdansk) in order to supply the encircled Prussians with 600 barrels of gunpowder. Heavily laden and making upriver under a press of sail, Dauntless became unmanageable and broached to. Running hard aground on a sandbank within easy range of French artillery, she suffered an hour's bombardment before surrendering. Napoleon himself is reputed to have said that her resistance "was worthy of being placed on the page of history". Strachey then remained a French prisoner until the end of the war. At the obligatory court martial her captain, Christopher Strachey, was honourably acquitted of all blame for the surrender of his ship.

== Fate ==
The French Navy took Dauntless into service as Sans Peur. Her ultimate fate is unknown, but she may have fallen into Prussian hands in July when Napoleon handed Danzig over to the Prussians.
