= French corvette Lynx (1804) =

Lynx
History

France
- Name: Lynx
- Ordered: 21 February 1803
- Builder: Jean Baudry, Bayonne
- Laid down: May 1803
- Launched: 17 April 1804
- Commissioned: 14 June 1804
- Captured: 21 January 1807

United Kingdom
- Name: Heureux
- Stricken: 1814
- Honours and awards: Naval General Service Medal with clasp "28 Nov. Boat Service 1808"
- Fate: Sold 1814

General characteristics
- Type: Lynx-class brig
- Displacement: 402 tons
- Tons burthen: 33648/94 (bm)
- Length: 93 ft 10 in (28.60 m) (gundeck); 78 ft 8 3/8 in (23.987 m)
- Beam: 29 ft 6 in (8.99 m)
- Depth of hold: 8 ft 6 in (2.59 m)
- Sail plan: Brig rigged
- Complement: French service:94 men British service:100
- Armament: French service: 16 × 6-pounder guns; British service: 2 × 6-pounder bow chasers + 14 × 24-pounder carronades

Lynx (or Linx) was a 16-gun brig of the French Navy, name ship of her two-vessel class of brigs, and launched at Bayonne on 17 April 1804. The British captured her in 1807 and named her HMS Heureux. After service in the Caribbean that earned her crew two medals, including one for a boat action in which her captain was killed, she was laid up in 1810 and sold in 1814.

== French service ==
Lynx was the name ship of her two-vessel class of brigs. She was built to plans by Pierre-Jacques-Nicolas Rolland. The French Navy commissioned her in June 1804 under Lieutenant Fargenel. She took part in the Trafalgar Campaign, ferrying dispatches between Fort de France and France, where she arrived on 10 July 1805.

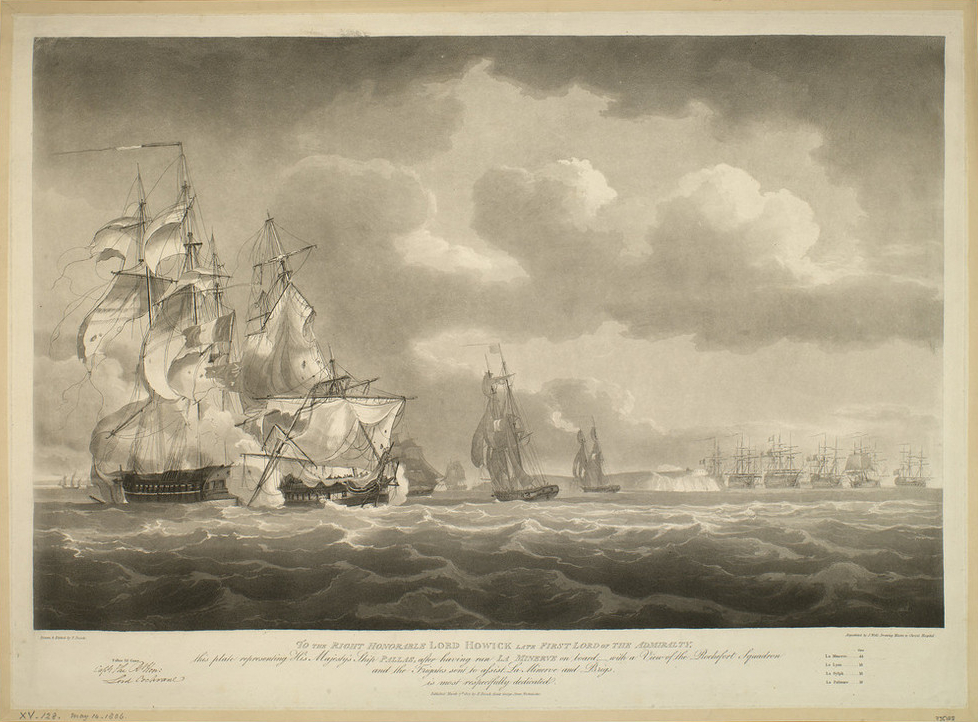
A view of HMS Pallas passing under the batteries of the Île-d'Aix on 14 May 1806. Pallas (second right), after having run La Minerve on board. Lynx, a part of the French Rochefort Squadron, attends.

She was then attached to a five-frigate squadron under Commodore Eleonore-Jean-Nicolas Soleil, tasked with ferrying supplies and troops to the French West Indies. A British squadron intercepted the convoy, which led to the action of 25 September 1806, where the British captured four of the frigates. Lynx, the frigate Thétis, and the corvette Sylphe escaped, with Lynx managing to outrun HMS Windsor Castle. Lynx finally arrived in Martinique on 31 October.

== Capture ==
The boats of Galatea, under Lieutenant William Coombe, captured Lynx off Les Saintes on 21 January 1807. The boats, manned with five officers, 50 seamen and 20 marines, had to row for eight hours, mainly in the blazing sun, to catch her. During the action Coombe, who had already lost a leg in a previous action, received a musket ball through the thigh above the previous amputation. The British only succeeded in boarding Lynx on their third attempt and a desperate struggle occurred on deck as the crew of the Lynx outnumbered their attackers. The British lost nine men killed and 22 wounded, including Coombe. The French had 14 killed and 20 wounded, including the captain.

The Lloyd's Patriotic Fund awarded Coombe and several of the other British officers swords worth 50 guineas, but Coombe did not live to receive his. The surviving officers were promoted; Coombe was promoted to commander but appointed as captain of Hart, not Lynx. Hart was a lesser vessel than Lynx and Coombe complained to the admiral of the station and then to the Admiralty. The Admiralty reversed the appointments, which led to Coombe fighting a duel with the relegated captain. In 1847 the Admiralty issued the Naval General Service Medal with clasp "21 Jan. Boat Service 1807" to all surviving claimants of the action.

The British took Lynx into service as HMS Heureux as the Royal Navy already had a Lynx, and had lost an Heureux the year before.

== British service ==
Heureux was commissioned in Antigua in April 1807 under Coombe.

Coombe was killed in the early morning of 29 November 1808. He had received information that seven French vessels were lying under the protection of two batteries in the harbour at Mahaut, Guadeloupe and decided to attack them. Coombe took three boats and 63 men who rowed six hours to reach Mahaut at about midnight. The cutting out party then waited for four hours at their oars until just after the moon set at 4 am on 29 November. Coombe, with 19 men, boarded and carried a schooner armed with two guns and with a crew of 39 men. After a few minutes of desperate fighting the attackers prevailed. Meanwhile, Lieutenant Daniel Lawrence and the remainder of the party landed and spiked three 24-pounders in the batteries, before boarding a brig. On the way out the prizes grounded, making them ideal targets for small arms fire and the three field pieces that the French had brought down to the shore. As Coombe was about to abandon the prizes, a 24-pound shot struck him on the left side, killing him almost immediately. A musket ball wounded Lawrence in the forearm. Still, he extricated all the men without further casualties. In 1847 the Admiralty issued the Naval General Service Medal with clasp "28 Nov. Boat Service 1808" to all surviving claimants of the action.

Commander John Ellis Watt replaced Coombe. Captain Michael Halliday replaced Watt in 1809.

== Fate ==
Heureux arrived in Plymouth on 20 January 1810 and was laid up in ordinary. She was sold there on 1 September 1814 for £460 and was broken up.
