= Lynx-class brig =

Class overview
- Name: Lynx
- Operators: French Navy; Royal Navy
- Planned: 2
- Completed: 2
- Lost: 2 by capture

Pierre-Jacques-Nicolas Rolland designed the Lynx-class of 16-gun brigs for the French Navy. Only two were built and the British Royal Navy captured both.

- Lynx (or Linx) was launched at Bayonne in 1804. The British captured her in 1807 and named her HMS Heureux. After service in the Caribbean that earned her crew two medals, including one for a boat action in which her captain was killed, she was laid up in 1810 and sold in 1814.
- Actéon launched at Rochefort in 1804. The British captured her in 1805, named her HMS Acteon (or Actaeon), but laid her up. The navy finally commissioned her in 1809. She was at the British invasion of Île de France and later served in the Channel, the North Sea, the Baltic, and the Chesapeake. She was broken up in 1816.
