= HMS Acteon (1805) =

Brig of the Royal Navy

History

France
- Name: Actéon,
- Ordered: 21 February 1803 at Bayonne
- Builder: Rolland, Rochefort Dockyard
- Laid down: 24 June 1803
- Launched: 10 July 1804
- Captured: 27 September 1805

United Kingdom
- Name: HMS Acteon
- Acquired: 1805, by capture
- Fate: Broken up, 1816

General characteristics
- Class & type: Lynx-class brig
- Tons burthen: 33468/94 (bm)
- Length: Overall:94 ft 0 in (28.7 m); Keel:63 ft 6 5/8 in (19.4 m)
- Beam: 29 ft 3 in (8.9 m)
- Depth of hold: 8 ft 1 in (2.5 m)
- Sail plan: Brig
- Complement: French:84 126 at capture; British:121
- Armament: French:16 × 6-pounder guns; British:14 × 24-pounder carronades + 2 × 6-pounder guns

HMS Acteon (or Actaeon), was the brig Actéon, launched in France in 1804 as the second of the two-ship Lynx-class. The British Royal Navy captured her in 1805 but laid her up. The Navy finally commissioned her in 1809. She was at the British invasion of Île de France and later served in the Channel, the North Sea, the Baltic, and the Chesapeake. She was broken up in 1816.

== French service and capture ==
She was built to plans by Pierre-Jacques-Nicolas Rolland and commissioned on 14 June 1804. She was stationed in Île-d'Aix Roads.

On 11 January 1805, she departed Rochefort under Lieutenant Depoge to join up with Admiral Missiessy's squadron, bound for the Caribbean. She returned to Rochefort on 20 May.

French records state that she was captured off the Gironde, on 27 September,> or on 11 Vendémiaire An 14 (3 October 1805), by HMS Egyptienne.

British records state that on 2 October 1805 HMS Egyptienne captured the French brig-sloop Actéon, under Capitaine de frégate Depoge, off Rochefort. She was armed with sixteen 6-pounder guns and had a crew of 126 men. Actéon had on board a colonel and some recruits, as well as arms and clothing for a regiment in the West Indies. The navy took Actéon into service as HMS Acteon.

== British service ==
After Actéon arrived at Portsmouth the navy laid her up in ordinary.

In February 1809 Commander Ralph Viscount Neville commissioned her at Portsmouth. Between June and September Acteon underwent a Very Small Repair.

Plover, under the command of Commander Phillip Browne, was off the Scilly Isles on 6 November, when she sighted a brig (Acteon) chasing a lugger. Plover joined in, with Orestes joining later. After a chase of almost four hours, Plover came alongside the lugger, which surrendered. The lugger proved to be the French privateer Lézard, of Saint Malo. She was pierced for 14 guns, but had none aboard when captured. She and her crew of 57 men had sailed from Île de Batz the night before but had not made any capture. Browne credited Acteon and Orestes with having blocked Lézard's escape. (Note: Lézard was a lugger commissioned in Saint-Malo as a privateer in December 1807 under Joseph Lesnard, with 54 men and 14 guns. She made her first cruise from December 1807 to April 1808; her second under François Godefroy-La Truite (or La Truille) lasted from November 1808 to some time in 1809, with 56 men and 14 guns. She made her third cruise under Captain Le Landais with 70 men and 14 carronades from October 1809 until her capture by HMS Plover on 6 November.) Lastly, Browne further reported that the three British men-of-war had recaptured the English ship Weymouth, from Gibraltar, shortly before she could reach Aber Wrac'h. Weymouth, Llewellyn, master, had been captured on 4 November at 50°30′N 7°15′E. After her recapture she arrived at Scilly where she described her captor as having had six guns and a crew of 63 men. (Note: Weymouth had been launched on the Thames in 1792 and had a burthen of 152 tons. Her owner was Rhodes & Co., her armament consisted of two 4-pounder guns, and her trade was London–Malta.)

In February 1810 there occurred an unfortunate incident of friendly fire. As the packet Princess Elizabeth, Kidd, master, was sailing to Lisbon she encountered a naval brig and an engagement developed that lasted about two-and-a-half hours. Eventually Kidd decided that further resistance was useless and ceased firing. When the boarding party from the brig arrived at Princess Elizabeth both sides realized the mistake. The brig was Acteon. Kidd had prepared the mails for jettisoning but had not yet given the order that it be thrown overboard when it became clear that the brig was English. Fortunately, there were no casualties aboard the packet and no loss of mail. Kidd believed that it was possible that there were wounded aboard Acteon. Princess Elizabeth arrived at Lisbon on 28 February and was due to sail back to London on 4 March. (Note: Princess Elizabeth, of 189 tons (bm), had been launched in 1795 and was armed with four 6-pounder guns. She had just become a Falmouth packet.)

On 23 May the French ship Susan and Sarah arrived at Plymouth from Île de France. She and her "very valuable Cargo" were a prize to Acteon.

On 15 July Nivelle sailed Acteon for the Cape of Good Hope. By 21 November she was off the island of Rodrigues preparing for a joint naval and military expedition to take Île de France. The invasion fleet, under Admiral Albemarle Bertie, arrived at Île de France on the 28th; the capitulation was signed on the 3 December.

After the capture of the island Neville received promotion to post captain and transferred to take command of Boadicea. Admiral Bertie appointed his nephew, Bertie Cornelius Cator, to command of Acteon.

Earlier Lieutenant Bertie Cator had been appointed to command the transport "Bombay Anna". He moved from temporary command of HMS Otter and by some accounts commanded Anna during the invasion. (The navy had temporarily engaged four transports as hired armed ships and put naval officers in charge of each. (Note: In 1816 the Admiralty paid prize money for the campaign, and the invasion. A first-class share, that of a captain or commander, was worth £153 5s 5 1/2d. A second-class share, that of a lieutenant, was worth £29 2s 5 1/4d. It is not clear whether Cator qualified for a first-class share as commander of Anna, despite being a lieutenant. A sixth-class share, that of an ordinary seaman, was worth £1 18s 0 3/4d. In 1828 there was a fourth and final payment. A first-class share was worth £29 19s 5 1/4d, and a second-class share was worth £6 7s 7d. A sixth-class share was worth 8s 2 1/2d.)

Bertie sent Cator and Acteon to England with duplicate dispatches announcing the successful end to the campaign.

In February 1811 the French privateer Invincible Napoleon captured the American vessel Sally, Webber, master, as Sally was sailing from Charleston to Liverpool. Acteon recaptured Sally, which arrived at Plymouth on 13 February.

That same day Cator arrived at the Admiralty; it turned out that he was the first with the good news. The Admiralty awarded him a gratuity of £500 for his good news.

Acteon's next mission was to carry a single letter to Calcutta and return with an answer. The sickly state of her crew meant that she often spent weeks sitting with the result that the voyage took 10 months.

Acteon then cruised off Cherbourg and the Norwegian coast. On 24 January 1813 Minerva, Patterson, master, and Christiansand, Sinus, master, arrived at Hull. They were prizes to Acteon, which detained Minerva as Minerva was sailing from Gothenburg to Boston. At some point Acteon escorted the Russian fleet from the Baltic to Gothenburg. She was then caught up in severe winter gales on the Norwegian coast and sustained some damage that required her to put into Sheerness for repairs.

Later in 1813 Acteon sailed to North America. On 22 September she landed marines at Lynhaven Bay by Hampton Roads. There, after a short action with American dragoons and infantry, the marines destroyed a barracks and its military stores, captured nine American soldiers, and killed and wounded several others. British casualties were one marine severely wounded.

During the very severe winter of 1813 Acteon provided watering parties for the British squadron blockading the Chesapeake. She also assisted in the capture and destruction of numerous coasting vessels.

Between 22 and 28 November she joined forces with Sophie to destroy two schooners and a sloop and capture three schooners and two sloops. All these vessels were coasters. The first was the New York, of 28 tons and four men. Then came the Phoebe, of 48 tons and five men. Next came the sloop Caroline, of 45 tons and five men. The fourth was the schooner Fredricksburgh, of 38 tons and two men. The fifth and sixth were the sloop Polly and the schooner Peggy, both of which the British burnt. The seventh was the schooner Lucy and Sally, of 48 tons and four men, sailing from Fredericksburgh to Onnacohe. The last was the schooner Poor Jack, of 26 tons and three men, also sailing from Fredericksburgh to Onnacohe.

In December, Acteon, again working with Sophie, destroyed or captured seven small prizes. On 11 December the burnt a schooner of 37 tons. The next day they captured the 76-ton schooner Erie and its crew of nine men. (Erie, under the command of John Hearn, had been sailing from Havana to Baltimore with a cargo of sugar and coffee. The British unloaded the cargo and afterwards sent it to Bermuda, thereafter employing Erie as a tender to the British squadron in the Chesapeake. There Erie too captured several prizes.) On 12 December, Sophie and Acteon burnt two small schooners, one of 25 and one of 60 tons. Then on the 16th they burnt Little Elenea, of 59 tons and two men, sailing from Charleston to Baltimore. On the same day they also burnt a 69-ton sloop.

Lastly, on 23 December Acteon and Sophie captured two vessels of 240 tons (bm). George and Betsey were both sailing from Baltimore to Lisbon.

Acteon returned to Norwegian waters in 1814. On 7 June Cator received promotion to post captain. Commander John Ross (later an Arctic explorer), replaced Cator in command of Acteon.

Acteon was part of a squadron of five vessels that detained Panther, Gegollae (or Gezoline), master, which was sailing from Martinique to Dunkirk. Panther arrived at Plymouth on 26 June 1815.

== Fate ==
The principal officers and commissioners of His Majesty's Navy offered the brig Acteon, of 353 tons, for sale at Portsmouth on 11 January 1816. Acteon failed to sell on several sale dates. She was surveyed with the result that on 16 October the surveyors found that she was so decayed that she was no longer seaworthy. She was then broken up.
