= French brig Pandour (1804) =

Pandour
History

France
- Name: Pandour
- Namesake: The pandours (e.g. Trenck's Pandurs)
- Ordered: 22 March 1803
- Builder: Louis, Antoine, & Mathurin Crucy, Basse-Indre
- Laid down: December 1803
- Launched: 23 June 1804
- Commissioned: 7 November 1804
- Captured: 1 May 1806

United Kingdom
- Name: Pandour
- Acquired: 1807 by purchase
- Fate: Lost 1809

General characteristics
- Class & type: Curieux-class brig
- Displacement: 290 tons (French)
- Tons burthen: 308-310 (bm)
- Length: 27.93 m (91 ft 8 in) (overall); 23.39 m (76 ft 9 in) (keel)
- Beam: 8.45 m (27 ft 9 in)
- Sail plan: Brig
- Complement: French service: 94; Whaler: 40
- Armament: French service: 18 × 6-pounder guns; Whaler: 20 × 18 & 12-pounder guns; 22 × 12-pounder guns (NC); (Note: NC means "short guns of the New Construction".) 16 × 12-pounder carronades + 2 × 9-pounder guns

The French brig Pandour was a brig of the French Navy launched in 1804 that the Royal Navy captured in 1806. In 1807 she became a whaler in the South Seas Fisheries, but was lost in late 1809.

== French career and capture ==
Capitaine de frégate Chaumont-Quitry was appointed on 15 July to command Pandour while she was still under construction at Nantes. Capitaine de frégate Hulot-Gury was appointed on 19 December to replace him. However, shortly after her commissioning, Pandour sailed from Mindin to Lorient. On 23 December Pandour had to leave Mindin roads to escape a wind breaking her cables and driving her ashore. The only people on board at the time were her captain, another officer, and 19 of her crew; the rest were on shore gathering supplies as her fitting out was not yet complete. Pandour sailed to Lorient where the rest of her crew joined her after having come from Paimbœuf by road with some of the supplies that they had gathered. Hulot-Gury took command on 2 January 1805. On 30 January though, Pandour was stripped of most of her crew to provide fill out the crew of Palinure. To replace her losses, the government sent some soldiers and police to Nantes where there were 80 recruits incarcerated in prisons, officially designated caserns. The guards were to escort the recruits to Lorient and prevent any from deserting. Then on 31 January orders came that both Palinure and Pandour were to be prepared to carry duplicate dispatches to Martinique. To fill out the crews men were drafted from other naval vessels and sixteen 6-pounder guns were placed on each of the two brigs. The next day they both set sail.

Hulot-Gury remained Pandour's captain until 12 June. Then between 9 July and 14 August lieutenant de vaisseau auxiliaire Bourdé-Villeaubert was in command. Pandour was stationed at Lorient, but in the first half of 1805 sailed to Guadeloupe, returning first to Santander, and then Rochefort, Charente-Maritime, via Bayonne.

French records indicate that between 20 October 1805 and 24 May 1806, Pandour was under the command of capitaine de frégate Michel Philippe Malingre, and that she transported a prisoner from Guadeloupe to Ténériffe. On her outward voyage she captured a British merchant vessel that she took into Guadelope.

British records report that on 1 May HMS Druid, Captain Philip Broke, chased Pandour, bound for France from Senegal, 160 miles into Rear Admiral Charles Stirling's squadron where she was brought to; Druid had to share the prize money with Stirling's entire squadron and so earned relatively little for the long chase. Pandour was under the command of M. Malingre and had a crew of 114 men. She had been armed with eighteen 6-pounder guns, but her crew had thrown two of the guns overboard during the chase. Stirling instructed Broke to bring her into Plymouth, where they arrived on 9 May.

== Whaler ==
The whaling company of Mather & Co. purchased Pandour, and initially her master was S. Chance. Pandour entered Lloyd's Register (LR) in 1807 with Gardner, master, T.Ayles & Co., owners, and trade London–South Seas.

Captain Thomas Anderson received a letter of marque on 12 June 1807. Pandour then sailed to the South Seas Fisheries.

On 24 June 1807 Pandour passed by Portsmouth, as did Memphis, Hitchman, master, and Hero, Gardner, master, all three whalers bound for the River Plate. On 13 July the three vessels passed by Madeira, still bound for the Plate.

Hero and Pandour arrived at Montevideo on 2 September and sailed for their destinations on 11 September. Memphis never arrived.

On 12 October 1808 Pandour and the brig Antelope, John LePelley, master, captured the Spanish ship Nueva Castor, Ramón Goycochea, master. Nueva Castor had left Valparaiso the day before. Goycochea did not resist, and showed his British captors documents attesting to the signing of an armistice between Spain and Britain. Anderson and LePelley ignored the documents and proceeded to loot Nueva Castor of her cargo. They also threw overboard those of her guns they could not transfer to their vessels. The British then allowed Goycochea and Nueva Castor to sail on to Callao.

In August 1809 Lloyd's List reported that Anderson, the supercargo, and 16 men on Pandour were killed when Pandour and Neptunus, of Greenock, Smith, master, were taken at Cape Horn. However, a few days later, Lloyd's List reported that Anderson and Pandour had arrived at Rio de Janeiro on 10 August. The Register of Shipping for 1809 annotated her name with the word "captured".

Still, in February 1810, Lloyd's List reported that Pandour, Anderson, master, and Ferdinand VIII, from London, had been lost in the River Plate.
