= Dowson (1807 ship) =

History

United Kingdom
- Builder: Thomas Steemson, Paull, Hull
- Launched: 5 January 1807
- Fate: Abandoned in the Atlantic Ocean on 19 October 1836

General characteristics
- Tons burthen: 340, or 352 (bm)
- Length: 104 ft 10 in (32.0 m)
- Beam: 28 ft 1 in (8.6 m)
- Armament: 4 × 6-pounder + 4 × 18-pounder guns

Dowson was launched in Hull in 1807 as a West Indiaman. She quickly became a transport and then made one voyage to New South Wales. Later she traded with North America. She underwent two maritime mishaps that she survived, one in 1807 and one in 1821. Her crew abandoned her in the Atlantic Ocean on 19 October 1836.

== Career ==
Dowson first appeared in Lloyd's Register (LR) in 1807.

Year	Master	Owner	Trade	Source
1807	Proudlove	S.Barworth & Co.	Hull–Jamaica	LR

On 18 February 1807 Dowson was in the Downs when a gale came up that wreaked havoc among the vessels there. Dowson lost her masts. On 30 March she was at Portsmouth on her way to Jamaica; she arrived at Jamaica on 19 June.

Year	Master	Owner	Trade	Source
1808	Proudlove	S.Barworth & Co.	Hull–Jamaica; London transport	LR
1813	Proudlove; Watson	S.Barworth & Co.	London transport	LR
1815	Watson; E.Gibson	S.Barkworth	Hull transport London–New South Wales	LR

In 1813 the British East India Company (EIC) had lost its monopoly on the trade between India and Britain. British ships were then free to sail east of the Cape to India, the Indian Ocean, or Australia under a licence from the EIC.

On 22 May 1815 Dowson, Gibbons, master, sailed from Deal, bound for the Cape and New South Wales. On 17 July Dowson put into Pernambuco to caulk her upper works. The stress of weather let to Gibbons cutting her cables and putting to sea. She sailed to Perahaba River to continue her repairs. As of 5 August she was still undergoing repairs there. She reached the Cape on 23 October and Van Dieman's Land on 24 February 1816.

Dowson, Gibbons, master, arrived at Sydney on 7 March with merchandise. She left on 30 June, bound for Batavia.

Year	Master	Owner	Trade	Source
1816	F.Gibbson; Cunningham	Gibbon & Co. Barkworth	London–New South Wales; London–Jamaica	LR
1818	A.Neil; W.Robinson	Barkworth	London–Jamaica; London–"Merimic"	LR
1819	Robinson	J.Boyes	Liverpool–New Brunswick	LR
1821	Robinson	J.Boyes	Liverpool–Mrmk	LR

On 7 November 1821, Dowson parted from her anchors and ran aground on the Hoyle Bank, in Liverpool Bay. She was on a voyage from Miramichi Bay to Liverpool. Dowson was refloated on 9 November and taken in to Liverpool.

Year	Master	Owner	Trade	Source & notes
1822	Robinson	J.Boyes	Liverpool–Miramichi	LR; thorough repair 1822
1825	Robinson	J.Boyes	Liverpool–New Brunswick	LR; thorough repair 1822

In March 1824 John Boyes moved her registration to Whitby.

Year	Master	Owner	Trade	Source & notes
1827	Robinson; W.Tickle	J.Boyes	Liverpool–Miramichi	LR; thorough repair 1822
1828	W.Tickle; H.Boys	J.Boyes	Cork	LR; thorough repair 1822
1829	H.Boyes	J.Boyes	Belfast–Quebec	LR; thorough repair 1822
1830	H.Boyes	J.Boyes	Liverpool–Quebec	LR; thorough repair 1822 & small repairs 1830
1831	H.Boyes	J.Boyes	Liverpool–Chaleur Bay	LR; thorough repair 1822 & small repairs 1830
1834	J.Lewis			

For some years in the 1830s Dowson's master was Gowland. When he traded with Chaleur Bay her backhaul cargo was lumber.

In 1834 Dowson's owners became Henry Boyes (40 shares), Elizabeth Boyes (8), Catherine Boyes (8), and Jane Boyes (8).

== Fate ==
Her crew abandoned Dowson, Coulson, master, (or Jn.Coupon), in the Atlantic Ocean on 19 October 1836 at 46°N 56°W. Lipton, of Richibucto, rescued the 17 crew members. Dowson was on a voyage from Whitby to Saint John, New Brunswick.
