= Sir John Sherbroke (1804 ship) =

History

Nova Scotia
- Name: Sir John Sherbrooke
- Namesake: John Coape Sherbrooke
- Launched: 1804, Nova Scotia
- Fate: Wrecked 1816

General characteristics
- Tons burthen: 141 (bm)
- Sail plan: Brig

Sir John Sherbrooke was built in 1804 in Nova Scotia. She first appeared in the British registers in 1815 and was wrecked in 1816.

Sir John Sherbrooke first appeared in Lloyd's Register (LR) in 1815. In 1816 she appeared with T.Garrett, master, changing to D. Cowan, N.Shanon, owner, and trade Liverpool–Newfoundland, changing to Liverpool–Jamaica.

Captain Cowan was sailing from Jamaica to New York when Sir John Sherbrooke struck a reef in the Dry Tortugas on 19 October 1816, and bilged. The crew was saved, and proceeded to make off with the $60,000 in specie that she was carrying. The passenger and their chests were put ashore. Then the captain, mate, some crew members, and two steerage passengers went back aboard and took out all the specie, which had been stored in barrel and boxes in the hold. Reportedly, Cowan offered the two steerage passengers $500 each if they went in the longboat with him to the United States.
