= Surrey (1804 EIC ship) =

History

United Kingdom
- Owner: EIC voyages 1-4: William Borradaile; EIC voyages 5-6: Richardson Borradaile
- Operator: East India Company
- Builder: Dudman, Deptford
- Launched: 3 November 1804
- Fate: Sold for breaking up in 1816

General characteristics
- Tons burthen: 819, or 868, or 86864/94 (bm)
- Length: Overall:143 ft 11 in (43.9 m); Keel:116 ft 2 1/2 in (35.4 m)
- Beam: 36 ft 5 in (11.1 m)
- Depth of hold: 14 ft 9 in (4.5 m)
- Complement: 1805:110; 1811:110
- Armament: 1805: 30 × 18-pounder guns + 6 swivel guns; 1811: 30 × 18-pounder guns

Surrey was launched in 1804 at Deptford as an East Indiaman. She made six voyages for the British East India Company (EIC). She was sold for breaking up in 1816.

== Career ==
1st EIC voyage (1805–1806): Captain John Altham Cumberledge acquired a letter of marque on 31 January 1805. He sailed from Portsmouth on 8 March, bound for Madras and Bengal. Surrey reached Madras on 17 July and arrived at Diamond Harbour on 9 August. Homeward bound, she was at Saugor on 31 December. She reached Point de Galle on 12 March 1806 and St Helena on 15 May, and arrived back at the Downs on 19 July.

2nd EIC voyage (1807–1808): Captain Cumberledge sailed from Portsmouth on 18 April 1807, bound for Madras and Bengal. Surrey reached Madras on 10 September and arrived at Diamond Harbour on 29 November. Homeward bound, she was at Saugor on 9 January 1808, Point de Galle on 7 March, and St Helena on 12 June; she arrived back at the Downs on 14 August.

3rd EIC voyage (1809–1810): Captain Cumberledge sailed from Portsmouth on 28 April 1809, bound for Madras and Bengal. Surrey reached Madeira on 8 May and Madras on 15 September, before arriving at Diamond Harbour on 23 October. Homeward bound, she was at Saugor on 6 December. She reached Vizagapatam on 31 December and Madras on 13 January 1810. She reached Point de Galle on 17 February and St Helena on 3 May, and arrived back at the Downs on 7 July.

4th EIC voyage (1811–1813): Captain Samuel Beadle acquired a letter of marque on 5 April 1811. He sailed from Torbay on 30 May 1811. Surrey reached Madeira on 20 June and arrived at Kedgeree on 18 November. To stop at Madras Surrey was at Saugor on 13 February 1812. She arrived at Madras on 13 June, and returned to Diamond Harbour on 5 August. Homeward bound, she was at Saugor on 12 October, reached St Helena on 14 February 1813, and arrived back at the Downs on 14 May.

5th EIC voyage (1814–1815): Captain Beadle sailed from Portsmouth on 10 May 1814, bound for Madras and Bengal. Surrey arrived at Madras on 15 September. Homeward bound, she was at Saugor on 12 October, Point de Galle on 14 January 1815, the Cape on 27 March, and St Helena on 24 April. She arrived back at the Downs on 23 June.

6th EIC voyage (1815−1816): Captain Beadle sailed from the Downs on 15 November 1815, bound for Madras and Batavia, Dutch East Indies. Surrey was at Madeira on 3 December and arrived at Madras on 8 April 1816. She reached Penang on 22 May and Malacca on 3 June, and arrived at Batavia on 26 June. She stopped at Indremayo on 10 July, before arriving back at Batavia on 14 August. Homeward bound, she reached St Helena on 19 October and arrived at the Downs on 15 December.

== Fate ==
In 1816 Surrey was sold for breaking up.
