= Antelope (1807 ship) =

History

France
- Builder: Nantes
- Launched: 1804, or 1805,
- Fate: Captured 1807

United Kingdom
- Name: Antelope
- Owner: LeHou & Co.
- Acquired: 1807 by purchase of a prize
- Fate: Broken up circa 1824

General characteristics
- Tons burthen: 267, or 26752/94, or 268 (bm)
- Complement: 1807: 50; 1810: 18
- Armament: 1807:12 × 6&9-pounder guns; 1807:2 × 9-pounder guns + 12 × 18-pounder carronades; 1810: 1 × 9-pounder gun + 8 × 18-pounder carronades; 1811: 2 × 9-pounder gun + 6 × 18-pounder carronades

Antelope was launched at Nantes in 1804 under another name. The British captured her and the High Court of Admiralty condemned her on 1 June 1807. She sailed to the Pacific, possibly as a whaler, where she captured a Spanish vessels. In 1811 she made one voyage to India for the British East India Company. She next traded with South America and the Mediterranean. A United States privateer captured her in 1814, but the Royal Navy quickly recaptured her. She was probably broken up circa 1824.

== Career ==
Antelope first appeared in Lloyd's Register in 1807 with Le Pelley, master, Lehou & Co., owner, and trade London–Madeira.

Captain John Le Pelley acquired a letter of marque on 28 August 1807. The size of Antelope's crew and the scale of her armament suggests that the intent was to employ her as a privateer. She sailed on a privateering cruise on 1 September 1807.

Antelope and Le Pelley received a pass on 23 November 1807, for departure from the Thames for Madeira and the southern whale fishery.

On 29 December 1807 Antelope, Le Pelley, master, sailed from Gravesend, bound for Port Jackson. In September 1808 she was reported to have been at Rio de Janeiro, having come from Falmouth.

A list of vessels that entered and left Port Jackson between 1800 and 1817 does not list Antelope.

Instead, Le Pelley apparently sailed to the Pacific via Cape Horn. On 12 October 1808 Antelope and the whaler Pandour, Thomas Anderson, master, captured the Spanish ship Nueva Castor, Ramón Goycochea, master. Nueva Castor had left Valparaiso the day before. Goycochea did not resist, and showed his British captors documents attesting to the signing of an armistice between Spain and Britain. Anderson and LePelley ignored the documents and proceeded to loot Nueva Castor of her cargo. They also threw overboard those of her guns they could not transfer to their vessels. The British then allowed Goycochea and Nueva Castor to sail on to Callao.

On 17 February 1809 Antelope, Le Pelley, master, was off Rio de Janeiro, having come around Cape Horn. She had sustained damage in several engagements with Spanish warships. She arrived at Guernsey in May from Rio de Janeiro. In a letter, Le Pelley reported that he had arrived Rio de Janeiro with not a mast nor yard fit to use and sails totally worn out.

On 29 March 1810 Antelope, Le Pelley, master, was off Dover, having come from Rio de Janeiro and the River Plate. She arrived in Guernsey from London in May, having made that transit in 38 hours.

Le Pelley acquired a second letter of marque on 4 September 1810 that gave her a crew of only 18 men, rather than the 50 of the prior letter.

Antelope received several protections: 3 September 1810 to Newfoundland, Straits & Brazil, 3 July 1811 to Madeira, 28 August 1811 to Newfoundland, and 5 September 1812 to Rio de Janeiro.

Lloyd's Register for 1811 still gave her master's name as J. La Pelley, and her owner as LeHou & Co. Her trade was now London–Guernsey. The Register of Shipping for 1812 gave her master as J. LePelly, her owner as Lirou & Co., and her trade as Plymouth–Newfoundland.

Antelope sailed from London to Bengal in 1811 with dispatches for the British East India Company (EIC). Sources report that she remained in India, but this appears to be incorrect.

On 24 October 1812, Le Pelley received another letter of marque. Her armament was as in the letter in 1810, but her crew numbered 30 men.

Between 1813 and 1820, Antelope traded with South America and the Mediterranean, under various masters. In 1814 her master was still listed as Le Pelley.

Le Pelley sailed from Guernsey to Gibraltar in 1813, and then on to Palermo. On 21 January 1814 he arrived at Rio de Janeiro from Sicily. On 3 April Antelope sailed from Rio to Havana. On 29 July Antelope, Journeux, master, arrived at Havana from Rio. On 7 August the United States privateer Chasseur captured Antelope as Antelope was sailing from Havana to Naples. Antelope was armed with eight 18-pounder carronades and one long gun, but gave up without any resistance. She was carrying 900 boxes of sugar.

On 26 August, HMS Whiting recaptured Antelope. (Note: A first-class share of the prize money was worth £296 12s; a sixth-class share, that of an ordinary system, was worth £18 1s 6d)

On 12 September Antelope arrived at Scilly after her recapture. Then on 7 October, Antelope, Journeaux, master, arrived at Guernsey from Havana.

From 1815 to 1817, Antelope's master was N.Le Messurier. From 1818 to 1819 her master was M.Bayfield. In 1820 her master was M.Collas. On 7 October 1822, Captain Michael Collas received a pass to sail to Havana on a trading voyage.

== Fate ==
Antelope was re-registered at Guernsey in 1822. She appears to have been broken up circa 1824.
