= Louis Crucy =

French architect

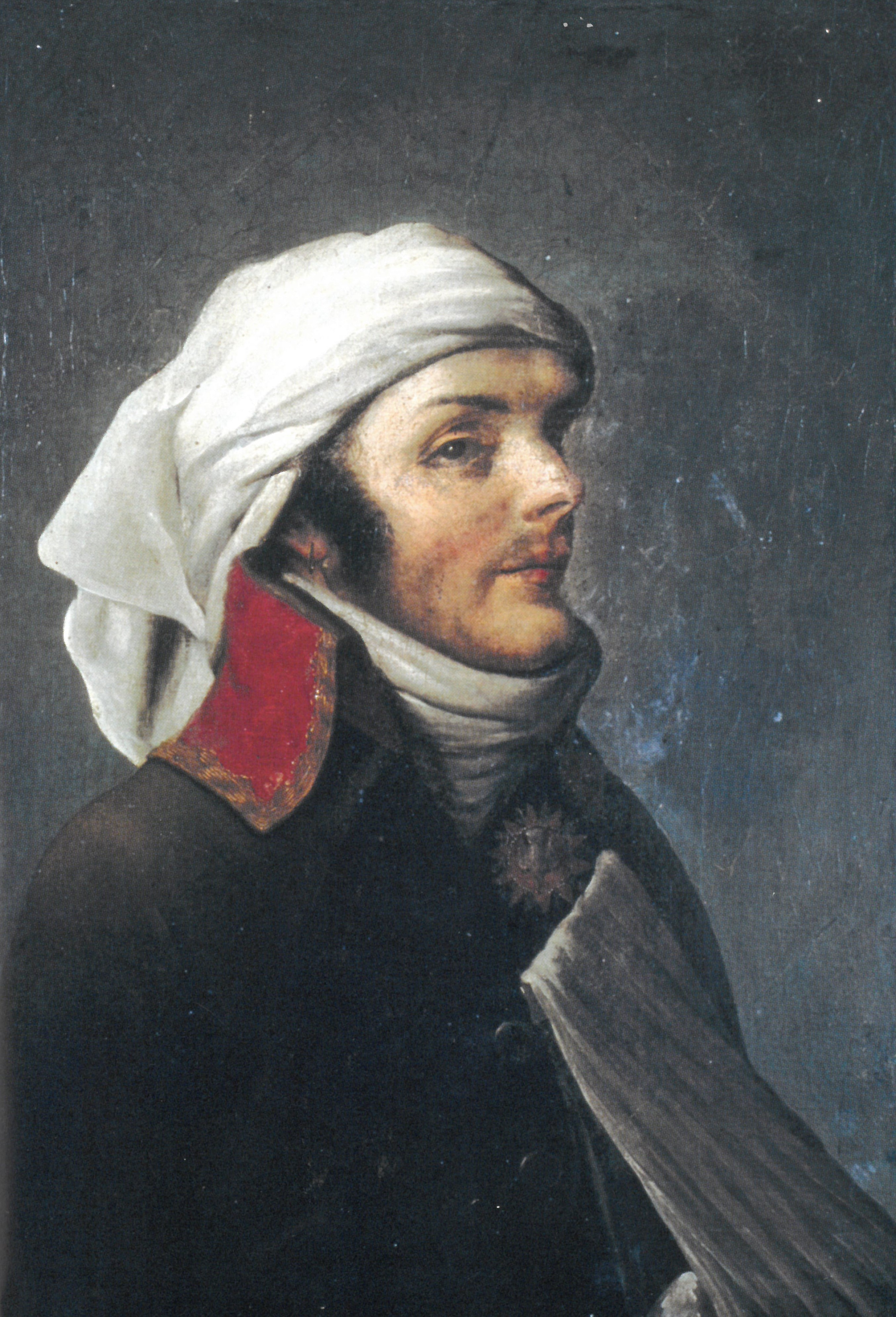
A painting of Crucy from 1796

Louis Crucy (4 July 1756 – 8 August 1837) was a French architect and brother of Mathurin Crucy, with whom he worked on the naval facilities at Indre, near Nantes, from 1800 onwards, as they expanded due to the war effort against England.

== Life ==
Crucy was born in Nantes. On the 4 October 1785, in the Saint Similien's church in Nantes, Louis and Mathurin Crucy married sisters Françoise and Marie Françoise Le Roux. Louis Crucy and Françoise Le Roux had two daughters, Justine (born in 1798) and Alexandrine-Zita (born in 1801), who themselves married two brothers, both architects, Louis-Prudent Douillard (in 1821) and Constant Douillard (in 1823). Constant Douillard (born in 1795) is considered a rather important architect in Nantes : he designed some of the hospitals of Loire-Inférieure, notably St. Jacques General Hospital in Nantes, and the place du Sanitat in the same town. Louis-Prudent (born in 1790) generally worked in association with his brother.

The Crucy shipyard was located at Basse-Indre in the commune of Indre. It was visited by Napoleon when he came in Nantes in 1808. After the failure, it was abandoned until 1821, when it was sold to a group of British investors who between 1822 and 1824, created there a steel facility, which was to be known as the Forges de Basse-Indre (still existing nowadays, as Arcelor Packaging).
