= Lord Melville (1804 ship) =

British government transport ship

History

United Kingdom
- Builder: Leith, Scotland
- Launched: 1804
- Fate: Last listed 1809

General characteristics
- Tons burthen: 201 (bm)
- Armament: 10 × 18-pounder carronades

Lord Melville was launched in Leith, Scotland in 1804. She served as a government transport, and was probably present at the Battle of Copenhagen (1807) as an armed transport. She was last listed in 1809.

== Career ==
Lord Melville first appeared in Lloyd's Register (LR) in 1804.

Year	Master	Owner	Trade	Source
1804	Js. Brown	Menzies & Co.	Leith transport	LR
1807	J.Brown; J.Beatson	Menzies & Co.	Leith transport	LR

Lord Melville may have been the transport of that name that in 1807 participated in the battle of Copenhagen. She was one of several transports that the commander-in-chief had ordered to be armed and that were carrying pennants, hence qualifying for prize money. (Note: An Able Seaman's share of the prize money was worth £3 8s.)

Year	Master	Owner	Trade	Source
1809	J.Beatson	Menzies & Co.	Leith government service	Register of Shipping

== Fate ==
Lord Melville was last listed in the registers in 1809.
