= Albury (1804 ship) =

History

United Kingdom
- Name: Albury
- Builder: North Shore, Newcastle
- Launched: 31 March 1804
- Fate: Wrecked 21 October 1837

General characteristics
- Tons burthen: 338, or 34156/94, or 342 (bm)
- Length: 96 ft 0 in (29.3 m)
- Beam: 24 ft 1 in (7.3 m)
- Depth: 17 ft 6 in (5.3 m)
- Sail plan: Snow
- Armament: 2 × 4-pounder guns + 8 × 18-pounder carronades (1814)â

Albury was launched in 1804 at Newcastle upon Tyne. She traded primarily with the Baltic, but elsewhere as well. In 1820 she carried settlers to South Africa. She was wrecked in October 1837 at Riga, Russia.

== Career ==
Albury first appeared in Lloyd's Register in 1805 with T.Boyle as master and owner, and trade London–Riga.

Year	Master	Owner	Trade	Source and notes
1810	T.Boyle	T.Boyle	London–Baltic; Malta	Lloyd's Register (LR)
1815	T.Boyle; Blair	Cumming	London–Malta; Liverpool–Jamaica	LR
1820	W.Wort	Cumming	Cork	LR

In 1820 Albury carried 167 settlers from England to South Africa under the auspices of the Government Settler Scheme. Captain Cunningham left Liverpool on 13 February 1820. Albury reached Simon's Bay on 1 May and arrived at Algoa Bay, Port Elizabeth, on 15 May. She brought with her some 142 passengers who had arrived at Simon's Bay on Zoroaster and then had had to transship aboard Albury to reach Algoa Bay.

Year	Master	Owner	Trade	Source and notes
1825	Cunnigham	D.Heatly	Liverpool–Petersburg	LR; repairs 1820
1830	Cunnigham	D.Heatley	Hull–Riga	LR; repairs 1820
1835	Dearness	Taylorson	Liverpool–Baltic	LR; thorough repair 1830

== Fate ==
Albury was driven ashore and wrecked on 21 October at the mouth of the Daugava while she was on a voyage from Riga to London. Her crew were rescued. (Note: The news item in the Times misnamed the vessel as Albany. Lloyd's List, by contrast, reported on 6 November 1837 that Albury, Cook, master, had gone on shore at Riga. The database of Tyne Built Ships also identifies the lost vessel as Albury.)
