= Mariner (1804 ship) =

History

United Kingdom
- Name: Mariner
- Builder: Whitehaven
- Launched: 1804
- Fate: Abandoned and foundered on 23 August 1823

General characteristics
- Tons burthen: 207 (bm)

Mariner was launched at Whitehaven in 1804. In 1814 an American privateer captured her but the British Royal Navy recaptured her. On 23 August 1823 her crew abandoned Mariner, which then foundered in the Atlantic.

== Career ==
Mariner first appeared in Lloyd's Register (LR) in 1804 with J.Askew, master and owner, and trade Dublin–Whitehaven.

Year	Master	Owner	Trade	Source
1805	J.Askew	J.Askew	Dublin–Whitehaven	LR
1810	D.Carr	D.Carr	Dublin–Whitehaven	LR
1812	D.Carr; Frazer	Capt. & Co.	Dublin–West Indies	LR
1814	T.Frazer	Carr & Co.	Belfast–Jamaica	LR

On 1 July 1813 the American privateer Yankee, of eighteen 12-pounder guns and one 18-pounder captured Mariner, Fraser. master, off Ireland. The day before Yankee had captured several other British merchantmen. Yankee paroled Mariner's master and crew, put them on a boat, and permitted them to land.

Mariner's cargo of rum and sugar was valued at $70,000. Although Yankee had sent her for France, she arrived at Providence, Rhode Island on 19 August.

On 29 August HMS Poictiers recaptured Mariner. On 26 October LL reported that Poictiers had captured Mariner, Frazer, master, from Jamaica to Belfast, and Watson, Gregg, master. from Maranham to Liverpool. Poictiers sent them both to Halifax. On 5 June 1814 Mariner "(retaken)" sailed for Belfast.

Year	Master	Owner	Trade	Source & notes
1816	Newby	Carr & Co.	Maryport–America	LR; damages repaired 1816
1820	Newby; Robinson; Brown; Richmond	Carr & Co.	Maryport; America	LR; good repair 1816

In February 1820 Mariner, Richmond, master, was driven ashore near Castletown, Isle of Man. She was on a voyage from Dublin to Maryport.

Year	Master	Owner	Trade	Source & notes
1823	H.Brown	Richmond	Liverpool–New Brunswick	LR; good repair 1816 & small repair 1823

== Fate ==
On 2 September, Dido, Bliss, master, arrived at Liverpool from Philadelphia. She brought the news that on 23 August she had spoken Mary, Ford, master, Liverpool to Quebec, and Mariner, of Maryport, Brown, master. On 15 August Mariner had sprung a leak and Mary had agreed to accompany her. (Note: Mary, of 282 tons (bm), Ford, master, had been launched at Philadelphia in 1806.) The next report was that her crew had abandoned Mariner in the Atlantic Ocean on 23 August while she was on a voyage from Ayr to Richibucto, New Brunswick. Mary, Ford, master, had taken the crew on board, and then transferred them to Hope, Porter, master, which had arrived at Belfast on 16 September. (Note: Hope, of 178 tons (bm), Porter, master, had been launched in 1814 at Chester. She was returning to Belfast from Mexico.) Mariner sank on the same day that her crew had abandoned her.
