= Zoroaster (1818 ship) =

History

United Kingdom
- Name: Zoroaster
- Namesake: Zoroaster
- Builder: Hull
- Launched: 1818
- Fate: Crew mutinied and scuttled her in 1836

General characteristics
- Tons burthen: 460 (bm)

Zoroaster was a ship launched at Hull in 1818. From the start she was an East Indiaman, sailing between England and India under a license from the British East India Company (EIC). Her crew mutinied and scuttled her in 1836.

== Career ==
Zoroaster first appeared in Lloyd's Register in 1818, with I.Ross, master, Egginton & Co., owner, and trade Hull–Calcutta.

In 1813, the East India Company had lost its monopoly on the trade between India and Britain. British ships were then free to sail to India or the Indian Ocean under a license from the EIC.

Zoroaster served as a transport vessel under the British government's 1820 Settlers scheme.

The settlers embarked on Zoroaster in December 1819, at Deptford. Unfortunately, ice on the Thames had trapped the ship which was only able to set sail on 12 February 1820. She arrived at Simon's Bay on 30 April. Her charter party only covered the journey to Simon's Bay (now Simon's Town) so when she arrived the some 142 settlers had to transship on Albury.

The Register of Shipping for 1821, still showed Zoroaster with A.Ross, master, Eggington, owner, and trade Hull–Calcutta, as it had for 1820. However, Zoroaster's master was Thompson. She was at Deal on 4 February 1820, having come from the Thames, bound for the Cape of Good Hope. On 16 March Zoroaster, of Hull, Thompson, master, was at 1°10′N 19°55′W. On 30 May, she sailed from the Cape for Mauritius. She arrived there on 20, June and sailed for Bengal on the 29th. She arrived at Bengal on 27 July. On 12 January 1821, she was back at Cape of Good Hope, having come from Bengal via Mauritius. On 1 April, she was off Dover and on the 4th she was at Gravesend.

Year	Master	Owner	Trade	Source & notes
1825	"VnKnichr"	Holland (location)	Hull–India	LR; rebuilt 1821
1830	"VnKnichr"	Holland (location)	Hull–India	LR; rebuilt 1821

Zoroaster disappears from Lloyd's Register and the Register of Shipping after 1830. She next appeared in Singapore. An advertisement gave her masters name as Patton. He managed Zoroaster with his wife. She sailed with him on her last two voyages. When her crew deserted at Sumatra in early 1836, on what would be her last voyage Mrs. Patton left Zoroaster, sailed to Penang on another vessel, and there recruited a new crew of lascars. When his crew deserted, Patton complained to the local rajah who investigated. The rajah found that the crew complained that Patton was cruel, beating them, and having beaten one lascar to death. Their wages were always six to seven months in arrears, and he withheld their provisions.

== Fate ==
Zoroaster's crew mutinied, murdered the captain, his wife, and the chief officer, and scuttled the vessel on or before 3 September 1836. By some reports Zoroaster was on a voyage from "Pilen" to China.

The mutiny took place off the coast of Sumatra near Aceh. The mutineers scuttled Zoroaster and landed at Kreung (or Kerong) Raja. They claimed that they had been shipwrecked but the local rajah soon found out about the mutiny. He did not, however, arrest them, or hand them over to the East India Company's schooner Zephyr when it came looking for them. One of the mutineers reported that Zoroaster had had special ports cut into her sides to facilitate the loading of lumber. These had facilitated her scuttling.
