= Henry Wellesley (1804 ship) =

History

United Kingdom
- Name: Henry Wellesley
- Namesake: Henry Wellesley, 1st Baron Cowley
- Builder: Bacon, Harvey & Co., Calcutta
- Launched: 1804
- Fate: Wrecked in 1841

General characteristics
- Tons burthen: 290, or 301, or 30140/94, or 304, or 320 (bm)
- Propulsion: Sail
- Sail plan: Later Barque
- Armament: 2 × 6-pounder guns
- Notes: Teak-built

Henry Wellesley was a barque built in 1804 by Bacon, Harvey & Company at Calcutta, British India. In 1808 a French privateer captured her, but she returned to British ownership. Between 1820 and 1824 she was a whaler that made three voyages to the British southern whale fishery. Later, she twice transported women convicts from England to Port Jackson, New South Wales. She was wrecked near Calais in 1841.

== Career ==
In September 1808 the French privateer Hirondelle captured Henry Wellesley, Wilkinson, master, near Ganjam. She returned to British ownership by means that are currently obscure.

Henry Wellesley entered Lloyd's Register (LR), in 1812.

Year	Master	Owner	Trade	Source
1814	S.Goube	Dumont	London–CGH	LR

In March 1812 Lloyd's List reported that Henry Wellesley had been on her way to Île de France when she had grounded between Gravesend, Kent and the Downs. She had lost her false keel and was expected to have to go into dock at Portsmouth and unload. By 3 June she was at Madeira, on her way to the CGH, the Cape, and Mauritius. On 21 August Henry Wellesley, Groube, master, had reached the Cape.

Henry Wellesley sailed from Bengal on 24 September 1813. She arrived at the Cape on 7 December and sailed from there on 13 December. On 4 January 1814 Henry Wellesley, Teeple, master, sailed from St Helena. On 14 March she was off Folkestone.

Henry Wellesley changed her registration to Great Britain on 20 May 1814.

Year	Master	Owner	Trade	Source
1814	S.Goube; A.Spain	Dumont; G.Faith	London–CGH; London–Martinique	LR

Henry Wellesley, Spain, master, sailed from Gravesend on 27 July, bound for Martinique.

Year	Master	Owner	Trade	Source
1818	A.Spain; C.Cole	G.Faith	London–Jamaica	LR
1820	C.W.Cole	G.Faith	London–India	LR

Cole sailed from Cork for Jamaica on 22 November 1819. On 31 May 1820 Henry Wellesley was at Deal, returning from Jamaica.

Cole did not sail to India. Instead, next Henry Wellesley became a whaler.

1st whaling voyage (1820–1821): Captain Brydon (or Bryon) sailed from London on 18 October 1820, bound for the south seas. Henry Wellesley hunted whales at the New South Shetland Islands (where she had arrived on 1 February 1821), and Delagoa Bay (where she had arrived on 1 June). She returned to England on 5 November 1821 with ten casks of whale oil, ten casks of blubber, and "fins".

2nd whaling voyage (1822–1823): Captain Luke, and the outward bound fleet, sailed from Deal on 24 February 1822. Henry Wellesley was at Falmouth on 14 March, and had to put back on 16 March. By 28 March she was at 41°11′N 12°30′W. Henry Wellesley again hunted whales at the South Shetland Islands and Delagoa Bay. On 29 August she was at St Helena, having come from the south seas. On 15 September she sailed again for the south seas. On 9 October she was at 33°41′S 2°00′E. She returned to England early in 1823 with 100 casks of whale oil, and "fins".

3rd whaling voyage (1823–1824): Captain Luke sailed from England for the South Seas on 14 March 1823. On 1 April 1823 Henry Wellesley was at the Cape, having come from Saldanha Bay and London. On 23 June she was off the Cape. Henry Wellesley was reported to have been at the Cape of Good Hope and St Helena in 1823. She returned to England on 9 February 1824.

Year	Master	Owner	Trade	Source & notes
1825	Tennant; Allen	Tennant	London–Jamaica; London–Sierra Leone	Register of Shipping; good repair 1818
1826	G.Wade	Tennant	London–Sierra Leone	LR
1828	G.Wade; Thompson	Tennant; J.Marshall	London–Sierra Leone	LR
1829	Church; Alexander	J.Marshall	London–New South Wales	LR; large repair 1828
1830	Alexander; Hicks	J.Marshall	London–Jamaica	LR; large repair 1828
1831	Hicks; Morton	J.Marshall	London–New South Wales	LR; large repair 1828
1832	Morton; Johnston	J.Marshall	London–Antigua	LR; large repair 1828
1833	Morton; Johnston	J.Marshall	London–New South Wales	LR; large repair 1828
1834	Johnston		London	LR
1835	Johnston	Curling & Co.	London	LR; large repair 1828 and damages repaired 1835
1836	Johnston	Curling & Co. Somes	London; London–Sydney	LR; large repair 1828 and damages repaired 1835

1st convict voyage (1835–1836): Under the command of Benjamin Freeman and surgeon Robert Wylie, Henry Wellesley departed Portsmouth, England on 7 October 1835, and arrived in Sydney on 7 February 1836. She had embarked 118 female convicts and had five convict deaths en route. Henry Wellesley departed Port Jackson on 20 March bound for Batavia in ballast.

2nd convict voyage (1837): Henry Wellesley sailed from Woolwich on 20 July 1837, under the command of Edward Williams and surgeon William Leyson; she arrived in Sydney on 22 December. She had initially embarked 140 female convicts, relanded one, and she arrived with 139; she had no convict deaths en route. Henry Wellesley departed Port Jackson on 10 February 1838 bound for Batavia via King George's Sound, with cargo.

Henry Wellesley sailed from Batavia on 2 January 1839 to Port Adelaide arriving on 5 March, then to Sydney arriving on 18 March. She then sailed for Batavia, before returning to Sydney in September and a voyage to Hobart Town, before again sailing for Batavia.

Year	Master	Owner	Trade	Source & notes
1840	Williams	J.Somes; G.Castle	London; London–Sydney	LR; large repair 1828 and damages repaired 1835
1841	Williams	G.Castle	London; London–Sydney	LR; large repair 1828 and damages repaired 1835

== Fate ==
While she was traveling from London to Hobart Town, Henry Wellesley went aground near Calais on 25 May 1841 and was wrecked.

The volume for 1841 of Lloyd's Register carried the annotation "Wrecked" by Henry Wellesley's name.
