= Dowson (1804 ship) =

British merchant ship (1804–1824)

History

United Kingdom
- Name: Dowson
- Builder: Aberdeen
- Launched: 1804
- Fate: Wrecked 9 May 1824

General characteristics
- Tons burthen: 370 (bm)
- Armament: 8 × 18-pounder guns

Dowson was launched in Aberdeen in 1804. She spent 10 years as a transport, presumably for the government. Between 1814 and 1819 she disappeared from the registers, though ship arrival and departure data suggests some activity from 1817 on. From 1819 on she traded to Africa, and elsewhere. She wrecked in the St Lawrence River in 1824.

== Career ==
Dowson first appeared in Lloyd's Register (LR) in 1804.

Year	Master	Owner	Trade	Source
1804	Davidson	Gibbons	London transport	LR
1814	Davidson	Gibbons	London transport	LR

Between 1814 and 1819 Dowson disappeared from the registers. She reappeared in 1819. LR showed her having undergone work on her topsides and bends in 1818, and having had a large repair in 1819. The Register of Shipping (RS) gave her name as Dowsons, and reported repairs in 1817.

Year	Master	Owner	Trade	Source & notes
1819	Dermer	R.Gibbon	London–Saint Thomas; London–Sierra Leone	RS: large and small repairs 1817
1819	C.Dormer	Gibbon	London–Sierra Leone	LR; large repair 1819
1820	T.Dormer; Jameson	Gibbon	Plymouth–Sierra Leone; London–C.G.H.	LR; thorough repair 1819

On 10 October 1820 Captain Jameson and Dowson arrived at South Africa with 21 private party settlers.

Year	Master	Owner	Trade	Source & notes
1824	Jameson	Gibbon	Leith–St Davids	LR; thorough repair 1819
1824	Jameson	R.Gibbon	London–Malta	RS; small repairs 1817

== Fate ==
Dowson was lost on 9 May 1824 in the Saint Lawrence River. British Queen rescued the crew.
