= List of clasps to the Naval General Service Medal (1847) =

The Naval General Service Medal (NGSM) was a campaign medal approved in 1847, for issue to officers and men of the Royal Navy.

The Admiralty retroactively awarded the Naval General Service Medal for various naval actions that occurred during the period 1793–1840, a period that included the French Revolutionary Wars, the Napoleonic Wars, and the Anglo–American War of 1812. When the Admiralty issued a medal, it bore one or more clasps on the ribbon, representing the specific battles or actions in which the recipient served. In all, the Admiralty authorised 231 clasps, though in ten cases all potential claimants had died prior to the authorisation of the medal, with the result that those clasps were never issued. The clasps covered a variety of actions, from boat service to single-ship actions, to larger naval engagements, including major fleet actions such as the Battle of Trafalgar.

In all, 20,933 medals were awarded, 15,577 with a single clasp.

Some discrepancies between the dates of the medals and actual actions are due to the Royal Navy's practice of dating, in which the day officially began at noon. Until 11 October 1805, when the Admiralty ordered that "the calendar or civil day is to be made use of, beginning at midnight", ships' logs were kept in nautical time and written up at midday, so that a day's entry consisted of the proceedings for the afternoon of the day before and morning of that day. So, for example, an action that took place on the morning of 10 April, would be logged as occurring on 9 April.

The following is a list of all 231 clasps for this medal.

== Clasps ==
=== French Revolutionary Wars (1793–1802) ===
Clasp	Date of action	Action	Clasps issued	Conflict
Nymphe 18 June 1793	1793, 19 June	Capture of the French frigate Cleopatre.	4	War of the First Coalition
Crescent 20 Octr. 1793	1793, 20 October	Capture of the French frigate Reunion.	12	War of the First Coalition
Zebra 17 March 1794	1794, 20 March	The storming and capture of the bastion of Fort Royal, Martinique.	2	War of the First Coalition
Carysfort 29 May 1794	1794, 28 May	The recapture of HMS Castor.	0	War of the First Coalition
1 June 1794	1794, 1 June	Action against a French fleet in the battle of the Glorious First of June.	540	War of the First Coalition
Romney 17 June 1794	1794, 17 June	Capture of the Sibylle.	2	War of the First Coalition
Blanche 4 Jany. 1795	1795, 5 January	Capture of the French frigate Pique.	5	War of the First Coalition
Lively, 13 March 1795	1795, 13 March	Capture of the French corvette Tourterelle north of Ushant.	3	War of the First Coalition
14 March 1795	1795, 14 March	Action against a French fleet in the Battle of Genoa.	95	War of the First Coalition
Astraea 10 April 1795	1795, 10 April	Capture of the French frigate Gloire.	2	War of the First Coalition
Thetis 17 May 1795	1795, 16 May	Action against four French ships; and the capture of the Raison and Prévoyante off Cape Henry, Virginia.	2	War of the First Coalition
Hussar 17 May 1795	1795, 16 May	Action against four French ships; and the capture of the Raison and Prévoyante off Cape Henry, Virginia.	1	War of the First Coalition
Mosquito 9 June 1795	1795, 24 May	Capture of the French privateer National Razor off Cuba.	0	War of the First Coalition
17 June 1795	1795, 17 June	"Cornwallis's Retreat", or the First Battle of Groix.	41	War of the First Coalition
23rd June 1795	1795, 23 June	Action against a French fleet at the Battle of Groix.	177	War of the First Coalition
Dido 24 June 1795	1795, 24 June	Action against the French frigates Minerve and Artémise, and the capture of Minerve	1	War of the First Coalition
Lowestoffe 24 June 1795	1795, 24 June	Action against the French frigates Minerve and Artémise, and the capture of Minerve	6	War of the First Coalition
Spider 25 Augt. 1795	1795, 25 August	Engagement with the French brigs Suffisante and Victorieuse and capture of one of them.	1	War of the First Coalition
Port Spergui	1796, 17 March	Destroying the batteries at Port Spergui, the corvette Etourdie, four brigs, two sloops, and a lugger.	4	War of the First Coalition
Indefatigable 20 Apl. 1796	1796, 21 April	Capture of the Virginie.	6	War of the First Coalition
Unicorn 8 June 1796	1796, 8 June	Action against three French frigates; Tribune, Tamise, and Légėre, and capture of the two former.	4	War of the First Coalition
Sta. Margaritta 8 June 1796	1796, 8 June	Action against three French frigates; Tribune, Tamise, and Légėre, and capture of the two former.	3	War of the First Coalition
Southampton 9 June 1796	1796, 9 June	Capture of the French corvette Utile.	4	War of the First Coalition
Dryad 13 June 1796	1796, 13 June	Capture of the French frigate Proserpine.	5	War of the First Coalition
Terpsichore 13 Octr. 1796	1796, 13 October	Capture of the Spanish frigate Mahonesa.	3	Anglo-Spanish War (1796–1808)
Lapwing 3 Decr. 1796	1796, 27 November	Capture of the French corvette Décius, and destruction of the French brig Vaillante	2	War of the First Coalition
Minerve 19 Decr. 1796	1796, 19 December	Capture of the Spanish frigate Santa Sabina.	4	War of the First Coalition
Blanche 19 Dec. 1796	1796, 19 December	Capture of the Spanish frigate Santa Sabina.	2	War of the First Coalition
Indefatigable 13 Jany. 1797	1797, 13 January	Destruction of the French ship Droits de l'Homme.	8	Expédition d'Irlande
Amazon 13 Jany. 1797	1797, 13 January	Destruction of the French ship Droits de l'Homme.	6	Expédition d'Irlande
St Vincent	1797, 14 February	Action against a Spanish fleet at the Battle of Cape St Vincent.	348	Anglo-Spanish War (1796–1808)
San Fiorenzo 8 March 1797	1797, 9 March	Capture of the Résistance and the corvette Constance.	8	Battle of Fishguard
Nymphe 8 March 1797	1797, 9 March	Capture of the Résistance and the corvette Constance.	4	Battle of Fishguard
Camperdown	1797, 11 October	Action against a Dutch fleet in the Battle of Camperdown.	298	War of the First Coalition
Phoebe 21 Decr. 1797	1797, 21 December	Capture of the Néréide.	5	War of the First Coalition
Mars 21 April 1798	1798, 21 April	Capture of the Hercule.	26	War of the First Coalition
Isle St. Marcou	1798, 7 May	Defence of a British garrison against a French attack at the Battle of the Îles Saint-Marcouf.	3	War of the First Coalition
Lion 15 July 1798	1798, 15 July	Action against four Spanish frigates, and the capture of the Santa Dorotea.	23	Anglo-Spanish War (1796–1808)
Nile	1798, 1 August	Action against a French fleet at the Battle of the Nile.	326	Mediterranean campaign of 1798
Espoir 7 Augt. 1798	1798, 6 August	Capture of the Genoese pirate Liguria.	1	Mediterranean campaign of 1798
12 October 1798	1798, 12 October	Action against a French squadron in the Battle of Tory Island, and the capture of the 74 Hoche, and two frigates.	74	Irish Rebellion of 1798
Fisgard 20 Octr. 1798	1798, 20 October	Capture of the Immortalité.	9	Battle of Tory Island
Sibylle 28 Feby. 1799	1799, 1 March	Capture of the Forte.	12	French Revolutionary Wars
Telegraph 18 March 1799	1799, 18 March	Capture of the French privateer Hirondelle.	0	War of the Second Coalition
Acre	1799, 20 May	The defence of Acre; and other services during the siege.	41	French Campaign in Egypt and Syria
Schiermonnikoog 12 Augt. 1799	1799, 11/13 August	Attack on Schiermonnikoog, and the recapture of the brig HMS Crash.	9	War of the Second Coalition
Arrow 13 Sept. 1799	1799, 13 September	Capture of the Dutch ship Draak and the brig Gier.	2	War of the Second Coalition
Wolverine 13 Sept. 1799	1799, 13 September	Capture of the Dutch ship Draak and the brig Gier.	0	War of the Second Coalition
Surprise with Hermione	1799, 25 October	The boarding and recapture of HMS Hermione.	7	War of the Second Coalition
Speedy 6 Novr. 1799	1799, 6 November	Action against ten Spanish gun-boats and two schooners, and the successful defence of a convoy.	3	War of the Second Coalition
Courier 22 Novr. 1799	1799, 23 November	Capture of the French privateer cutter Guerrier.	3	War of the Second Coalition
Viper 26 Decr. 1799	1799, 26 December	Capture of the French privateer-brig Furet.	1	War of the Second Coalition
Harpy 5 Feb. 1800	1800, 5 February	Capture of the French frigate Pallas.	3	War of the Second Coalition
Fairy 5 Feby. 1800	1800, 5 February	Capture of the French frigate Pallas.	3	War of the Second Coalition
Loire 5 Feby 1800	1800, 5 February	Capture of the French frigate Pallas.	1	War of the Second Coalition
Peterel 21 March 1800	1800, 21 March	Capture of the Ligurienne.	2	War of the Second Coalition
Penelope 30 March 1800	1800, 30 March	Capture of the French ship Guillaume Tell.	11	War of the Second Coalition
Vinciego 30 March 1800	1800, 30 March	Capture of the French ship Guillaume Tell.	2	War of the Second Coalition
Capture of the Désirée	1800, 8 July	The capture of the Désirée, and other vessels.	21	Raid on Dunkirk (1800)
Seine 20 Augt. 1800	1800, 20 August	Capture of the Vengeance.	7	War of the Second Coalition
Phoebe 19 Feby. 1801	1801, 19 February	Capture of the Africaine.	6	War of the Second Coalition
Egypt	1801, 8 March to 2 September	Battle of Abukir (1801), Battle of Alexandria (1801), & Siege of Alexandria (1801); see also: French campaign in Egypt and Syria	618	War of the Second Coalition
Copenhagen 1801	1801, 2 April	Action against a Danish-Norwegian fleet at the Battle of Copenhagen.	555	War of the Second Coalition
Speedy 6 May 1801	1801, 6 May	Capture of the Spanish xebec-frigate Gamo.	7	War of the Second Coalition
Gut of Gibraltar 12 July 1801	1801, 12 July	Action against French and Spanish squadrons in the Battle of Algeciras Bay, and the destruction of two Spanish ships, and capture of St. Antonio.	142	War of the Second Coalition
Sylph 28 Septr. 1801	1801, 28 September	Action against the Artémise.	2	War of the Second Coalition
Pasley 28 Octr. 1801	1801, 28 October	Capture of the Spanish polacca-privateer Virgine de Rosario.	4	War of the Third Coalition

=== Napoleonic Wars (1803–15) ===
Clasp	Date of action	Action	Clasps issued	Conflict
Scorpion 31 March 1804	1804, 31 March	Capture of Dutch vessels in Vlie Roads.	4	Napoleonic Wars
Beaver 31 March 1804	1804, 31 March	Capture of Dutch vessels in Vlie Roads.	0	Napoleonic Wars
Centurion 18 Sept. 1804	1804, 18 September	Action against the French ship Marengo, and frigates Atalante and Semillante in the Battle of Vizagapatam.	9	Napoleonic Wars
Arrow 3 Feby. 1805	1805, 4 February	Protecting a convoy of British merchant ships when attacked by the French frigates Hortense and Incorruptible.	8	Napoleonic Wars
Acheron 3 Feby. 1805	1805, 4 February	Protecting a convoy of British merchant ships when attacked by the French frigates Hortense and Incorruptible.	1	Napoleonic Wars
San Fiorenzo 14 Feby. 1805	1805, 13 February	Capture of the Psyché.	12	Napoleonic Wars
Phoenix 10 Augt. 1805	1805, 10 August	Capture of the French frigate Didon.	25	Napoleonic Wars
Trafalgar	1805, 21 October	Defeat of a Franco-Spanish fleet at the Battle of Trafalgar.	1710	Trafalgar Campaign
4 Novr. 1805	1805, 4 November	Capture of four French ships-of-the-line in the Battle of Cape Ortegal.	296	Trafalgar Campaign
St. Domingo	1806, 6 February	Action against a French squadron in the Battle of San Domingo.	396	Napoleonic Wars
Amazon 13 March 1806	1806, 13 March	Capture of the French ships Marengo and Belle Poule.	29	Linois's expedition to the Indian Ocean
London 13 March 1806	1806, 13 March	Capture of the French ships Marengo and Belle Poule.	27	Linois's expedition to the Indian Ocean
Pique 26 March 1806	1806, 26 March	Capture of the French brigs Phaeton and Voltigeur.	8	West Indies Campaign 1804–1810
Sirius 17 April 1806	1806, 17 April	Action against a French flotilla off Civitavecchia, and the capture of the French ship Bergère.	10	Napoleonic Wars
Blanche 19 July 1806	1806, 19 July	Capture of the French frigate Guerrière.	22	Napoleonic Wars
Arethusa 23 Augt. 1806	1806, 23 August	Capture of the Spanish frigate Pomone.	6	Napoleonic Wars
Anson 23 Augt. 1806	1806, 23 August	Capture of the Spanish frigate Pomone.	6	Napoleonic Wars
Curacoa 1 Jany. 1807	1807, 1 January	Capture of Curaçao.	65	Napoleonic Wars
Pickle 3 Jany. 1807	1807, 3 January	Capture of the French privateer-cutter Favorite.	2	Napoleonic Wars
Hydra 6 Augt. 1807	1807, 7 August	Attack on batteries at Begur, and the capture of the vessels Eugene and Caroline.	11	Peninsular War
Comus 15 Augt. 1807	1807, 15 August	Capture of the Danish frigate Frederiksværn.	10	English Wars
Louisa 28 Octr. 1807	1807, 29 October	Action against the French privateer Marsouin.	1	Napoleonic Wars
Carrier 4 Novr. 1807	1807, 14 November	Capture of the French privateer-cutter Actif.	1	Napoleonic Wars
Ann 24 Novr. 1807	1807, 24 November	Capture of the Spanish privateer-lugger Vensejo, and the action against ten gunboats, and the surrender of two.	0	Napoleonic Wars
Sappho 2 March 1808	1808, 2 March	Capture of Danish brig Admiral Yawl.	4	Napoleonic Wars
San Fiorenzo 8 March 1808	1808, 8 March	Capture of the Piémontaise.	16	Napoleonic Wars
Emerald 13 March 1808	1808, 13 March	The destruction of batteries and vessels of war at Viveiro.	10	Napoleonic Wars
Childers 14 March 1808	1808, 14 March	Action against the Danish brig Lougen.	4	Napoleonic Wars
Nassau 22 March 1808	1808, 22 March	Destruction of the Danish ship-of-the-line Prins Christian Frederik in the Battle of Zealand Point.	31	Gunboat War
Stately 22 March 1808	1808, 22 March	Destruction of the Danish ship-of-the-line Prins Christian Frederik in the Battle of Zealand Point.	31	Gunboat War
Off Rota 4 April 1808	1808, 4 April	Action against Spanish gun-boats and convoy, and the destruction of several vessels.	19	Anglo-Spanish War (1796–1808)
Grasshopper 24 April 1808	1808, 24 April	Action and destruction of Spanish armed vessels and gun-boats at Faro.	7	Anglo-Spanish War (1796–1808)
Rapid 24 April 1808	1808, 24 April	Action and destruction of Spanish armed vessels and gun-boats at Faro.	1	Anglo-Spanish War (1796–1808)
Redwing 7 May 1808	1808, 7 May	Action against a Spanish convoy of seven gun-boats and armed vessels, and 12 merchant ships.	7	Anglo-Spanish War (1796–1808)
Virginie 19 May 1808	1808, 19 May	Capture of the Dutch frigate Guelderland off Cape Finisterre.	21	Gunboat War
Redwing 31 May 1808	1808, 1 June	A battery and a mistico destroyed, and two feluccas taken at Tarifa.	5	Anglo-Spanish War (1796–1808)
Seahorse Wh. Badere Zaffere	1808, 5/6 July	Capture of the Turkish frigate Badere Zaffere.	32	Napoleonic Wars
Comet 11 Augt. 1808	1808, 11 August	Action against three French brigs, and the capture of one, Sylph, off Ushant.	3	Napoleonic Wars
Centaur 26 Augt. 1808	1808, 26 August	Action against a Russian fleet, and the capture of the 74-gun ship Vsevolod.	41	Anglo-Russian War (1807-1812)
Implacable 26 Augt. 1808	1808, 26 August	Action against a Russian fleet, and the capture of the 74-gun ship Vsevolod.	41	Anglo-Russian War (1807-1812)
Cruizer 1 Novr. 1808	1808, 1 November	Action against a Danish flotilla off Gothenburg, and capture of a brig of war.	4	Gunboat War
Amethyst Wh. Thétis.	1808, 10 November	Capture of the French frigate Thétis.	31	Napoleonic Wars
Off the Pearl Rock 13 Decr. 1808	1808, 12/13 December	Action against batteries, and capture of a corvette off the Pearl Rock, Guadeloupe.	14	Napoleonic Wars
Onyx 1 Jany. 1809	1809, 1 January	Capture of Dutch corvette Manly in the North Sea.	5	Napoleonic Wars
Confiance 14 Jany. 1809	1809, 14 January	Capture of Cayenne.	8	West Indies Campaign 1804–1810
Martinique	1809, 24 February	Capture of Martinique.	486	West Indies Campaign 1804–1810
Horatio 10 Feby. 1809	1809, 10 February	Capture of the French frigate Junon.	13	Napoleonic Wars
Superieure 10 Feby. 1809	1809, 10 February	Capture of the French frigate Junon.	1	Napoleonic Wars
Amethyst 5 April 1809	1809, 5 April	Capture of the French frigate Niémen.	26	Napoleonic Wars
Basque Roads 1809	1809, 11/12 April	Destruction of French ships in the Battle of the Basque Roads.	529	Napoleonic Wars
Recruit 17 June 1809	1809, 17 April	Capture of the D'Hautpoul.	5	Troude's expedition to the Caribbean
Pompee 17 June 1809	1809, 17 April	Capture of the D'Hautpoul.	21	Troude's expedition to the Caribbean
Castor 17 June 1809	1809, 17 April	Capture of the D'Hautpoul.	5	Troude's expedition to the Caribbean
Cyane 25 and 27 June 1809	1809, 26/27 June 1809	Action against the French frigate Cérès, and the capture of eighteen gun-boats, and the destruction of four.	5	Napoleonic Wars
L'Espoir 25–27 June 1809	1809, 26/27 June 1809	Action against the French frigate Cérès, and the capture of eighteen gun-boats, and the destruction of four.	5	Napoleonic Wars
Bonne Citoyenne Wh. Furieuse	1809, 6 July	Capture of the French frigate Furieuse.	12	Napoleonic Wars
Diana 11 Sept. 1809	1809, 11 September	Capture of the Dutch brig Zephyr off Sulawesi.	5	Napoleonic Wars
Anse la Barque 18 Decr. 1809	1809, 18 December	The storming of the batteries at Anse à la Barque, Guadeloupe, and the capture of the French frigates Loire and Seine.	40	Roquebert's expedition to the Caribbean
Cherokee 10 Jany. 1810	1810, 11 January	Capture of the French privateer-lugger Aimable Nelly off Dieppe.	4	Napoleonic Wars
Scorpion 12 Jany. 1810	1810, 12 January	Capture of the Oreste.	5	Napoleonic Wars
Guadaloupe	1810, 4 February	Capture of Guadaloupe	483	Napoleonic Wars
Thistle 10 Feby. 1810	1810, 10 February	Capture of the Dutch corvette Havik.	0	Napoleonic Wars
Surly 24 April 1810	1810, 20 April	Cutting out of the French privateer cutter Alcide from the Pirou River, Normandy.	1	Napoleonic Wars
Firm 24 April 1810	1810, 20 April	Cutting out of the French privateer cutter Alcide from the Pirou River, Normandy.	1	Napoleonic Wars
Sylvia 26 April 1810	1810, 26 April	Capture of the Dutch brig Echo in the Sunda Strait.	1	Napoleonic Wars
Spartan 3 May 1810	1810, 3 May	Action against the French frigate Cérès and consorts; and the capture of the brig Sparvière, in the bay of Naples.	30	Napoleonic Wars
Royalist May and June 1810	1810, 23 February	Capture of six armed vessels.	3	Napoleonic Wars
Amanthea 25 July 1810	1810, 25 July	Action against gun-boats; and the capture and destruction of a number of transports at Amantea, Southern Italy.	23	Napoleonic Wars
Banda Neira	1810, 9 August	Capture of the Banda Islands.	68	Napoleonic Wars
Staunch 18 Sept. 1810	1810, 18 September	Action against a French squadron and the capture of the Vénus and the re-capture of HMS Ceylon.	2	Mauritius campaign of 1809–1811
Otter 18 Sept. 1810	1810, 18 September	Action against a French squadron and the capture of the Vénus and the re-capture of HMS Ceylon.	8	Mauritius campaign of 1809–1811
Boadicea 18 Sept. 1810	1810, 18 September	Action against a French squadron and the capture of the Vénus and the re-capture of HMS Ceylon.	15	Mauritius campaign of 1809–1811
Briseis 14 Octr. 1810	1810, 14 October	Capture of the French privateer Sans-Souci in the North Sea.	2	Napoleonic Wars
Lissa	1811, 13 March	Action against French and Venetian vessels in the Battle of Lissa.	124	Adriatic campaign of 1807-1814
Anholt 27 March 1811	1811, 27 March	Defence against a Danish attack by a British garrison at Anholt Island.	40	Gunboat War
Arrow 6 April 1811	1811, 6 April	Action against chasse-marées and batteries.	0	Napoleonic Wars
Off Tamatave 20 May 1811	1811, 20 May	Action against French frigates, and the capture of Renommée and Néréide.	79	Mauritius campaign of 1809–1811
Hawke 18 Augt. 1811	1811, 18 August	Capture of the 16-gun brig Heron and a convoy off Îles Saint-Marcouf.	6	Napoleonic Wars
Java	1811, July/18 September	Capture of Java.	665	Napoleonic Wars
Skylark 11 Novr. 1811	1811, 10 November	Action against the Boulogne flotilla, and the capture of a gun-brig.	4	Napoleonic Wars
Locust 11 Novr. 1811	1811, 10 November	Action against the Boulogne flotilla, and the capture of a gun-brig.	2	Napoleonic Wars
Pelagosa 29 Novr. 1811	1811, 29 November	Capture of two French frigates.	64	Napoleonic Wars
Victorious Wh. Rivoli	1812, 22 February	Capture of the French ship Rivoli	67	Adriatic campaign of 1807–1814
Weasel 22 Feby. 1812	1812, 22 February	Capture of the French ship Rivoli	6	Adriatic campaign of 1807–1814
Rosario 27 March 1812	1812, 27 April	Capture of two brigs of war.	7	Napoleonic Wars
Griffon 27 March 1812	1812, 27 April	Capture of two brigs of war.	3	Napoleonic Wars
Northumberland 22 May 1812	1812, 22 May	Destruction of two French frigates and a brig off Groix.	63	Napoleonic Wars
Growler 22 May 1812	1812, 22 May	Destruction of two French frigates and a brig off Groix.	1	Napoleonic Wars
Malaga 29 May 1812	1812, 22 April	Capture of the French privateers Brave and Napoleon at Malaga.	17	Napoleonic Wars
Off Mardoe 6 July 1812	1812, 6 July	Destruction of two Danish frigates and two brigs at the Battle of Lyngør.	47	Gunboat War
Sealark 21 July 1812	1812, 21 July	Capture of the French privateer-lugger Ville de Caen in the English Channel.	4	Napoleonic Wars
Royalist 29 Decr. 1812	1812, 29 December	Capture of the French privateer La Ruse.	3	Napoleonic Wars
Weasel 22 April 1813	1813, 22 April	Destruction of six gun-boats.	5	Napoleonic Wars
St. Sebastian	1813, 8 September	Siege of San Sebastián.	293	Peninsular War
Thunder 9 Octr. 1813	1813, 9 October	Capture of the French privateer-lugger Neptune in the English Channel.	7	Napoleonic Wars
Glückstadt 5 Jany. 1814	1814, 5 January	Capture of the fortress of Glückstadt.	42	War of the Sixth Coalition
Venerable 16 Jany. 1814	1814, 16/20 January	Capture of the French frigates Alcmène and Iphigénie off the Canary Isles.	42	Napoleonic Wars
Cyane 16 Jany. 1814	1814, 16/20 January	Capture of the French frigates Alcmène and Iphigénie off the Canary Isles.	7	Napoleonic Wars
Eurotas 25 Feby. 1814	1814, 25 February	Capture of the Clorinde.	32	Napoleonic Wars
Hebrus Wh. L'Etoile	1814, 27 March	Capture of the Étoile.	40	Napoleonic Wars
Gaieta 24 July 1815	1815, 8 August	Attack and reduction of Gaeta, Italy.	88	Neapolitan War

=== War of 1812 (1812–15) ===
Clasp	Date of action	Action	Clasps issued
Shannon Wh. Chesapeake	1813, 1 June	Capture of the American frigate Chesapeake off Boston.	42
Pelican 14 Augt. 1813	1813, 14 August	Capture of the American brig Argus in the Irish Sea.	4
Phoebe 28 March 1814	1814, 18 March	Capture of American frigate Essex and the sloop Essex Junior off Valparaíso.	31
Cherub 28 March 1814	1814, 28 March	Capture of American frigate Essex and the sloop Essex Junior off Valparaíso.	7
The Potomac 17 Augt. 1814	1814, 29 August	Capture of Alexandria, Virginia, and destruction of shipping on the Potomac River.	108
Endymion Wh. President	1815, 15 January	Capture of USS President off New York Harbor.	58

=== Later wars (1816, 1827, & 1840) ===
Clasp	Date of action	Action	Clasps issued	Conflict
Algiers	1816, 27 August	Anglo-Dutch bombardment of Algiers.	1328	Barbary Slave Trade
Navarino	1827, 20 October	Joint British, French, and Russian action against a Turkish fleet at the Battle of Navarino.	1142	Greek War of Independence
Syria	1840, 4 November	Capture of Acre by Austrian, British and Turkish forces, and operations connected with it on the coast of Syria.	6978	Syrian War

== Boat service clasps ==
The boat service clasps commemorate a number of actions performed by boats' crews in cutting out, and in some instances actually recovering, British vessels lost to the enemy, or capturing enemy vessels. These clasps were approved for those occasions where an officer or senior rating received promotion as a direct consequence.

=== French Revolutionary Wars (1793–1802) ===
Clasp	Date of action	Clasps issued	Awarded to	Action
15 Mar. Boat Service 1793	1793, 15 March	1	Syren	Attack on fortifications at Willemstadt.
17 Mar. Boat Service 1794	1794, 17 March	29	Asia • Assurance • Aurora • Avenger • Beaulieu • Blonde • Boyne • Dromedary • Experiment • Irresistible • Nautilus • Quebec • Rattlesnake • Roebuck • Rose • Santa Margarita • Seaflower • Spiteful • Tormentor • Ulysses • Vengeance • Venom • Vesuvius • Veteran • Winchelsea • Woolwich • Zebra	Boarding and capturing the French frigate Bienvenue, and other vessels in Fort Royal Bay.
29 May Boat Service 1797	1797, 29 May	3	Lively • Minerve	Cutting out of Mutine.
9 June Boat Service 1799	1799, 9 June	4	Success	Capture of a Spanish polacre.
20 Dec. Boat Service 1799	1799, 21 December	3	Queen Charlotte	Recapture of the cutter Lady Nelson, which had been taken by two privateers.
29 July Boat Service 1800	1800, 29 July	4	Amethyst • Impetueux • Viper	Capture of the gun-brig Cerbère from the harbour at Port-Louis, Morbihan.
29 Aug. Boat Service 1800	1800, 29 August	26	Amelia • Amethyst • Brilliant • Courageux • Cynthia • Impetueux • London • Renown • Stag	Cutting out of the French privateer Guêpe in Vigo Bay.
27 Oct. Boat Service 1800	1800, 27 October	5	Phaeton	Cutting out of the Spanish polacre San Josef at Fuengirola.
21 July Boat Service 1801	1801, 21 July	9	Beaulieu • Doris • Uranie • Ville de Paris	Cutting out of the French naval corvette Chevrette in Camaret Bay.

=== Napoleonic Wars (1803–15) ===
Clasp	Date of action	Clasps issued	Awarded to	Action
27 June Boat Service 1803	1803, 27 June	5	Loire	Cutting out of the French brig Venteux.
4 Nov. Boat Service 1803	1803, 4 November	1	Blanche	Cutting out of a French schooner at Santo Domingo.
4 Feb. Boat Service 1804	1804, 4 February	10	Centaur	Cutting out of Curieux at Fort Royal.
4 June Boat Service 1805	1805, 4 June	10	Loire	Capture of the French privateer Confiance in Muros Bay, Spain.
16 July Boat Service 1806	1806, 16 July	51	Achille • Centaur • Indefatigable • Iris • Monarch • Polyphemus • Prince of Wales • Revenge	Cutting out of the French 16-gun brig-corvette César from the Gironde estuary.
2 Jan. Boat Service 1807	1807, 2 January	2	Cerberus	Capture of a French schooner and sloop at Martinique.
21 Jan. Boat Service 1807	1807, 21 January	9	Galatea	Capture of Lynx off the coast of Venezuela.
19 Apl. Boat Service 1807	1807, 19 April	1	Richmond	Capture of the Spanish privateer lugger Galliard north of Peniche.
13 Feb. Boat Service 1808	1808, 13 February	3	Confiance	Capture of a French gun-boat off the Tagus.
10 July Boat Service 1808	1808, 10 July	8	Porcupine	Capture of a large 6-gun polacre at Port d'Anzo.
11 Aug. Boat Service 1808	1808, 11 August	12	Edgar	Capture of Danish 16-gun brig-sloop Fama and 12-gun cutter Salorman at Nyborg, Denmark.
28 Nov. Boat Service 1808	1808, 28 November	2	Heureux	Attack on shore batteries, and the capture of schooner and a brig at Baie-Mahault, Guadeloupe.
7 July Boat Service 1809	1809, 7 July	33	Bellerophon • Implacable • Melpomene • Prometheus	Capture and destruction of 7 Russian gun-boats and 12 storeships at Hango Head, Baltic Sea.
14 July Boat Service 1809	1809, 14 July	8	Scout	Storming of a battery at Carry-le-Rouet, west of Marseille.
25 July Boat Service 1809	1809, 25 July	35	Fawn	Action with a cutter and the capture of the schooner Guadaloupe.
25 July Boat Service 1809	1809, 25 July	35	Cerberus • Minotaur • Princess Carolina • Prometheus	Attack on four Russian gunboats and a brig off Aspö Head, near Fredrikshamn, Finland.
27 July Boat Service 1809	1809, 27 July	10	Briseis • Ephira • Aimable • Musquito • Pincher	Taking and destroying a battery at Cuxhaven.
29 July Boat Service 1809	1809, 29 July	11	Acorn • Bustard • Excellent	Capture of six Italian gun-boats and ten trabaccolos at Duino, Trieste.
28 Aug. Boat Service 1809	1809, 28 August	14	Amphion	Destruction of a shore battery and five trabaccolos, and the capture of two large and four smaller gun-boats and two trabaccolos at Cortelazzo, west of Venice.
1 Nov. Boat Service 1809	1809, 1 November	117	Apollo • Cumberland • Philomel • Scout • Tigre • Topaze • Tuscan • Volontaire	Attack on a French convoy in the Bay of Rosas and capture of eleven vessels.
13 Dec. Boat Service 1809	1809, 13 December	10	Achates • Attentive • Bacchus • Pultusk • Thetis	Cutting out of the French 16-gun brig Nisus at Deshaies, Guadaloupe.
13 Feb. Boat Service 1810	1810, 13 February	17	Armide • Christian VII • Seine	Attack on French gun-boats, with several destroyed and one captured, at the Basque Roads.
1 May Boat Service 1810	1810, 1 May	18	Nereide	Storming of two batteries and capture of the French schooner Estafette at Jacolet, Mauritius.
28 June Boat Service 1810	1810, 28 June	24	Amphion • Active • Cerberus	Attack on convoy of twenty-five vessels at Grao, five ships captured, the rest destroyed.
27 Sept. Boat Service 1810	1810, 27 September	34	Armide • Caledonia • Valiant	Destruction of a battery and a brig, and the capture of two brigs at Pointe de Che, Basque Roads.
4 Nov. Boat Service 1810	1810, 4 November	2	Blossom	Capture of the French lateen xebec privateer Caesar off Cape Sicié, west of Toulon.
23 Nov. Boat Service 1810	1810, 23 November	66	Devastation • Thunder • Aetna • with a number of mortar vessels, and boats of the Cadiz Fleet	Attack and destruction of French shipping at Port St. Mary, Bay of Cádiz.
24 Dec. Boat Service 1810	1810, 24 December	6	Diana	Destruction of the French 40-gun frigate L'Elize at La Hogue.
4 May Boat Service 1811	1811, 4 May	10	Alceste • Belle Poule	Destruction of French 14-gun brig at Parenza.
30 July Boat Service 1811	1811, 30 July	4	Minden	Storming of Fort Marrack, west of Batavia, Java.
2 Aug. Boat Service 1811	1811, 2 August	10	Alert • Exertion • Princess Augusta • Quebec • Raven • Redbreast	Capture of four Danish gun-brigs in the River Jahde.
20 Sept. Boat Service 1811	1811, 20 September	8	Victory	Capture of Danish gun-boats.
4 Dec. Boat Service 1811	1811, 4 December	18	Sultan	Capture of a French settee, and the brig Le Languedocienne off Bastia.
4 Apl. Boat Service 1812	1812, 4 April	4	Maidstone	Capture of the French privateer xebec Martinet in the Mediterranean.
1 Sept. Boat Service 1812	1812, 1 September	24	Bacchante • Weazel	Capture of two merchant vessels off Rovigno, and a number of others, including the French xebec Tisiphone, and two gun-boats.
17 Sept. Boat Service 1812	1812, 17 September	11	Eagle	Capture of 17 gun-boats, and destruction of six, at Cape Maestro, Ancona.
29 Sept. Boat Service 1812	1812, 29 September	26	Aboukir • Ranger • and gun-boats	Attack on Mittau, Riga, and capture of officers and men of the enemy.
6 Jany. Boat Service 1813	1813, 6 January	21	Bacchante	Capture of five gun-brigs off Otranto.
21 Mar. Boat Service 1813	1813, 21 March	6	Blazer • Brev Drageren	Capture of the Danish gun-boats Jonge-Troutman and Liebe off Brunsbüttel.
2 May Boat Service 1813	1813, 2 May	49	Redwing • Repulse • Undaunted • Volontaire	Battery destroyed, and six vessels captured at Morgion.
24 May Boat Service 1814	1814, 24 May	11	Elizabeth	Capture of the L'Aigle off Corfu.

=== War of 1812 (1812–15) ===
Clasp	Date of action	Clasps issued	Awarded to	Action
28 Apl. Boat Service 1813	1813, 28 April	2	Orpheus	Destruction of the American "letter of marque" Wampoe off Block Island.
Apl. & May Boat Service 1813	1813, April & May	57	Dolphin • Dragon • Fantome • Highflyer • Maidstone • Marlborough • Mohawk • Racer • Statira	Attacks on Frenchtown and Havre de Grace, Maryland, and destruction of the fort and cannon foundry.
8 Apl. Boat Service 1814	1814, 8 April	24	Boxer • Endymion • Hogue • Maidstone	Destruction of twenty-seven American vessels, including three privateers, at Pettipague Point, about 15 miles up Connecticut River.
3 & 6 Sept. Boat Service 1814	1814, 3 & 6 September	1		Capture of the USS Tigress and USS Scorpion in the Nottawasaga River, Lake Huron.
14 Dec. Boat Service 1814	1814, 14 December	205	Alceste • Armide • Bedford • Belle Poule • Cydnus • Diomede • Gorgon • Meteor • Norge • Ramillies • Royal Oak • Seahorse • Sophie • Tonnant • Trave	Capture of five U.S. gun-boats and a sloop in the Battle of Lake Borgne.
