= HMS Bacchus (1808) =

Pultusk
History

Batavian Republic
- Name: Bacchus
- Namesake: Bacchus
- Launched: c.1806
- Captured: 1807

United Kingdom
- Name: HMS Bacchus
- Acquired: 1807 by capture
- Honours and awards: Naval General Service Medal (NGSM), with clasps: "Martinique"; "13 Dec. Boat Service 1809"; "Guadaloupe"
- Fate: Broken up 1812

General characteristics
- Tons burthen: 141 (bm)
- Sail plan: Schooner
- Armament: 12 guns

HMS Bacchus was a Dutch 10-gun schooner launched c.1806 that the British Royal Navy captured in 1807 and took into service in 1808 under her existing name. She served in several campaigns that earned her crews clasps to the Naval General Service Medal. She was broken up in 1812.

== Career 1812 ==
The Royal Navy commissioned Bachus in 1808 under Lieutenant Samuel Malbon. In early August Bacchus sailed with a flag of truce to the Oronoque carrying a three-man delegation.

In 1809 Lieutenant Charles Deyman Jermy (or Jeremy) replaced Malbon. In February Jermy and Bacchus were at the invasion of Martinique. Four decades later the operation was among the actions recognised by the clasp "Martinique" attached to the Naval General Service Medal (NGSM), awarded upon application to all British participants still living in 1847.

A British squadron under Captain George Miller in Thetis arrived at Deshaies on 12 December to reconnoiter the harbour. There they found the French navy's brig Nisus about to leave, having loaded a cargo of coffee. Miller sent in boats with the marines from Thetis, Pultusk, Achates, and Bacchus, and 78 sailors. The landing party first captured the fort at Deshaies, whereupon Nisus surrendered when the landing party turned the fort's guns on herguns were turned on her. During the operation, Attentive kept up a six-hour cannonade on Nisus and the battery. Many of the 300 men in the battery fled, as did most of the crew of Nisus before the British could take possession. The British destroyed the battery before withdrawing. British casualties amounted to two men from Thetis being wounded on shore, and two men being wounded on Attentive. (Note: Prize money for the ordnance captured was paid in 1814. A first-class share was worth £20 19s 3½d; a sixth-class share, that of an ordinary seaman, was worth 6s 6½d.) The Royal Navy took Nisus into service as HMS Guadeloupe. In 1847 the Admiralty awarded the NGSM with clasp "13 Dec. Boat Service 1809" to all surviving claimants from the boat action.

Later, Bacchus repelled an attack by two French privateer schooners. In the attack the British had five men severely wounded.

Bacchus then participated in the capture of Guadeloupe. This led to the award in 1847 of the NGSM with clasp "Guadaloupe".

On two occasions Bacchus had to ward off attacks by French rowboats that approached her. She also captured some prizes.

== Fate ==
Bacchus was broken up in 1812.
