= Palinure-class brig =

The Palinure-class consisted of 20 brigs built for the French Navy. They were designed by François Pestel in 1803. The Royal Navy captured 18 of the vessels during the Napoleonic Wars and took 14 of them into service; the two vessels not captured had been transferred by France to the navy of the Kingdom of Italy in 1810. All bar two of the Royal Navy brigs were out of service by 1817; of the exceptions Achates was sold in 1818 and Griffon in 1819.

Members of the class include:

- French brig Palinure (1804)
- French brig Phaeton (1804)
- French brig Voltigeur (1804)
- French brig Nisus (1805)
- French brig Serpent (1807)
- French brig Griffon (1806)

== See also ==
- French brig Milan (1807)
- French brig Pandour (1804)
