= HMS Pultusk =

Sloop of the Royal Navy

Pultusk
History

France
- Name: Austerlitz
- Namesake: Battle of Austerlitz
- Builder: American
- Launched: 1805 (Note: The NMM database gives the launch year for Austerlitz as 1795, This is almost certainly incorrect.)

United Kingdom
- Name: HMS Pultusk
- Namesake: Battle of Pultusk
- Acquired: 5 April 1807 by capture
- Honours and awards: Naval General Service Medal (NGSM), with clasps: "Martinique"; "13 Dec. Boat Service 1809"; "Guadaloupe"
- Fate: Broken up 1810

General characteristics
- Tons burthen: 199 (bm)
- Length: 83 ft 7 in (25.5 m) (overall); 65 ft 9 1/2 in (20.1 m) (keel)
- Beam: 23 ft 10 in (7.3 m)
- Depth of hold: 9 ft 9 1/2 in (3.0 m)
- Sail plan: Sloop
- Complement: French service:125; British service:86
- Armament: French service: 18 × 6-pounder guns; British service: 16 × 24-pounder carronades + 2 × 6-pounder chase guns

HMS Pultusk was the American-built French privateer sloop Austerlitz, which had been launched in 1805 and which the Royal Navy captured in 1807 and took into service as HMS Pultusk. Pultusk served in three campaigns, two of which resulted, some four decades later, in the award of medals, and one boat action that too received a medal. She was broken up in 1810.

== Austerlitz ==
On 31 August 1806, Austerlitz was off Martinique when she encountered the 10 or 12-gun schooner HMS Prevost, which was under the command of Lieutenant Samuel Stout. Austerlitz was in the company of a sloop and a brig. Even though Prevost had had to throw overboard four of her guns in an earlier storm, Stout decided to fight. The subsequent action lasted an hour before Stout struck after having lost three men killed and seven wounded. Austerlitz took Prevost into Guadeloupe.

On 5 April 1807 Circe captured Austerlitz after an 18-hour pursuit. Austerlitz was armed with eighteen 6-pounder guns and had a crew of 125 men. Hugh Pigot of Circe reported that "This Vessel has done more Mischief to the Trade than any other from Guadaloupe during the War". The British had chased her several times without catching her and she would have escaped this time too had she not sprung her main topsail-yard and fore-top-gallant mast. The Royal Navy took Austerlitz into service as HMS Pultusk, changing her name from one celebrating a Napoleonic victory to one celebrating a setback for French forces.

== HMS Pultusk ==
Pultusk was commissioned in 1807 at Antigua under the command of Charles Napier (acting). His promotion to commander was confirmed on 30 November.

Pultusk's first campaign was the capture of the Danish islands of St Thomas and Santa Cruz (St. Croix). On 15 December Fawn arrived at Barbados with the news of war with Denmark. Admiral Sir Alexander Cochrane had been in readiness since 2 September and immediately set sail in Belleisle, together with a squadron including Prince George, Northumberland, Canada, Ramillies, Cerberus, Ethalion, and a number of other vessels including Pultusk. The expedition also included troops from the 70th and 90th Regiments of Foot under the overall army commander, General Henry Boyer. St Thomas surrendered on 22 December and St Croix on 25 December. (Note: The two commanders in chief each received £1293 3s 5¾d. A naval captain or commander, such as Napier, received a first-class share, which was worth £398 10 3½d. A fifth-class share, that of a seaman, was worth £1 18s 10d.) The British then occupied the Danish West Indies until 20 November 1815, when they returned the islands to Denmark.

On 17 July 1808 Napier took two boats from Pultusk to join the three boats from Fawn in a cutting out expedition on the NE end of Port Rico. Lieutenant James Robertson, First Lieutenant of Fawn, was in charge, although Napier outranked Robertson. Napier was only accompanying Robertson to gain a knowledge of the coast and agreed that he would have the status of a volunteer, and that Robertson would be responsible for the operation. The British cut out a Spanish merchant schooner from under the guns of two batteries, and then Robertson and Napier landed and spiked the guns in one battery and rendered the guns' carriages unusable.

In August 1808 Napier became captain of the brig-sloop Recruit; his replacement on Pultusk was Commander George Pringle. Pringle took command on 5 August while she was undergoing repairs in English Harbour, Antigua. Once she was ready for sea, Pultusk went to St John's roads, where she took on board a number of French prisoners for Barbados. Her route took her between Deseada and Guadeloupe, where a number of the prisoners were from so there was some concern that the prisoners might try and to seize her. Although there was talk among the prisoners about an attempt, nothing came of it.

At the end of the year Pultusk carried despatches to Marie-Galante. There she came under the operational control of Captain Hugh Pigot, now in Latona. Pultusk helped enforce the British blockade of Guadeloupe and took several vessels attempting to enter Basse-Terre.

In January–February 1809 Pultusk participated in the invasion of Martinique. Four decades later the operation was among the actions recognised by the clasp "Martinique" attached to the Naval General Service Medal (NGSM), awarded upon application to all British participants still living in 1847.

One of these vessels Putusk captured while enforcing the blockade was the brig Admiral Decres, which she ran on shore under some batteries. Pringle sent in his boats, which succeeded in refloating her and taking her out. They faced no resistance from Admiral Decres though she was armed as her crew had already fled ashore. (Note: This apparently occurred on 12 February 1809. The officer in charge was Lieutenant Robert Leech, and the letter of marque had been armed with eight guns and had had a crew of 20 men.)

Pringle moved to Amaranthe and Commander David Sloan replaced him on Pultusk. Commander William Elliot replaced Sloan in October.

A British squadron under Captain George Miller in Thetis arrived at Deshaies on 12 December to reconnoiter the harbour. There they found the French navy's brig Nisus about to leave, having loaded a cargo of coffee. Miller sent in boats with the marines from Thetis, Pultusk, Achates, and Bacchus, and 78 sailors. The landing party first captured the fort at Deshaies, whereupon Nisus surrendered when its guns were turned on her. During the operation, Attentive kept up a six-hour cannonade on Nisus and the battery. Many of the 300 men in the battery fled, as did most of the crew of Nisus before the British could take possession. The British destroyed the battery before withdrawing. British casualties amounted to two men from Thetis being wounded on shore, and two men being wounded on Attentive. (Note: Prize money for the ordnance captured was paid in 1814. A first-class share was worth £20 19s 3½d; a sixth-class share, that of an ordinary seaman, was worth 6s 6½d.) The Royal Navy took Nisus into service as HMS Guadeloupe. In 1847 the Admiralty awarded the NGSM with clasp "13 Dec. Boat Service 1809" to all surviving claimants from the boat action.

On 18 December Pultusk brought to Admiral Alexander Cochrane, in Pompee at Marie-Galante the news that two of the French frigates that had captured and burned Junon were anchored three leagues NW of the town of Basse-Terre. Cochrane immediately set together with a number of other vessels. There Cochrane found that Captain Samuel James Ballard in Sceptre had a squadron in place and was preparing to attack Seine and Loire, anchored in Anse à la Barque ("Barque Cove"). The British attack was successful in that the French abandoned Seine and Loire and set fire to them.

Between then and 11 January 1810 Pultusk came under the command of John McGeorge. On that day she was part of a small squadron under Captain Volant Vashon Ballard of Blonde. Ballard sent Scorpion to capture the 16-gun brig Oreste. Scorpion succeeded in her mission and the Royal Navy took Oreste into service as HMS Wellington. Blonde, Thetis and Pultusk shared in the prize money by agreement.

Pultusk then participated in the capture of Guadeloupe. This led to the award in 1847 of the NGSM with clasp "Guadaloupe".

== Fate ==
Pultusk was broken up at Antigua later in 1810.
