= Charles Ross (Royal Navy officer) =

British Royal Navy officer

Vice-Admiral Charles Ross CB
- Born: July 1776; Portsmouth, Hampshire, England
- Died: 2 March 1849 (aged 72); Devonport, Devon, England
- Military career
- Allegiance: United Kingdom
- Branch: Royal Navy
- Service years: 1788–1849
- Rank: Vice-Admiral
- Commands: HMS Diligence; HMS Druid; HMS Desiree; HMS Pique; HMS Marlborough; HMS Sceptre; HMS Albion; HMS Northumberland; Pacific Station
- Conflicts: French Revolutionary Wars; Siege of Toulon; Battle of Genoa; Battle of Hyères Islands; Napoleonic Wars; Blockade of Saint-Domingue; War of 1812
- Awards: Companion of the Order of the Bath

Vice-Admiral Charles Bayne Hodgson Ross CB (July 1776 – 2 March 1849) was a Royal Navy officer who served during the French Revolutionary and Napoleonic Wars, who later commanded the ship that took Napoleon Bonaparte into his finale exile on St Helena, and who went on to be Commander-in-Chief, Pacific Station.

== Biography ==
=== Background and early career ===
Charles Ross was the son of Lieutenant Robert Hunter Ross, RN, and a great-great grandson of William Ross, 12th Lord Ross. He entered the navy on 1 March 1788 as a captain's servant aboard the sloop Echo, commanded by Captain Robert Carthew Reynolds. He remained in her, stationed at Newfoundland, until December. From February to April 1790 he served aboard the 74-gun Edgar, the guard ship at Portsmouth, under Captain Anthony James Pye Molloy, then moved into the Salisbury (50), flagship of Vice-Admiral Mark Milbanke, Commodore-Governor at Newfoundland, before returning to the Edgar, under Captain Albemarle Bertie.

=== French Revolutionary Wars ===
Between March 1793 and April 1796 he served as master's mate and then midshipman, firstly in the fire-ship Conflagration and then the frigate Tartar (28), both commanded by Captain Thomas Francis Fremantle, then aboard St George (98) and Britannia (100), the flagships of Sir Hyde Parker, and the Victory (100), flagship of Sir John Jervis. While attached to the Tartar and St. George he served on shore during the capture and evacuation of Toulon, and took part in the land operations connected with the capture of Saint-Florent, Bastia, and Calvi, in the island of Corsica, and fought in the battles off Genoa and the Hyères Islands in March and July 1795.

On 14 July 1796, he was promoted to lieutenant in the Saturn (74), Captain James Douglas, stationed off Cádiz; and on 26 August 1797 was transferred to Prompte (20), Captain George Eyre, and then on 5 June 1798 to Queen (98), flagship of Sir Hyde Parker, in the West Indies. He served on shore at Môle-Saint-Nicolas and contributed to the capture and destruction of several privateers and armed boats on the coast of Saint-Domingue. In January 1800 he was appointed acting-commander of the brig-sloop Diligence (18), and was confirmed in his rank on 11 June. However, on 8 October his ship was wrecked on the Honda Bank, off the northern coast of Cuba, and was abandoned and burned. After commanding the frigate Druid (32), for about six months, on 5 July 1802 he was appointed acting-captain of Desiree (36), and was officially posted on 15 October.

=== Napoleonic Wars ===
In December 1803 Ross was appointed to command of the frigate Pique (36), employed at the blockade of Saint-Domingue and witnessed the surrender of the French squadron with the remains of General Rochambeau's army from Cap Français.

In early 1804 Ross took part in an expedition led by Captain John Bligh to capture the Dutch island of Curaçao. The British believed that the garrison there was only 160 strong, and weakened by disease, so their force consisted only of the 74s Theseus and Hercule, frigates Blanche and Pique, and the schooner Gipsy. On their arrival at the Willemstad on 31 January the British learned that they had been misinformed about the local strength, which consisted of 250 regular troops, reinforced by a local militia and the crews of the vessels in the harbour. The Dutch refused to surrender, and unable to force the harbour, which was defended by shore batteries, the frigate Hatslaar and two French privateers, the British were compelled to attempt a landing. Leaving the two frigates to blockade the harbour, the British sailed to a nearby cove and landed a 605-man strong force of seamen and marines which captured Fort Piscadero. The British then landed guns, and erected artillery batteries on heights to the west of the town. Over the next few days the British, the Dutch in Fort Amsterdam and their French allies fought an artillery duel and several skirmishes with little result, so the British turned their guns on the town and shipping, destroying some of the former by fire. However, disease, casualties, and lack of provisions soon took their toll on the British, who were eventually forced to abandon the enterprise on 25 February.

Pique continued to operate in the Caribbean, making numerous captures, including the French cutter Le Terreur of 10 guns and 75 men, on 18 March 1804, the Spanish ship-of-war Diligentia (in company with Diana), and the 18-gun corvette Orquijo on 8 February 1805.

On the morning of 26 March 1806 Pique was en route from Saint-Domingue to Curaçao, when she spotted two 16-gun French brig-corvettes Phaeton and Voltigeur, and gave chase. By 13:00, Pique commenced firing at long range, and at 14:00 she closed with the two brigs. After about twenty minutes, Phaëton was crippled, so about 30 men from Pique boarded her, while Ross stood off to pursue the Voltigeur. No sooner had the boarding party stepped aboard than the French crew, concealed behind fallen masts and sails, let fly with a volley of musket fire, killing ten and wounding fourteen. Ross, when aware of what had happened, sent a boat with more men, who quickly compelled the French to surrender. He then sailed after Voltigeur, who was eventually overtaken and captured without further opposition. A clasp to the Naval General Service Medal, marked "Pique 26 March 1806" was authorized for this action in 1849.

During his command of the Desiree and Pique, Ross captured, in different prizes, as many as 140 guns and 1,500 men; four of his captures were added to the Royal Navy. He eventually left Pique in August 1807.

==== War of 1812 ====
From 13 August 1812 he served as flag-captain to Sir George Cockburn, commanding the 74s Marlborough, Sceptre, Albion, while taking part in operations on the coast of North America during the War of 1812. In this capacity he was present at the Battle of Rappahannock River in April 1813, and took part in the various actions against Joshua Barney's Chesapeake Bay Flotilla in mid-1814. In January 1815, while commanding the Albion he conducted a boat expedition up St. Marys River, Georgia, before returning to Cumberland Island, with a ship loaded with timber, and an English East Indiaman which had been captured by an American privateer. He also embarked all the produce collected at the town of St. Mary's in the vessels taken there by Captain Robert Barrie, blew up the fort on Point Peter and a battery (mounting six 24-pounders and two brass 6-pounders) and destroyed the barracks and storehouses, together with some merchandise and guns that were not deemed fit to bring away.

=== Postwar career ===
Following the end of the war Ross, now commanding Cockburn's flagship Northumberland, was responsible for conveying Napoleon Bonaparte into exile at St. Helena. His first impression of his passenger was described in a letter to a friend:

He is fat, rather what we call pot-bellied, and altho' his leg is well-shaped, it is rather clumsy, and his walk appears rather affected, something between a waddle and a swagger – but probably not being used to the motion of a ship might have given him that appearance. He is very sallow and [has] quite light grey eyes, rather thin, greasy-looking brown hair, and altogether a very nasty, priestlike-looking fellow.

Northumberland sailed from Plymouth on 8 August, arriving at St Helena on 15 October 1815. During the voyage Ross's relations with the former emperor were limited since neither spoke each other's language, though Ross noted that on leaving the ship Bonaparte "returned me his thanks for my attention to him with rather a better grace than I should have given him credit for."

Ross was made a Companion of the Order of the Bath on 8 December 1815. From 1817 to 1820 he served in the Ordinary at Portsmouth; and from July 1822 to January 1837, served as Commissioner of the Navy at Jamaica, Malta, and Plymouth. He was promoted to rear-admiral on 10 January 1837, and from 4 September 1839 until 1841 was commander-in-chief on the Pacific Station, flying his flag in the President (50). He was promoted to vice-admiral on 24 April 1847, but died two years later on 2 March 1849.

== Personal life ==
In January 1803 he married Sarah Cockburn, the distant cousin and sister-in-law of Admiral Sir George Cockburn, in Kingston, Jamaica. They had four children; Elizabeth Ross (1803–1844), Frances Mary Cockburn Ross (b.1809), Commander Charles William Decourcy Ross, RN (1812–1848), and Georgina Mary Cockburn Ross (b.1819).

== See also ==
- O'Byrne, William Richard (1849). "Ross, Charles Bayne Hodgson" . A Naval Biographical Dictionary . John Murray – via Wikisource.

== Bibliography ==
- James, William (1837). Naval History of Great Britain. London: Richard Bentley.
- Shorter, Clement, ed. (1908). Napoleon and his fellow travellers; being a reprint of certain narratives of the voyages of the dethroned emperor on the Bellerophon and the Northumberland to exile in St. Helena: the romantic stories told by George Home, Captain Ross, Lord Lyttelton, and William Warden. London: Cassell & Co.

Military offices
Preceded by Graham Hamond as Commander-in-Chief, South America Station	Commander-in-Chief, Pacific Station; 1837–1841	Succeeded by Richard Thomas
