= Swallow (1779 EIC packet) =

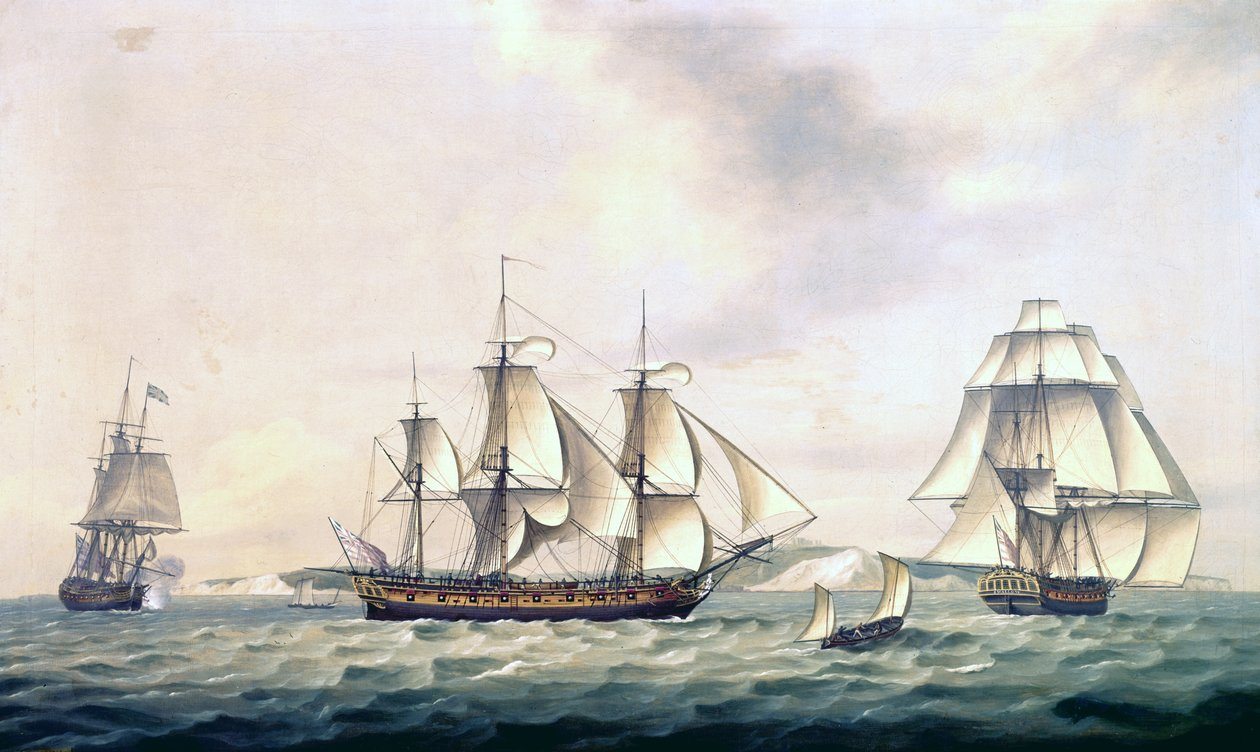
- East India Company's Packet Swallow, 1788; Thomas Luny

History

Great Britain
- Name: Swallow
- Owner: British East India Company
- Builder: Bombay Dockyard
- Launched: 1779 (Note: Hackman gives a launch date of 2 April 1777. However, Phipps gives a launch year of 1779, conforming with Winfield. Elsewhere, Phipps gives the launch year as 1777.)
- Fate: Sold 1804

United Kingdom
- Name: HMS Lilly
- Acquired: May 1804 by purchase
- Nickname(s): HMS Silly
- Fate: Sold November 1811

United Kingdom
- Name: Swallow
- Owner: 1814: J. Lynley
- Fate: Wrecked 16 June 1823

General characteristics
- Tons burthen: 331, or 345, or 37110/94 (bm)
- Length: 99 ft 0 in (30.2 m) (overall); 80 ft 7 1/28 in (24.6 m) (keel)
- Beam: 29 ft 5 in (9.0 m)
- Complement: EIC service:50; 1799:60; RN service:121
- Armament: EIC service: 8 guns; 1799: 16 × 6-pounder guns + 6 swivel guns; RN service: Upper deck: 16 × 24-pounder carronades; Spar deck: 6 × 18-pounder carronades + 2 × 6-pounder chase guns

Swallow was a teak-built packet ship that the British East India Company (EIC) launched at Bombay in 1779. She made nine trips between India and Britain for the EIC between 1782 and 1803. Her most notable exploit occurred on her seventh voyage, when she helped capture seven Dutch East Indiamen on 15 June 1795. The Royal Navy purchased the ship in 1804 and commissioned her as HMS Lilly. She served in the navy until she was sold in 1811. During this time she participated in the capture of La Désirade island, and participated in a quixotic and unsuccessful attempt of General Francisco de Miranda to liberate the Province of Venezuela from Spain in 1806. Her whereabouts between 1811 and 1815 are obscure, but in 1815 J. Lyney, of London, purchased her and she sailed to the West Indies and to India as an EIC-licensed vessel until she wrecked on her way to Calcutta in 1823.

== East India Company packet ==
=== Un-numbered voyages (1779–81) ===
Swallow came under the command of Captain Sober Hall. In March 1780 she was dispatched to Britain.

On 24 January 1781, Swallow, under the command of Captain Sober Hall, sailed from Limerick for Madras, with the Right Hon. Lord Macartney, the new governor of Madras, Mr. Staunton and Mr. Lacelles, his Lordship's secretaries, Col. Cowper, Mr. Kerin of the county Clare, and Mr. Exshaw of Dublin, with several other passengers. Lord Macartney arrived at Madras on 22 June 1781.

=== Voyage #1 (1782–85) ===
The first voyage to the UK for which National Archive records exist was in 1782. In that year Captain Sober Hall sailed from India, reaching Limerick, which she left on 4 October 1782, and arriving at The Downs on 10 April 1783. Swallow left the Downs on 16 September 1783 under the command of Captain Richard Bendy. Bendy was carrying to India the preliminary articles of a treaty between George III and the States General of the United Provinces, and the definitive peace treaty between the crowns of Great Britain, France, and Spain (Treaties of Versailles).

=== Voyage #2 (1785–86) ===
Swallow left Bengal on 16 August 1785 under the command of Capt Richard Bendy, though Captain Robert Anderson may have replaced him at some point on the voyage. She reached the Cape on 17 October, and St Helena on 11 November. She arrived at the Downs on 8 January 1786.

=== Voyage #3 (1786–87) ===
Captain Robert Anderson left Portsmouth on 7 May 1786, bound for Madras and Bengal. Swallow reached Johanna on 29 July, and Madras on 21 August, arriving at Calcutta on 12 September. Outward bound, she passed Kedgeree on 19 November and again reached Madras on 1 December. She then stopped at St Helena on 31 January 1787 before reaching the Downs on 30 March.

=== Voyage #4 (1788-1790) ===
Captain Robert Anderson and Swallow left the Downs on 26 June 1788 and Falmouth on 26 August, reaching the Cape on 5 November and arriving at Calcutta on 25 January 1789. Outward bound, she passed Kedgeree on 22 February, reached Madras on 9 March, Negapatam on 29 April, Madras again on 4 May, and Calcutta again on 12 June. She left Diamond Harbour on 19 August, reached St Helena on 28 October, and arrived at the Downs on 10 January 1790. She was at her moorings on 17 January.

=== Voyage #5 (1790–92) ===
Captain George Curtis left Portsmouth on 12 June 1790, bound for Madras and Bengal. She was carrying the Governor and his suite. On 17 July she spoke the slave ship Betsey at 5°31′N 17°0′W as Betsey was on her way to West Africa to acquire slaves. Swallow reached the Cape on 24 August, Madras on 5 October, and Calcutta on 7 November. On 8 December Swallow passed Culpee (an anchorage near Calcutta), reached Madras on 14 December, Negaptam on 21 December, Madras again on 5 January 1791, Cuddalore on 2 February, Madras yet again on 4 February, Port Cornwallis on 25 February, Penang on 8 March, Madras on 26 March, Nagore on 27 April, Madras on 2 May, Masulipatam on 10 July, Madras on 17 July, Negapatam on 19 August, and Madras for the last time on this voyage on 25 August. Swallow reached St Helena on 29 November and arrived at Bristol on 25 January 1792.

=== Voyage #6 (1792–94) ===
Captain George Curtis left the Downs on 18 October 1792 for Bengal, Madras, and Bombay. She arrived at Calcutta on 10 March, Madras on 27 April, Madras, and Bombay on 16 June. She left Bombay on 7 August and reached Anjengo on 15 August, and Madras 24 August. She left Madras on 10 October, reached st Helena on 15 December, and arrived at Torbay on 4 February 1794, and the Downs on 16 February.

=== Voyage #7 and the capture of the Dutch Indiamen (1795–97) ===
Captain William Clifton left Falmouth on 2 January 1795. On 2 June Swallow arrived at St Helena from the Cape of Good Hope with the news than a convoy of Dutch East Indiamen had left the Cape, sailing for the Netherlands.

The eight unescorted Dutch East Indiaman that had sailed on 22 May had the misfortune to encounter HMS Sceptre, the East Indiaman General Goddard, and Swallow near Saint Helena. On 3 June, Sceptre, General Goddard, Manship (also an EIC ship), and Swallow set out. Five other HEIC ships set out later, of which only Busbridge met up with the squadron. On 7 June, the squadron captured the "richly laden" Julie. Three days later, the British captured the Dutch Indiaman Hougly, which Swallow escorted into St Helena, before returning to the squadron with additional seamen.

In the afternoon of 14 June, the British squadron sighted seven sail. At 1 a.m. the next morning General Goddard sailed through the Dutch fleet, which fired on her. She did not fire back. Later that morning, after some exchange of shots between the British and Dutch vessels, the Dutch surrendered. The EIC ships Busbridge, Captain Samuel Maitland, and Asia, Captain John Davy Foulkes, arrived on the scene and helped board the Dutch vessels. There were no casualties on either side. The British then brought their prizes into St Helena on 17 June.

On 1 July, Sceptre, General Goddard and the prizes sailed from St Helena to gather in other returning British East Indiamen. They then returned to St Helena, where George Vancouver and Discovery, which had arrived there in the meantime, joined them. The entire convoy, now some 20 vessels or so strong, sailed from there on 22 August for Shannon.

Because the captures occurred before Britain had declared war on the Batavian Republic, the vessels became Droits to the Crown. Still, prize money, in the amount of two-thirds of the value of the Dutch ships amounted to £76,664 14s. Of this, £61,331 15s 2d was distributed among the officers and crew of Sceptre, General Goddard, Busbridge, Asia, and Swallow. The remainder went to the garrison at St Helena, and various vessels in the St Helena roads. Thirty-three years later, in July 1828, there was a small final payment. (Note: A first-class share was worth £4 3s 6d; a fourth-class share was worth 3s 1d.)

Swallow sailed from Bengal in September 1796, reaching Rangoon on 10 October and leaving on 12 November, reaching Penang on 24 November, Madras on 19 December, Trincomalee on 22 December, Madras on 4 January 1797, and St Helena on 15 March, arriving on 2 May at Torbay.

=== Voyage #8 (1799-1803) ===
Captain John Luard left Falmouth on 6 September 1799 bound for China, and then Mokha and Madras. Luard sailed with a letter of marque issued 25 July 1799.

Luard and Swallow apparently sighted Yap around February 1800. (At some point Arthur Muter replaced Luard as captain.) She left Calcutta on 19 November 1801, reached Mokha on 13 January 1802, and Madras on 28 March. She left Madras on 13 October, reaching Calcutta on 7 November. She passed Saugor on 1 March 1803, reached St Helena on 12 May, and Falmouth on 14 July. She arrived at the Downs on 29 July.

== HMS Lilly ==
The Admiralty purchased Swallow in May 1804 and named her Lilly (or equally Lily), presumably while she was fitting out, which was after the loss of a Lilly in July. Retaining her name was apparently not an option as a Swallow had just been laid down. (Note: Hackman has Danish buyers purchasing Swallow in 1803, with her being taken as a prize in 1807, and the Royal Navy then purchasing her. This report is at variance with Royal Navy records.)

Lilly underwent fitting out, including receiving a heavier armament than the EIC provided, between 21 August and 11 December. Commander John Morrison commissioned her in October, for the Leeward Islands.

In March 1806 Lieutenant Donald Campbell replaced Morrison. During this period, two privateers captured a tender that was serving Lilly and the crew aboard her were prisoners at Cumaná (now part of Venezuela), for several months. After they returned to Lilly she encountered the ship Leander, of 22 guns and 200 men. (Note: Some reports state that Campbell captured the brig Leander, but that is incorrect.) This vessel, outfitted in New York, was carrying General Francisco de Miranda and his revolutionaries after a botched landing attempt in Ocumare de la Costa whose objective was to free the province of Venezuela from Spain rule. The botched landing only resulted in two Spanish garda costas, Argos and Celoso, capturing two of Miranda's vessels, Bacchus and Bee. The Spanish government put 60 of the men they had captured on trial in Puerto Cabello, and sentenced ten to being hanged and quartered. Lilly escorted Leander and Miranda to Grenada and then to Barbados, where Miranda met with Admiral Alexander Cochrane. As Spain was then at war with Britain, the governor of Trinidad Thomas Hyslop agree to provide some support for a second attempt.

Lilly left Port of Spain on 24 July, together with Express, Attentive, Prevost, and Leander, carrying General Miranda and some 220 officers and men. General Miranda decided to land in La Vela de Coro and the squadron anchored there on 1 August. The next day the frigate Bacchante joined them; she stayed some three days. On 3 August sixty Trinidadian volunteers, under the Count de Rouveray, sixty men under Col. Dowie, and thirty seamen and marines from Lily, under Lieutenant Beddingfelt landed. This force cleared the beach of Spanish forces and captured a battery of four 9 and 12-pounder guns; the attackers had four men severely wounded, all from Lilly. Shortly thereafter boats from Bacchante landed American volunteers and seamen and marines. The Spanish retreated, which enabled this force to capture two forts mounting 14 guns. General Miranda then marched on Coro, which he captured. However, on 8 August a Spanish force of almost 2000 men arrived. They captured a master of transport and 14 seamen who were getting water, unbeknownst to Campbell. Lily landed 20 men on the morning of 10 August; this landing party killed a dozen Spaniards, but was able to rescue only one of the captive seamen. Col. Downie and 50 men were sent, but the colonel judged the enemy force too strong and withdrew. When another 400 men came from Maracaibo, General Miranda realized that his force was too small to achieve anything further. Lilly and her squadron then carried him and his men safely to Aruba.

Although Campbell was next in line for a promotion, the letter notifying the Admiralty of his acting command of Lilly did not arrive in time. Instead, Commander William Henry Shirreff was appointed to Lilly on 3 March 1806, but did not take command until towards the end of the year. Campbell took command of Pert, and his promotion to commander was confirmed on 4 May 1807.

Lilly was part of the squadron under Admiral Sir Alexander Cochrane that captured the Danish islands of St Thomas on 22 December and Santa Cruz on 25 December 1807. The Danes did not resist and the invasion was bloodless.

On 29 March 1808, Cerberus, in company with Lilly, Pelican, Express, Swinger and Mosambique, sailed from Marie-Galante to attack the island of La Désirade. They arrived on 30 March and landed seamen and marines under the command of Captain Sherriff. As the squadron approached they exchanged fire with a battery of 9-pounders covering the entrance to the harbour. The ships' guns silenced the battery and the French surrendered.

The inhabitants of La Désirade took an oath of neutrality, so Admiral Alexander Cochrane did not place a garrison on the island, though the British did destroy the island's shore batteries. Cochrane also left Lilly, Express, and Mosambique there both to deny the island to French privateers and to forestall any French attempt to recapture it.

On 21 April Mosambique chased and captured the French letter of marque brig Jean Jacques. She and her prize, the British brig Brothers of Liverpool, were seeking to take shelter at La Désirade, not knowing that the island was in British hands. Jean Jacques was pierced for 18 guns but carried only six long 9-pounders. She was 36 days out of Bordeaux and sailing for Guadeloupe. Sherriff, the commander of the squadron to which Mosambique belonged, reported that he was particularly pleased at the capture as Jean Jacques had been sent out for "the express Purpose of cruising in these Seas, and, from her superior Sailing, would have proved a great Annoyance to the Trade." While Mosambique was capturing Jean Jacques, the squadron saw a brig on fire. The squadron's boats went to the brig's assistance, extinguished the flames, and discovered that it was Brothers. In the entire affair, the British had no casualties and the French suffered only one man wounded.

Sherriff received promotion to post captain on 15 November 1809.

== Return to civilian service ==
The Principal Officers and Commissioners of His Majesty's Navy offered the "Lily Sloop, 352 Tons", lying at Portsmouth, for sale on 17 November 1811. She sold that month.

Lilly's whereabouts in 1812 and 1813 are currently obscure.

In 1814 J. Lyney, London, purchased Lilly and returned her to her original name of Swallow. She then traded to South America and India under a license from the EIC.

=== Lloyd's Register ===
| Year | Master | Owner | Trade | Notes |
|---|---|---|---|---|
| 1812 | | | | |
| 1813 | | | | |
| 1814 | J. Firth | J. Lyney | London - Surinam | 261 tons |
| 1815 | J. Firth | J. Lyney | London – Surinam | 261 tons; 8 guns |
| 1816 | J. Firth | J. Lyney | London - Surinam; London - Batavia | 261 tons |
| 1817 | | | | Not printed |
| 1818 | J. Firth; Oliver | J. Lyney | London - "Bvaria"; London - India | |
| 1819 | J. Oliver; Nicholson | J. Lyney | London - India; London - Isle of France (Mauritius) | 361 tons |
| 1820 | Nicholson; Ross | J. Lyney | London - Isle of France; London - Bombay | 361 tons |
| 1821 | Ross | J. Lyney | London - Bombay | 361 tons |
| 1822 | Ross | J. Lyney | London – Bombay | 361 tons |
| 1823 | Ross | J. Lyney | London – Bombay; London - Calcutta | 365 tons |

Lloyd's Register for 1819 had a second entry for Swallow. It showed her as being of 361 tons (bm), with master W. Oliver, and owner J. Lyney, sailing on 15 February 1818 to Bombay for the EIC.

== Fate ==
Swallow was wrecked on 16 June 1823 on the James and Mary Shoal, near Fultah, on the River Hooghly, while sailing from London for Calcutta. She was totally lost, and three of crew died; the remainder, and her passengers, apparently were able to get ashore, though they lost all their possessions. Swallow was the EIC's most successful fast-sailing packet.
