= HMS Attentive (1804) =

Brig of the Royal Navy

History

United Kingdom
- Name: HMS Attentive
- Ordered: June 1804
- Builder: Bools and Good, Bridport
- Laid down: July 1804
- Launched: 18 September 1804
- Commissioned: November 1804
- Fate: Broken up August 1812

General characteristics
- Class & type: Archer-class gun brig
- Tons burthen: 178 78/94 (bm)
- Length: 80 ft 10 1/2 in (24.7 m) (overall); 65 ft 10 1/8 in (20.1 m)
- Beam: 22 ft 7 in (6.9 m)
- Draught: 9 ft 5 in (2.9 m)
- Sail plan: Brig
- Complement: 50
- Armament: 10 × 18-pounder carronades + 2 chase guns

HMS Attentive was an Archer-class gun-brig of the Royal Navy, launched in 1804. she captured a small privateer and participated in some other captures in the Leeward Islands before returning to Britain, where she was broken up in 1812.

== Career ==
Attentive was commissioned in November 1804 under Lieutenant John Harris. He sailed her for the Leeward Islands in May 1805.

In July and early August 1806, Attentive was part of a squadron that included Prevost and Express, and that was under the command of Commander Donald Campbell (acting), in Lilly. Together, they supported General Francisco de Miranda, aboard his ship Leander, in his quixotic and unsuccessful attempt to liberate the Captaincy General of Venezuela from Spain.

Lieutenant Robert Carr replaced Harris, in 1807.

In the spring of 1807, Attentive's boats cut out two doggers, from the small port of La Trinité, Martinique. There was an English negro on board one who offered to pilot the British in to take an unprotected sloop with a cargo of sugar that was lying a few miles to the windward. That night, twelve men in two jolly boats set out to capture the sloop. Adverse tides made for slow going and it was only at dawn that they were able to enter the harbour. After one of the boats went in chase of a small craft, Lieutenant Cox, the overall commander of the cutting out party, suddenly noticed that a guarda costa was anchored between him and the sloop. The garda costa's crew lined her sides and fired small arms at the British, but apparently did not fire the two 6-pounder guns that were pointing at their attackers. Cox and his five men nevertheless pushed forward and within minutes captured her. Cox then set sail and was able to rejoin Attentive within two hours. He had had only one man wounded in the attack.

At some point in 1807, Attentive captured a row-boat privateer in the Gulf of Paria.

On 17 October 1807 Attentive was between Trinidad and Tobago when she encountered the Spanish privateer lugger Nuestra Senora del Carmen. Nuestra Senora was armed with two carriage guns, as well as swivel guns and small arms, and had a crew of 63 men under the command of Don Thomaso Lisaro. She also had 40 sweeps to propel her in a calm. During the encounter, she had three men wounded before she struck. She had left Barcelona only 15 days earlier and had captured the sloop Harriot, of St. Vincent. (Note: Head money for the capture was paid in September 1827. A first-class share was worth £76 15s 2¼d; a fifth-class share, that of an able seaman, was worth £1 10s 10½d.)

In October 1808, Attentive captured another small privateer, a row boat armed with one long gun and having a crew of 35 men.

On 31 May 1809 Captain John Richards of Forester sent boats from his small squadron under the command of Lieutenant Robert Carr of Attentive to capture a French letter of marque and a schooner from under the protection of four long-guns and 300 soldiers at the Port du Molas. Carr captured the vessels and then landed, spiked the guns, and blew up the French magazine.

A British squadron under Captain George Miller in Thetis arrived at Deshaies on 12 December 1809 to reconnoiter the harbour. There they found the French navy's brig Nisus about to leave, having loaded a cargo of coffee. Miller sent in boats with the marines from Thetis, Pultusk, Achates, and Bacchus, and 78 sailors. The landing party first captured the fort at Deshaies, whereupon Nisus surrendered when its guns were turned on her. During the operation, Attentive kept up a six-hour cannonade on Nisus and the battery. Many of the 300 men in the battery fled, as did most of the crew of Nisus before the British could take possession. The British destroyed the battery before withdrawing. British casualties amounted to two men from Thetis being wounded on shore, and two men being wounded on Attentive. (Note: Prize money for the ordnance captured was paid in 1814. A first-class share was worth £20 19s 3½d; a sixth-class share, that of an ordinary seaman, was worth 6s 6½d.) The Royal Navy took Nisus into service as HMS Guadeloupe. In 1847 the Admiralty awarded the Naval General Service Medal (NGSM) with clasp "13 Dec. Boat Service 1809" to all surviving claimants from the boat action.

In January and February 1810 Attentive participated in the British capture of Guadeloupe. In 1847 the Admiralty awarded the NGSM with clasp "Guadaloupe" to all surviving claimants from the campaign.

== Fate ==
After returning to Britain, Attentive was laid up in Ordinary at Deptford until 1812. In August 1812 she was broken up.
