= HMS Thetis (1782) =

Frigate of the Royal Navy

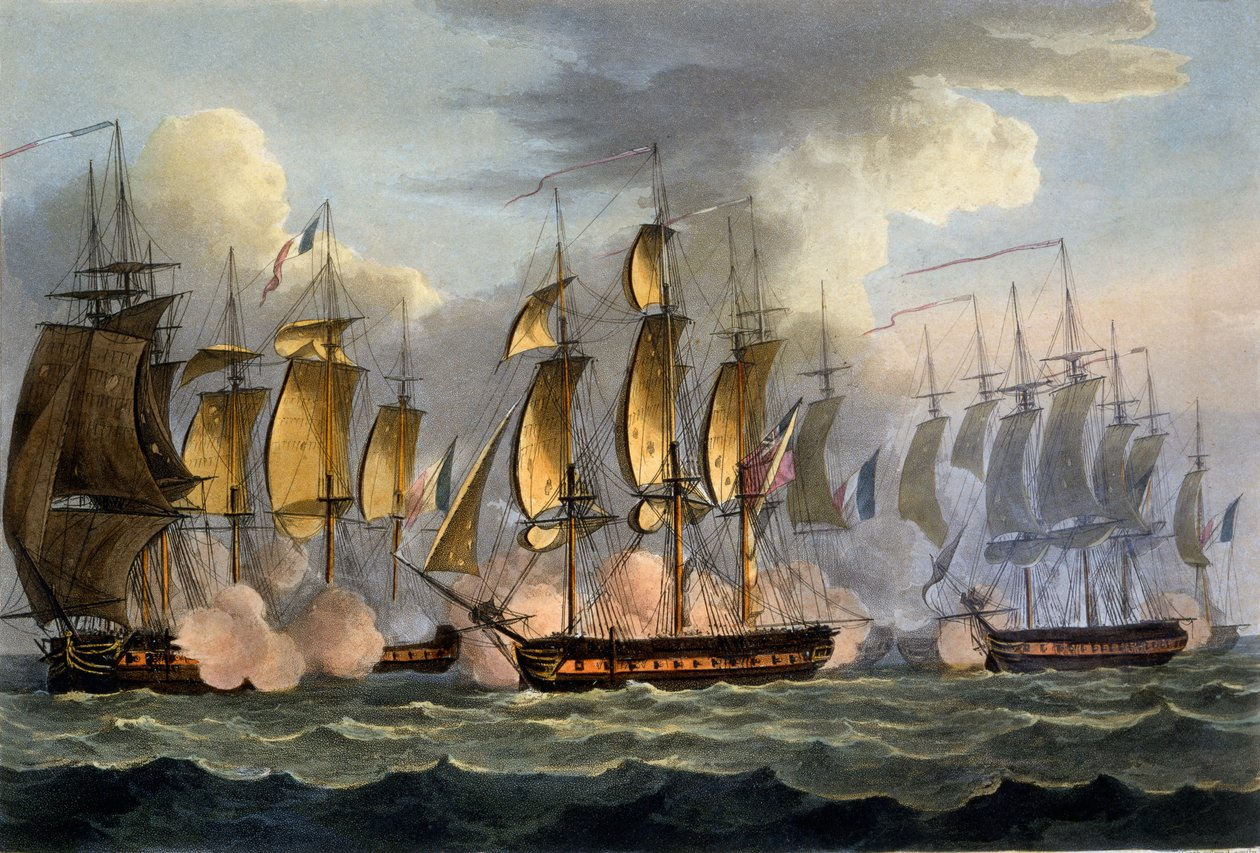
- Capture of La Prevoyante and La Raison by Thetis and Hussar, by Thomas Whitcombe

History

Great Britain
- Name: HMS Thetis
- Ordered: 1781
- Builder: Rotherhithe
- Laid down: December 1781
- Launched: 23 September 1782
- Commissioned: November 1782
- Honours and awards: Naval General Service Medal with clasps: "Egypt"; "13 Dec. Boat Service 1809"; "Anse la Barque 18 Decr. 1809"; "Guadaloupe"
- Fate: Sold 9 June 1814

General characteristics
- Class & type: 38-gun Minerve-class fifth-rate frigate
- Tons burthen: 954 (bm)
- Length: 141 ft 6 in (43.13 m)
- Beam: 39 ft 2 in (11.94 m)
- Depth of hold: 13 ft 8 in (4.17 m)
- Sail plan: Full-rigged ship
- Complement: 280
- Armament: Upper deck: 28 × 18-pounder guns; QD: 8 × 9-pounder guns + 6 × 18-pounder carronades; Fc: 2 × 9-pounder guns + 4 × 18-pounder carronades

HMS Thetis was a 38-gun fifth-rate frigate of the Royal Navy launched in 1782.

== Career ==
=== French Revolutionary Wars ===
In early 1793, Thetis captured the East Indiaman Trajan, Captain Joseph Boudel, which was coming from Pondicherry. The French privateer Robert recaptured Trajan and brought her into Bordeaux.

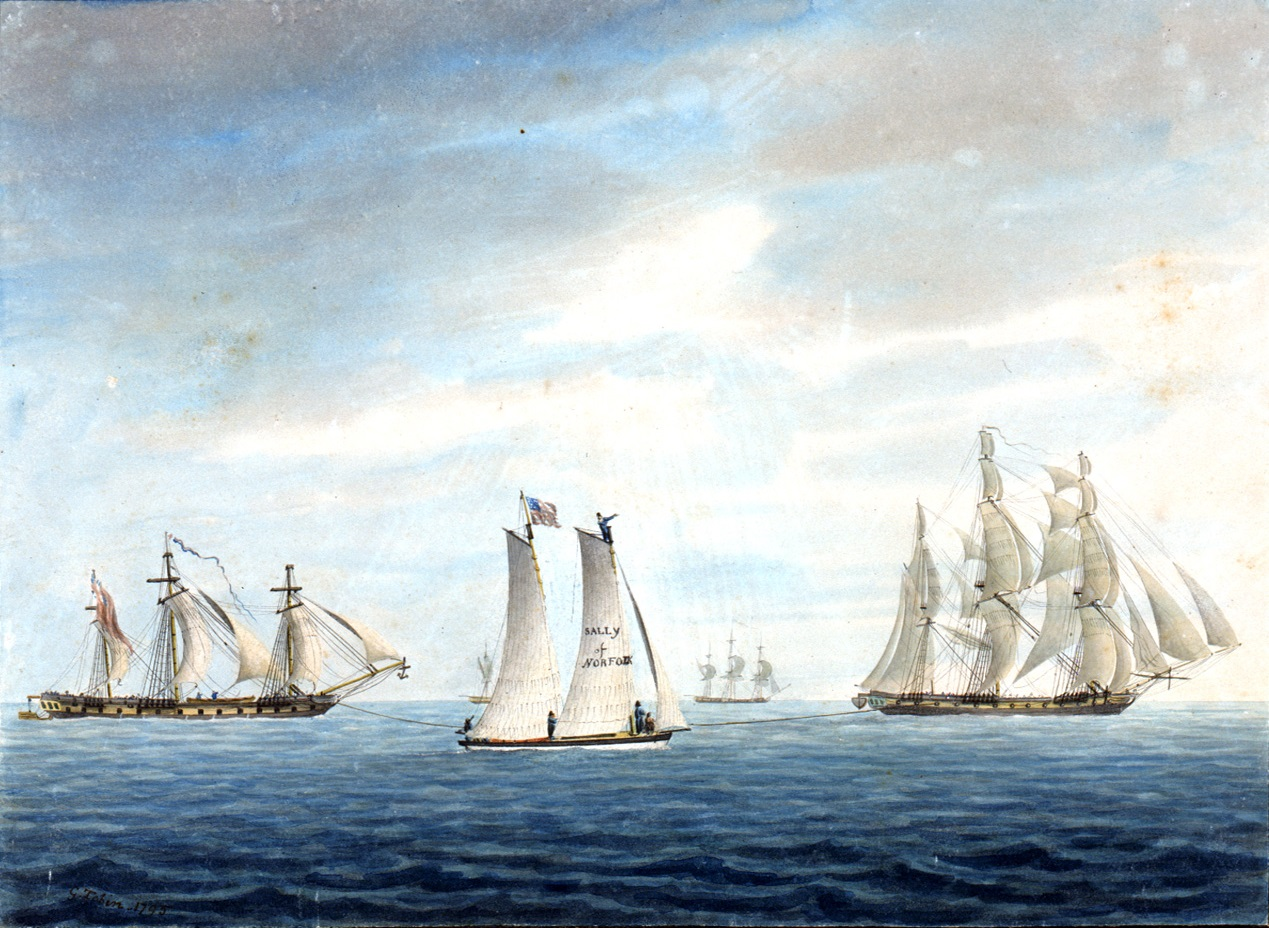
Cleopatra towing Thetis towards the Chesapeake, 31 December 1794

On 2 May 1795 Rear Admiral George Murray sent Captain Alexander Cochrane in Thetis, together with HMS Hussar, to intercept three French supply ships reported at Hampton Roads. At daybreak on 17 May the British came upon five ships 20 leagues (97 km) west by south from Cape Henry. The French made a line of battle to receive the British frigates. An action commenced, with three of the French vessels eventually striking their colours. Thetis took possession of the largest, which turned out to be Prévoyante, pierced for 36 guns but only mounting 24. Hussar captured a second, Raison, pierced for 24 guns but only mounting 18. One of the vessels that had struck nonetheless sailed off. Two of the five had broken off the fight and sailed off earlier. (The three that escaped were the Normand, Trajan, and Hernoux.) An hour after she had struck, Prévoyante's main and foremasts fell over the side. In the battle, Thetis had lost eight men killed and 9 wounded; Hussar had only two men wounded.

Four of the French ships had escaped from Guadeloupe on 25 April. They had sailed to American ports to gather provisions and naval stores to bring back to France.

Cochrane had intended to leave the prizes in charge of the cutter Prince Edward after repairing the damage to his vessel during the night. However, a breeze picked up and by morning the escaping French vessels were out of sight. The British sailed with their prizes to Halifax. The British took Prévoyante into the Royal Navy as HMS Prevoyante.

On 20 July, Thetis was in company with Hussar and HMS Esperance when they intercepted the American vessel Cincinnatus, of Wilmington, sailing from Ireland to Wilmington. They pressed many men on board, narrowly exempting the Irish revolutionary Wolfe Tone, who was going to Philadelphia.

In 1797 Thetis recaptured Indian Trader as Indian Trader was sailing from Cayenne to Baltimore. Thetis sent her into Halifax, Nova Scotia.

In 1801 Thetis took part in Lord Keith's expedition to Egypt. Because Thetis served in the navy's Egyptian campaign (8 March to 2 September 1801), her officers and crew qualified for the clasp "Egypt" to the Naval General Service Medal that the Admiralty authorised in 1850 to all surviving claimants. (Note: A first-class share of the prize money awarded in April 1823 was worth £34 2s 4d; a fifth-class share, that of a seaman, was worth 3s 11½d. The amount was small as 79 vessels and the entire army contingent shared in the prize money.)

=== Napoleonic Wars ===
In 1809 boats from Thetis and several other vessels cut out the French 16-gun brig Nisus at Deshaies, Guadeloupe. Captain George Miller sent in boats with the marines from Pultusk, Achates and Bacchus, and 78 sailors. The landing party first captured the fort at Deshaies, whereupon Nisus surrendered when its guns were turned on her. During the operation, Attentive kept up a six-hour cannonade on Nisus and the battery. Many of the 300 men in the battery fled, as did most of the crew of Nisus before the British could take possession. The British destroyed the battery before withdrawing. British casualties amounted to two men from Thetis being wounded on shore, and two men being wounded on Attentive. (Note: Prize money for the ordnance captured was paid in 1814. A first-class share was worth £20 19s 3½d; a sixth-class share, that of an ordinary seaman, was worth 6s 6½d.) The Royal Navy took Nisus into service as HMS Guadaloupe.

Thetis then took part in the storming of the batteries at Anse la Barque.

Thetis also participated in the capture of Guadeloupe in January and February 1810. (Note: A first-class share of the prize money for Guadaloupe was worth £113 9s 1¼d; a sixth-class share, that of an ordinary seaman, was worth £1 9s 5½d.) In 1847 the Admiralty awarded the Naval General Service Medal with clasp "Guadaloupe" to all surviving participants of the campaign.

== Fate ==
Thetis was sold in 1814.
