= Nicolas Touffet =

French naval officer

Nicolas Touffet was a French naval officer.

== Career ==
On 27 December 1808, Lieutenant Touffet took command of the brig Milan in Guyanne. On 30 October 1809, as she was tasked with ferrying food and materiel to Guadeloupe, Milan encountered the British frigates HMS Surveillante and Seine; trapped in a heavy sea, Touffet struck without a fight.

In 1811, Touffet had command of the brig Hussard, with the rank of Lieutenant, in the Escaut squadron under Vice-Admiral Burgues-Missiessy

In January 1812, Touffet has been promoted to Commander and was captaining the frigate Jahde in Rotterdam.

In 1814, Touffet took command of the corvette Egérie, bringing her from Dunkirk to Toulon, by way of Brest, from 20 May to 26 November. From there, he cruised off Golfe-Juan, and ferried dispatches and troops between Toulon, Bastia, Ajaccio, Calvi and Toulon. He also ferried Consul Dubois-Thainville from Toulon to Algiers and Tunis. On 17 June 1815, he battled the British brig HMS Pilot. (Note: English sources often misread the name Egérie as Légère.)

From July to September 1820, Touffet carried out missions off Senegal on the fluyt Golo, notably ferrying Captain Le Coupé, governor of Senegal from Brest to Saint-Louis. In March 1821, Golo ferried dispatches and materiel from Brest to Fort-Royal de la Martinique, and to Pointe-à-Pitre. She returned to Ile d'Aix with passengers. In August 1821, Golo sailed from Toulon to Smyrne before returning to Toulon.

In 1822, Touffet was promoted to Captain; in December, he took command of Jean Bart. In November 1823, Jean Bart ferried sailors, soldiers and artillery equipment from Toulon to Brest. From July 1823 to January 1824, Jean Bart transported funds from Brest to Fort-Royal de la Martinique; on 23 February 1823, she captured the Spanish privateer Nueva Veloz Mariane, off Azores.

In 1824, Touffet sailed Jean Bart from Brest to Rio de Janeiro, arriving in June. He returned to Brest commanding of the frigate Astrée, ferrying dispatches from August to September.

== Notes, citations, and references ==
Notes

Citations

References

- "Fonds Marine. Campagnes (opérations; divisions et stations navales; missions diverses). Inventaire de la sous-série Marine BB4. Tome deuxième : BB4 1 à 482 (1790-1826)" (PDF). www.servicehistorique.sga.defense.gouv.fr. Service historique du Ministère de la Défense. Archived from the original (PDF) on 29 September 2015.
- Roche, Jean-Michel (2005). Dictionnaire des bâtiments de la flotte de guerre française de Colbert à nos jours. Vol. 1. Group Retozel-Maury Millau. ISBN 978-2-9525917-0-6. OCLC 165892922. (1671-1870)
- Troude, Onésime-Joachim (1867). Batailles navales de la France (in French). Vol. 4. Challamel ainé.
