= HMS Prevost (1803) =

Naval 12-gun schooner (1803–1806)

History

United Kingdom
- Name: HMS Prevost
- Acquired: 1803 by purchase
- Captured: August 1806

General characteristics
- Type: Schooner
- Tons burthen: 145 tons (bm)
- Armament: 10 or 12 guns

HMS Prevost was a 12-gun schooner of unknown origin that the Royal Navy purchased in 1803. In 1806 the French privateer Austerlitz captured her.

== Career ==
Prevost was commissioned in the Leeward Islands in October 1803. In 1805 she was under the command of Lieutenant McLean until Lieutenant Noel Swiney replaced him. However, he died that same year at Barbados.

In 1806 Lieutenant Samuel Stout took command of Prevost.

In July and early August 1806, Prevost was part of a squadron that included Attentive and Express, and that was under the command of Commander Donald Campbell (acting), in Lilly. Together, they supported General Francisco de Miranda, aboard his ship Leander, in his quixotic and unsuccessful attempt to liberate the Captaincy General of Venezuela from Spain.

== Capture ==
Prevost was returning from the coast of South America with dispatches when she encountered heavy weather that lasted four days. To stay afloat she threw four of her guns overboard; her rigging was also badly damaged.

At daylight on 31 August 1806, she was about 50 miles from Martinique when she sighted a brig, a schooner, and in time, a sloop. The three commenced to pursue Prevost, finally catching up with her at about noon. Stout realized that he could not escape and so prepared to fight. The engagement began at 1:30pm and lasted about an hour before Stout was forced to strike. Prevost had lost three men killed and seven wounded, and the brig that captured Prevost was the 18-gun privateer Austerlitz. She took Prevost into Guadeloupe.
