= French brig Nisus (1805) =

Nisus
History

France
- Name: Nisus
- Ordered: 21 February 1804
- Builder: Lerond Campion & Co., Granville
- Laid down: 31 March 1804
- Launched: 15 February 1805
- Captured: 12 December 1809

United Kingdom
- Name: Guadaloupe
- Acquired: 12 December 1809 by capture
- Honours and awards: Naval General Service Medal with clasp "Guadaloupe"
- Fate: Sold 1814

General characteristics
- Type: Palinure-class
- Tons burthen: 335 14/94 (bm)
- Length: 98 ft 8 5/8 in (30.1 m) (overall); 78 ft 3 1/2 in (23.9 m) (keel)
- Beam: 28 ft 4 3/4 in (8.7 m)
- Depth of hold: 13 ft 10 in (4.2 m)
- Sail plan: Brig
- Complement: French service:94; British service:100
- Armament: French service: 16 × 6- or 8-pounder guns (initially); British service: 14 × 24-pounder carronades + 2 × 6-pounder chase guns

The French brig Nisus was a Palinure-class brig of the French Navy, launched in 1805. The Royal Navy captured Nisus at Guadeloupe in 1809. The British took her into service as HMS Guadaloupe (or Guadeloupe), and sold her in November 1814.

== French service ==
Nisus, under the command of lieutenant de vaisseau Le Nétrel, sailed from Granville, Manche, to Saint-Servan. Then on 11 April 1806 she sailed from saint-Malo to Brest. From 18 July 1808 she carried provisions, munitions, and stores from Brest to Basse-Terre, and then returned to Brest. By this time Le Nétrel had been promoted to the rank of capitaine de frégate. Still under his command, between 24 February and December 1809 she first sailed from Brest to Lorient. There she picked up troops and provisions for Guadeloupe before sailing there.

Nisus left Lorient on 30 October and arrived at Deshaies on 1 December. She was about to leave with a cargo of coffee when a British squadron under Captain George Miller in Thetis arrived on 12 December to reconnoiter the harbour.

== Capture ==
Miller sent in boats with the marines from Thetis, Pultusk, Achates, and Bacchus, and 78 sailors. The landing party first captured the fort at Deshaies, whereupon Nisus surrendered when its guns were turned on her. During the operation, Attentive kept up a six-hour cannonade on Nisus and the battery. Many of the 300 men in the battery fled, as did most of the crew of Nisus before the British could take possession. The British destroyed the battery before withdrawing. British casualties amounted to two men from Thetis being wounded on shore, and two men being wounded on Attentive.

== British service ==
The British took Nisus into service as HMS Guadaloupe and commissioned her at Antigua under Commander Michael Head.

Guadaloupe immediately participated in the capture of Guadeloupe in January and February 1810. (Note: A first-class share of the prize money for Guadaloupe was worth £113 3s 1¼d; a sixth-class share, that of an ordinary seaman, was worth £1 9s 1¼d.) In 1847 the Admiralty awarded the Naval General Service Medal with clasp "Guadaloupe" to all surviving participants of the campaign.

Head then sailed Gaudaloupe to Deptford where she underwent fitting-out from 23 August to 23 January 1811. In December 1810 Commander Joseph Swabey Tetley, late of Derwent, took command; he later sailed to the Mediterranean.

On 27 June 1811 Guadaloupe was off the Cap de Creux when she sighted two strange vessels to leeward, one a brig of 16 guns and the other a xebec of ten guns. An action ensued during which the French brig attempted to board Guadaloupe. Eventually the two French vessels retreated some two miles to the protection of two shore batteries at Port-Vendres. The French brig turned out to be Tactique, of sixteen 24-pounder carronades and 150 men; the xebec was Guêpe, of two long 8-pounder guns and six small carronades, and some 70 men. French losses were reported to have been 11 men killed and 48 wounded. Casualties aboard Guadaloupe consisted of one man killed, ten severely wounded, and two or three slightly wounded. (Note: Tactique was a Révolutionnaire-class corvette launched in 1793 as Tigre and renamed to Tactique in 1795. She had been rearmed in 1806 with eighteen 24-pounder carronades and two 6-pounder guns. She was broken up in 1815. Tactique had been on the Catalonia station under the command of capitaine de frégate Hurtel. There is no record of French naval xebec named Guêpe. Furthermore, the mention of Tactique and the engagement in the Fonds Marine also makes no mention of Guêpe. This, and her large crew, suggests she may have been a privateer operating in concert with the French Navy.)

On 24 October 1811, Guadaloupe encountered the French privateer schooner Syrene. After a 13-hour chase, Guadaloupe captured Syrene off Cape Blanco. She was pierced for 12 guns but carried only six. She had a crew of 61 men and was eight days out of Leghorn, but had made no captures. (Note: Marshall states that Tetley had taken temporary command of HMS Perlen and that it was she that captured Syrene. However, the letter in the London Gazette was signed by Tetley, aboard Guadaloupe.)

In 1812 Commander Arthur Stow (or Stowe), promoted from lieutenant, replaced Tetley. On 9 November 1813 Undaunted and Guadaloupe attacked Port-la-Nouvelle, with the marines storming the batteries while men from the ships captured two vessels and destroyed five. Captain Thomas Ussher of Undaunted noted in his report that this brought the total number of vessels taken or destroyed in the 10 months he had been in command of Undaunted up to seventy.

Commander Charles Hole replaced Stow.

In April 1814, Lieutenant Charles Pengelly, who was First-Lieutenant of Guadeloupe, was made acting commander of her for leading the Sicilian flotilla that participated in the capture of Genoa on 18 April. He was confirmed in the rank in September. Reportedly, Hole transferred to Pelorus. The same account stated that Lieutenant Pengelly had transferred from "the gun-boat service in the Faro" to Guadaloupe.

He returned Guadaloupe to Britain where she was paid-off in August 1814.

== Fate ==
The Principal Officers and Commissioners of His Majesty's Navy offered the "Guadaloupe sloop, of 325 tons" lying at Plymouth for sale on 3 November 1815. She sold on that day for £930.
