= HMS Hussar (1784) =

Enterprise-class Royal Navy frigate

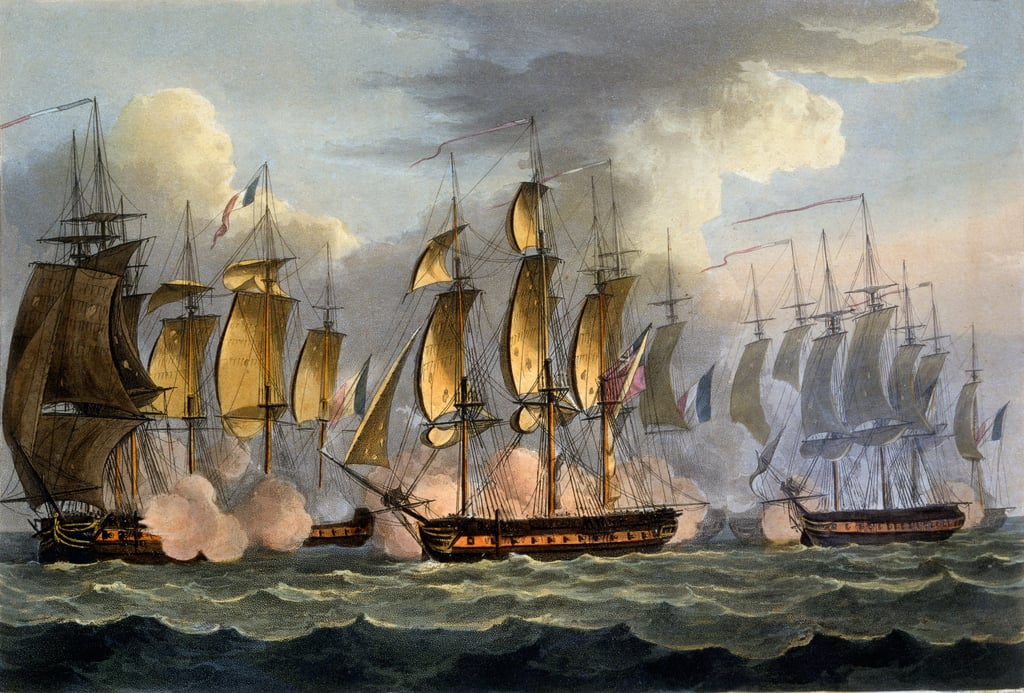
- Capture of La Prevoyante and La Raison by Thetis and Hussar, by Thomas Whitcombe

History

Great Britain
- Name: HMS Hussar
- Ordered: 26 March 1782
- Builder: Fabian, Clayton & Willson, Sandgate
- Laid down: June 1782
- Launched: 1 September 1784
- Completed: 7 April 1785
- Commissioned: May 1790
- Fate: Wrecked off Brittany 27 December 1796

General characteristics
- Class & type: 28-gun Enterprise-class sixth-rate frigate
- Tons burthen: 59679/94 (bm)
- Length: 120 ft 6 in (36.7 m) (overall); 99 ft 0 in (30.2 m) (keel)
- Beam: 33 ft 8 in (10.3 m)
- Depth of hold: 11 ft 0 in (3.4 m)
- Sail plan: Full-rigged ship
- Complement: 200 officers and men
- Armament: Upper deck: 24 × 9-pounder guns; QD: 4 × 6-pounder guns + 4 × 18-pounder carronades; Fc: 2 × 18-pounder carronades; 12 × swivel guns

HMS Hussar was a 28-gun Enterprise-class sixth-rate frigate of the Royal Navy. Hussar was first commissioned in May 1790 under the command of Captain Eliab Harvey.

== Career ==
From 1792-1794, Captain Sir Rupert George used the Hussar as his flagship when he was the commodore of the North America Station.

On 2 May 1795 Rear Admiral George Murray sent Captain Alexander Cochrane in Thetis, together with Hussar, to intercept three French supply ships reported at Hampton Roads. At daybreak on 17 May the British came upon five ships 20 leagues (97 km) west by south from Cape Henry. The French made a line of battle to receive the British frigates. An action commenced, with three of the French vessels eventually striking their colours. Thetis took possession of the largest, which turned out to be Prévoyante, pierced for 36 guns but only mounting 24. Hussar captured a second, Raison, pierced for 24 guns but only mounting 18. One of the vessels that had struck nonetheless sailed off. Two of the five had broken off the fight and sailed off earlier. (The three that escaped were Normand, Trajan, and Hernoux.) An hour after she had struck, Prévoyante's main and foremasts fell over the side. In the battle, Thetis had lost eight men killed and 9 wounded; Hussar had only two men wounded.

Four of the French ships had escaped from Guadeloupe on 25 April. They had sailed to American ports to gather provisions and naval stores to bring back to France.

Cochrane had intended to leave the prizes in charge of the cutter Prince Edward after repairing the damage to his vessel during the night. However, a breeze picked up and by morning the escaping French vessels were out of sight. The British sailed with their prizes to Halifax. The British took Prévoyante into the Royal Navy as HMS Prevoyante.

On 20 July, Hussar was in company with Thetis and HMS Esperance when they intercepted the American vessel Cincinnatus, of Wilmington, sailing from Ireland to Wilmington. They pressed many men on board, narrowly exempting the Irish revolutionary Wolfe Tone, who was going to Philadelphia.
