= French brig Voltigeur (1804) =

Voltigeur
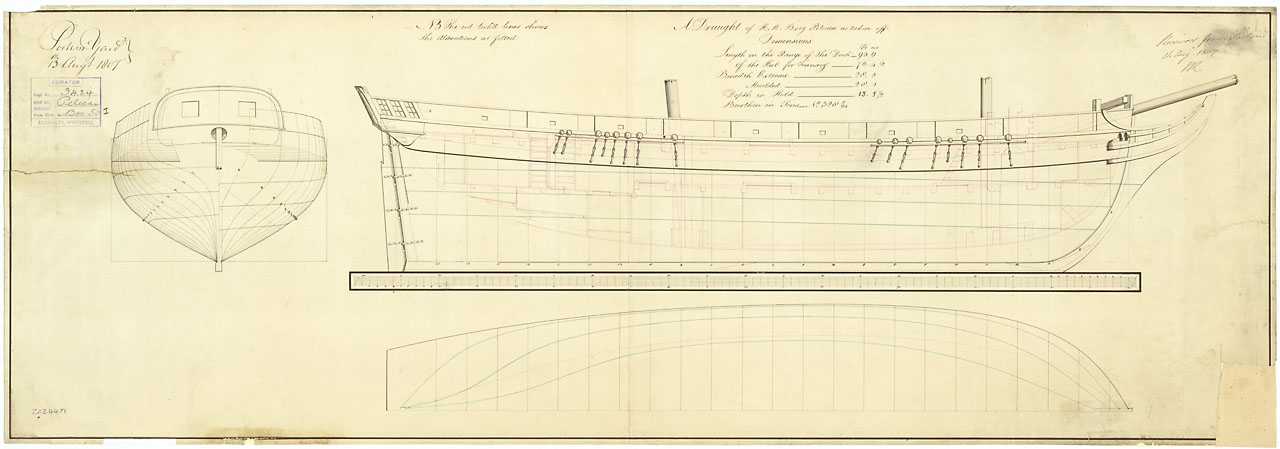
- Pelican (captured 1806)

History

France
- Name: Voltigeur
- Ordered: 18 April 1804 (contract)
- Builder: Danet (Antwerp)
- Laid down: June 1803
- Launched: 7 September 1804
- Completed: 24 September 1804
- Captured: 26 March 1806

United Kingdom
- Name: HMS Pelican
- Acquired: 26 March 1806 by capture
- Fate: Sold 16 April 1812

General characteristics
- Class & type: Palinure-class brig
- Displacement: 280 tons (French)
- Tons burthen: 3284/94 (bm)
- Length: 95 ft 9 in (29.2 m) (overall); 76 ft 4 1/2 in (23.3 m) (keel)
- Beam: 28 ft 5 in (8.7 m)
- Depth of hold: 8 ft 1 1/2 in (2.5 m)
- Sail plan: Brig
- Complement: French service:120; British service:121
- Armament: French service: 16 × 6-pounder guns; Later: 14 × 24-pounder carronades + 2 × bow chasers (6 or 8-pounder); British service: 14 × 32-pounder carronades + 2 × 6-pounder [bow chasers

The French brig Voltigeur was a Palinure-class brig launched in 1804. The British captured her in 1806 and renamed her HMS Pelican. She was sold in 1812.

== Capture ==
In late 1805, the sister ships Phaeton and Voltigeur, both armed with 16 guns and having crews of 120 men and 115 men, were under the command of Lieutenants de vaisseau Louis-Henri Saulces de Freycinet and Jacques Saint-Cricq. They cruised the coasts of Schleswig-Holstein before they set sail for Santo Domingo. On 24 March, a little south-east of Puerto Rico, they encountered Reindeer and exchanged fire for about four hours before nightfall ended the encounter. During that engagement the French vessels had suffered damage and possibly casualties. They then sailed towards Curacoa. )

Two days later, on 27 March 1806, Pique, under the command of Captain Charles B.H. Ross, was sailing from Santo Domingo to Curacoa when she encountered two French navy brigs. At 1pm, Pique began firing at long range, and by 2pm had caught up with them. After an intensive cannonade that lasted some 20 minutes, Pique was able to send a boarding party aboard one of the two French vessels. A terrible struggle ensued before the French vessel struck. The French crew had concealed themselves under sails and in the wreckage, emerging once the boarding party arrived and subjecting it to a devastating fusillade that killed or wounded most of the boarding party. Ross then sent over more men, before returning to the chase of the second brig. After the exchange of several more broadsides, the second French vessel struck. The two French brigs were Phaeton and Voltigeur.

Pique had one man wounded during the chase, and nine men killed and 13 wounded during the boarding of Phaeton. Ross estimated that the French vessels had lost half their crews dead and wounded. Later reports suggested that although French casualties on Phaeton had been heavy, those on Voltigeur were slight.

The British took Phaeton into service as Mignonne, and Voltigeur as Pelican. (Note: Some subsequent reports state that Phaeton became Mignonne, which is correct, and that Voltigeur became Musette, which is incorrect.) In 1847 the Admiralty awarded the Naval General Service Medal with clasp "Pique 26 March 1806" to all surviving claimants from the action.

== British service ==
The British commissioned Pelican under Commander William Ward. She then sailed to Portsmouth.

Pelican participated in the capture of Copenhagen. (Note: An able seaman received £3 8s 0d in prize money.) Before the battle, on 19 August, Pelican captured the Danish merchant vessel Christian Tonder. Then after the battle, on 10 September, Pelican was in company with Defence and Comus at the capture of the Danish merchant vessel Fredeus Forsward. Pelican and Comus were together on 29 September, with Defence in sight, at the capture of the Danish merchant vessel Elizabeth Vonder Pahlen. The same three British warships were together on 2 October at the capture of the Danish vessel Anna Catharina. Lastly, on 4 November Pelican captured the Danish brig Charlotta Amelia.

On 26 October 1807, Tsar Alexander I of Russia declared war on Great Britain. The official news did not arrive there until 2 December, at which time the British declared an embargo on all Russian vessels in British ports. Pelican was one of some 70 vessels that shared in the seizure of the 44-gun Russian frigate Speshnoy (Speshnyy), then in Portsmouth harbour. The British seized the Russian storeship Wilhelmina (Vilghemina) at the same time. The Russian vessels were carrying the payroll for Vice-Admiral Dmitry Senyavin’s squadron in the Mediterranean. (Note: An able seaman on any one of the 70 British vessels received 14s 7½d in prize money.) Between 20 March and 13 June 1807 Pelican was in Portsmouth, undergoing refitting.

Pelican then returned to the West Indies where on 29 March 1808 Cerberus, in company with Lilly, Pelican, Express, Swinger and Mosambique, sailed from Marie-Galante to attack the island of La Désirade. They arrived on 30 March and sent in a landing party of seamen and marines from the vessels of the squadron, all under the overall command of Captain Sherriff of Lily. As the boats approached they exchanged fire with a battery of 9-pounder guns covering the entrance to the harbour. The ships' guns silenced the battery and the French surrendered.

In June 1808 Commander Isaac Morrison replaced Ward. In December Commander Edward A’Court replaced Morrison. On 9 December 1809, Redpole was some nine leagues from Beachy Head when she sighted two luggers. She gave chase and after a fight captured one. While this was going on Pelican came on the scene and chased the second lugger, but without success. The captured lugger was the Grand Rodeur, four days out of Dieppe. She was armed with 16 guns and had a crew of 80.

In 1809 Pelican was in the western hemisphere, where she detained the President, Burgeis, master, which was sailing from Boston to Cuba.

== Fate ==
Pelican was paid off in 1810. She was put up for sale on 27 November 1811, and sold at Deptford on 16 March 1812.
