= Prévoyante =

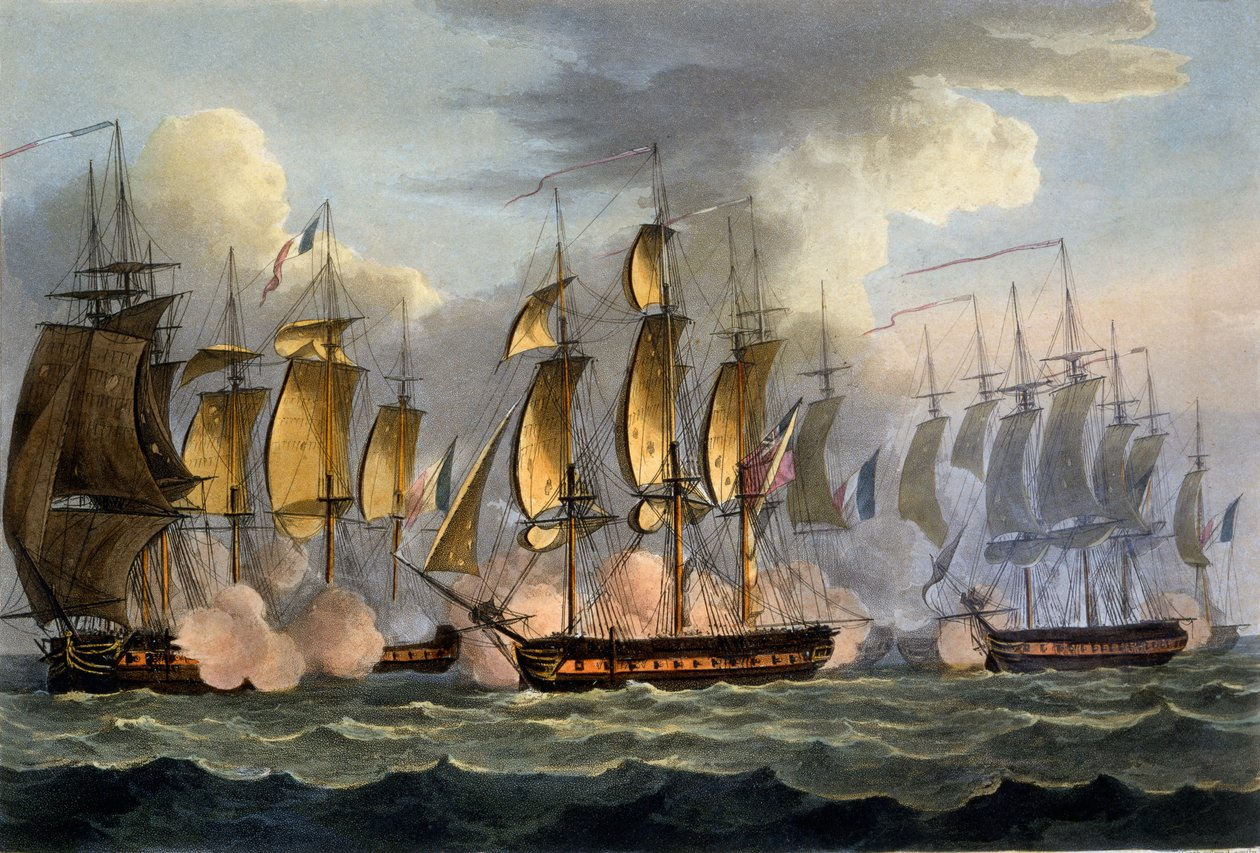
- Capture of La Prevoyante and La Raison by Thetis and Hussar, by Thomas Whitcombe

History

France
- Name: Prévoyante
- Namesake: Far-sighted
- Laid down: 1791
- Launched: May 1793
- Captured: May 1795

Great Britain
- Name: HMS Prevoyante
- Acquired: May 1795 by capture
- Fate: Sold for breaking up in July 1819

General characteristics
- Tons burthen: 80415/94 (bm)
- Length: 143 ft 0 in (43.6 m) (overall);121 ft 110 1/2 in (39.7 m) (keel)
- Beam: 35 ft 2 1/2 in (10.7 m)
- Depth of hold: 13 ft 40 in (5.0 m)
- Propulsion: Sails
- Complement: French store ship: 100-200; British frigate: 284; British storeship:90
- Armament: French store ship; Lower gundeck:Pierced for ten but unarmed; Upper gundeck (UD):24 × 8-pounder guns; British frigate; UD: 30 × 12-pounder guns; QD:4 × 9-pounder guns + 8 × 18-pounder carronades; Fc:2 × 9-pounder guns + 2 × 18-pounder carronades; British storeship:14 × 6-pounder guns (UD) + 4 × pounder guns (QD)

Prévoyante was the second of two flûtes (supply or store ships) built to a design by Raymond-Antoine Haran. She was launched in May 1793 at Bayonne. (Note: Her sister ship and the name ship of the class was Nourrice, which the British destroyed in 1811.) The British frigates HMS Thetis and HMS Hussar captured Prévoyante in 1795 and the British took her into the Royal Navy after first converting her to a fifth rate. She served as a frigate until 1800, when she underwent reconversion back to a store ship. As a store ship she sailed to the Mediterranean, Cape of Good Hope, and Quebec. She was sold for breaking up in July 1819.

== French career and capture ==
In late 1794, Admiral Jervis signed a safe-conduct pass for Prevoyante so that she could repatriate British prisoners of war.

On 2 May 1795 Rear Admiral George Murray sent Captain Alexander Cochrane in Thetis, together with Hussar, to intercept three French supply ships reported at Hampton Roads. At daybreak on 17 May the British came upon five ships 20 leagues West by South from Cape Henry. The French made a line of battle to receive the British frigates. An action commenced, with three of the French vessels eventually striking their colours. Thetis took possession of the largest, which turned out to be Prévoyante, pierced for 36 guns but only mounting 24. Hussar captured a second, Raison, pierced for 24 guns but only mounting 18. One of the vessels that had struck nonetheless sailed off. Two of the five had broken off the fight and sailed off earlier. (The three that escaped were Normand, Trajan, and Hernoux.) An hour after she had struck, Prévoyante's main and foremast fell over the side. In the battle, Thetis had lost eight men killed and nine wounded; Hussar had only two men wounded.

Four of the French ships had escaped from Guadeloupe on 25 April. They had sailed to American ports to gather provisions and naval stores to bring back to France.

Cochrane had intended to leave the prizes in charge of the cutter Prince Edward after repairing the damage to his vessel during the night. However, a breeze picked up and by morning the escaping French vessels were out of sight. The British sailed with their prizes to Halifax.

== British frigate ==
Admiral Murray commissioned Prevoyante under Captain John Poo Beresford, who had been captain of Hussar. He proceeded to pay for some of her fitting out from his own pocket. They also took Raison into service. While on the Halifax station, Hussar, Captain Charles Wemyss, and Prevoyante captured the ship Minerva on 10 May 1796. Six or so months after Beresford had assumed command, the Admiralty appointed him to Raison and Charles Wemyss to Prevoyante. Then Beresford apparently returned to command of Prevoyante as he was in command when Prevoyante captured the ship Argus on 7 August 1797.

In October 1797 Wemyss replaced Beresford on Prevoyante, On 9 November 1798 Prevoyante captured the brig Norge.

In January 1799, Captain J. Seater replaced Wemyss. On 16 May, Prevoyante captured the schooner Caroline.

Prevoyante was among the many British vessels that shared in the proceeds of the capture of the French frigate Désirée, which HMS Dart, under Patrick Campbell, captured on 8 July 1800 in the Raid on Dunkirk.

Prevoyante was serving on the North Sea station when she shared in the seizure of the 40-gun Danish frigate Freya on 25 July 1800 off Ostend. The seizure of the Freya for opposing the British right of search led to strained relations with Denmark. The British government had to dispatch Lord Charles Whitworth to Copenhagen, with a substantial Royal Navy escort, to convince the Danes to drop the matter. This incident and another in Malta ultimately led in the next year to the British capturing Copenhagen. At the capitulation the British again captured Freya, which they then added to the Royal Navy as Freya.

== British store ship ==
On 10 September 1800 Prevoyante arrived as Sheerness. Between October and May 1801 she was at Sheerness and Deptford fitting out as a store ship.

In 1803 she was at Woolwich under the command of Mr. William Brown, Master. On 25 April she arrived at Plymouth with a cargo of hemp and iron intended for the dockyards. She had left Malta about a month earlier. On the leg from Gibraltar, Prevoyante was in company with Dragon and Alligator when they sighted two French ships of the line off Cape St. Vincent. The French ships veered off rather than engage the British vessels.

On 10 December 1804, Prevoyante was under the command of Mr. Daniel M'Coy when she was in company with Defence when Defence captured the Spanish vessel "Detipente". Defence, Prevoyante, and Guerrier shared in the capture of the Spanish ship Diligente on 30 December.

Prevoyante shared with Merlin and Eurydice in the proceeds from the capture on 11 June 1805 of the Prussian ship Edward. The proceeds were forwarded from Gibraltar.

Prevoyante, still under Mr. M'Coy's command, sailed for the Cape of Good Hope on 30 August 1806. She then sailed for the Mediterranean on 28 June 1807.

She underwent repair between May 1811 and May 1812. In 1813 her master was Mr. Stephen Trounce. His replacement, in September 1814, was Mr. Thomas Stokes.

On 15 January 1815 HMS Cherub and HMS Racoon left Rio de Janeiro, escorting a convoy that included the storeships Prevoyante and Serapis, and seven merchantmen. They left Pernambuco on 6 March.

In 1817 she was at Quebec.

== Fate ==
Prevoyante was offered for sale at Chatham on 22 July 1819. She was sold that day to Beech & Co. for £3,000 for breaking up.
