= French brig Phaeton (1804) =

Phaeton
History

France
- Name: Phaeton
- Ordered: 18 April 1803 (contract)
- Builder: Danet, Antwerp
- Laid down: July 1803
- Launched: 28 June 1804
- Captured: 26 March 1806

United Kingdom
- Name: Mignonne
- Acquired: 26 March 1806 by capture
- Renamed: HMS Musette 7 October 1807
- Fate: Sold 1814

General characteristics
- Class & type: Palinure-class
- Type: Brig
- Displacement: 290 tons
- Tons burthen: 328 79/94 (bm)
- Length: 97 ft 0 in (29.6 m) (overall); 77 ft 0 in (23.5 m) (keel)
- Beam: 28 ft 4 in (8.6 m)
- Depth of hold: 7 ft 0 in (2.1 m)
- Propulsion: Sails
- Sail plan: Brig
- Complement: French service:120; British service:121
- Armament: French service: 16 × 6-pounder guns; Later: 14 × 24-pounder carronades + 2 × 6- or 8-pounder guns; British service: 14 × 32-pounder carronades + 2 × 6-pounder guns

The French brig Phaeton was a Palinure-class brig launched in 1804. The British captured her in 1806 and renamed her HMS Mignonne. In 1807 they renamed her HMS Musette. She was sold in 1814.

== French career ==
Phaéton was stationed at Hellevoetsluis under the command of lieutenant de vaisseau Saulces de Freycinet. Between 7 September and 16 October 1805, she conducted a patrol in the North Sea. Shortly thereafter the French Navy dispatched her to the Antilles on a mission.

On 25 March 1806, off Puerto Rico, Phaéton and her sister-ship Voltigeur encountered HMS Reindeer. Both sides exchanged fire for some four hours. During that engagement the French brigs suffered damage and possibly casualties; Reindeer too had some damage but no casualties.

== Capture ==
The next day, on 26 March, Pique, under the command of Captain Charles B.H. Ross, was sailing from Santo Domingo to Curacoa when she encountered two French navy brigs. At 1pm, Pique began firing at long range, and by 2pm had caught up with them. After an intensive cannonade that lasted some 20 minutes, Pique was able to send a boarding aboard one of the two French vessels. A terrible struggle ensued before the French vessel struck. The French crew had concealed themselves under sails and in the wreckage, emerging once the boarding party arrived and subjecting it to a devastating fusillade that killed or wounded most of the boarding party. Ross then sent over more men, before returning to the chase of the second brig. After the exchange of several more broadsides, the second French vessel struck.

The two vessels turned out to be Phaéton and Voltigeur, having crews of 120 men and 115 men. Voltigeur was under the command of lieutenant de vaisseau M. St. Craig. Pique had one man wounded during the chase, and nine men killed and 13 wounded during the boarding of Phaéton. Ross estimated that the French vessels had lost half their crews dead and wounded. Later reports suggested that although French casualties on Phaeton had been heavy, those on Voltigeur were slight.

The British took Phaéton into service as Mignonne, and Voltigeur as Pelican. (Note: Some subsequent reports state that Phaeton became Mignonne, which is correct, and that Voltigeur became Musette, which is incorrect.)

== British service ==
The British commissioned Mignonne under Commander Robert Nicholson. In August Commander George Gustavus Lennox replaced Nicholas.

The Admiralty then renamed her HMS Musette and in October 1807 Commander Peter Douglas took command.

In 1808 Commander Henry Boys replaced Douglas. In 1809 Commander J. Lloyd assumed command. In December Commander Thomas P.J. Parry replaced Lloyd. He sailed her to Britain and she arrived at Portsmouth on 30 June 1810. There she was placed in ordinary.

== Fate ==
The Admiralty offered Musette for sale at Portsmouth on 9 June 1814. She was finally sold on 1 September 1814 for £400.
