= French brig Oreste (1805) =

French naval brig 1805–1810 and UK naval brig 1810–1812

Oreste
History

France
- Name: Oreste
- Namesake: Orestes
- Builder: Le Havre
- Laid down: July 1804
- Launched: 16 January 1805
- Captured: 12 January 1810

United Kingdom
- Name: Wellington
- Acquired: 12 January 1810 by capture
- Fate: Broken up 1812

General characteristics
- Displacement: 352 tons
- Tons burthen: 31236/94
- Length: 27.61 m (90.6 ft) (overall); 25.66 m (84.2 ft)
- Beam: 8.45 m (27.7 ft)
- Draught: 3.55 m (11.6 ft) (unloaded)
- Depth of hold: 4.22 m (13.8 ft)
- Sail plan: Brig
- Complement: French Navy: 94; RN:100
- Armament: 1805: 12 × 6-pounder guns + 4 × 32-pounder carronades; 1807:14 × 24-pounder carronades + 2 × 8-pounder chase guns; Royal Navy:14 × 24-pounder carronades + 2 × 6-pounder chase guns

Oreste was a 16-gun brig, the name ship of her class. She had been built to a design by Notaire Granville and was launched at Le Havre in 1805. The British captured her in 1810, renamed her HMS Wellington, but never commissioned her. She was broken up in 1812.

== Career ==
In 1808 Oreste was under the command of capitaine de frégate Thierria-La Maisonblanche. She carried dispatches from Bayonne to Cayenne, cruised off Guyana, returned to Bayonne from Martinique, sailing via Pasajes, carried provisions from Bayonne to Martinique, and returned to Pasajes. There on 1 October 1808 lieutenant de vaisseau Jean-Baptiste-Anselme Mousnier took command of Oreste.

Between 15 January and 12 November 1809, Oreste sailed her from Bayonne to Bilbao. She was stationed there but then sailed to Bordeaux via La Teste. At Bordeaux Mousnier received the mission of transporting troops, provisions, and supplies to Guadeloupe. In October, Oreste captured the British merchant vessel Saint Andrew. On 18 November 1809 Oreste sailed her from Bordeaux for Guadeloupe.

She left Guadeloupe on 11 January 1810 for France. Her passengers included a lieutenant-colonel and two other army officers and the captains and other officers from two French frigates that the British had recently destroyed.

== Capture ==
In late 1809, HMS Scorpion, under the command of Commander Francis Stanfell, formed part of the squadron off Guadeloupe under Captain Volant Vashon Ballard of Blonde. On 11 January 1810, Ballard detached Stanfell to attempt to cut out a French brig anchored near the shore. At about 9pm, Scorpion spotted Oreste clearing the north point of the bay. Stanfell set off in pursuit. During the chase Scorpion's crew had to use her sweeps before she could close with Oreste at about 11:30pm. The action lasted for two to two-and-a-half hours, with Scorpion also being exposed to fire from the shore. Oreste made every effort to escape or run on shore, but Stanfell's skillful sailing frustrated these efforts. Oreste, which had been dismasted, finally struck her colours at 1:30am on 12 January. At this point a barge from Blonde arrived and assisted in the capture.

Scorpion had four men wounded during the action; the French losses were two killed and ten wounded, including Mousnier.Oreste carried a crew of 110; the British captured 91 officers and men. The remaining survivors escaped to shore on one of the brig's boats. In 1847 the Admiralty issued the Naval General Service Medal with clasp "Scorpion 12 Jany. 1810" to the survivors of the action.

== Fate ==
Oreste was a relatively new vessel so the Royal Navy took her into service. As the Royal Navy already had an Orestes, the Navy named her HMS Wellington. However, the Navy never commissioned Wellington, and she was broken up at Portsmouth in September 1812.
