= French brig Milan (1807) =

French brig, later a Royal Navy brig

Milan
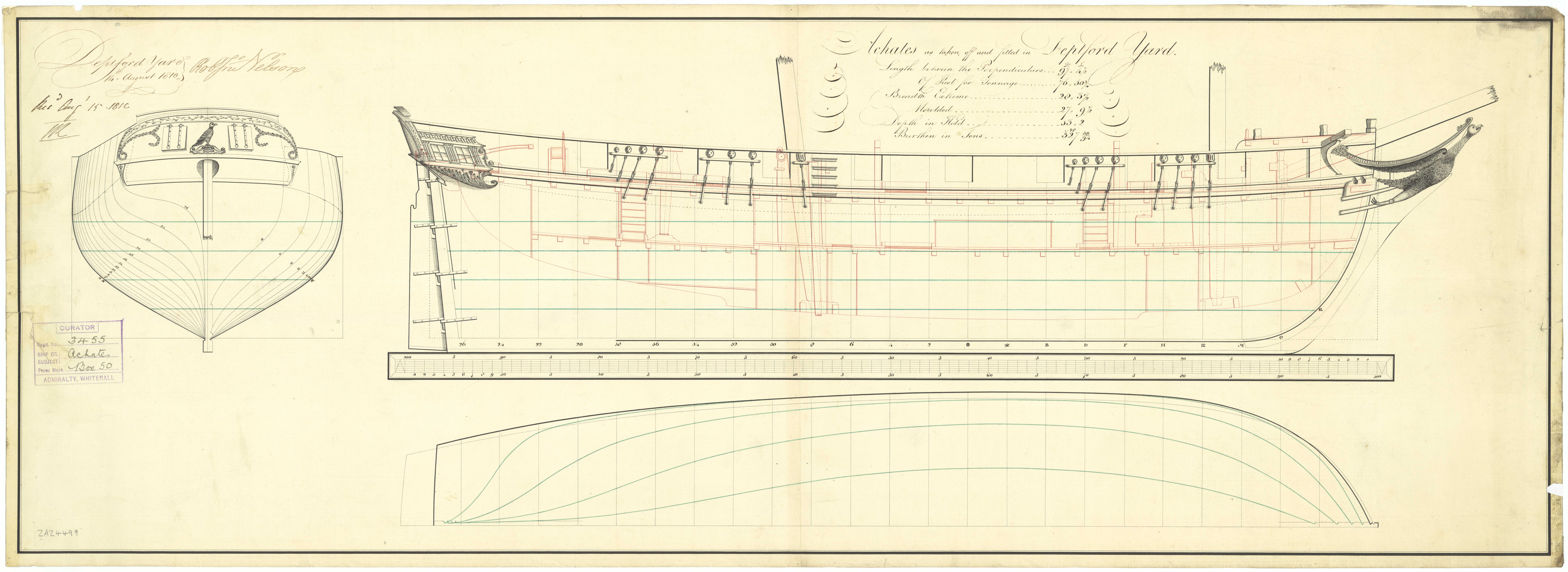
- Plan of Achates, 1809

History

France
- Name: Milan
- Namesake: Kite
- Ordered: 28 December 1805
- Builder: Enterprise Ethéart, Saint Malo
- Laid down: March 1806
- Launched: 6 July 1807
- Captured: 30 October 1809

United Kingdom
- Name: HMS Achates
- Acquired: 30 October 1809
- Commissioned: May 1810
- Fate: Sold 1818

General characteristics
- Type: Brig
- Displacement: 327 tons
- Tons burthen: 32739/94
- Length: Overall:97 ft 4 1/2 in (29.7 m); Keel:76 ft 10 3/4 in (23.4 m)
- Beam: 28 ft 3 1/2 in (8.6 m)
- Draught: 13 ft 2 in (4.0 m)
- Sail plan: Brig
- Complement: British service: 95
- Armament: French service: 14 × 24-pounder carronades + 2 × 8-pounder chase guns; British service: 14 × 24-pounder carronades + 2 × 6-pounder chase guns

Milan was a French brig built at Saint Malo, from plans designed by François Pestel that had already served for Curieux in 1800 and for Palinure in 1804. She served in the French Navy for four years before HMS Surveillante and Seine captured her. She became HMS Achates in the Royal Navy and served until after the end of the Napoleonic Wars.

== French career ==
Lieutenant-Commander Jacques de Saint-Cricq commissioned Milan on 20 January 1808 at Saint Servan. She departed Saint Malo on 6 March 1808 with 67 men of the 86th Line Infantry Regiment, bound for Cayenne. On 11 March she captured the British merchantman Neptune, near Cape Ortegal, and scuttled her by fire. She arrived at Cayenne on 12 April, and then proceeded to cruise in the area.

On 3 July Milan had an inconclusive encounter with a British frigate, before the two ships disengaged. (Note: Roche states that the British frigate fled. Given the relative strengths of the ships, this is difficult to believe, unless the frigate was in distress.) Milan returned to Paimboeuf, and then was stationed at Nantes. Saint-Cricq was promoted to Commander on 12 July 1808, but kept command of Milan until 30 April 1809, where he transferred to French frigate Clorinde (1808) in Nantes.

On 10 September 1808, Milan departed Cayenne, bound for Saint Nazaire, where she arrived on 18 October, before undergoing repairs at Paimboeuf.

On 29 October 1808, Milan, under Lieutenant Nicolas Touffet, departed Mindin with 31 soldiers of the 26th Line Infantry Regiment to be ferried to Gouadeloupe. However, off Ile de Ré, she encountered the British frigates HMS Surveillante and Seine; trapped in a heavy sea, Touffet struck without a fight.

== British career ==
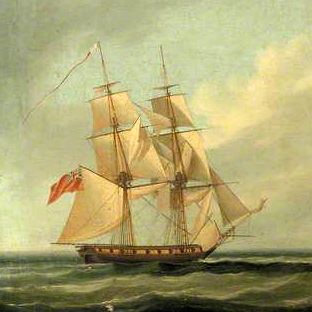
Curieux (here in British service), sister-ship of Milan

Brought into Royal Service as HMS Achates, HMS Achates having been lost in early 1810. Commander John Davies commissioned her in May 1810 for the Channel.

In February 1811 Achates detained Anna, Holk, master, and sent her into Plymouth. Anna had been sailing from Bilbao.

Achates captured the American brig Mary Ann, Irving, master, from Bayonne, on 29 December 1811. She arrived at Plymouth on 4 January 1812.

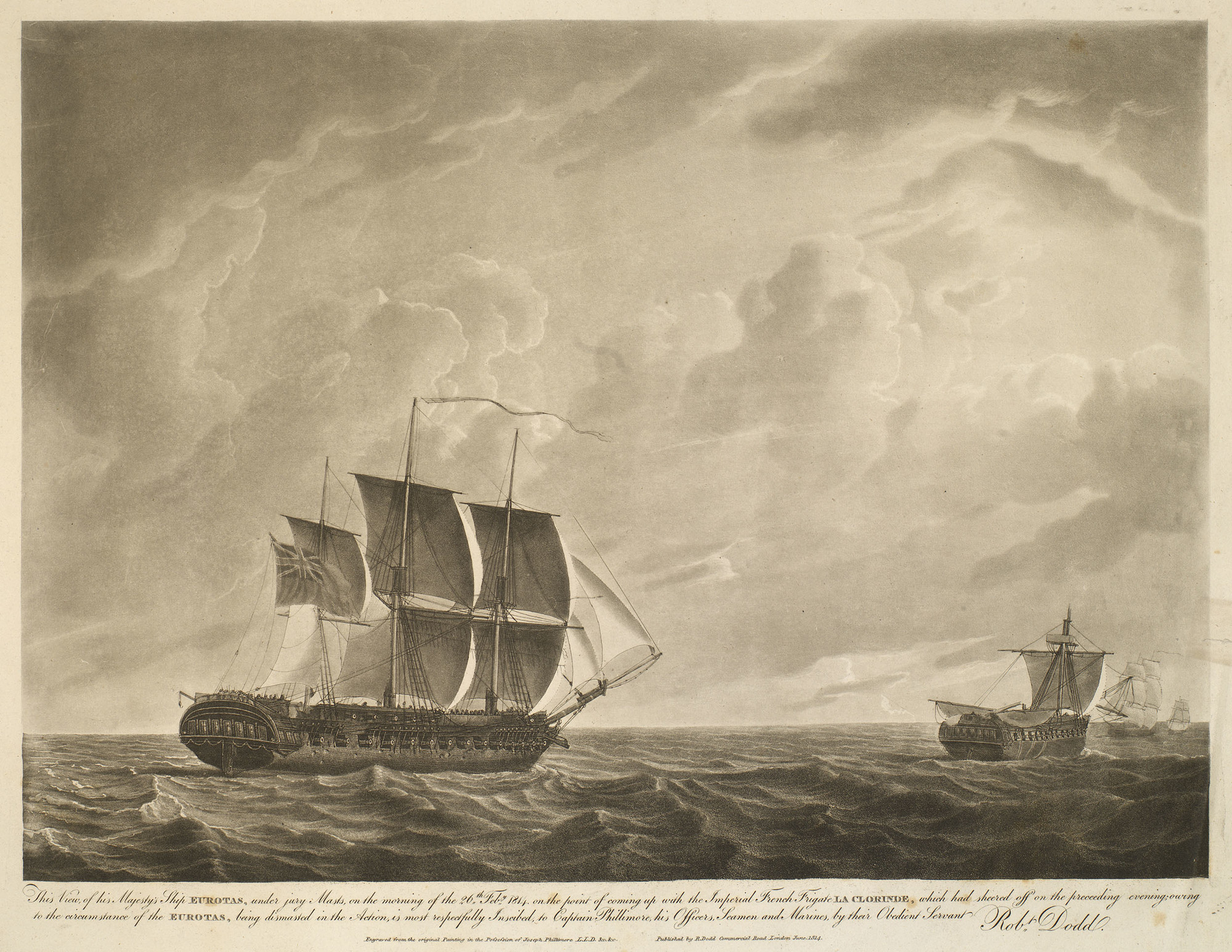
Capture of La Clorinde, by Robert Dodd, 1 March 1817, Achates far left in the picture

Achates shared with Dryad in the proceeds of the capture of Don Roderick on 16 February. Achates had been in company with Belle Poule, Dryad, and Lyra. Don Rodrgo, Gillies, master, arrived at Plymouth on 20 February.

Achates was among the 25 Royal Navy ships that shared in the proceeds of the detention of Asia on 5 August 1812. (Note: A first-class share of the prize money was worth £85 17s 6½d; a sixth-class share, that of an ordinary seaman, was worth 2s 6d.)

On 29 January 1813 Achates captured the American ship Orbit, of 390 tons (bm), six guns, and 25 men. Orbit was sailing from New York to Bordeaux with a cargo of cotton, pearl, and potash. then on 24 February Achates captured the brig Spitfire, of 270 tons (bm), four guns, and 21 men. Spitfire was sailing from Boston to France with a cargo of cotton and tobacco. Achates's captain at the time of these captures was Commander John Codd.

In May 1813 Commander Isaac Morrison assumed command.

The Portuguese ship Oceano (or Oceana, Martin, master), came into Plymouth on 16 June 1813. She had been sailing from Bombay to Lisbon via Pernambuco with a valuable cargo when the French privateer Lion captured her. Achates recaptured her. Oceano was last from Pernambuco, where she discharged part of her cargo, and took on board sugar and coffee for Lisbon. The Frenchmen plundered her of 40,000 dollars.

On 21 October 1813 Achates encountered the damaged French frigate Trave and the two exchanged fire that wounded two men aboard Trave. However, Trave was able to extricate herself from the engagement. Still, On 23 October, HMS Andromache captured Trave. Achates was not in sight and so did not share in the prize money for the capture.

Achates recaptured Amity on 23 December. Amity, Greenlaw, master, had been sailing from Newfoundland to Belfast when an American privateer had captured her.

Achates was in sight when on 26 January 1814 HMS Castilian recaptured Apparencen and her cargo.

Achates was returning from Newfoundland in company with the frigate Dryad when on 26 February they encountered the damaged French frigate Clorinde, which had attempted to escape Eurotas after a hard-fought battle the previous day.

At the approach of Dryad and Achates, Clorinde fired a single cannon shot pro forma and surrendered to Dryad, which towed her into Portsmouth. (Note: Prize money was paid in January 1815, with the value of a first-class share being £671 0s 6d; the value of a sixth-class share was £7 9s 5¼d. A first-class share of the head money was worth £182 12s 9¼d; a sixth-class share was worth £1 1s 2¼d.)

On 26 February 1814 Achates picked up at sea the derelict vessel Dolphin, for which Achates received salvage money. This may have been the vessel that Achates had taken into Falmouth on 7 April. She had encountered the vessel about 12 leagues northwest of the Lizard. The vessel was a brig of 140 tons (bm), with a billet head and yellow sides, apparently American-built and about two years old. Only the lower part of her masts were still standing, her hatches were gone, and she was full of water. She had been carrying fruit, but her cargo was gone too.

In August Achates detained and sent into plymouth Conde de Sabajol, Vindal, master. She had been sailing from Gothenburg to Rio de Janeiro.

On 14 September an American privateer chased Lowjee Family off the Isles of Scilly as Lowjee Family was coming from Bombary. Achates and Wanderer hove into sight and went after the privateer.

Achates returned to Plymouth on 21 September from having sailed to assist the disabled ships of a convoy from Jamaica.

Commander Thomas Lamb Polden Laugharne replaced Morrison in June. He then cruised the Channel. Achates was laid up in November 1815.

== Fate ==
The "Principal Officers and Commissioners of His Majesty's Navy" offered "Achates brig, of 327 tons" for sale at Plymouth on 11 June 1818. John Small Sedger purchased Achates for £1,100.

== Legacy ==
The plans of Milan, reconstituted by the British after her capture, are published in Lyon, quoted by Demerliac.
