= Layman (surname) =

Layman is a surname, and may refer to:

- Alfred Layman (1858–1940), English cricketer
- Charles Layman (1865–1926), Australian politician
- George Layman (1838–1922), Australian legislator
- Florence Layman (1873-1930), American inventor
- Isaac Layman (born 1977), American photographer
- Jason Layman (born 1973), American football player
- John Layman (born 1969), American comic book writer
- Jake Layman (born 1994), American basketball player
- Sandy Layman, American politician
- William Layman, HMS Raven (1804) commander
- A Layman, pen-name by Thomas Hughes and Sir Walter Scott
- Layman Brothers
- Layman Pang (740–808), celebrated lay Buddhist

== See also ==
- Laymon
- Lejman
