= Carronade =

Smooth-bore, short-barrel naval cannon

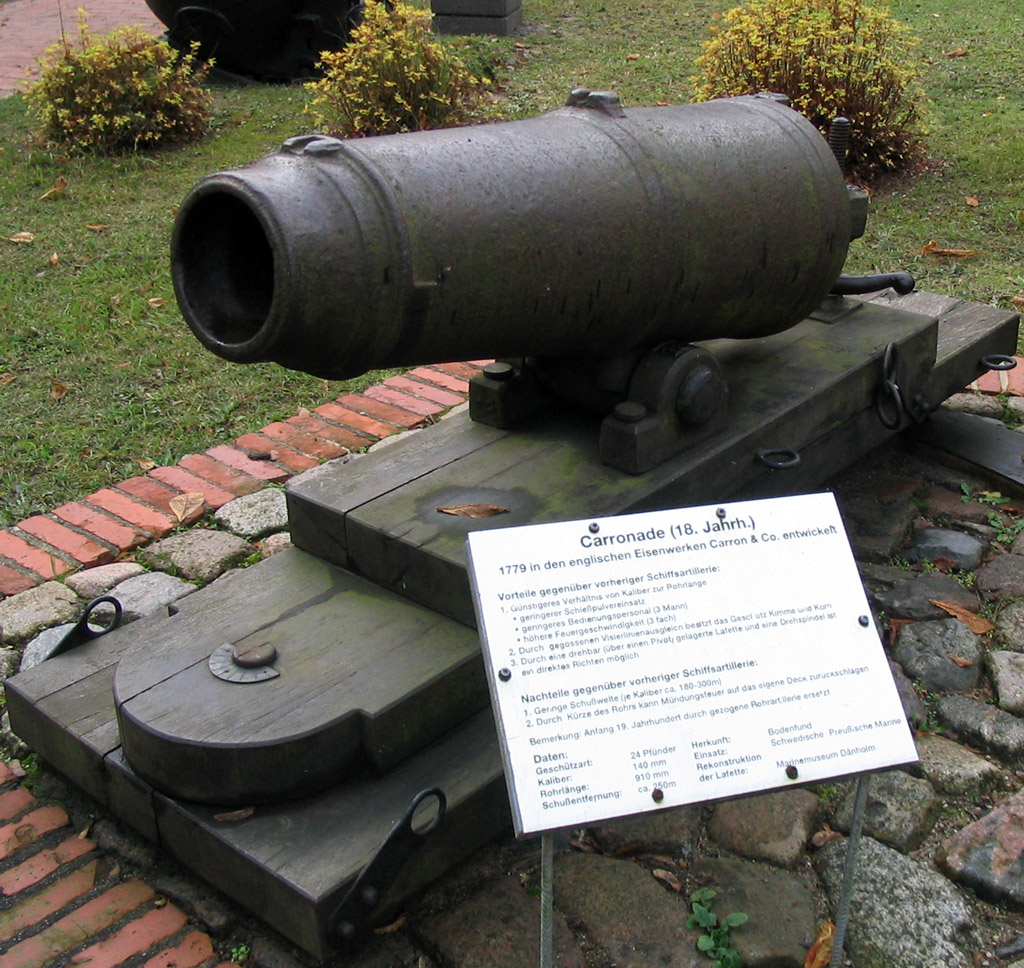
- Type: Naval gun
- Place of origin: United Kingdom

Service history
- In service: 1778–1881
- Used by: British Empire; France; Greece; Spain; Denmark-Norway; Republic of Texas; Two Sicilies; Sardinia
- Wars: American Revolutionary War, French Revolutionary Wars, Napoleonic Wars, War of 1812, American Civil War, First Boer War

Production history
- Designer: Robert Melville
- Designed: 1778
- Manufacturer: Carron Company

Specifications
- Mass: 12–18 pounders

A carronade is a short, smoothbore, cast-iron naval cannon. It was first produced by the Carron Company, an ironworks in Falkirk, Scotland, and, all in all, counting all nations, was used from the last quarter of the 18th century to the mid-19th century. The first navy to use carronades was the Royal Navy. When this new weapon proved its efficiency, other navies such as those of France and Spain adopted it progressively in the late 18th Century and onwards.

The main function of the carronades was to serve as a powerful, short-range, anti-ship and anti-crew weapon. The technology behind the carronade was greater dimensional precision, with the shot fitting more closely in the barrel, thus transmitting more of the propellant charge's energy to the projectile, allowing a lighter gun using less gunpowder to be effective.

Carronades were initially found to be very successful, but they eventually disappeared as naval artillery advanced, with the introduction of rifling and consequent change in the shape of the projectile, exploding shells replacing solid shot, and naval engagements being fought at longer ranges.

== History ==
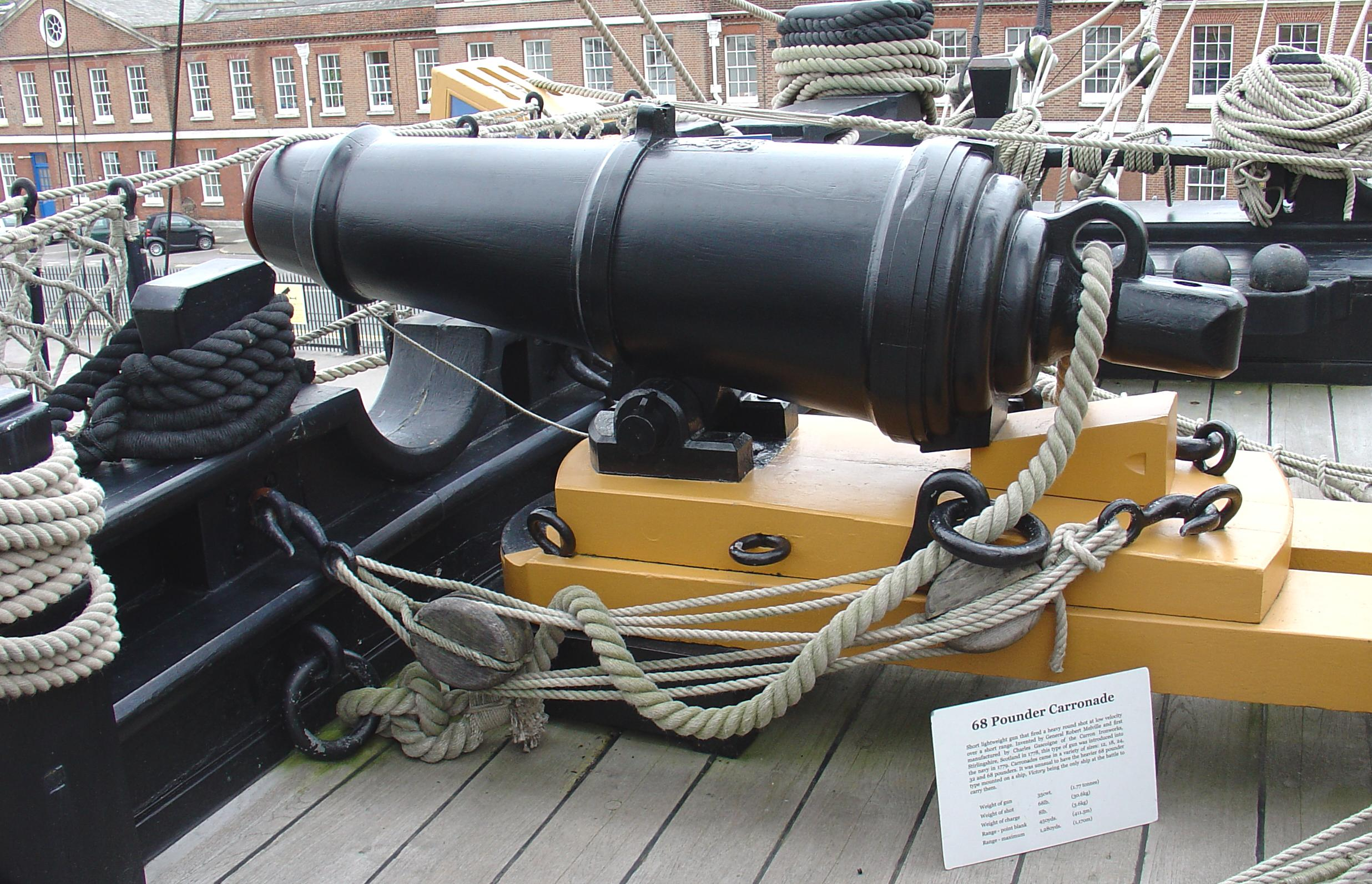
68-pounder British naval carronade, with slider carriage, on HMS Victory

The carronade was designed as a short-range naval weapon with a low muzzle velocity for merchant ships, but it also found a niche role on warships. It was produced by the Carron ironworks and was at first sold as a system with the gun, mounting, and shot all together. The standard package of shot per gun was 25 roundshot, 15 barshot, 15 double-headed shot, 10 "single" grapeshot, and 10 "single" canister shot. "Single" meant that the shot weighed the same as the roundshot, while some other canister and grapeshot were also included which weighed one and a half times the roundshot.

Its invention is variously ascribed to Lieutenant General Robert Melville in 1759, or to Charles Gascoigne, who was manager of the Carron Company from 1769 to 1779. In its early years, the weapon was sometimes called a "melvillade" or a "gasconade". The carronade can be seen as the culmination of a development of naval guns reducing the barrel length and gunpowder charge. The Carron Company was already selling a "new light-constructed" gun, two-thirds of the weight of the standard naval gun and charged with one sixth of the weight of ball in powder before it introduced the carronade, which further halved the gunpowder charge.

=== Theory of design ===
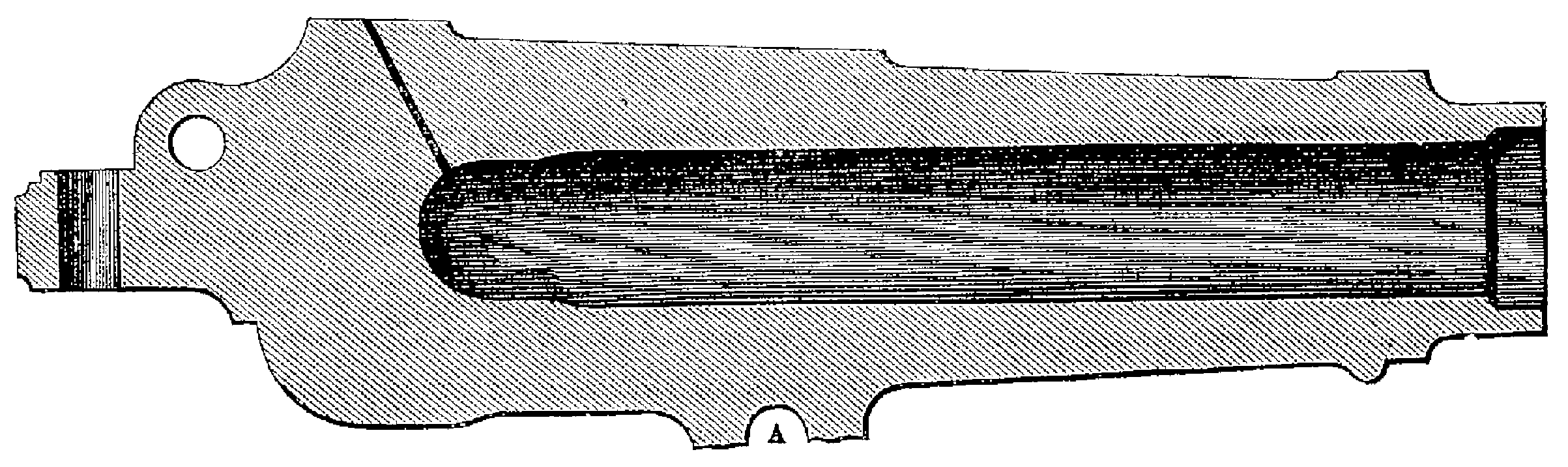
A cross-section diagram of a carronade, from a 1869 French book

The advantages for merchant ships are described in an advertising pamphlet of 1779. Production of both shot and gun by the same firm immediately allowed a reduction in the windage, the gap between the bore of the gun and the diameter of the ball. The smaller gunpowder charge reduced the barrel heating in action, and reduced the recoil. The mounting, attached to the side of the ship on a pivot, took the recoil on a slider, without altering the alignment of the gun. The pamphlet advocated the use of woollen cartridges, which eliminated the need for wadding and worming, although they were more expensive.

Simplifying gunnery for comparatively untrained merchant seamen in both aiming and reloading was part of the rationale for the gun. The replacement of trunnions by a bolt underneath, to connect the gun to the mounting, reduced the width of the carriage enhancing the wide angle of fire. A merchant ship would almost always be running away from an enemy, so a wide angle of fire was much more important than on a warship. A carronade weighed a quarter as much and used a quarter to a third of the gunpowder charge as a long gun firing the same cannonball.

The reduced charge allowed carronades to have a shorter length and much lighter weight than long guns. Increasing the size of the bore and ball reduces the required length of barrel. The force acting on the ball is proportional to the square of the diameter, while the mass of the ball rises by the cube, so acceleration is slower; thus, the barrel can be shorter and therefore lighter. Long guns were also much heavier than carronades because they were over-specified to be capable of being double-shotted, whereas it was dangerous to do this in a carronade. A ship could carry more carronades, or carronades of a larger caliber, than long guns, and carronades could be mounted on the upper decks, where heavy long guns could cause the ship to be top-heavy and unstable. Carronades also required a smaller gun crew, which was very important for merchant ships, and they were faster to reload.

=== Early use ===
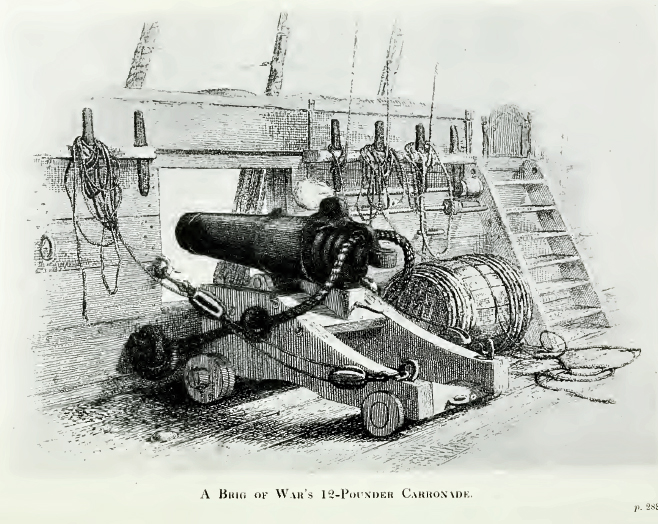

Carronades initially became popular on British merchant ships during the American Revolutionary War. A lightweight gun that needed only a small gun crew and was devastating at short range was well suited to defending merchant ships against French and American privateers. The French came in possession of their first carronades in December 1779 with the capture of the brig Finkastre by the frigate Précieuse, but the weapon was judged ineffective and was not adopted by them at the time. However, in the action of 4 September 1782, the impact of a single carronade broadside fired at close range by the frigate HMS Rainbow under Henry Trollope caused a wounded French captain to capitulate and surrender the Hébé after a short fight.

The Royal Navy was initially reluctant to adopt the guns, mainly due to mistrust of the Carron Company, which had developed a reputation for incompetence and commercial sharp dealing. Carronades were not even counted in numbering the guns of a ship. Lord Sandwich eventually started mounting them in place of the light guns on the forecastle and quarterdeck of ships. They soon proved their effectiveness in battle. French gun foundries were unable to produce equivalents for twenty years, so carronades gave British warships a significant tactical advantage during the latter part of the 18th century—though French ships mounted another type of weapon in the same role, the obusier de vaisseau. HMS Victory used the two 68-pounder carronades which she carried on her forecastle to great effect at the Battle of Trafalgar, clearing the gun deck of the Bucentaure by firing a round shot and a keg of 500 musket balls through the Bucentaure's stern windows.

The carronade was initially very successful and widely adopted, and a few experimental ships were fitted with a carronade-only armament, such as HMS Glatton and HMS Rainbow. Glatton, a fourth-rate ship with 56 guns, had a more destructive broadside at short range than HMS Victory, a first-rate ship with 100 guns. Glatton and Rainbow were both successful in battle, though the carronade's lack of range was a tactical disadvantage of this arrangement against an opponent who could keep out of carronade range, but within the range of their own long guns.

=== Decline ===
In the 1810s and 1820s, tactics started to place a greater emphasis on the accuracy of long-range gunfire, and less on the weight of a broadside. Captain David Porter of USS Essex complained when the navy replaced his 12-pounder long guns with 32-pounder carronades.

In the 1840s, the Royal Navy leased several carronade-armed clippers from Jardine, Matheson & Co. in 1840 to supplement the steamships it used against Qing dynasty China during the First Opium War.

The carronade was a popular armament among Anglo-American opium traffickers. Its light weight meant that opium traffickers could maintain both speed and asymmetrical force projection in Asia.

The carronade disappeared from the Royal Navy in the 1850s, after improved methods for building cannons had been developed by William George Armstrong and Joseph Whitworth. Carronades were nevertheless still used in the American Civil War in the 1860s. The last known use of a carronade in conflict was during the First Boer War. In the siege of Potchefstroom, the Boers used 'Ou Griet', an antique carronade mounted on a wagon axle, against the British fort.

== Design ==
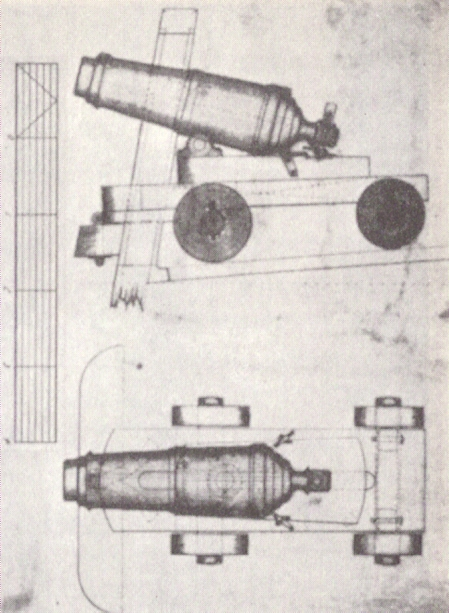
Admiralty carriage mount for an 18-pounder carronade, 1808

The original design of the carronade included a different type of mounting on a wooden carriage, where the cannon itself had a projecting loop on the bottom that was pinned to the gun carriage, which was fastened to the side of the ship, with a pivoting mounting which allowed the gun to be rotated, while rearward recoil was contained, sometimes with a slider carriage. In some versions, a wedge was placed underneath the chamber to control elevation, while in later versions an elevating screw was used.

Carronades had a chamber that was one-caliber smaller than the bore; for example, an 18-pounder carronade had its chamber bored equal to a 12-pounder. This reduced the weight of the cannon, but also had the effect of reducing the velocity of the cannonball, and hence range. A factor mitigating the deficiency in range was that carronades could be bored with a much tighter windage than long guns, so that more of the propellant went to moving the shot, rather than bypassing it.

Naval artillery during the Age of Sail simply was not accurate, regardless of whether the cannon was a gun or a carronade. Almost all barrels were smoothbore, not rifled, and tolerances had wide variations on everything from the actual roundness and straightness of the barrel to shot size in relation to the bore (windage). Sights were rudimentary or non-existent, and elevation was controlled by wedges and guesswork. As a result, effective or decisive naval battles were generally fought at ranges under 100 yd (91 m) where the carronade's heavier ball was useful and its shorter range was not a huge problem. Technological improvements changed the capabilities of naval armament by the nineteenth century, but muzzle-loading smoothbore cannon were still not very accurate. Consequently, naval tactics in line of battle counted on the effect of rapid broadsides at short range, to which the carronade could make a significant contribution. In smaller vessels such as frigates, privateers, and raiders, the captains still appreciated long guns for their increased range, since they were not expected to engage in fighting in line-of-battle, but rather often found themselves engaged in long chases or attempts to work to windward. It was often better tactically to attempt to shoot the opponent's rigging down at range rather than close in for direct combat, where the weaker hulls of lighter vessels were at risk. They also often found themselves far from home or harbors, where repairs and spare yards, masts or rigging could be found. Generally, although the power of the "smashers", as they were called, was acknowledged, most captains continued to prefer long guns.

== Ordnance ==
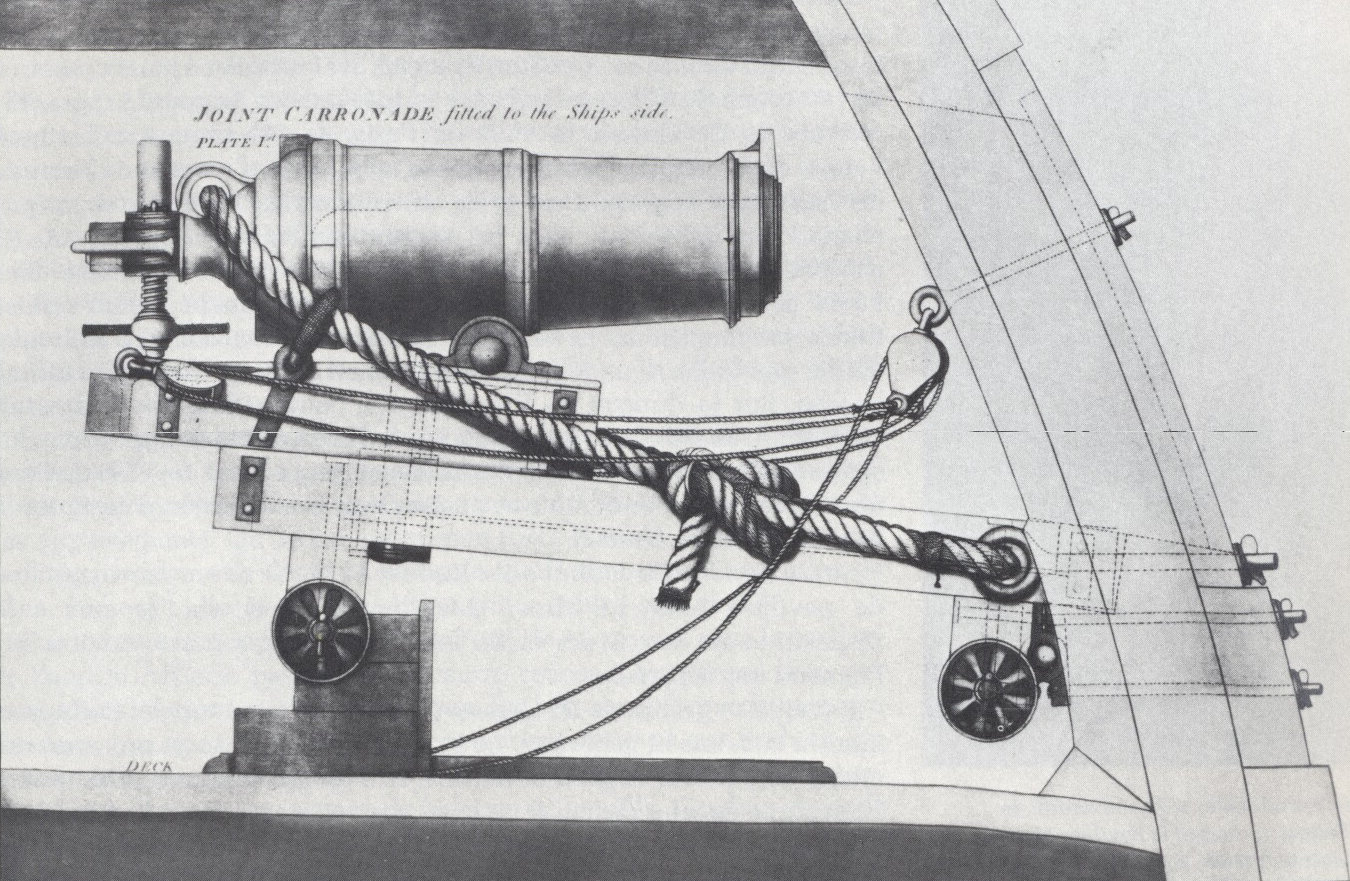
Diagram of a carronade mounting. The lack of a nozzle or muzzle cup suggests this carronade pre-dates ca. 1790, and it must date to 1785 or earlier as a copy of this drawing in the Dutch archives bears that date.

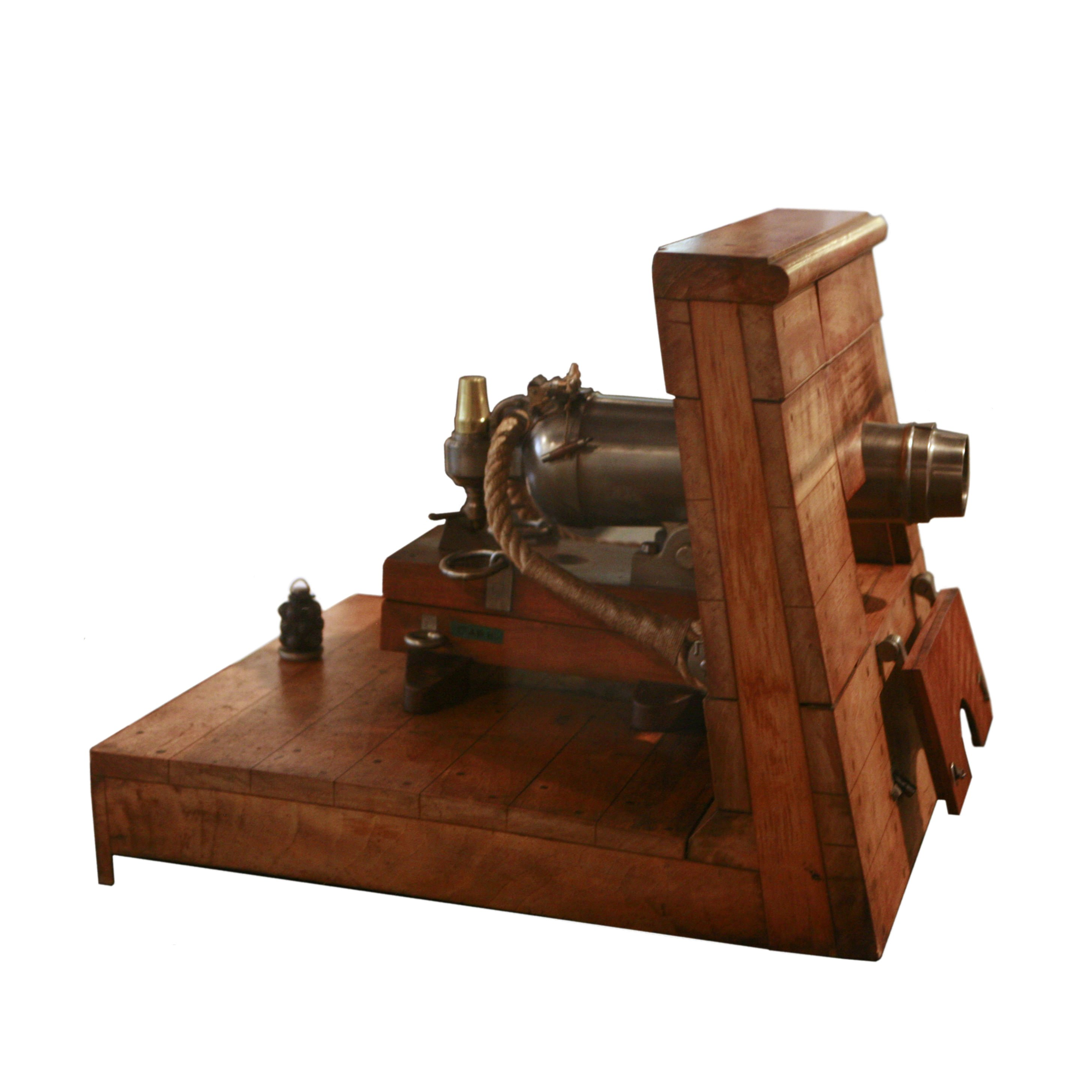
Model of a carronade with grapeshot ammunition

A carronade was much shorter and a third to a quarter of the weight of an equivalent long gun. A 32-pounder carronade, for example, weighed less than a ton, but a 32-pounder long gun weighed over 3 tons. Carronades were manufactured in the usual naval gun sizes: 6-, 12-, 18-, 24-, 32-, 42-, and 68-pounder versions are known.

The smaller carronades served in three roles. First, they often constituted the entire armament of unrated vessels. For instance, the Ballahoo- and Cuckoo-class schooners were armed only with four 12-pounder carronades. Second, gunboats such as those that the Americans deployed at the Battle of Lake Borgne often had one large 18-, 24-, or 32-pounder gun forward on a pivot, and two smaller carronades aft. Finally, larger vessels carried a few 12-, 18-, or 24-pounders to arm their ship's boats—cutters, pinnaces, launches, barges, and the like—to give them firepower for boat actions. For instance, each of the 42 larger British vessels at the Battle of Lake Borgne carried a carronade in its bow; only the three gigs were unarmed.

At the other end, even a quite small vessel might carry the 68-pounders. For instance, Commander William Layman of the Cruizer-class brig sloop HMS Raven replaced her two forward 6-pounder guns and 32-pounder carronades with a single 68-pounder on a pivot, and then did the same with two of the aft 32-pounder carronades. By doing this, he replaced 70 pounds of broadside with 136 pounds (assuming that both 68-pounders would usually fire on the same side), and ensured that Raven would have less dead-space to her front and rear.

Carronades were not counted in a ship of the line's rated number of guns. The classification of Royal Navy vessels in this period can therefore mislead; they would often be carrying fewer guns but more pieces of ordnance than they were described as carrying. The same applied to the French and American navies when they adopted the carronade.

The carronade, like other naval guns, was mounted with ropes to restrain the recoil, but the details of the gun mounting were usually quite different. The carronade was typically mounted on a sliding rather than a wheeled gun carriage, and elevation was achieved with a turnscrew, like field guns, rather than the quoins (wooden wedges) usual for naval guns. In addition, a carronade was usually mounted on a lug underneath the barrel, rather than the usual trunnions to either side. As a result, the carronade had an unusually high centre of gravity. Towards the end of the period of use, some carronades were fitted with trunnions to lower their centres of gravity, to create a variant known as the "gunnade". Gunnades, introduced around 1820, are distinct from the earliest carronades, which also featured trunnions.

In the late 18th century, a new type of cannon was developed in Britain which was a cross between a cannon and a carronade, called a "cannonade" (not to be confused with the term cannonade which refers to rapid and sustained artillery fire or the act of firing as such). An example was the "medium 18 pounder", which was shorter and lighter than a gun, yet longer than a carronade. While seemingly a good idea in theory, it was found that the gun was less accurate and shorter-ranged than a long cannon, less powerful than a carronade, and -at 28 cwt - too light for the powerful charge, meaning recoil was excessive and often broke the breachings or ropes which attached the gun to the hull timbers. They were quickly removed from service in most cases, although a number were retained on ships in merchant service, such as the East India Company, which were not generally expected to engage in combat. A number of the merchant ships in the Battle of Pulo Aura were armed with cannonades. This was a fight between a fleet of East India Company merchantmen under command of Commodore Nathaniel Dance and a French naval squadron under Admiral Linois; it was unusual for merchant ships to engage in combat, but they successfully beat off the French in a series of engagements, convincing them they were actually facing a powerful force of Royal Navy vessels; this action was later used as the basis for the climactic battle in the book H.M.S Surprise, part of the famous Aubrey and Maturin series by Patrick O'Brian.

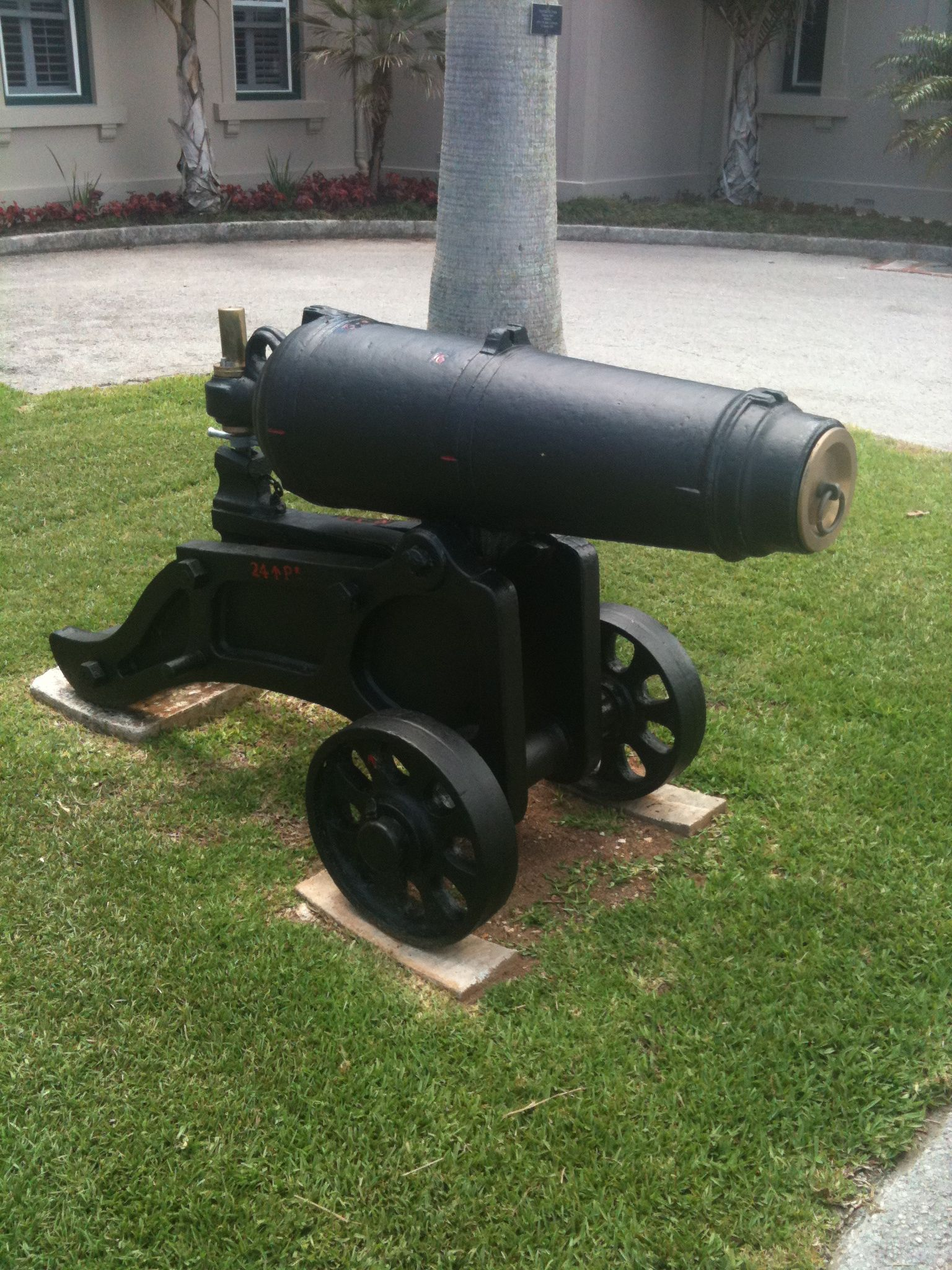
Carronade on a garrison mount, used to defend fortifications. Government House, Bermuda

The East India Company (EIC) also used carronades, and these appear to be larger, and heavier than those that Royal Navy used. In his discussion of the single-ship action in which the French frigate Piémontaise captured the East Indiaman Warren Hastings on 11 June 1805, the naval historian William James compared the 18-pounder carronades on Warren Hastings with the 18-pounder carronades that the British Royal Navy used. The EIC 18-pounder was 5 ft (1.5 m) long, and weighed 15.5 cwt; the Royal Navy's 18-pounder carronade was 3 ft 3 in (1.0 m) and weighed 10.5 cwt (1,176 lb (533.4 kg)). James's figures show the EIC's 12-pounder carronades were 3 ft 3 in (1.0 m) long, and weighed 8.5 cwt (952 lb (431.8 kg)); the Royal Navy's 12-pounder carronade was 2 ft 8 in (0.8 m) and weighed 6.5 cwt (728 lb (330.2 kg)).

== Range ==
There was usually a considerable gap (known as windage) between the ball and the inside of the gun barrel, as a result of irregularities in the size of cannonballs and the difficulty of boring out gun barrels. If the windage of a cannon was off as much as a quarter of an inch (.25 in (6.4 mm)), it could cause a considerable loss in power and accuracy. The manufacturing practices introduced by the Carron Company reduced the windage considerably. Despite the reduced windage, carronades had a much shorter range than the equivalent long gun, typically a third to a half, because they used a much smaller propellant charge (the chamber for the powder was smaller than the bore for the ball). Typical naval tactics in the late 18th century, however, emphasised short-range broadsides, so the range was not thought to be a problem.

The air resistance of a spherical cannonball in supersonic flight is much greater than in subsonic flight. For a given weight of powder, a larger ball, having a large mass, has a lower maximum velocity which reduces the range of supersonic flight. But the increase in the distance of subsonic flight may have more than compensated, as the air resistance is proportional to the square of the diameter but the mass is proportional to the cube. The Victory's 68 lb carronade is reported to have had a maximum range of 1,280 yd (1,170 m) at an angle of 5 degrees with a 5 lb charge of gunpowder. The structure of Victory's forecastle limited the weight of the guns. The other gun on the forecastle was a medium 12 lb cannon, which had a maximum range of 1,320 yd (1,210 m). Carronades were not noticeably short range for either the weight of the gun or the gunpowder charge. Carronades were short range because of their small gunpowder charge but their lower muzzle velocity required a higher trajectory. But at sea the range of the long gun had little use; guns were on moving platforms, making timing of fire very difficult. Pitch and roll meant that most ships fought at close range of a few hundred yards or less. In battles between warships, carronades could be at a disadvantage if they were fought outside their point blank range, such as in the case of USS Essex, a frigate equipped almost solely with carronades, which was reduced to a hulk by the longer-range guns of HMS Phoebe and HMS Cherub off Valparaiso, Chile, in the March 28, 1814 Battle of Valparaiso. Warships often aimed at the enemy's hull to destroy its capacity for battle. A ball fired from a cannon on the downward roll of the ship would often ricochet off the sea into the enemy hull. A merchant ship would more often aim at the bigger target of the masts and rigging in the hope of escaping a pursuing enemy. The higher trajectory required of carronades at ranges of 400 yd (370 m) or more was little disadvantage for their use by merchant ships or any naval ship fleeing a more powerful enemy. The theory for centuries had always associated long barrels with long range, but experience had also shown that shortening the barrel did not reduce performance as much as expected (e.g., the English musket barrel between 1630 and 1660 went down from 4–3 ft (1.22–0.91 m) in length.).

== Diagram ==
1. Breech bolt; 2. Aft sight; 3. Vent hole; 4. Dispart sight; 5. First reinforcing ring; 6. Barrel; 7. Muzzle; 8. Second reinforcing ring; 9. Azimutal pivot; 10. Chock; 11. Elevation pivot; 12. Wheel; 13. Mobile pedestal; 14. Carriage; 15. Pommel; 16. Elevation thread
