= Corkscrew =

Kitchen tool for opening wine bottles

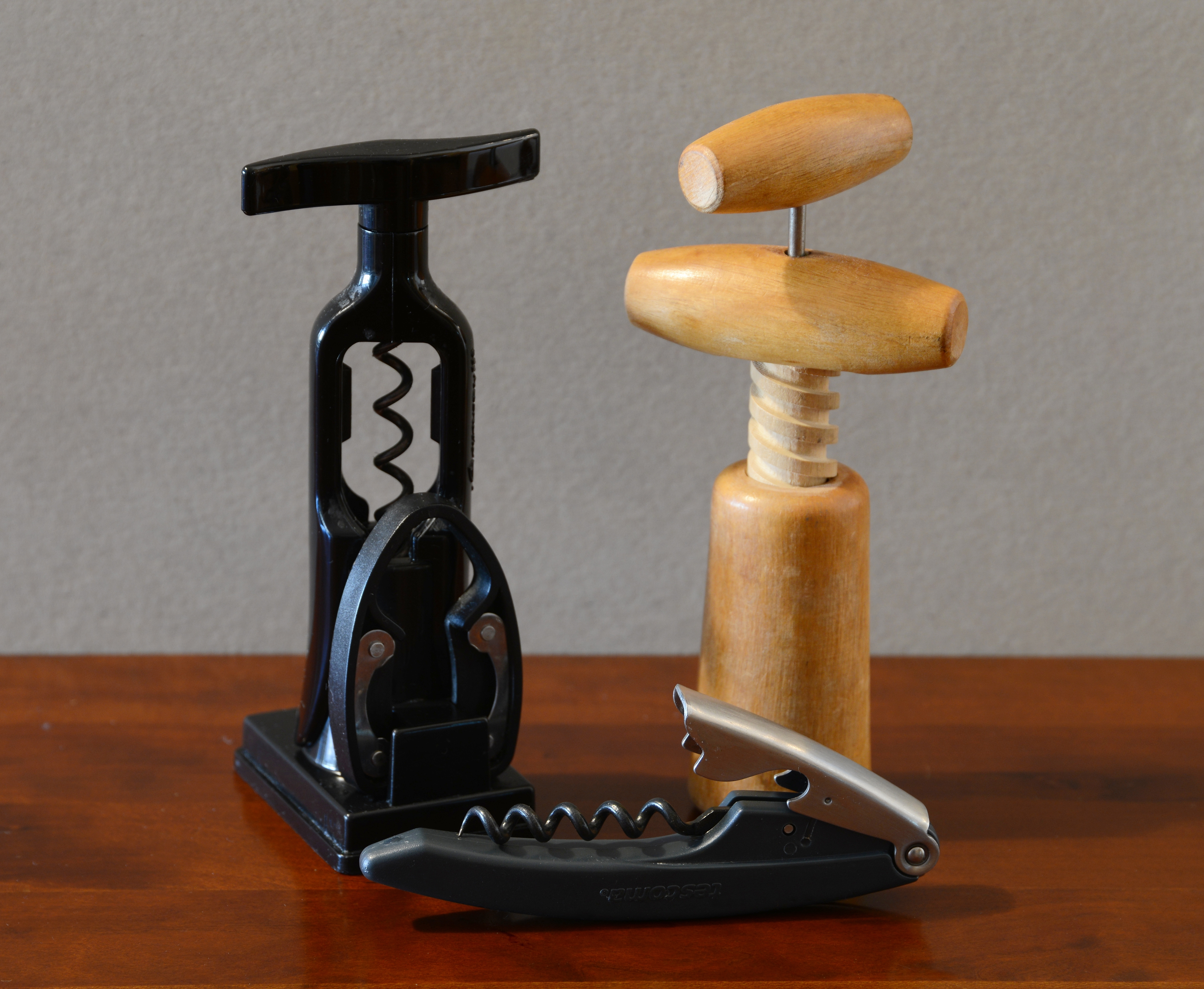
Three types of corkscrew: two modern (left and bottom) and one old (right)

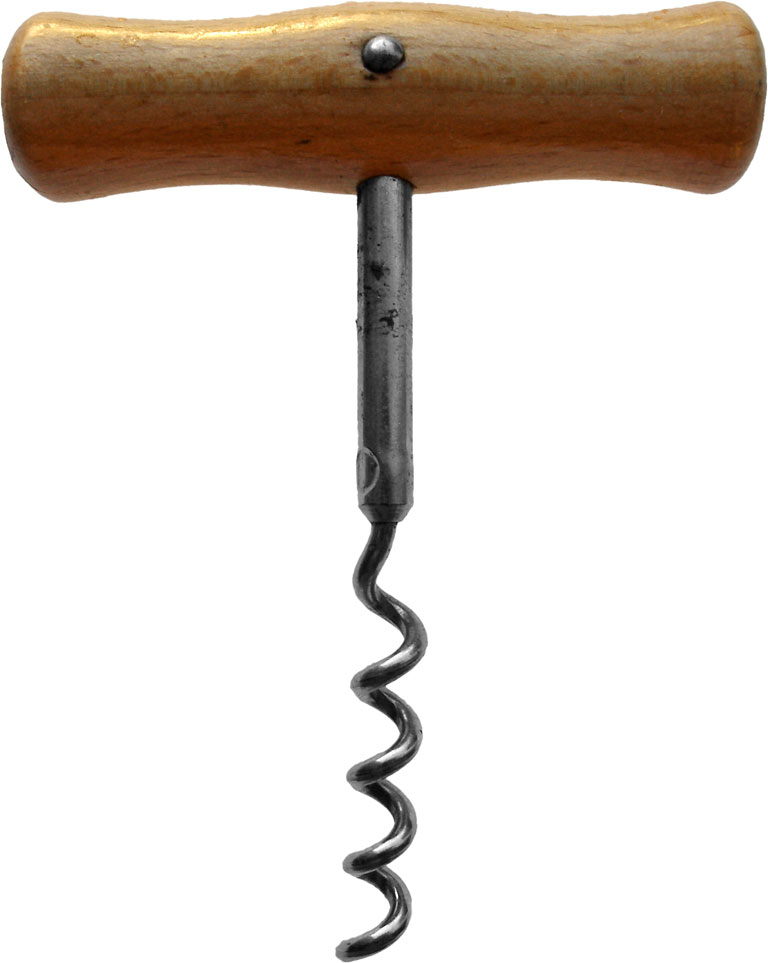
A basic corkscrew

A corkscrew is a tool for drawing corks from wine bottles and other household bottles that may be sealed with corks. In its traditional form, a corkscrew simply consists of a pointed metallic helix (often called the "worm") attached to a handle, which the user screws into the cork and pulls to extract it. Corkscrews are necessary because corks themselves, being small and smooth, are difficult to grip and remove, particularly when inserted fully into an inflexible glass bottle. More recent styles of corkscrew incorporate various systems of levers that further increase the amount of force that can be applied outwards upon the cork, making the extraction of difficult corks easier.

== History ==
The design of the corkscrew may have been derived from the gun worm, which was a device from at least the early 1630s used by men to remove unspent charges from a musket's barrel in a similar fashion.

The corkscrew is possibly an English invention, due to the tradition of beer and cider, and Treatise on Cider by John Worlidge in 1676 describes "binning of tightly corked cider bottles on their sides", although the earliest reference to a corkscrew is, "steel worm used for the drawing of Corks out of Bottles" from 1681.

In 1795, the first corkscrew patent was granted to the Reverend Samuel Henshall, in England. The clergyman affixed a simple disk, now known as the Henshall Button, between the worm and the shank. The disk prevents the worm from going too deep into the cork, forces the cork to turn with the turning of the crosspiece, and thus breaks the adhesion between the cork and the neck of the bottle. The disk is designed and manufactured slightly concave on the underside, which compresses the top of the cork and helps keep it from breaking apart.

A person who collects corkscrews is a helixophile.

== Types ==
=== Basic ===
In its traditional form, a corkscrew is simply a steel screw attached to a perpendicular handle, made of wood or some other material. The user grips the handle and screws the metal point into the cork, until the helix is firmly embedded, then a vertical pull on the corkscrew extracts the cork from the bottle. The handle of the corkscrew allows for a commanding grip to ease removal of the cork.

=== Winged corkscrew ===
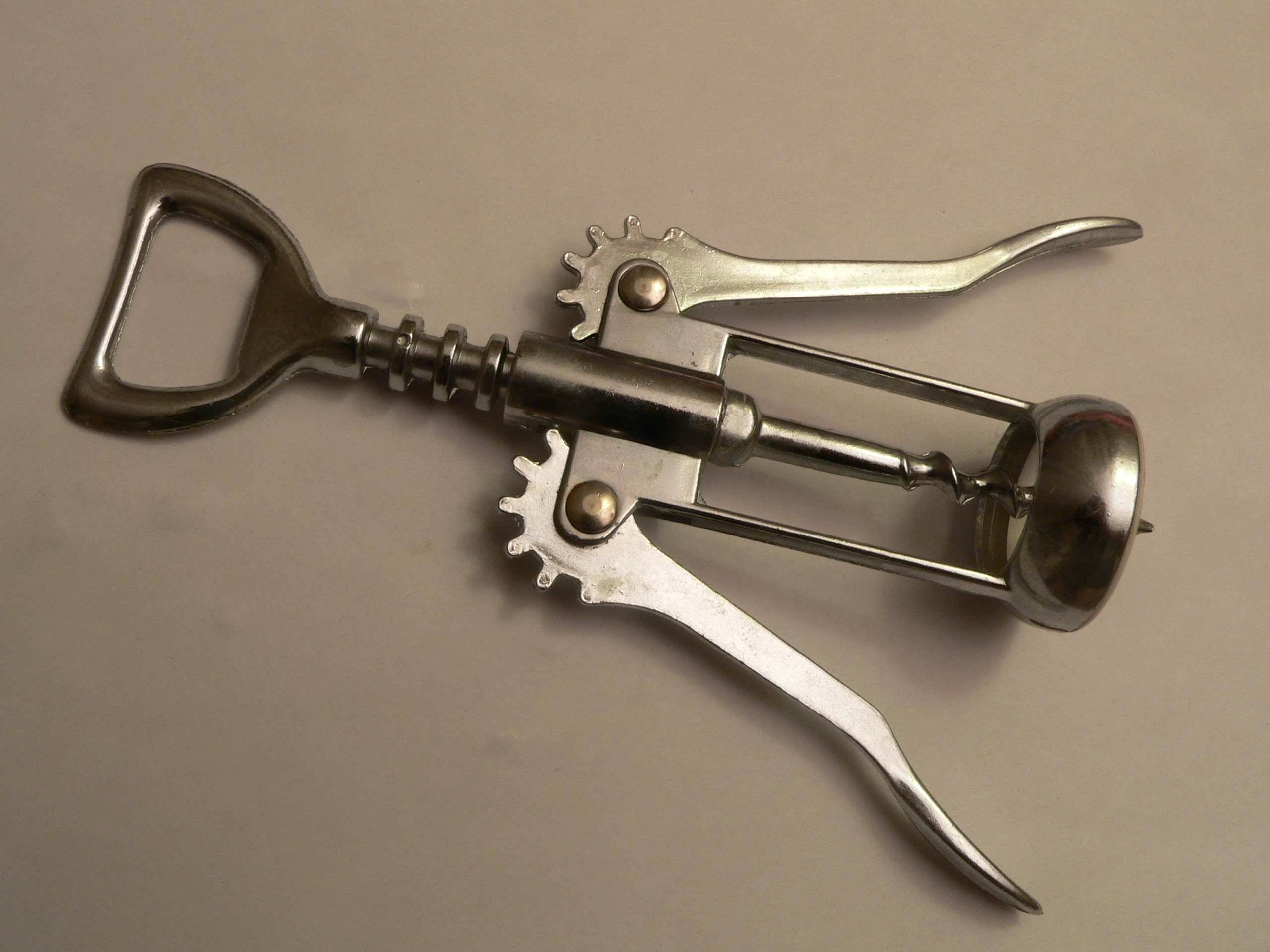
A wing corkscrew with an exposed rack and pinion mechanism

The winged corkscrew, sometimes called a cork extractor, butterfly corkscrew, owl corkscrew, Indian corkscrew, or angel corkscrew, has two levers, one on either side of the worm. As the worm is twisted into the cork, the levers are raised. Pushing down the levers draws the cork from the bottle in one smooth motion. The most common design has a rack and pinion connecting the levers to the body. The head of the central shaft is frequently modified to form a bottle opener, or foil cutter, increasing the utility of the device. Corkscrews of this design are particularly popular in household use.

In 1880, William Burton Baker was issued British Patent No. 2950 for his double lever corkscrew, with both levers sliding onto the upper end of the shank.

The first American patent was in 1930 granted to the Italian Domenico Rosati who emigrated to Chicago, Illinois, to work as bartender before the prohibition. Rosati's design had an exposed rack and pinion mechanism. Such design was adapted by other brands as the wine-market grew in popularity.

The winged owl version, with two side-plates covering the rack and pinion mechanism, was first designed and manufactured in 1932 by the Spanish industrial designer David Olañeta for his brand BOJ and was later adopted by others, such as the 1936 US Patent No. 98,968 by Richard Smythe marked HOOTCH-OWL.

=== Sommelier knife ===
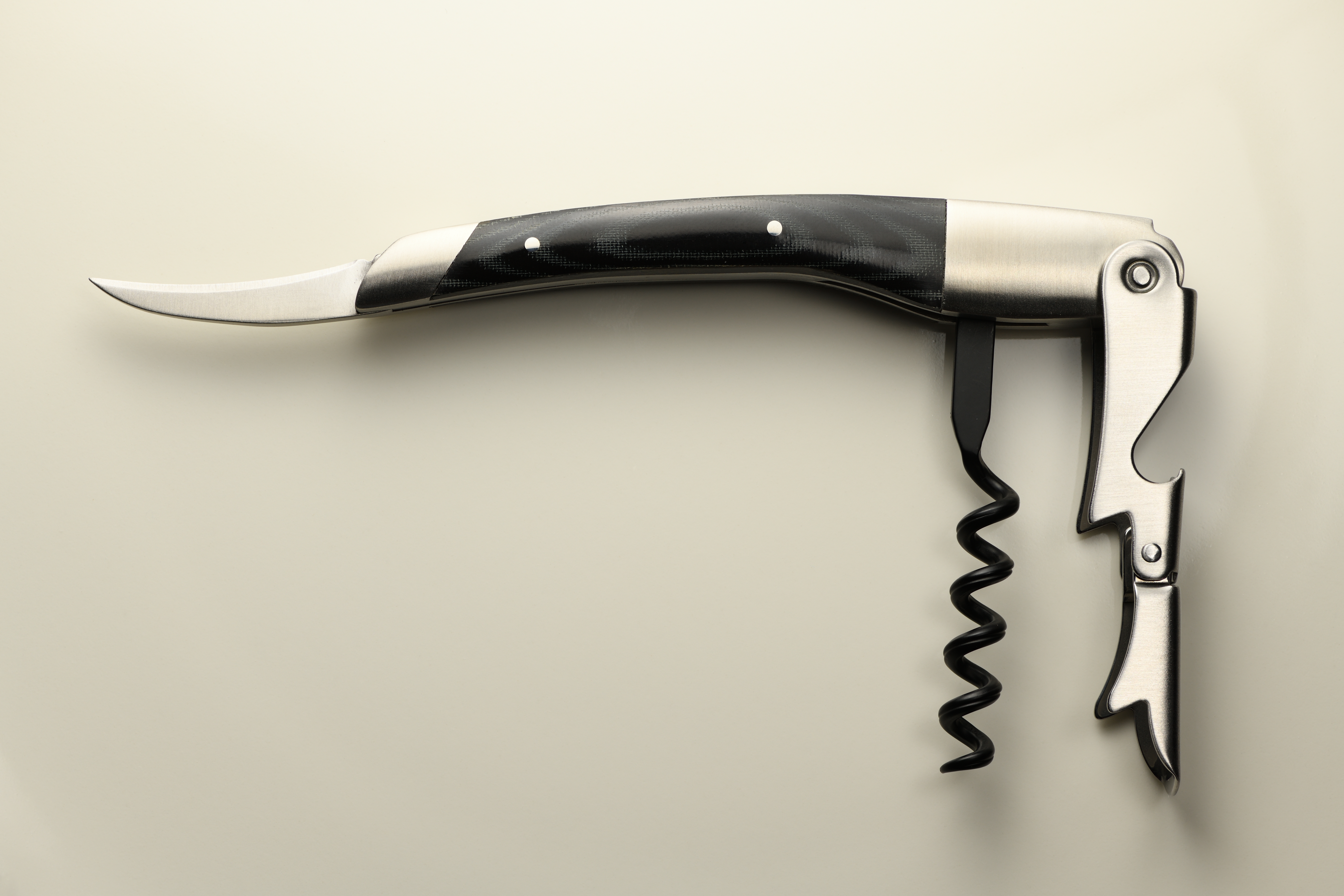
A sommelier knife

A sommelier knife, waiter's friend or wine key is a corkscrew in a folding body similar to a pocket knife. It was conceived by the German Karl Wienke in 1882 and patented in Germany, England, and America.

An arm extends to brace against the lip of the bottle for leverage when removing the cork. Some sommelier knives have two steps on the lever, and often also a bottle opener. A small hinged knife blade is housed in the handle end to be used in cutting the foil wrapping the neck of many wine bottles. A corkscrew of this type can be used more quickly (and with more "show" or panache) than a wing-type corkscrew.

The term "wine key" came into existence due to the German inventor's last name, Wienke, which is difficult for English speakers to pronounce. When ordering the product from catalogs, the meaning and origins of the new Wienke Corkscrew gradually became lost and it was simply referred to as a "Winekey" or wine key. Patent number 283,731, August 21, 1883, simply refers to it as "C.F.A. WIENKE LEVER CORKSCREW."

=== Twin-prong cork puller ===
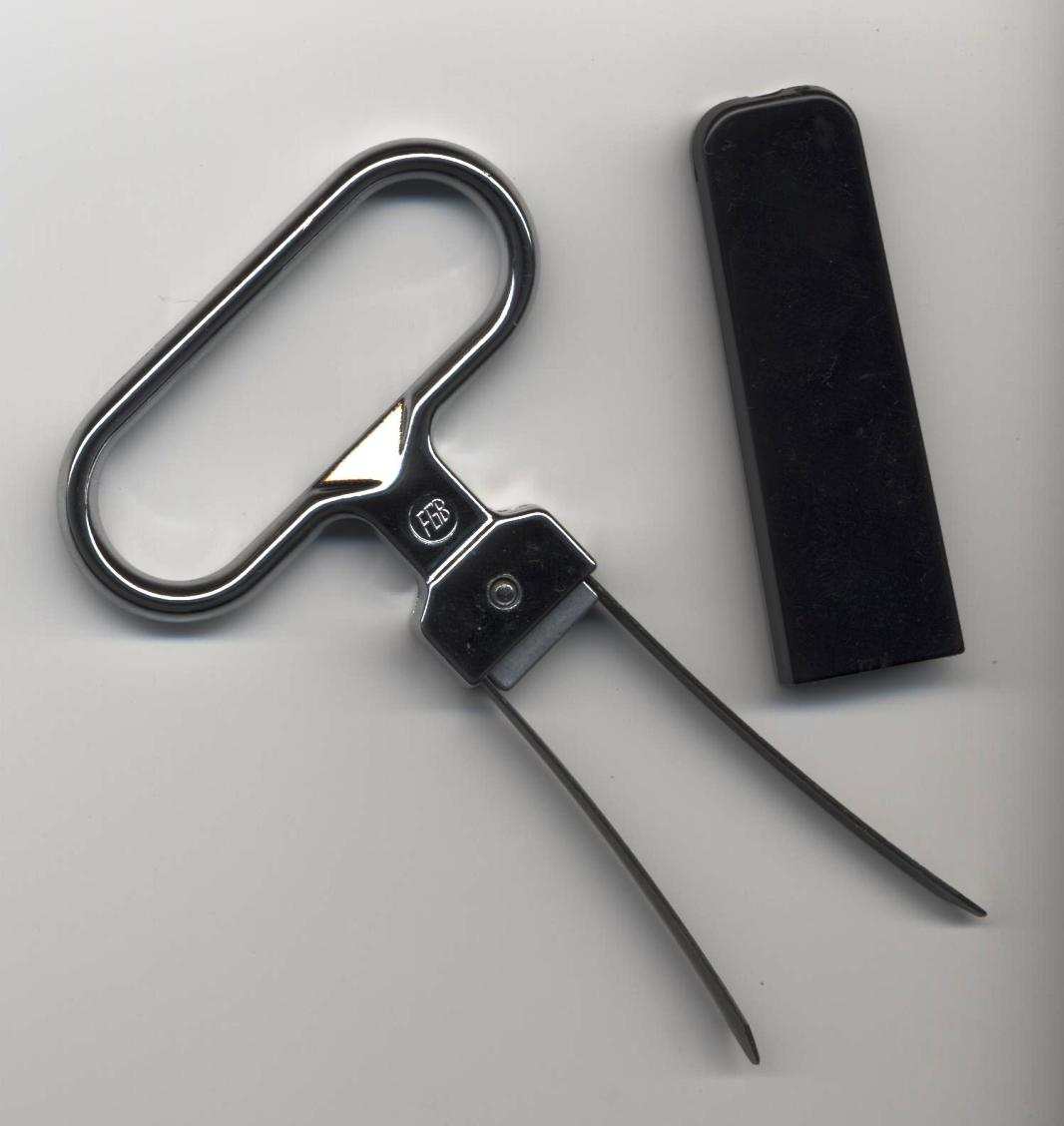
A twin prong cork puller

Also known as butler's friend or "Ah-So" (from the German ach so!, meaning 'Now I understand!'), the twin-prong cork puller can extract a stopper without damaging it, to allow for sampling the wine before re-inserting the stopper. The stopper is removed by pushing the prongs between the cork and the neck of the bottle, and twisting the stopper out of the bottle. Replacing the stopper involves taking it between the two prongs, then twisting it into the bottle and pulling out the prongs. It can also extract a stopper in bad condition.

=== Lever corkscrew ===
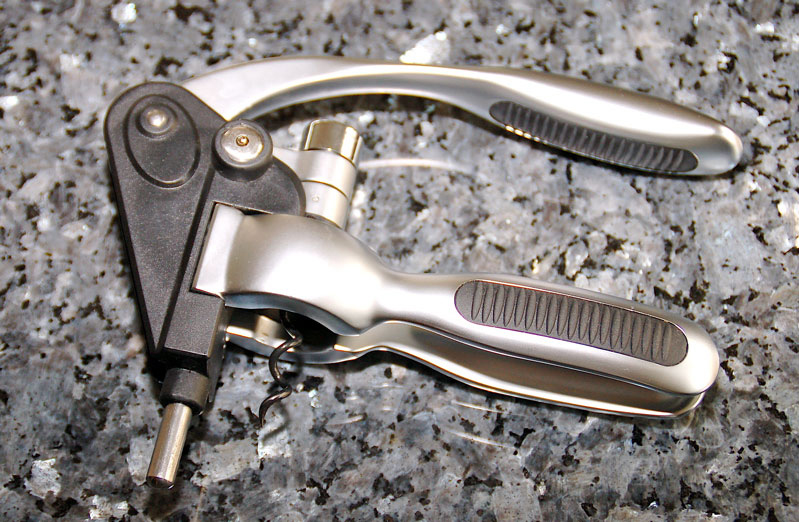
A lever corkscrew

The lever or "rabbit" corkscrew is operated using a pair of handles which are used to grip the neck of the bottle, and a lever which is simply pressed down to twist the screw into the cork, then lifted to extract the cork. Expelling the cork from the device is done with a similar press/lift action. This style of corkscrew is much bulkier, and typically much more expensive, than other styles, but is much faster.

=== Mounted corkscrew ===
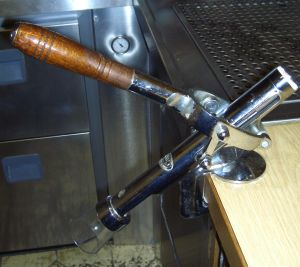
A table-mounted corkscrew

The mounted corkscrew was invented in the late 1800s for use in homes, hotel bars, and restaurants in an era where all bottles were stopped with corks. They are screwed or clamped to counters or walls. When beer began to be sold in bottles, bars required a speedy way to open them. Most early mounted corkscrews were designed to open beer bottles with short corks. Modern ones are made for longer wine corks.

=== Screwpull ===
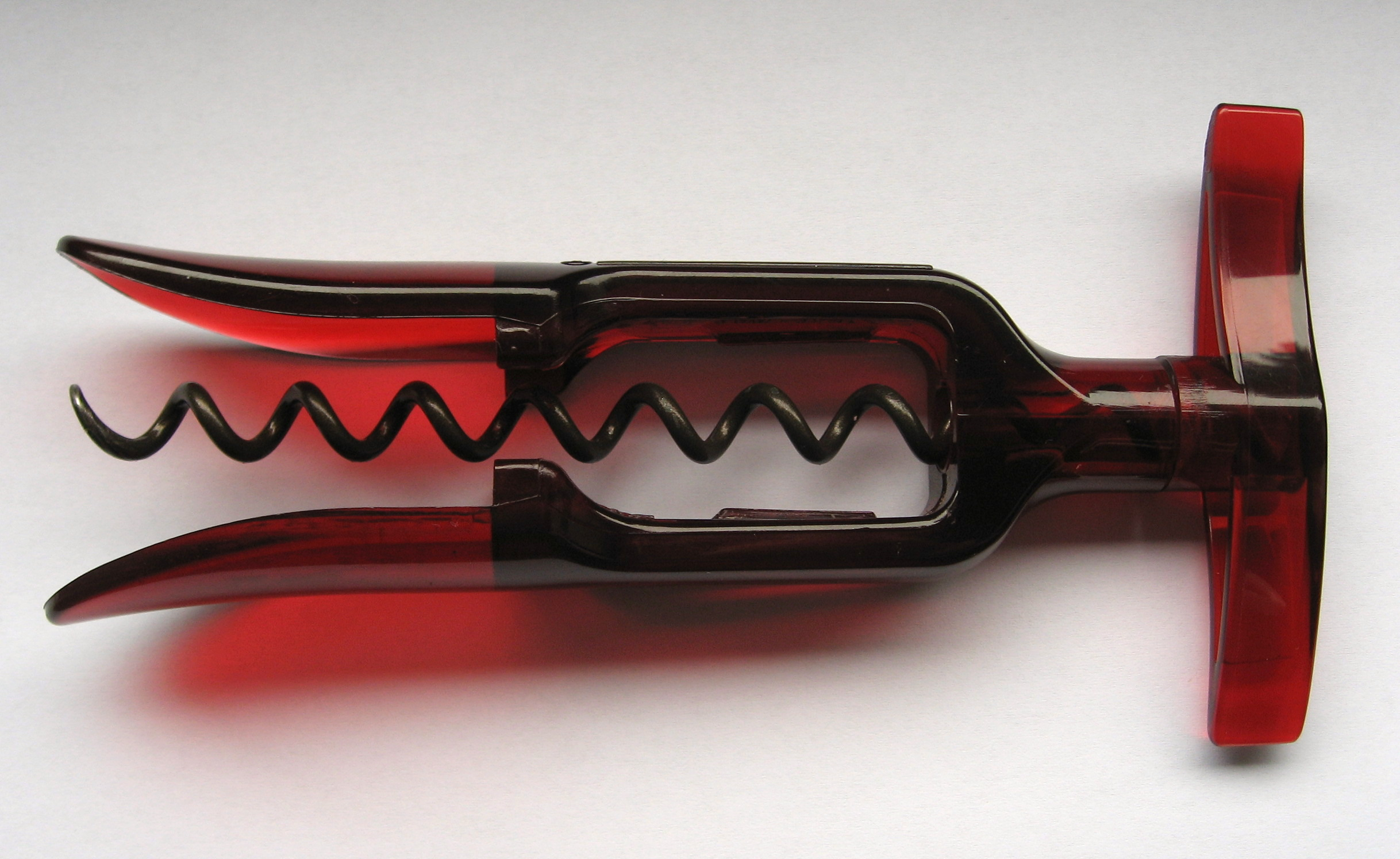
A Screwpull type corkscrew

A birambeau Screwpull type corkscrew

In 1979, Herbert Allen introduced the "Screwpull" corkscrew. The device was meant to make opening wine bottles fool-proof.

The Screwpull wraps around the top of the bottle, with a plastic screw that simply needs to be turned to remove the cork, without effort. The spiral is coated with Teflon, which reduces friction as it twists into the cork, ensuring it is removed intact without pulling.

The Screwpull is part of The Museum of Modern Art’s permanent collection.

The company was sold to Le Creuset in 1992.

=== Others ===
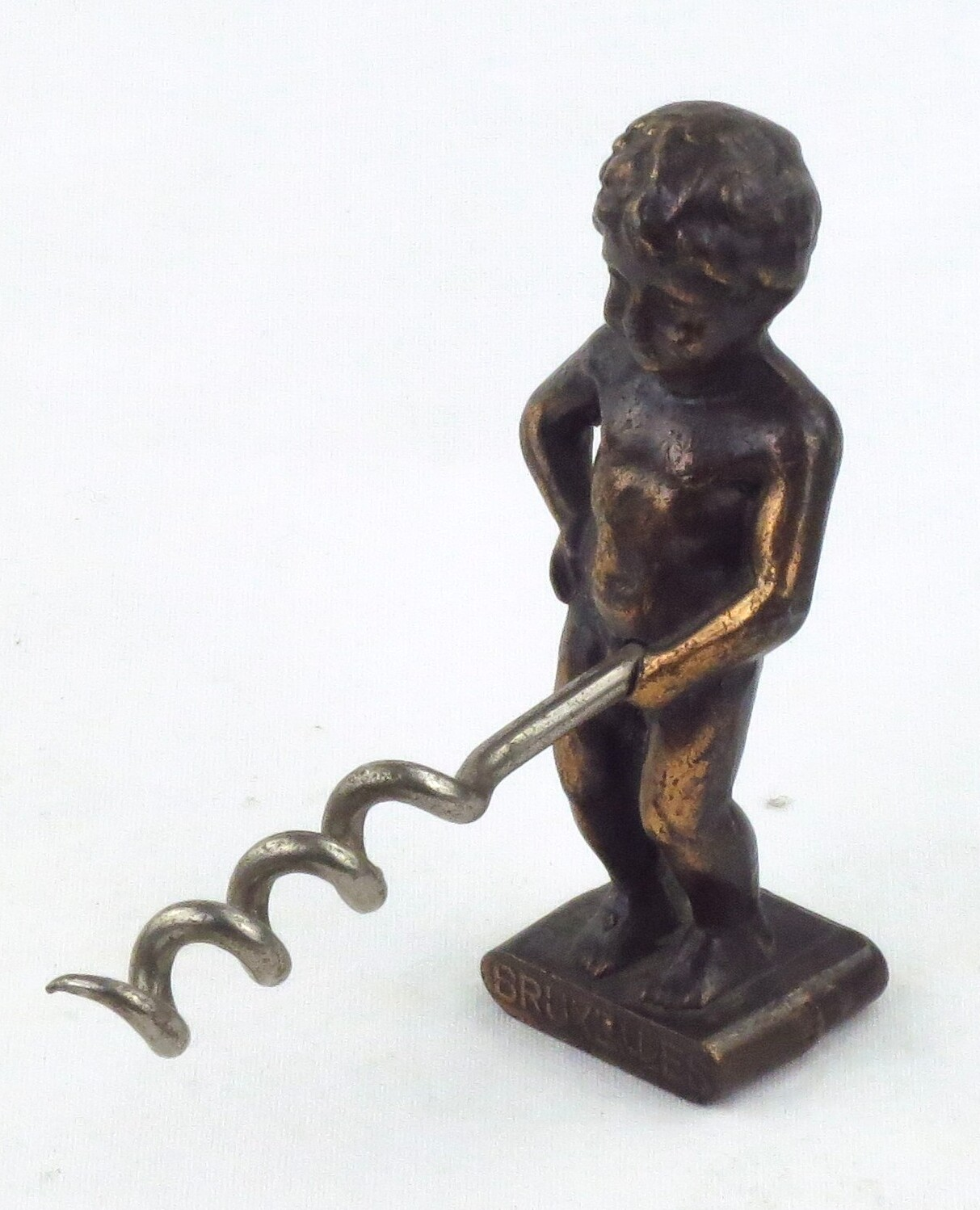
A novelty corkscrew made to resemble the statue Manneken Pis, sold as a souvenir to tourists in Brussels

There are many other styles of corkscrew which are not widely used in consumer settings, such as high-priced elaborate devices for specialists, and for industrial uses.

== See also ==
- Wine accessory
- Wine tasting
