= Lamon (disambiguation) =

Lamon is an Italian comune.

Lamon may also refer to:

- Lamon (Crete), a town of ancient Crete
- Lamon (name), a list of people with the surname or given name
- Lamon Records, an American record label

== See also ==
- Lamon Bay, Luzon, the Philippines
- Lamon sheep, an Italian breed of sheep
- Lemon (disambiguation)
