= Bionnus =

Coordinates: 35°09′33″N 24°31′12″E

Bionnus or Bionnos (Ancient Greek: Βίωννος) was a town and polis (city-state) of ancient Crete. It is known from epigraphic evidence. Bionnus is mentioned in a list of theorodokoi of Delphi, dated between 230 and 210 BCE, between the cities of Psycheion and Matala.

The site of Bionnus is located near modern Pyrgos ('high ground'), about 2 kilometres (1.2 mi) south of Kerames.
