= Laymon =

Laymon is a surname. Notable people with the surname include:

- Kiese Laymon (born 1974), American writer, editor, and professor
- Richard Laymon (1947–2001), American author
- Tracie Laymon, American screenwriter, producer, and film director

== See also ==
- Lamon (name)
- Layman (surname)
