= 18-pounder long gun =

Naval gun

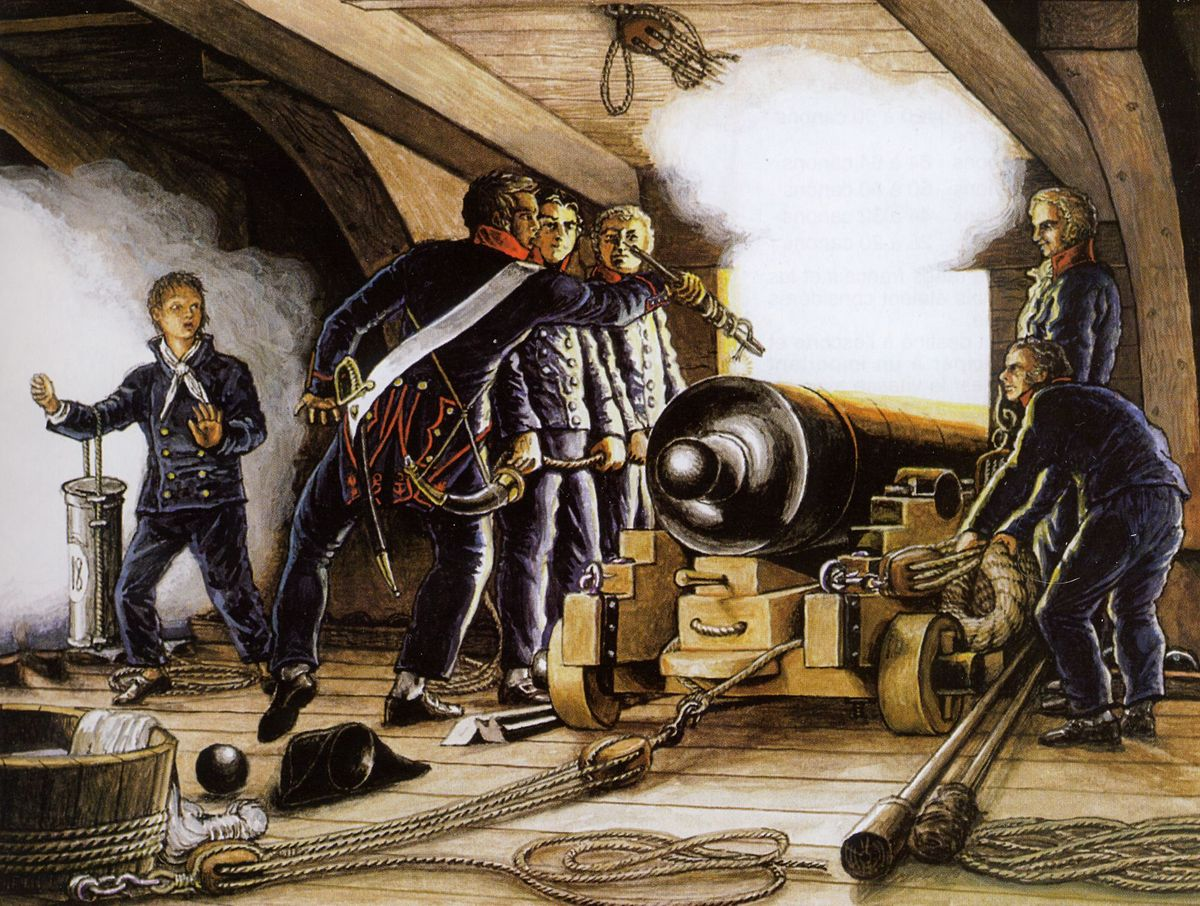
- Louis-Philippe Crépin engraving of a French 18-pounder long gun being fired
- Type: naval gun
- Place of origin: France

Service history
- Used by: France, Spain, Great Britain, Netherlands, Sweden, United States, Mysore

Specifications
- Mass: 2,060 kg 365 kg (mount)
- Barrel length: 2.572 m (18.544 calibres)
- Shell weight: 8.8 kg
- Calibre: 138.7 mm

The 18-pounder long gun was an intermediary calibre piece of naval artillery mounted on warships of the Age of Sail. They were used as main guns on the most typical frigates of the early 19th century, on the second deck of third-rate ships of the line, and even on the third deck of late first-rate ships of the line.

== Usage ==
As the 18-pounder calibre was consistent with both the French and the British calibre systems, it was used in many European navies between the 17th and the 19th century. It was a heavy calibre for early ships of the line, arming, for instance, the main batteries of Couronne in 1636. From the late 18th century, the French Navy used the 18-pounder in three capacities: as the main gun on frigates, as the battery on the upper gundeck of two-deckers, and lastly on the top deck of three-deckers.

French frigates began carrying the 18-pounder under Louis XV, when the two Pourvoyeuse-class frigates, originally designed to carry 24-pounders, were equipped with it; at the time, a typical frigate would carry 12-pounders. Under Louis XVI, from 1779, the 18-pounder gradually became the standard calibre for frigates, starting with the Hébé class. These frigates were built on standard patterns designed by Jacques-Noël Sané, carrying 26, and later 28 main guns, complemented with smaller pieces on the forecastle. Around 130 of these frigates were built. At the end of the First French Empire, 24-pounder frigates began supplanting the 18-pounder frigates. Frigates built after the Bourbon Restoration used a different artillery system, one involving 30-pounders.

On two-deckers, the 18-pounder was mounted on the upper deck as secondary artillery, to complement the 36-pounder main artillery on the lower deck. A 74-gun would carry thirty 18-pounders; this lighter secondary battery added firepower to the ship without raising the centre of gravity too much. In rough weather, vessels often could not use their main battery lest water enter through the gun-ports, and the secondary battery then became the vessel's main armament; for example, the Droits de l'Homme was effectively reduced to the firepower of a frigate when she fought the action of 13 January 1797 in stormy weather, leading to her destruction at the hand of two British frigates that would normally not have been a match for her; in the opposite case, during the Glorious First of June, Vengeur du Peuple used her main batteries but became unmanageable and sank after taking in water from her lower gun-ports, whose covers had been ripped off in a collision with HMS Brunswick.

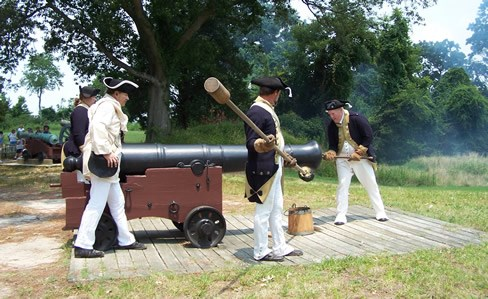
Re-enactors dressed in American uniforms "load" an 18-pounder cannon at Yorktown National Park, United States

Three-deckers used 36-pounders on their lower decks and 24-pounders on their second deck. Until 1803, the third deck was equipped with 12-pounder guns, as a heavier gun would have destabilised the ship; after this date, however, Sané introduced design improvements that allowed installation of 18-pounders on the third deck of Impérial; later 120-gun ships of the line used the same arrangement; these ships carried thirty-four 18-pounders. During the First French Empire, 18-pounders would also arm Type 1 Model Towers for coastal defence.

After introduction of rifled artillery in the middle 19th century, long 18-pounders were converted into so-called "14 cm n° 1 rifled muzzle-loaders Model 1864", by etching grooves on the inside of the barrel.

== British iron 18-pounders ==
=== Early iron 18-pounders ===
James mentions 6 different 18-pounder guns in the early 1720s. Their length varied from 8 1/2 ft (2.6 m) to 11 ft (3.3 m), in 6 in (0.15 m) increments.

Subsequent mentions of the 18-pounder describe what are likely 3 types of 18-pounder, whose dimensions changed little through the 1700s:

Gun length (ft)	Weight (cwt)	Date first mentioned
9	~40	1735
9 1/2	42	1780
11	~51	1745

The gun of 9 ft appears in a diagram from about 1735, where its weight was listed as 41 hundredweight 1 quarter 8 pounds. The 1743 mensuration contains an 18-pounder of the same length and weight, with very similar dimensions. In tests in Minorca, one of the 18-pounders used was 9 ft long and weighed 39 hundredweight 1 quarter 3 pounds. 3 guns of 9 feet length from the reign of George II (1727–1760) currently survive at the Gut of Digby in Nova Scotia. Their dimensions are similar to the gun in the 1735 diagram. Adye's notebook from 1766 has an 18-pounder of 9 ft with almost identical dimensions to that in the 1735 diagram and 1743 mensuration. The establishment of 1764 mentioned an 18-pounder gun of 9 ft and 40 hundredweight. Walton included a gun with this length and weight in his table of dimensions in 1780, with similar dimensions to the 9 ft gun in the 1743 mensuration and the 1766 notebook. Adye's manuals of 1801 and 1813 mention the 9 ft 40 hundredweight 18-pounder, though by then it was being superseded by the newer Blomefield guns.

The gun of 9 1/2 ft is mentioned in Walton's table of dimensions in 1780, where its weight was 42 hundredweight. It also appears in Adye's manuals of 1801 and 1813, when it was also being superseded by Blomefield pattern guns.

The gun of 11 ft is first mentioned in tests in Minorca, where its weight was given as 51 hundredweight 5 pounds. In 1820, 6 iron 18-pounders are mentioned, with weights from 50 to 54 1/4 hundredweight. In 1857, an 18-pounder of 11 ft, "O.P" (old pattern) was in the list of guns submitted to the Committee on Ordnance.

=== Blomefield's 18-pounders ===
Sir Thomas Blomefield developed several iron 18-pounders as part of his system of gun construction from the 1790s onward:

Gun length (ft)	Weight (cwt)	Date first cast	Method of Construction
9	42 1/2	before 1801	newly cast
8	37 3/4	before 1801	newly cast
6	27	before 1825	newly cast
7	22	before 1840s	bored-up from Blomefield 9-pounder 24 cwt
6	20	before 1840s	bored-up from Blomefield 12-pounder 22 cwt
5 1/2	15	before 1840s	bored-up from Blomefield 9-pounder 17 cwt

The guns of 9 feet 42 1/2 hundredweight and 8 feet 37 3/4 hundredweight were widely used as siege and garrison guns in addition to their naval role. As a siege gun, the 18-pounder served the same role as the Canon de 16 Gribeauval. The gun of 9 feet 42 1/2 hundredweight was used on the upper deck of 74-gun ships of the line. The gun of 8 feet 37 3/4 hundredweight was used on the main deck of 46- and 42-gun frigates. In 1825 Mould noted the gun of 6 feet 27 hundredweight was "not used at present." Although the guns of 6 feet 20 hundredweight and 5 1/2 feet 15 hundredweight were bored-up from Blomefield guns, an 1865 report mentions that they were designed by Alexander Dickson (Blomefield's successor).

=== Congreve's 18-pounder ===
William Congreve designed an 18-pounder gun patterned after his 24-pounder gun, after the latter proved successful in trials in 1813. It was 6 feet 10 inches in length and 32 hundredweight. It had the same conical shape with more metal around the breech, and trunnions further to the rear. 8 pieces were mentioned in lists submitted to the Committee on Ordnance in 1857, though it may have only been experimental.

=== 1865 lists ===
In 1865, 4 18-pounder guns were recommended to be retained in service, and 4 18-pounder guns were recommended to be abolished:

Gun length (ft)	Weight (wt)	Status
9	42	Retained
8	38	Retained
6	20	Retained
5 1/2	15	Retained
9	40	Abolished
6 5/6	32	Abolished
6	27	Abolished
7	22	Abolished

The guns retained were Blomefield or Dickson pattern guns mentioned above, as were the guns of 6 feet and 7 feet to be abolished. The gun of 6 feet 10 inches was a Congreve gun. The gun of 9 feet 40 hundredweight is not known, but it may have been the old 18-pounder of 9 feet from the establishment of 1764.

== British use of 18-pounders ==
The Royal Navy used the 18-pounder on frigates, which carried 28 guns. Fourth-rate ships carried 26 on their secondary batteries, and third rates carried 28. Unlike the French, the British used second rates, of 90 to 98 guns; the 90-gun vessels carried thirty 18-pounders on their middle deck, while the 98-gun vessels carried a total of sixty 18-pounders, distributed over both the second and the third deck. First rates carried thirty-four 18-pounders on their third deck and 24-pounders on the middle deck.

In his discussion of the single-ship action in which the French frigate Piémontaise captured the East Indiaman Warren Hastings on 11 June 1805, the naval historian William James compared the 18-pounder medium guns on Warren Hastings with the 18-pounder long guns that the British Royal Navy used. The medium 18-pounder was 6 ft (1.8 m) long, and weighed 26 3/4 long cwt (3,000 lb; 1,360 kg); the Royal Navy's long 18-pounder was 9 ft (2.7 m) long and weighed 42 long cwt (4,700 lb; 2,100 kg).

== Citations and references ==
=== References ===
- James, William; Chamier, Frederick (1837). The Naval History of Great Britain: From the Declaration of War by France In 1793 to the Accession of George IV. London, UK: R. Bentley. OCLC 656581450.
