= Larman =

Larman is a surname. Notable people with the surname include:

- Craig Larman (born 1958), Canadian computer scientist and author
- Drew Larman (born 1985), American ice hockey player

== See also ==
- Laraman (surname)
- Layman (surname)
