= Laraman (surname) =

Laraman is a surname. Notable people with the surname include:

- Aaron Laraman (born 1979), English cricketer
- Peter Laraman (1940–2020), English footballer

== See also ==
- Larman
