= HDMS Det Store Bælt =

1782 frigate of the Royal Dano-Norwegian Navy

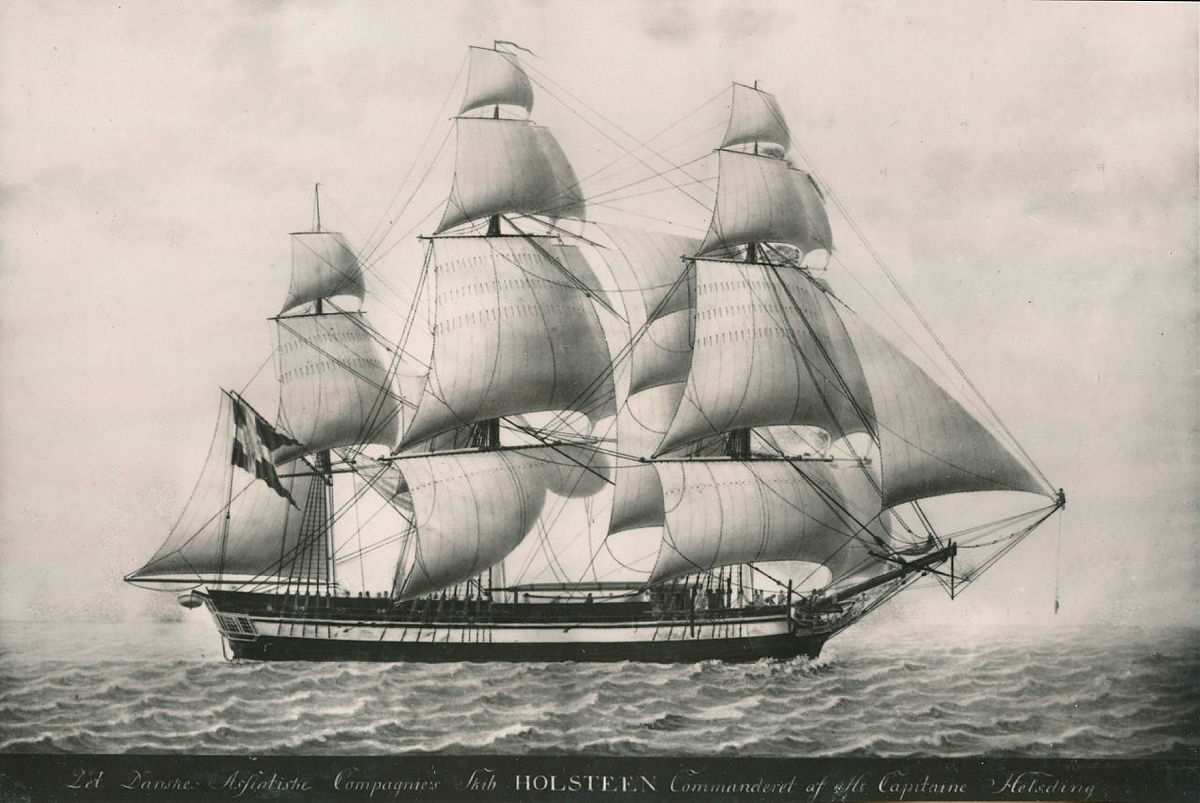
- Holstein in 1803.

History

Denmark & Norway
- Name: Det Store Bælt
- Builder: Henrik Gerner at Bodenhoffs Shipyard, Copenhagen
- Launched: 22 June 1782
- Commissioned: 1773
- Decommissioned: 1800
- Fate: Sold to the Danish Asiatic company

Denmark
- Name: renamed Holsten, on purchase in 1800
- Owner: Danish Asiatic Company
- Acquired: By purchase in 1800
- Fate: Condemned at Mauritius probably 1807

General characteristics
- Class & type: Frigate
- Length: 130 ft 9 in (39.85 m)
- Beam: 35 ft (11 m)
- Draught: 14 ft 9 in (4.50 m)
- Sail plan: Frigate
- Armament: 36 × 12–pounder guns

HDMS Det Store Bælt (Note: The original designs of the figurehead and ornamentation of the gallery are available at this reference by clicking "vis") was a frigate of the Royal Dano-Norwegian Navy, launched in 1782. In 1800, she was sold to the Danish Asiatic Company and renamed Holsteen.

== Construction and design ==
Det Store Bælt was constructed at Bodenhoffs Plads to a design by Henrik Gerner. She was the first of at least three frigates constructed for the navy at Andreas Bodenhoff's dockyard. The next were Friderichsværn (1783) and Hvide Ørn (1784). Det Store Bælt was launched on 22 June 1782 and the construction was completed in August 1783.

Store Bælt was 130 ft 9 in (39.85 m) long with a beam of 35 ft (11 m) and a draught of 14 ft 9 in (4.50 m). Her complement was 274 men. Her armament was 36 12-pounder guns.

== Career ==
=== Naval service ===
She was commissioned in the Royal Danish Navy and served for some years as the cadet training ship in the North and Baltic seas. In 1785, she was under the command of Ole Andreas Kierulff (1742–1822).

In 1793 she was patrolling in the North Sea under the command of A J Herbst, and in 1795 and 1797 was part of a joint Danish/Swedish squadron enforcing neutrality and protecting trade. In 1797, she was under the command of Hans Lindholm.

=== DAC service ===
In 1800 the Royal Danish Navy sold Store Bælt for 7,800 rigsdaler to the Danish Asiatic Company who renamed her Holsten

From her home port of Copenhagen Holsten completed three voyages to the East Indies:

- 1800–1801
- 1801–1803 under captain Jan Hendrick Helsding
- 1804–1805 also under captain Jan Hendrick Helsding.

== Fate ==
On 12 June 1805 Holstein, Helfding, master, was reported off Dover on her way from Bengal to Copenhagen. It appears that it was on a fourth voyage that she met her fate.

A report in the Madras Courier dated 10 February 1807 stated that the Danish company's ship Holstein was sailing from Copenhagen to Serampore when she was dismasted off Ceylon. She sailed to Mauritius for repairs. On reaching Mauritius (then known as Isle de France) Holsten was condemned as unseaworthy.

The DAC replaced her, in December 1806, with the purchase from the French at Mauritius the recently captured East Indiaman Warren Hastings, which the Company then renamed Holsten. (Note: CAVEAT: Differing sources report 1805, perhaps 1806, or 1807 as the year of demise. The first two editors here have concluded the true year is 1807 - see Talk page)

== Namesakes ==
At least two other ships have borne similar names"

- Store Bælt (1875–1912), a gunboat.
- Storebælt (1995–1999), a patrol vessel.
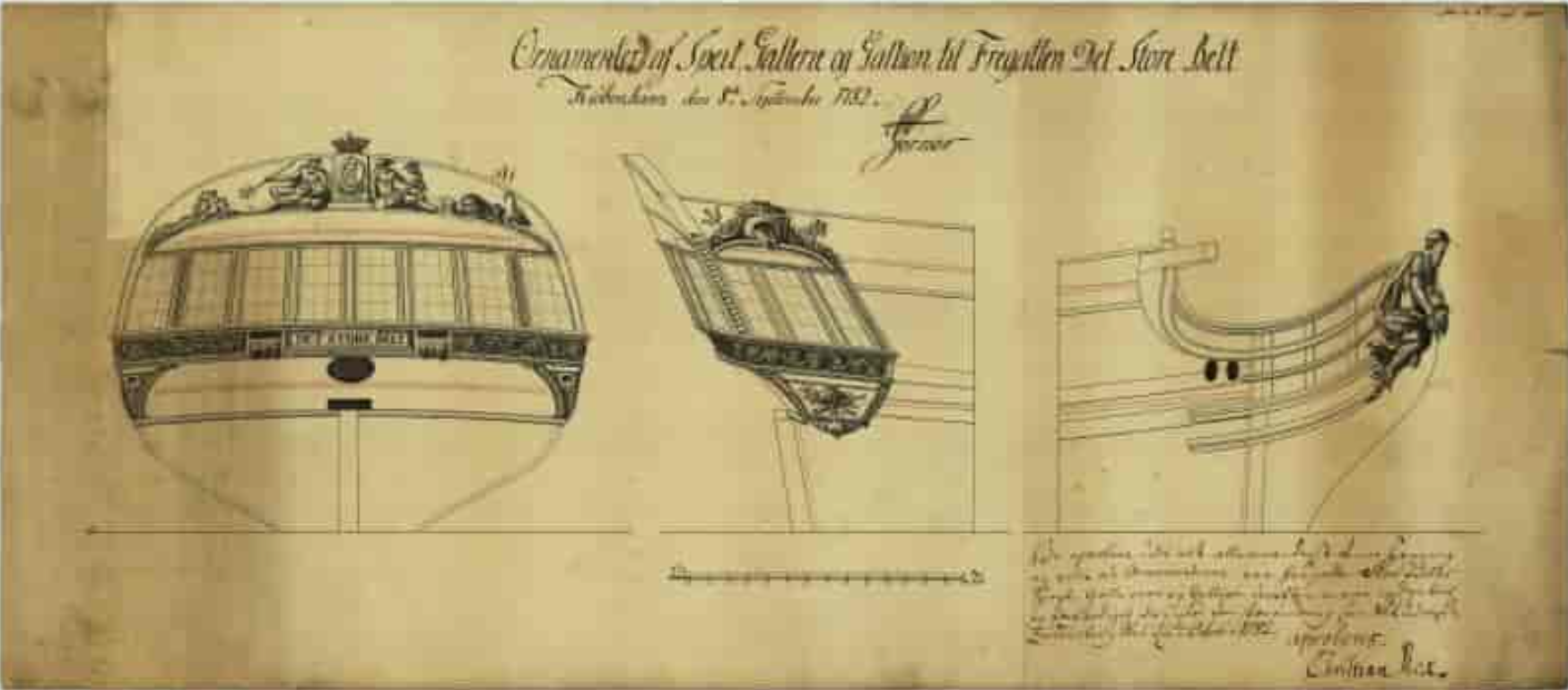
Drawing for Det Store Bælt, c. 1782.

== Citations ==
- Balsved – Danish Naval History website
- Royal Danish Navy Museum database List of Ships
- (in Danish)T. A. Topsøe-Jensen og Emil Marquard (1935) "Officerer i den dansk-norske Søetat 1660-1814 og den danske Søetat 1814-1932“. Two volumes. Download here.
