= Herbert Allen (inventor) =

American inventor (1907–1990)

Herbert Allen (1907-1990) was an American inventor.

Allen was born May 2, 1907. He graduated from Rice University in 1929.

Herbert Allen invented the Screwpull brand of corkscrews in 1979.

Herbert Allen was issued 13 patents out of 13 filed patents. His earliest patent was on May 8, 1978. His last filing was on August, 24th 1988.

He died June 12, 1990, in Houston, Texas.
