= Isaac Layman =

American photographer

Isaac Layman (1977) is an American photographer. Layman is known for his large-scale photographs of everyday objects. Layman received a Bachelor of Fine Arts degree from the University of Washington in 2003.

His work is included in the collections of the Seattle Art Museum, the Walker Art Gallery and the Portland Art Museum.
