= 18-pounder short gun =

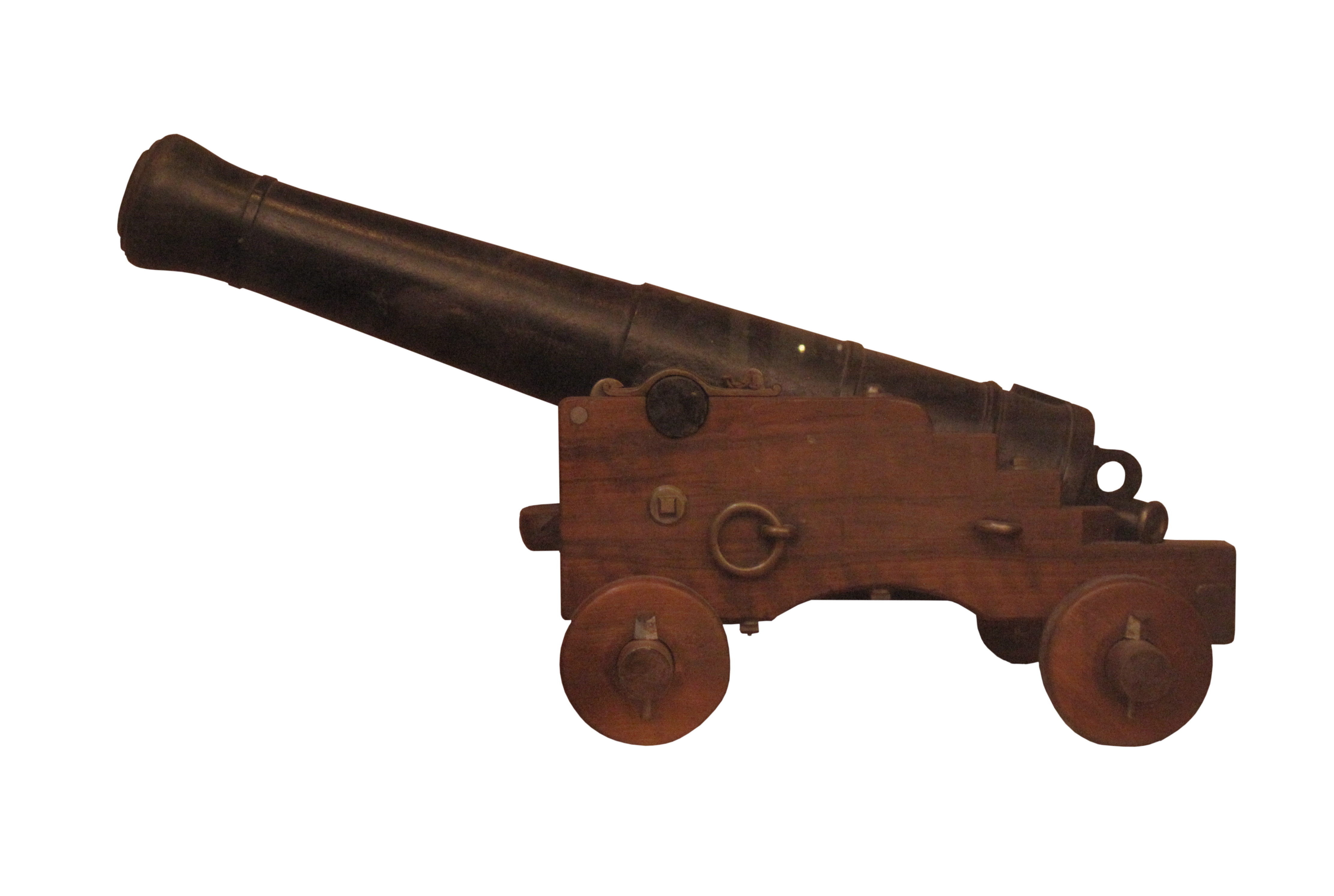
- 1/4th Scale model of an 18-pounder short gun, model 1824. On display at the Musée national de la Marine, Paris.
- Type: Naval gun
- Place of origin: France

Service history
- Used by: France, Spain, Great Britain, Netherlands, Sweden, United States

Specifications
- Shell weight: 8.8 kg
- Calibre: 138.7 mm

The 18-pounder short gun was an intermediary calibre piece of artillery mounted on warships and merchantmen of the Age of Sail. It was a lighter version of the 18-pounder long gun, compromising power and range for weight.

In his discussion of the single-ship action in which the French frigate Piémontaise captured the East Indiaman Warren Hastings on 11 June 1805, the naval historian William James compared the 18-pounder medium guns on Warren Hastings with the 18-pounder long guns that the British Royal Navy used. The medium 18-pounder was 6 ft (1.8 m) long, and weighed 26 3/4 long cwt (3,000 lb; 1,360 kg); the Royal Navy's long 18-pounder was 9 ft (2.7 m) and weighed 42 1/2 long cwt (4,760 lb; 2,160 kg).

== Citations and references ==
Citations

References

- James, William; Chamier, Frederick (1837). The Naval History of Great Britain: From the Declaration of War by France In 1793 to the Accession of George IV. London, UK: R. Bentley. OCLC 656581450.
