= Alfred Layman =

English cricketer

Alfred Richard Layman (24 April 1858 – 8 November 1940) was an English amateur cricketer. He was a right-handed batsman and a wicket-keeper who played in one first-class cricket match for Kent County Cricket Club.

Layman was born at Norwood in Surrey and educated at Hurstpierpoint College and Blackheath Proprietary School, where he played cricket for the school. He lived in Beckenham and played club cricket as a wicket-keeper for Granville Cricket Club. His only first-class appearance came in the 1893 County Championship against Lancashire, one of five wicket-keepers that Kent used during the season.

Layman worked as an auctioneer and as a surveyor. He was a freemason, a member of the Worshipful Company of Turners and became a Freeman of the City of London in 1913. He married Annie Pooles in 1913. Layman died at Beckenham in 1940 aged 82.

== Bibliography ==
- Carlaw, Derek (2020). Kent County Cricketers, A to Z: Part One (1806–1914) (PDF). Cardiff: ACS.
