= Lamon (Crete) =

Coordinates: 35°11′32″N 24°24′02″E

Lamon (Ancient Greek: Λάμων) was a town on the south coast of ancient Crete. According to the Stadiasmus Maris Magni, it had a harbour and was located 150 stadia from Psychea and 30 stadia from Apollonia.

The site of Lamon is tentatively located near modern Ag. Georgios, Plakias.
