= Psychium =

Town on the south coast of ancient Crete

Coordinates: 35°06′19″N 24°33′55″E

Psychium or Psychion (Ancient Greek: Ψύχιον), or Psycheium or Psycheion (Ψυχήιον), also known as Psychea (Ψύχεα or ψυχέα), was a town on the south coast of ancient Crete on a promontory of the same name. Ptolemy between the mouths of the rivers Massalia and Electra. According to the Stadiasmus Maris Magni, it had a harbour and was located on the south coast of Crete, 12 stadia west of Sulia and 150 stadia from Lamon.

The site of Psychium is located near modern Agios Pavlos, east of Cape Melissa.
