= Kazimierz Lejman =

Polish dermatologist

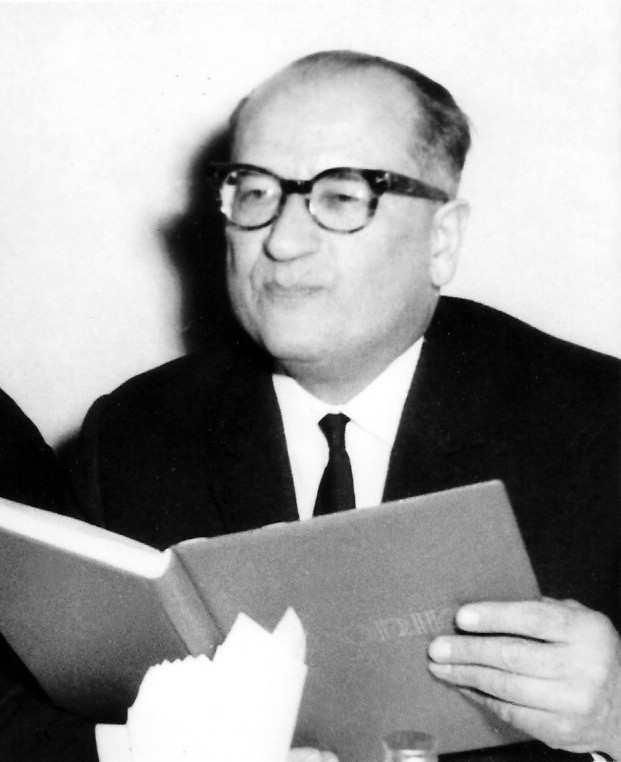
- Born: 1907
- Died: 1985 (aged 77–78)
- Education: Jagiellonian University
- Medical career
- Profession: Medical Doctor
- Field: Dermatology
- Institutions: Jagiellonian University Medical College
- Sub-specialties: Syphilology

Kazimierz Lejman (1907–1985) was a Polish dermatologist. He is credited with the histopathological description of late serpiginous syphilis.

== Biography ==
Lejman was educated at the Jagiellonian University Medical College. In 1938, he moved to Vilnius, where he worked at the University of Stefan Batory. In 1944 he returned to Kraków and, after the death of Professor Walter, became the Head of the Department of Dermatology at the Jagiellonian University Medical College. He was interested in culture, art and ancient religions of the East. He was painting, poetry, writing historical sketches. As a dermatologist was the author of works on syphilis and gonorrhea.
