= Warren Hastings (1802 EIC ship) =

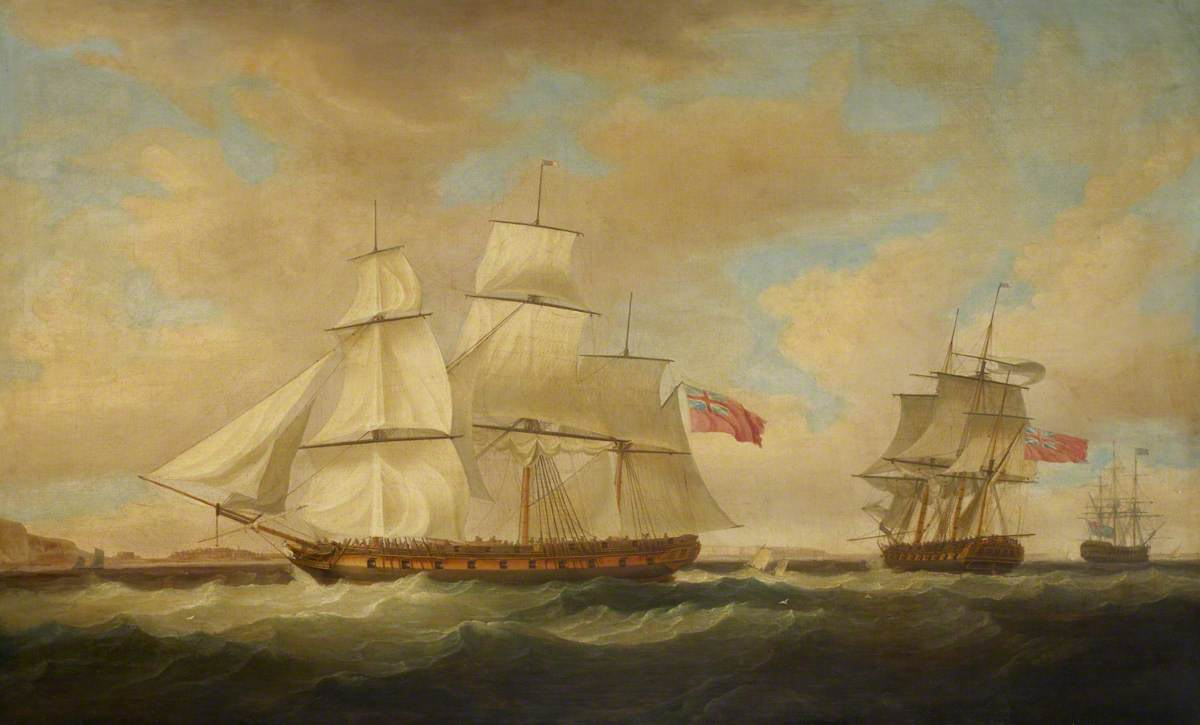
- Painting of Warren Hastings in two positions by Thomas Whitcombe

History

British East India Company
- Name: Warren Hastings
- Namesake: Warren Hastings
- Owner: John Pascal Larkins (1802–1805)
- Operator: East India Company
- Builder: Frances Barnard, Son & Roberts, Deptford
- Launched: 27 November 1802
- Captured: 21 June 1806

France
- Acquired: 11 June 1805 by capture
- Fate: Sold December 1806

Denmark-Norway
- Name: Holsten (II)
- Owner: Danish Asiatic Company (1806–1808)
- Acquired: December 1806 by purchase
- Captured: January 1808

United Kingdom
- Name: Warren Hastings
- Owner: John Pascal Larkins (c.1811–1812); William Sims (1812–1829)
- Acquired: January 1808 by capture and subsequent sale
- Fate: Broken up 1829

General characteristics
- Class & type: East Indiaman
- Tons burthen: 1200, or 1276, 1356, or 135618/94 (bm)
- Length: 165 ft 4 in (50.4 m) (overall), 133 ft 4 in (40.6 m) (keel)
- Beam: 42 ft 5 in (12.9 m)
- Depth of hold: 17 ft 1 in (5.2 m)
- Sail plan: Full-rigged ship
- Complement: 1803:135; At capture:138; 1811:135
- Armament: 1803:36 × 18-pounder guns; At capture: (Note: These figures are from the naval historian William James. He reported that four 18-pounder guns on the main deck and four 18-pounder carronades from the upper deck were stored in the hold.); Main deck: 26 × 18-pounder medium guns; Upper deck: 14 × 18-pounder carronades; Poop deck:4 × 12-pounder carronades; 1811:36 × 24&12-pounder guns

Warren Hastings was a three-decker East Indiaman, launched in 1802. The French captured her in 1805, during her second voyage for the East India Company and sold her to Danish owners. The British recaptured her in January 1808, and within a year thereafter she was again in her former owner's hands. She then made several more voyages for the company.

== Career ==
=== First EIC voyage (1803–1804) ===
Captain Thomas Larkins sailed Warren Hasting for China, leaving The Downs on 6 April 1803, and arriving at Whampoa on 28 August. Before she arrived she rescued a dozen or so Chinese sailors. A gale had caught their three "tchuans" and sunk them, causing the loss of some 500 people. The same gale had also caught the East Indiaman Houghton, causing her loss, together with that of the 120 or so people aboard her.

Larkins had left Britain during the Peace of Amiens so he did not apply for a letter of marque. However, the Peace broke down in May 1803. Larkins received a letter of marque on 16 September, while he was in China. Homeward bound, Warren Hastings crossed the Second Bar on 1 February 1804.

Warren Hastings was traveling in convoy with the fleet of East Indiamen returning from China, and under the command of Commodore Nathaniel Dance. On 14 February, the China fleet encountered a small French squadron under Contre-Admiral Charles-Alexandre Durand Linois. some shots were exchanged, but the East Indiamen were able to bluff Linois into withdrawing.

Warren Hastings was directly engaged and the Indiamen reached Malacca on 19 February and Penang on 1 March. Warren Hastings was at St Helena on 7 June and arrived at The Downs on 8 August.

=== Second EIC voyage and capture (1805) ===
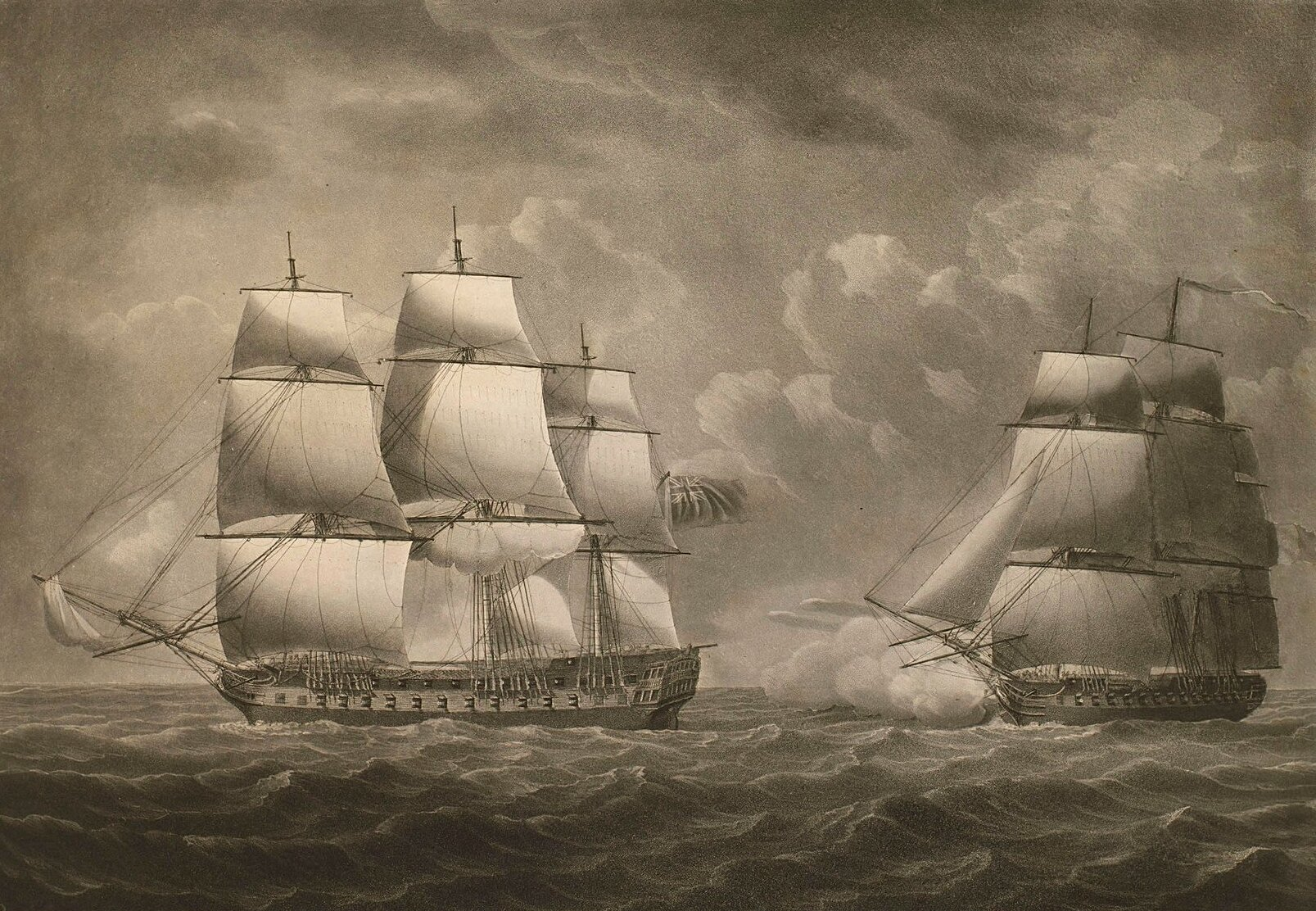
Engraving by Robert Dodd of Warren Hastings being captured by Piémontaise on 21 June 1806

Larkins sailed Warren Hastings for Benkulen and China on her second voyage, leaving Portsmouth on 17 February 1805. She spent May–July at St Helena and September–October at Benkulen. However, on 21 June 1806, as Warren Hastings was on her way back from Canton, the French frigate Piémontaise, under the command of Captain Épron, captured her at 26°13′S 56°45′E, in a noteworthy single-ship action. Larkins put up a stubborn resistance for four hours. Casualties on Warren Hastings from the engagement amounted to seven killed and 13 wounded; casualties on Piémontaise amounted to seven killed and five wounded. After Warren Hastings struck, the French boarding party stabbed Larkin, wounding him severely, and wounded four other officers and crew. (Note: On 7 January 1807, the Court of Directors of the EIC awarded 500 guineas to Larkins and 2000 guineas to his crew for their gallant defense.)

Her captors took Warren Hastings to Mauritius where they arrived on 4 July. Thereafter the French initially used her as a prison ship. (Note: The EIC valued her cargo at £104,051.)

On 11 December 1806, Warren Hastings was sold with "her tackle and apparel." The purchaser was a Danish company. One report has the Danish East India Company purchasing Warren Hastings as a replacement for Holstein, which had arrived at Port Louis on 21 July 1806, and been condemned. (A report in the Madras Courier dated 10 February 1807, stated that the Danish company's ship Holstein was sailing from Copenhagen to Serampore when she was dismasted off Ceylon. She sailed to Mauritius for repairs.)

The Danish Asiatic Company named their newly-bought ship Holsten (II). Reportedly she was wrecked in a cyclone at Bourbon Island towards end-December. It is clear that she was not totally wrecked as she returned to commerce.

=== Recapture (January 1808) and third EIC voyage (1809–1810) ===
The British recaptured Warren Hastings (plus six other Danish merchant ships), at Frederiksnagore (Surampore), then part of Danish India, and 14 miles north of Calcutta, after news of the British attack on Copenhagen in August–September 1807, reached India. Her captors placed Warren Hastings in the Indian coastal trade for some months until John Pascall Larkins, Jr., younger brother of Thomas Larkins, Jr., purchased her in 1809.

Captain C. P. MacFarlane sailed Warren Hastings back to England from Calcutta as an "extra ship", i.e., under charter. She left Calcutta on 11 September 1809, reached Madras on 24 September, and the Cape on 16 December. She was at St Helena on 27 January 1810 and arrived at Portsmouth on 8 April and Blackwall on 24 April.

=== Fourth EIC voyage (1811–1812) ===
Captain Gunter Lyde Browne sailed Warren Hastings to the Cape and China, leaving Portsmouth on 8 April 1811. He sailed under a letter of marque issued on 20 February 1811. She reached the Cape of Good Hope on 13 July, Penang on 30 August, and Malacca on 20 September, before arriving at Whampoa on 28 October. Homeward bound, she crossed the Second Bar on 11 January 1812, reached St Helena on 21 March, and arrived at The Downs on 14 May.

=== Fifth EIC voyage (1815–1816) ===
Captain Richard Rawes left The Downs on 27 April 1815, bound for China. Warren Hastings arrived at Whampoa on 23 September. Homeward bound, she crossed the Second Bar on 10 January 1816, reached St Helena on 26 March, and arrived at The Downs on 11 May. Rawes brought with him Wisteria sinensis (Chinese wisteria) plants. In addition to the wisteria, Rawes brought two Camellia hybrids for his relation Thomas Carey Palmer, of Bromley in Kent: "Wellbank's White Camellia" (Camellia japonica "Wellbankii") and Camellia × maliflora.

When Warren Hastings arrived back at London she discharged her crew, including her Chinese sailors hired in Canton. Princess Amelia repatriated 31 to Canton, together with 359 others, leaving the Downs on 20 July 1816.

=== Sixth EIC voyage (1819–1820) ===
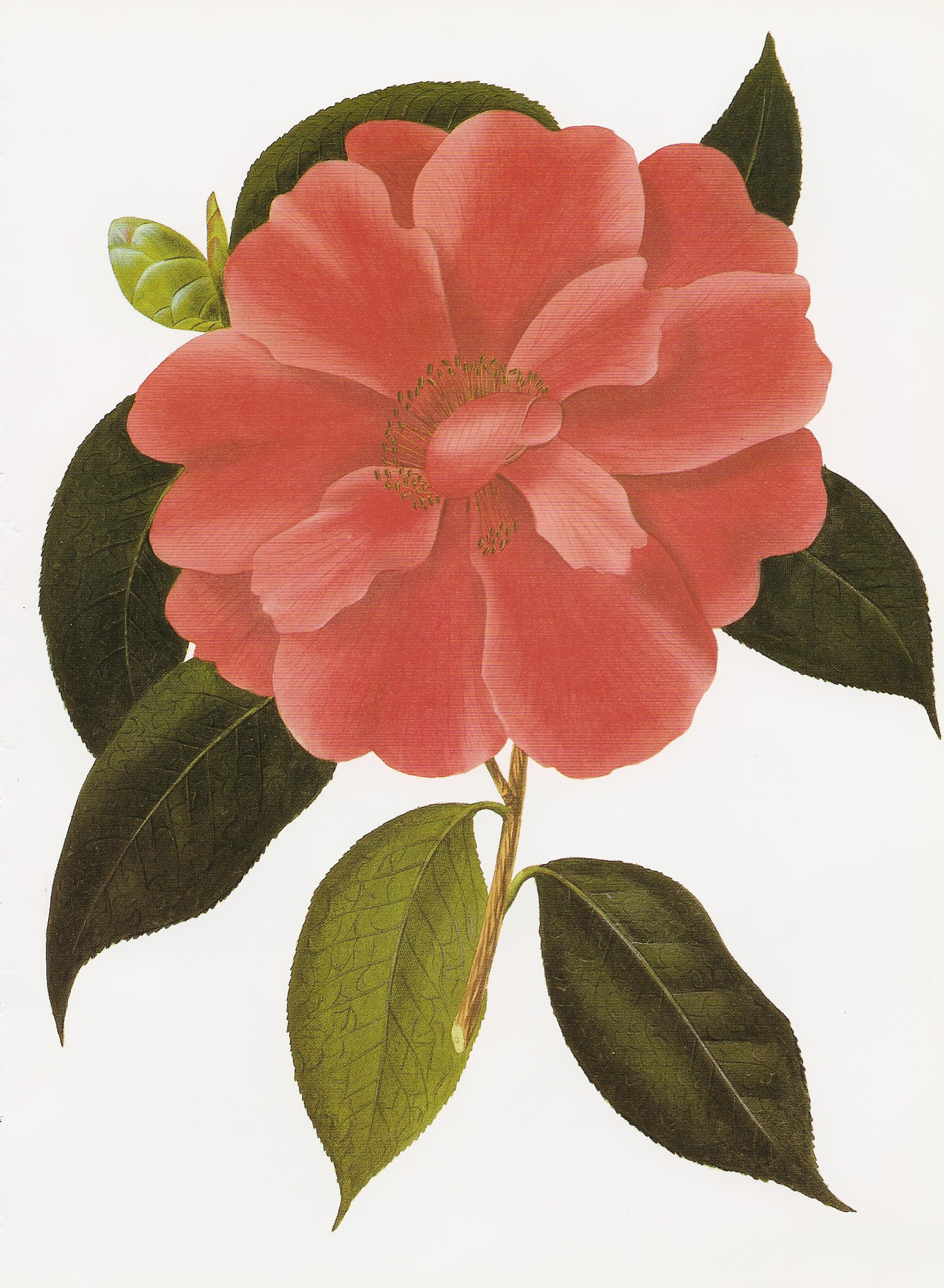
Camellia reticulata

Captain Rawes and Warren Hastings left Portsmouth on 4 April 1819, reached Penang on 20 July, Malacca on 15 September, and Singapore on ten days later. She arrived at Whampoa on 7 November. Homeward bound, she crossed the Second Bar on 6 February 1820, reached St Helena on 21 April, and arrived at The Downs on 20 June Downs.

Rawes brought with him Camellia reticulata plants, the first imported to England, the variety becoming known as 'Captain Rawes'. For over a century 'Captain Rawes' was the sole reticulata cultivated in Europe. Rawes also brought Palmer "Camellia sasanqua, var. β. stricata", "Paconia Moutan, var. Rawesii", and "Primula pranitens".

=== Seventh EIC voyage (1823–1824) ===
Warren Hastings, still under the command of Captain Richard Rawes, left the Downs on 21 April 1823 and arrived at Whampoa on 1 October. Homeward bound, she crossed the Second Bar on 17 January 1824, reached St Helena on 27 March, and arrived at The Downs on 10 June.

=== Eighth EIC voyage (1825–1826) ===
Captain Richard Rawes and Warren Hastings left The Downs on 1 May 1825. On the way, severe weather caused considerable damage, forcing Rawes to divert to Penang, which she reached on 27 August, for repairs. The repairs took some time long as Warren Hastings did not reach Singapore until 3 October. A cyclone on the way to China again caused damage, but she arrived at Whampoa on 6 November. Homeward bound, she crossed the Second Bar on 6 February 1826, reached St Helena on 3 May, and arrived at The Downs on 23 June.

== Fate ==
In 1829 Warren Hastings was sold for breaking up after having been laid up for some time.
