= William Layman =

British Royal Navy commander

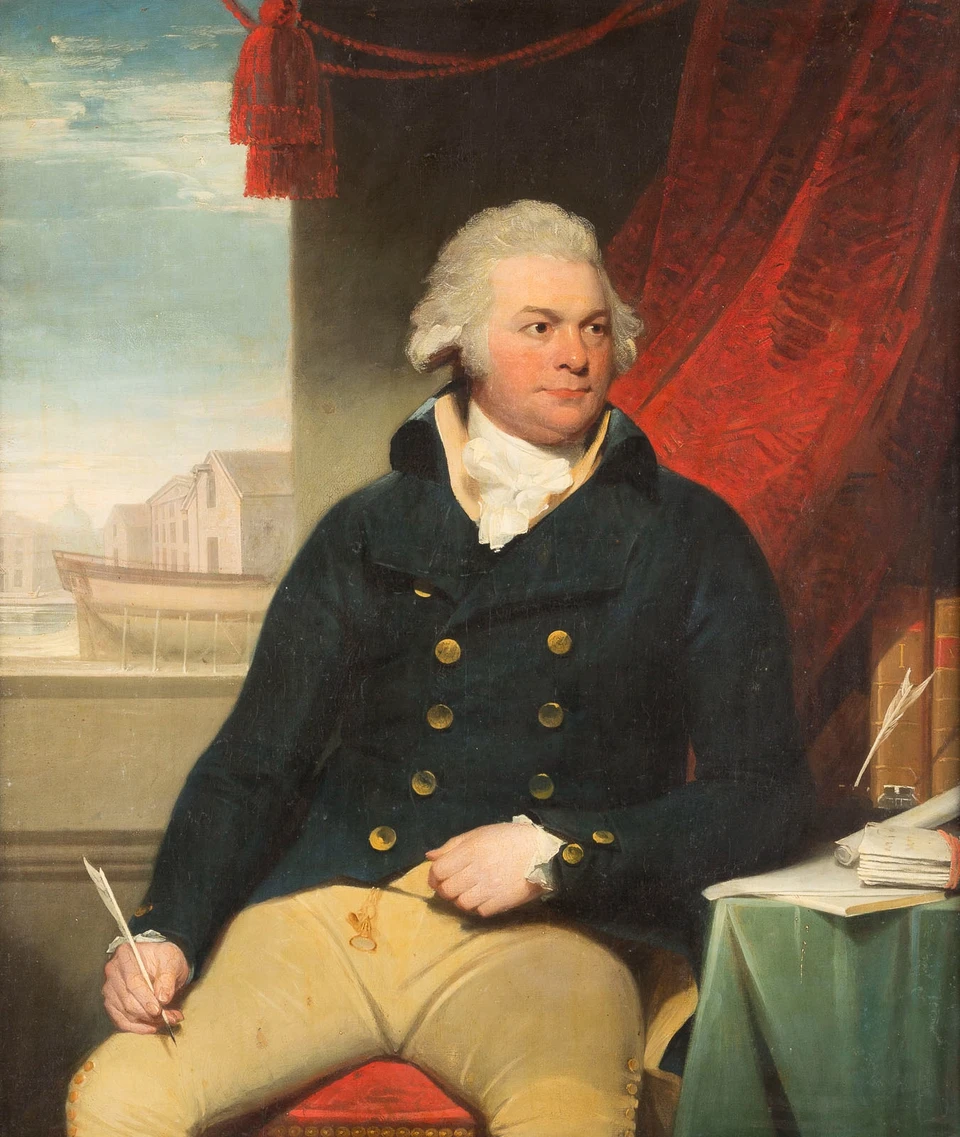
- Born: 1768
- Died: 1826 (aged 57–58)
- Occupation: Royal Navy commander

William Layman (1768–1826) was a British Royal Navy commander.

== Biography ==
Layman entered the navy in 1782 on board the Portland, served for four years (1782–6) in the Myrmidon on the home station, and a year and a half (1786–8) in the Amphion in the West Indies. He seems then to have gone into the merchant service, and was especially employed in the East India and China trade. In the end of 1796 he was for a few months in the Isis in the North Sea, and in 1800 returned definitely to the navy under the patronage of Lord St. Vincent. He passed his examination on 5 June 1800, when, according to his certificate, which agrees with other indications, he was thirty-two years of age. He served for a few weeks in the Royal George, St. Vincent's flagship, in the blockade of Brest, and was promoted to be lieutenant of the Formidable with Captain Thornbrough on 12 Sept. In December, at Lord Nelson's wish, he was appointed to the San Josef, and in February 1801 to the St. George. In the battle of Copenhagen he was lent to the Isis, in command of a party of men sent from the St. George. In April 1803 he again joined Nelson's flag in the Victory, remaining in her when Nelson went to the Mediterranean in the Amphion. When the Victory was afterwards on her passage out she recaptured the Ambuscade, which had been taken by the Bayonnaise in 1798. Layman, with a prize crew, was sent on board to take her to Gibraltar, where she arrived with a French merchant ship which she captured on the way. This merchantman was, in the first instance, condemned as a prize of the Victory, but the judgment was reversed, and having been captured by a non-commissioned ship she was eventually condemned as a droit of admiralty (Nicolas, vi. 40).

In October 1803 Layman was appointed to command the Weasel, a small vessel employed for the protection of trade in the traits of Gibraltar. In the following March the Weasel was lost on Cabrita Point in a fog. Mainly in consequence of the representations of the merchants of Gibraltar, warmly backed up by Nelson, Layman was nevertheless promoted to the rank of commander on 8 May 1804, and appointed a few months later to the Raven sloop, in which he sailed on 21 January 1805, with despatches for Sir John Orde and Nelson. On the evening of the 28th he arrived at Orde's rendezvous off Cadiz, and, not seeing the squadron, lay to for the night, during which the ship was allowed to drift inside the Spanish squadron in the outer road of Cadiz. Layman's position thus became almost hopeless, and the next morning in trying to escape the ship was driven ashore near Fort Sta. Catalina; the men escaped to the shore with very little loss. Layman, in his report to Nelson, attributed the disaster to the neglect of the officer of the watch. Nelson had a high opinion of Layman's abilities, but not of his discretion; on a former occasion he had written : 'His tongue runs too fast; I often tell him neither to talk nor write so much.' and he now seems to have repeated the caution, warning him against making serious charges without certain proof. Layman, however, understood Nelson to advise the suppression of his account of the accident, or rather the rewriting of it, particularly omitting 'that part relative to the misbehaviour of the officer of the watch, who will be sentenced to death if the narrative, worded as it is at present, is laid before the court.' The court-martial found Layman guilty of want of care in approaching the land, and sentenced him to be severely reprimanded and to be put to the bottom of the list, with seniority 9 March 1805, the date of the trial.

Nelson afterwards wrote very strongly in Layman's favour, both to the first lord of the admiralty and to the secretary, and spoke of him in very high terms to his friend Davison (ib. pp. 352–5). It is probable that if Nelson had lived, or Lord Melville continued in office, Layman might have had further employment. The remainder of his life seems to have been chiefly devoted to offering suggestions to the admiralty, which, on their part, were coldly acknowledged, and to publishing pamphlets on nautical or naval subjects.

The following are among the most important:

- 'Outline of a Plan for the better Cultivation ... of the British West Indies, being the original suggestion for providing an effectual substitute for the African Slave-trade . . .' (8vo, 94 pp. 1807). The 'effectual substitute' proposed is the importation of Chinese coolies; he writes, he says, from 'many years' personal observation in the East and West Indies, and in China.'
- 'Precursor to an Exposé on Foreign Trees and Timber ... as connected with the maritime strength and prosperity of the United Kingdom' (8vo, 1813). The copy in the British Museum (16275) has numerous marginal notes, apparently in Layman's handwriting.
- 'The Pioneer, or Strictures on Maritime Strength and Economy' (8vo, 96 pp. 1821), in three parts: the first an interesting and sensible essay on the condition of British seamen and impressment; the second a proposed method for preserving timber from dry-rot; and the third the syllabus of a contemplated maritime history from the earliest times (including the building, plans, and navigation of the ark, with notes on the weather experienced) to the termination of the second American war. Perhaps the syllabus may be considered as indicating even then an aberration of the intellect which caused him to 'terminate his existence' in 1826.

== Marriage ==
William Layman married Elizabeth Perry, eldest daughter of John Perry (shipbuilder) founder of the Blackwall Yard, at St Dunstan's, Stepney on 8 December 1798.
