= Worm (artillery) =

Artillery maintenance device

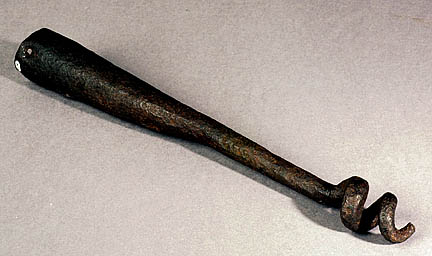
The tip of a US Revolutionary Artillery Worm

A worm is a device used to remove unspent powder bag remnants from a cannon or other piece of muzzle-loading field artillery. It usually took the form of a double or triple corkscrew-shaped piece of iron on the end of a long pole that could be twisted down the barrel to pick up any debris left over from the previous firing of the weapon or used to extract a misfired charge. It was usually turned twice before being pulled out.

As used during the American Civil War, the worm was either on its own pole hanging from the artillery carriage or attached to the end of the sponge.
