= Lamon (name) =

Lamon is both a surname and a given name. Some notable people with the name include:

- Francesco Lamon (born 1994), Italian track and road cyclist
- Georgie Lamon (1934–2016), Swiss politician
- Isabel Lamon (1898–1958), American actress in silent films
- Jeanne Lamon (1949–2021), Canadian violinist
- Laurie Lamon (born 1956), American poet
- Nicola Lamon (born 1979), Italian harpsichordist and organist
- Sophie Lamon (born 1985), Swiss Olympic fencer
- Ward Hill Lamon (1828–1893), American lawyer
- Lamon Brewster (born 1973), American heavyweight
- Lamon Archey (born 1981), American actor
