= List of shipwrecks in December 1846 =

The list of shipwrecks in December 1846 includes ships sunk, foundered, wrecked, grounded, or otherwise lost during December 1846.

== 1 December ==
List of shipwrecks: 1 December 1846
Ship	State	Description
Anna	United Kingdom	The ship ran aground on the Cockle Sand, in the North Sea off the coast of Norfolk. She was on a voyage from Arbroath, Forfarshire to London. She was refloated and taken in to Great Yarmouth in a leaky condition.
Kleine Edmond	Netherlands	The ship was driven ashore on "Carlos Island", Russia. She was on a voyage from Riga to a Dutch port. She was refloated.
Panther	United Kingdom	The ship was driven ashore in Bootle Bay. She was on a voyage from Liverpool, Lancashire to Alexandria, Egypt. She was refloated.
Thomas	United Kingdom	The ship was driven ashore and wrecked at St. Ives, Cornwall. Her crew were rescued.

== 2 December ==
List of shipwrecks: 2 December 1846
Ship	State	Description
Ann	United Kingdom	The brig was wrecked on the Chassiron Rocks, at the mouth of the Charente. Her crew were rescued. She was on voyage from Sunderland, County Durham, to the Charente.
Esperance	France	The ship ran aground on the Haisborough Sands, in the North Sea off the coast of Norfolk and was abandoned. Her crew were rescued by Queen Victoria (United Kingdom). She was on a voyage from Hartlepool, County Durham, United Kingdom to Dunkirk, Nord.
Sarah Ann	United Kingdom	The schooner was wrecked near West Quoddy, Nova Scotia, British North America. She was on a voyage from Boston, Lincolnshire to Cumberland, Nova Scotia.
Southern	United Kingdom	The ship was driven ashore in Bootle Bay. She was on a voyage from Alexandria, Egypt to Liverpool, Lancashire. She was refloated.

== 3 December ==
List of shipwrecks: 3 December 1846
Ship	State	Description
Alexander	United Kingdom	The ship was driven ashore at Landskrona, Sweden. She was refloated on 5 December and resumed her voyage.
Ebony	(United Kingdom of Great Britain and Ireland) British North America	The ship was abandoned in the Atlantic Ocean. Her crew were rescued by Isaac Newton John Baring (both United Kingdom). Ebony was on a voyage from Port Medway, Nova Scotia to Demerara, British Guiana.
John Milligan	United Kingdom	The ship ran aground and sank at Douglas, Isle of Man. She was on a voyage from Maryport, Cumberland. She was refloated on 10 December.
Margaret	United Kingdom	The ship ran aground and was wrecked on the East Gar Sand, in the North Sea off the coast of Yorkshire. Her crew were rescued. She was on a voyage from Middlesbrough, Yorkshire to Leith, Lothian.
Maria	United Kingdom	The ship was driven ashore and damaged west of Wells-next-the-Sea, Norfolk. She was on a voyage from Newcastle upon Tyne, Northumberland to Rye, Sussex. She was refloated and taken in to Wells-next-the-Sea.
Rosetta	United Kingdom	The brig ran aground on the Haisborough Sands, in the North Sea off the coast of Norfolk and was damaged. She was refloated and consequently put in to Great Yarmouth in a leaky condition.

== 4 December ==
List of shipwrecks: 4 December 1846
Ship	State	Description
Chichester	United Kingdom	The ship ran aground on the Kentish Knock. She was on a voyage from Hartlepool, County Durham to Chichester, Sussex. She was refloated and taken in to Dover, Kent in a leaky condition.
Navigator	United Kingdom	The ship was wrecked in Hermitage Bay. She was on a voyage from Quebec City, Province of Canada, British North America to Sunderland, County Durham.

== 5 December ==
List of shipwrecks: 5 December 1846
Ship	State	Description
Adventurer	United Kingdom	The ship was wrecked in the Magdalen Islands, Nova Scotia, British North America. She was on a voyage from Prince Edward Island, British North America to Liverpool, Lancashire.
Brothers	United Kingdom	The Thames barge collided with the brig Sally (United Kingdom) and sank at Faversham, Kent. She was refloated and found to be severely damaged.
Caroline	Norway	The ship was driven ashore at Moss. She was refloated.
Navigateur	Hamburg	The ship ran aground on the East Reef, off "Corsoer", Denmark. She was on a voyage from "Mollerup", Denmark to London, United Kingdom.
Otto	Stralsund	The ship was driven ashore by ice on the coast of Prussia and was abandoned by her crew. She was on a voyage from Newcastle upon Tyne, Northumberland, United Kingdom to Stralsund. She was refloated and taken in to Greifswald.
Pet	United Kingdom	The ship caught fire in Bridlington Bay and was severely damaged. She put in to Whitby, Yorkshire.
Samuel	United States	The schooner ran aground and capsized between Harfleur, Seine-Inférieure and Honfleur, Calvados, France with the loss of two of her crew. She was on a voyage from London to Rouen, Seine-Inférieure, France.
Shannon	United Kingdom	The steamship caught fire and was scuttled at Plymouth, Devon. All on board were rescued. She was on a voyage from London to Dublin.

== 6 December ==
List of shipwrecks: 6 December 1846
Ship	State	Description
Ajax	Flag unknown	The ship collided with Cacique (French Navy) and sank in the Atlantic Ocean off Cape St. Vincent, Portugal with the loss of two of her crew.
Baltic	United Kingdom	The ship collided with Matthew Pearce (United Kingdom) and sank in the Atlantic Ocean (35°36′N 68°12′W).
Billow	United Kingdom	The schooner ran aground on the Herd Sand, in the North Sea off the coast of County Durham. Her crew were rescued by the North Shields Lifeboat. She was on a voyage from Queensferry to South Shields, County Durham. She was refloated on 21 December.
Clunie	United Kingdom	The ship ran aground on the Herd Sand. Her crew were rescued by the North Shields Lifeboat. She was on a voyage from South Shields to Aberdeen. She was refloated on 8 December and beached at South Shields.
Diana	Hamburg	The ship was wrecked off Skagen, Denmark. Her crew were rescued. She was on a voyage from Königsberg, Prussia to Aberdeen.
James	United Kingdom	The sloop ran aground on the Herd Sand. Her crew were rescued by the North Shields Lifeboat. She was on a voyage from South Shields to Dundee, Forfarshire. She caught fire and was burnt out. The wreck was refloated on 21 December.
Lark	United Kingdom	The ship was lost off Halifax, Nova Scotia.
Malvina	United Kingdom	The ship was driven ashore at Figueira da Foz, Portugal. She was on a voyage from Figueira da Foz to Newfoundland, British North America.
Mary	(United Kingdom of Great Britain and Ireland) Jamaica	The shallop was wrecked on a reef off Savanna-la-Mar.
River Chief	(United Kingdom of Great Britain and Ireland) Swan River Colony	The ship was wrecked in Geographe Bay. She was on a voyage from the Swan River to Launceston, Van Diemen's Land.
Tom and Mary	United Kingdom	The ship was driven ashore near Port Talbot, Glamorgan. She was on a voyage from Jersey, Channel Islands to Swansea, Glamorgan. She was refloated on 20 December and taken in to Port Talbot.

== 7 December ==
List of shipwrecks: 7 December 1846
Ship	State	Description
Bluebell	United Kingdom	The ship departed from Viana do Castelo, Portugal for Cork. No further trace, presumed foundered in the Atlantic Ocean with the loss of all hands.
Cerus	United Kingdom	The ship was wrecked in the Gut of Canso. She was on a voyage from Charlottetown, Prince Edward Island, British North America to Sunderland, County Durham.
Concord	Danzig	The ship was wrecked at "Stevens". Her crew were rescued. She was on a voyage from Danzig to Le Havre, Seine-Inférieure, France.
St. Jean	France	The ship was driven ashore and wrecked at Birchington, Kent, United Kingdom. Her crew were rescued. She was on a voyage from London, United Kingdom to Gravelines, Nord.

== 8 December ==
List of shipwrecks: 8 December 1846
Ship	State	Description
Activ	Kingdom of Hanover	The ship was abandoned in the North Sea off Heligoland. Her crew were rescued by Maria (Hamburg). Activ was on a voyage from Brake to Stavanger, Norway.
Edwin	United States	The ship was driven ashore on the South West Spit. She was on a voyage from Saint Petersburg, Russia to New York. She had been refloated and towed in to New York by 19 December.
Hope	United Kingdom	The ship ran aground on the Rusk Bank, in the Irish Sea off the coast of County Wexford. She was on a voyage from Patagonia, Argentina to Liverpool, Lancashire. Hope was refloated on 10 December but was consequently abandoned. Eleven of her 27 crew were rescued by Liberator (United Kingdom. The longboat containing the remaining sixteen came ashore near Padstow, Cornwall on 13 December. Only six men survived. Hope was subsequently driven ashore at Wexford. Also reported as having been on fire and sinking on the Bass Bank.
Robert	United Kingdom	The ship was abandoned in the Atlantic Ocean. Her crew were rescued. She was on a voyage from Bombay, India to London.
USS Somers	United States Navy	USS Somers. Mexican-American War:The brig capsized in a sudden squall while chasing a blockade runner off Veracruz, Mexico with the loss of 32 killed and 7 captured of her 80 crew.

== 9 December ==
List of shipwrecks: 9 December 1846
Ship	State	Description
Ceres	Lübeck	The ship was driven ashore and sank at Reval, Russia. She was on a voyage from Lübeck to Reval.
Fortuna	Norway	The jacht was wrecked near Christiansand. Her crew were rescued. She was on a voyage from Newcastle upon Tyne, Northumberland, United Kingdom to Christiansand.
Hampshire	United Kingdom	The barque capsized and sank at Portsmouth, Hampshire. She was refloated on 17 December.
Italein	Stettin	The ship was driven ashore near the Nakkehead Lighthouse, Denmark. She was on a voyage from Hartlepool, County Durham, United Kingdom to Stettin. She was refloated the next day and resumed her voyage.
Lady Sarah Maitland	(United Kingdom of Great Britain and Ireland) British North America	The ship was driven ashore at LaHave, Nova Scotia. She was on a voyage from Cienfuegos, Cuba to Halifax, Nova Scotia. She was refloated.

== 10 December ==
List of shipwrecks: 10 December 1846
Ship	State	Description
Alexander	Greece	The brig was driven ashore and wrecked at Genoa, Kingdom of Sardinia.
Auchintorlie	United Kingdom	The ship was lost off Rathlin Island, County Donegal. Her crew were rescued.
Belvoir Castle	United Kingdom	The ship was driven ashore at Maryport, Cumberland. She was on a voyage from Dublin to Maryport. She was refloated on 14 December.
Creole	United States	The barque-rigged steamship was wrecked at Nuevitas, Cuba with the loss of 43 lives. There were more than 102 survivors She was on a voyage from Bordeaux, Gironde, France to New Orleans, Louisiana.
Duke of Cornwall	United Kingdom	The ship departed from Ardrossan, Ayrshire for Saint John, New Brunswick, British North America. No further trace, presumed foundered with the loss of all hands.
Indiano	Flag unknown	The ship was wrecked on the Goodwin Sands, Kent, United Kingdom. Her crew were rescued. She was on a voyage from Amsterdam, North Holland, Netherlands to Trieste.
James	United Kingdom	The sloop was driven ashore in Mulroy Bay with the loss of four of her crew. She was on a voyage from Inverness to Liverpool, Lancashire.
Mary	United Kingdom	The ship was driven ashore and wrecked at Killespey Point, County Sligo. She was on a voyage from Sligo to Liverpool.
Navy	United Kingdom	The ship ran aground on the Vestre Hage, off Dragør, Denmark. She was on a voyage from Stettin to London. She was refloated on 14 December and taken in to Copenhagen.
Peggy	United Kingdom	The ship sprang a leak in the North Sea. She was beached at Runswick, Yorkshire, where she was wrecked.
Thomas	United Kingdom	The ship was driven ashore and wrecked at St. Ives, Cornwall. Her crew were rescued.

== 11 December ==
List of shipwrecks: 11 December 1846
Ship	State	Description
Agenoria	United Kingdom	The ship was driven ashore at Hartlepool, County Durham. She was consequently condemned.
Friends	United Kingdom	The ship was driven ashore at Herne Bay, Kent. She was on a voyage from Saguenay, Province of Canada, British North America to London. She was refloated on 14 December and resumed her voyage.
John	United Kingdom	The ship was wrecked on the Goodwin Sands, Kent. Her crew were rescued. She was on a voyage from South Shields, County Durham to Dunkirk, Nord.
John	United Kingdom	The schooner was in collision with the brig Wave (United Kingdom) and foundered in the English Channel off Folkestone, Kent. Her crew were rescued. She was on a voyage from Blakeney, Norfolk to Newhaven, Sussex.
Mary Roberts	United Kingdom	The ship ran aground and sank off Block House Point, Pembrokeshire. Her crew were rescued. She was on a voyage from Cork to Milford Haven, Pembrokeshire.

== 12 December ==
List of shipwrecks: 12 December 1846
Ship	State	Description
Alert	United Kingdom	The brig was lost in the Old Bahama Channel, off the coast of Cuba. Her crew were rescued. She was on a voyage from Liverpool, Lancashire to Havana, Cuba.
Courier	(Ottoman Empire) Cyprus	The ship was wrecked at Portoferraio, Grand Duchy of Tuscany. Her crew were rescued.
Emerald	United Kingdom	The ship was wrecked on Bornholm, Denmark with the loss of all hands. She was on a voyage from Riga, Russia to Newry, County Antrim.
General von Thom	Russia	The schooner was driven ashore near Copenhagen, Denmark. She was on a voyage from Newcastle upon Tyne, Northumberland, United Kingdom to Stralsund. She floated off but consequently sank. She was refloated and taken in to Copenhagen.
Gustave Wilhelm	Sweden	The sloop was lost near Malmö with the loss of all hands.
Johanna Maria	Flag unknown	The ship was driven ashore near "Freidrichsort". Her crew were rescued.
Marquis of Lorn	United Kingdom	The ship ran aground at St. Ives, Cornwall. She was refloated on 16 December and taken in to Hayle, Cornwall.
Mary Roberts	United Kingdom	The ship was driven ashore and sunk at Blockhouse Point, Pembrokeshire. Her crew were rescued. She was on a voyage from Cork to Milford Haven, Pembrokeshire.
Victoria Eugenie	France	The schooner was driven ashore and sank 4 nautical miles (7.4 km) west of Dunkirk, Nord. Her crew were rescued. She was on a voyage from Dunkirk to Newcastle upon Tyne.

== 13 December ==
List of shipwrecks: 16 December 1846
Ship	State	Description
Amanda	Hamburg	The ship was driven ashore at Cuxhaven. She was on a voyage from Hull, Yorkshire, United Kingdom to Hamburg. She was refloated on 15 December and taken in to Hamburg.
Animandus	Hamburg	The ship was driven ashore at Cuxhaven. She was on a voyage from Hull, Yorkshire, United Kingdom to Hamburg.
Berceau	French Navy	The Cornaline-class corvette was wrecked in a hurricane at Saint-Denis, Réunion with the loss of all hands.
Dwina	United Kingdom	The ship ran aground on the Gunfleet Sand, in the North Sea off the coast of Essex. She was on a voyage from Riga, Russia to London. She was refloated the next day.
Ellen	(United Kingdom of Great Britain and Ireland) British North America	The schooner was abandoned in the Atlantic Ocean (32°20′N 53°50′W). Her crew were rescued by Swallow (United Kingdom). Ellen was on a voyage from Yarmouth, Nova Scotia to Barbados.
L'Amoraal Ulbe	Netherlands	The ship was wrecked on the Heider, in the North Sea off the coast of Zeeland. Her crew were rescued. She was on a voyage from Liverpool, Lancashire, United Kingdom to Rotterdam, South Holland.
Talmodigheden	Norway	The ship was lost near the mouth of the Mazaro, Sicily. Her crew were rescued. She was on a voyage from Cette, Hérault, France to Buccari, Kingdom of Croatia.
Vancouver	United Kingdom	The ship ran aground on the Nantucket Shoal in the Atlantic Ocean off the coast of Massachusetts, United States. Her crew were rescued by Coquimbo (United States). Vancouver was on a voyage from London to Saint John, New Brunswick, British North America.

== 14 December ==
List of shipwrecks: 14 December 1846
Ship	State	Description
Alicia	United Kingdom	The ship was abandoned in the Atlantic Ocean. Her crew were rescued by Sophia (United Kingdom). Alicia was on a voyage from Milltown, Cornwall to Liverpool.
Defiance	United Kingdom	The ship was abandoned in the Atlantic Ocean. Her crew were rescued by Washington Irvine (United States). Defiance was on a voyage from Pictou, Nova Scotia, British North America to Boston, Massachusetts, United States.
Elbe	France	The ship was driven ashore at Oristano, Sardinia. Her crew were rescued.
Rappahannock	United States	The ship ran aground at New York. She was on a voyage from New York to Liverpool, Lancashire, United Kingdom. She was refloated.
Rebecca	United Kingdom	The ship was abandoned in the Atlantic Ocean off the Isles of Scilly. Her crew were rescued by Budman (United Kingdom). Rebecca was on a voyage from Milltown to Liverpool.

== 15 December ==
List of shipwrecks: 15 December 1846
Ship	State	Description
Brothers	(United Kingdom of Great Britain and Ireland) British North America	The schooner was abandoned in the Atlantic Ocean Her crew were rescued by Noble (United Kingdom).
Georgine Maria	Bremen	The ship was driven ashore in the Weser downstream of Großersiel, Kingdom of Hanover.
Twa Pogkar	Sweden	The schooner was wrecked on the Lang Luitgen Sand, in the North Sea and was abandoned by her crew. She was on a voyage from Stockholm to Bremen.

== 16 December ==
List of shipwrecks: 16 December 1846
Ship	State	Description
Baretta	France	The ship was lost off the "Island of Magdalene". Her crew were rescued.
Canning	United Kingdom	The brig was destroyed by fire in the Strait of Magellan with the loss of three of her crew. She was on a voyage from Arica, Chile to London.
Cinderella	United Kingdom	The ship was driven ashore at Point Hel, Prussia. She was on a voyage from Danzig to London. She was refloated on 1 January 1847 and put back to Danzig.
Dart	United Kingdom	The schooner departed from Terceira Island, Azores for Liverpool, Lancashire. No further trace, presumed foundered with the loss of all hands.
Duke of Cornwall	United Kingdom	The ship departed from Ardrossan, Ayrshire for Saint John, New Brunswick, British North America. No further trace, presumed foundered with the loss of all hands.
Eliza	United Kingdom	The ship ran aground off Thornham, Norfolk and was damaged.
Empress	United Kingdom	The ship caught fire and was scuttled at Cork. She was refloated on 18 December.
George	United Kingdom	The ship was wrecked near St. Govan's Head, Pembrokeshire. Her crew were rescued. She was on a voyage from Newport, Monmouthshire to London.
Grecia	Greece	The ship was wrecked on the north coast of "Cervi Island". Her crew were rescued. She was on a voyage from Syros to Malta.
Ida Margaretha	Kingdom of Hanover	The sloop was driven ashore by ice in the Elbe.
Orwell	United Kingdom	The ship ran aground on the Woolpack Sand, in the North Sea off the coast of Norfolk. Her crew were rescued with the exception of one man who refused to leave.
USS Union	United States Navy	The schooner was wrecked off Veracruz, Mexico.
Vrow Antje	Hamburg	The ship was wrecked near Isigny-sur-Mer, Calvados, France. She was on a voyage from Hamburg to Rouen, Seine-Inférieure, France.
Wellington	Netherlands	The ship was driven ashore and wrecked in the Dardanelles.
Zebra	United Kingdom	The ship was wrecked on The Skerries, off the coast of Anglesey. Her crew were rescued. She was on a voyage from Liverpool to Galway.

== 17 December ==
List of shipwrecks: 17 December 1846
Ship	State	Description
Cyrus	United Kingdom	The ship was wrecked at the entrance to the Gut of Canso. She was on a voyage from Charlottetown, Prince Edward Island, British North America to Sunderland, County Durham.
Fawn	United Kingdom	The ship was driven ashore at Sunderland. She was refloated on 19 December and taken in to Sunderland.
Isabella	(United Kingdom of Great Britain and Ireland) British North America	The ship was driven ashore on the coast of Nova Scotia. She was on a voyage from Antigua to Brier Island, Nova Scotia. She was refloated and put in to Sheet Harbour, Nova Scotia.
Jane	United Kingdom	The ship was driven ashore and severely damaged at North Shields, County Durham. She was on a voyage from Liverpool, Lancashire to Newcastle upon Tyne, Northumberland.
Ocean Queen	United Kingdom	The brig was driven ashore at Lewes, Delaware, United States. She was on a voyage from the West Indies to New York, United States. She was refloated in mid-March.
Old Rapp	United Kingdom	The ship ran aground on the Owers Sandbank. She was on a voyage from America to Hull. She was refloated on 20 December and resumed her voyage.
Walter	United Kingdom	The ship was driven ashore near Ramsgate, Kent. She was onh a voyage from London to Falmouth, Cornwall. She was refloated on 19 December and taken in to Ramsgate.

== 18 December ==
List of shipwrecks: 18 December 1846
Ship	State	Description
Barbara	United Kingdom	The ship was driven ashore near Castletown, Isle of Man. She was refloated and taken in to Castletown.
Calcutta	(United Kingdom of Great Britain and Ireland) British North America	The ship was abandoned in the Atlantic Ocean. Her crew were rescued by Terra Nova (United Kingdom). Calcutta was on a voyage from Quebec City, Province of Canada, British North America to London.
Fanny	United Kingdom	The schooner was driven ashore 2 nautical miles (3.7 km) north of Ayr. She was on a voyage from Belfast, County Antrim to Ayr.
Francis	United Kingdom	The ship was driven ashore and abandoned at Ventava, Courland Governorate. She was on a voyage from Kirkcaldy, Fife to Ventspils. She was refloated on 23 December and taken in to Ventspils.
Globe	United Kingdom	The collier, a schooner, collided with the collier George (United Kingdom) and foundered in the North Sea off Whitby, Yorkshire. Her crew were rescued by George. Globe was on a voyage from Middlesbrough, Yorkshire to Shoreham-by-Sea, Sussex.
Minerva	(United Kingdom of Great Britain and Ireland) Isle of Man	The ship was wrecked at Kirksanton, Cumberland with the loss of both crew. She was on a voyage from Liverpool, Lancashire to an Irish port.
Trent	United Kingdom	The ship was driven ashore and wrecked at Scarborough, Yorkshire, She was on a voyage from King's Lynn, Norfolk to Sunderland, County Durham.

== 19 December ==
List of shipwrecks: 19 December 1846
Ship	State	Description
Antelope	Bremen	The brig was wrecked at the White Cliffs, in the Dardanelles. Her crew survived.
Bloomfield	(United Kingdom of Great Britain and Ireland) British North America	The brig was driven ashore at Hampstead, New York, United States. She was on a voyage from Sydney, Nova Scotia to New York City.
Britannia	(United Kingdom of Great Britain and Ireland) British North America	The ship was wrecked at Yarmouth, Nova Scotia. She was on a voyage from Saint Thomas, Virgin Islands to Yarmouth.
Direction	Russia	The ship was driven ashore in the Gut of Tackerort. She was on a voyage from Cette, Hérault, France to Riga.
England	United Kingdom	The ship was wrecked near Saint John, New Brunswick, British North America with the loss of four of her crew. She was on a voyage from London to Saint John.
Fairy	United Kingdom	The ship was abandoned in the North Sea off the coast of the Lemon and Owers Sand. Her crew were rescued. She came ashore on Texel, North Holland, Netherlands on 23 December.
Frau Etta	Kingdom of Hanover	The ship was wrecked on Wangeroog. Her crew were rescued. She was on a voyage from London, United Kingdom to Emden.
Lennan	United Kingdom	The ship ran aground off Blackpool, Lancashire. She was consequently beached at Lytham St. Annes. She was on a voyage from Liverpool to Ballina, County Mayo.
Macao	United Kingdom	The ship was driven ashore at Kilmore, County Wexford. She was on a voyage from New York, United States to Belfast, County Antrim.
Maria Anna	Netherlands	The ship was driven ashore near Ventava, Courland Governorate. Her crew were rescued. She was on a voyage from Ventava to Amsterdam, North Holland.
Romance	United Kingdom	The ship was driven ashore at Barber's Point, Ottoman Empire, in the Dardanelles. She was refloated on 23 December.
Romulus	United Kingdom	The ship ran aground on the Drummore Bank. She was on a voyage from Waterford to the Clyde.
Tritonia	United Kingdom	The ship was driven ashore at Blakeney, Norfolk and was abandoned by her crew. She was on a voyage from Brixham, Devon to Wells-next-the-Sea, Norfolk.

== 20 December ==
List of shipwrecks: 20 December 1846
Ship	State	Description
Conqueror	United Kingdom	The steam tug was destroyed by fire.
Esterlinda	(United Kingdom of Great Britain and Ireland) Jamaica	The ship was wrecked off Monkey Point, Nicaragua, Her crew were rescued.
Godofredus	Flag unknown	The ship was driven ashore 3 nautical miles (5.6 km) from Gioia Tauro Kingdom of the Two Sicilies. She was on a voyage from Newcastle upon Tyne, Northumberland, United Kingdom to Messina, Sicily.
Seaflower	United Kingdom	The ship was driven ashore near Hull, Yorkshire. Her crew were rescued. She was on a voyage from Liverpool, Lancashire to Newcastle upon Tyne, Northumberland.
Sophia	Netherlands	The schooner was holed by her anchor and sank at the mouth of the Courantyne River.
Zephyr	United Kingdom	The schooner was driven ashore on the Isle of May, Fife. She was on a voyage from Pillau, Prussia to Dundee, Forfarshire. She floated off and came ashore at Crail, Fife.

== 21 December ==
List of shipwrecks: 21 December 1846
Ship	State	Description
Flandre	Belgium	The ship foundered in the English Channel off Start Point, Devon. She was on a voyage from Le Havre, Seine-Inférieure, France to Île Bourbon.
Johanna	Flag unknown	The ship was driven ashore and wrecked near Libava, Courland Governorate. She was on a voyage from Saint Petersburg to Liepāja.
Lovely	France	The ship was wrecked near Vannes, Morbihan.
Macao	United Kingdom	The ship was driven ashore near Wexford. She was on a voyage from New York, United States to Belfast, County Antrim.
Majestic	United Kingdom	The brig ran aground and was wrecked on the Herd Sand, in the North Sea off the coast of County Durham. Her crew were rescued by the North Shields Lifeboat. She was on a voyage from Liverpool, Lancashire to Newcastle upon Tyne, Northumberland. She was refloated on 1 January but subsequently capsized.
Margate	United Kingdom	The ship was driven ashore and wrecked at Flamborough Head, Yorkshire.
Maria	United Kingdom	The ship was driven ashore at Limerick.
New York	Bremen	The barque was driven into a Swedish brig at Odesa and was severely damaged. She was consequently condemned.
Oscar	Russia	The ship was driven ashore at Sulina, Ottoman Empire. She was on a voyage from Odesa to Marseille, Bouches-du-Rhône, France.
Unity	(United Kingdom of Great Britain and Ireland) Guernsey	The ship was driven ashore and sank near Aalborg, Denmark. Her crew were rescued. She was on a voyage from Svendborg, Denmark to South Shields, County Durham and/or Guernsey.
West Indian	United Kingdom	The ship was wrecked near "Puerte del Padre", Bahamas. Her crew were rescued.

== 22 December ==
List of shipwrecks: 22 December 1846
Ship	State	Description
Amalia and Laura	Danzig	The ship ran aground in the Swinebottoms, off the coast of Denmark. She was on a voyage from London, United Kingdom to Danzig. She was refloated and resumed her voyage.
Ann	United Kingdom	The schooner was driven ashore at Gibraltar. Her crew were rescued. She was on a voyage from Smyrna, Ottoman Empire to London. She was refloated on 9 January 1847 and taken in to Gibraltar.
Ann	Hamburg	The ship was wrecked. She was on a voyage from Hamburg to Saint Thomas, Virgin Islands.
Apollo	Unknown flag	The ship departed from New York, United States for Antwerp, Belgium. Presumed foundered with the loss of all hands. The wreck of the full-rigged ship Apollo (United Kingdom) was sighted in the Atlantic Ocean on 31 January 1847.
Caraquena	France	The ship was driven ashore at Saint-Martin-de-Ré, Charente-Maritime. She was on a voyage from Bordeaux, Gironde to La Guaira, Venezuela.
Cynthia	United Kingdom	The sloop was driven ashore at the mouth of the River Tees. Her crew were rescued.
Fiducia	Kingdom of Hanover	The ship sprang a leak in the Jahde and was abandoned. She was on a voyage from Hooksiel to the Clyde.
Findhorn	United Kingdom	The brig was in collision with the barque Viscount Hardinge (United Kingdom) and sank in the North Sea off the coast of County Durham. Her crew were rescued by Viscount Hardinge and Mentor (United Kingdom).
Hengist	United Kingdom	The steamship was driven ashore at Wremen. She was on a voyage from Hull, Yorkshire to Hamburg. She was refloated on 24 December and towed in to Bremerhaven.
Jane	France	The brig was wrecked in the Caicos Islands. She was on a voyage from Arichat, Nova Scotia, British North America to Havana, Cuba.
Ocean Queen	(United Kingdom of Great Britain and Ireland) Jersey	The brigantine was driven ashore at Gibraltar. She was on a voyage from Ancona, Papal States to Liverpool, Lancashire. She was refloated the next day.

== 23 December ==
List of shipwrecks: 23 December 1846
Ship	State	Description
Châteaubriant	France	The ship was driven ashore near Bordeaux, Gironde.
Gironde	France	The ship was driven ashore at L'Aiguillon-sur-Mer, Vendée. Her crew were rescued. She was on a voyage from Bordeaux to Dublin, United Kingdom.
La Dorade	France	The ship was lost on this date. Her crew were rescued by Laurel (United Kingdom).
Triumph	United Kingdom	The ship was driven ashore at Hartlepool, County Durham with the loss of a crew member.

== 24 December ==
List of shipwrecks: 24 December 1846
Ship	State	Description
Amalia''	United Kingdom	The brig was destroyed by fire off Charlottetown, Prince Edward Island British North America. She was on a voyage from Prince Edward Island to Liverpool, Lancashire.
Anna	Hamburg	The ship was driven ashore and wrecked at the mouth of the Douro. Her crew were rescued. She was on a voyage from Hamburg to Saint Domingo.
Benjamin	United Kingdom	The ship was driven ashore and wrecked north of Flamborough Head, Yorkshire. Her crew were rescued.
Dunvagan	United Kingdom	The sloop was driven ashore and wrecked at North Blyth, Northumberland with the loss of all hands. She was on a voyage from Sunderland, County Durham, to King's Lynn, Norfolk.
Joseph	France	The schooner was wrecked at Quiberon, Morbihan with the loss of all hands.
Margarets	United Kingdom	The ship was driven ashore at Flamborough Head, Yorkshire. Her crew were rescued by Livingston (United Kingdom).
Reliance	United Kingdom	The brig was driven ashore at New York, United States. She was on a voyage from the Turks Islands to New York.
Theron	United Kingdom	The brig was wrecked on the Dunnet Sands, in the North Sea off the coast of Caithness. Also reported as 27 December.
Yorkshire	United Kingdom	The barque ran aground on the East Gar Sand, in the North Sea off the coast of Yorkshire and was damaged. She was refloated.

== 25 December ==
List of shipwrecks: 25 December 1846
Ship	State	Description
Bell Rock	United Kingdom	The ship was abandoned off Budehaven, Cornwall. Her crew were rescued by Stuckley (United Kingdom.
Enterprise	United Kingdom	The brig ran aground on the Herd Sand, in the North Sea off the coast of County Durham. Her crew were rescued. She was on a voyage from Liverpool, Lancashire to Newcastle upon Tyne, Northumberland. She capsized the next day and was wrecked. Enterprise was refloated on 19 January 1847 and taken in to South Shields, County Durham.
Experiment	Duchy of Lucca	The ship was wrecked off Bayliss's Bay, Jamaica. Her crew were rescued. She was on a voyage from Lucca to Grand Cayman, Cayman Islands.
Idea	United Kingdom	The ship was abandoned in the Atlantic Ocean. Her crew were rescued by Regent (United Kingdom).
Inverness	United Kingdom	The schooner was wrecked at "Campo Bello". She was on a voyage from "Papeti", Nova Scotia, British North America to Portland, Dorset.
Somerville	United Kingdom	The ship was driven ashore at Adra, Spain. She was on a voyage from Newcastle upon Tyne to Aden and Odesa.

== 26 December ==
List of shipwrecks: 26 December 1846
Ship	State	Description
Ann	United Kingdom	The ship was driven ashore at Gibraltar. She was on a voyage from Smyrna, Ottoman Empire to London. She was refloated on 9 January 1847 and taken in to Gibraltar.
Bowyer Smith	United Kingdom	The ship was wrecked on Grand Manan. Her crew were rescued. She was on a voyage from Liverpool, Lancashire to Saint John, New Brunswick, British North America.
James	United Kingdom	The ship was wrecked on rocks off Canisbay, Caithness. Her crew were rescued. She was on a voyage from Aberdeen to Thurso, Caithness.
Laura	Bremen	The ship was driven ashore by ice in the Weser. She was on a voyage from Cette, Hérault, France to Bremen. She was refloated on 30 December and taken in to Bremerhaven.
Minerva	United Kingdom	The ship was lost with all hands on this date.
Resource	United Kingdom	The barque was abandoned in the Atlantic Ocean. Her crew were rescued by Georgiana (United Kingdom). Resource was on a voyage from Quebec City, Province of Canada, British North America to London.
Richmond Lass	United Kingdom	The ship was abandoned in the Atlantic Ocean. Her crew were rescued by Highland Chief (United Kingdom).
Robert	United Kingdom	The sloop was wrecked near "Ballystown", County Dublin.
Zebra	Sweden	The ship was abandoned at sea. Her crew were rescued by a British schooner.

== 27 December ==
List of shipwrecks: 27 December 1846
Ship	State	Description
Daisy	United Kingdom	The ship was driven ashore east of Ostend, West Flanders, Belgium. She was on a voyage from Odesa to Antwerp, Belgium.
Emilie	France	The ship foundered in the Mediterranean Sea off Mahón, Spain with the loss of all hands.
Emma	France	The ship ran aground off Fort Santa Barbara, Spain. She was on a voyage from Marseille, Bouches-du-Rhône to "Santa Martha". She was refloated.
HMRC Petrel	Board of Customs	The cutter was driven ashore in Swanage Bay. She was refloated and towed in to Weymouth, Dorset in a leaky condition.

== 28 December ==
List of shipwrecks: 28 December 1846
Ship	State	Description
Andromeda	United Kingdom	The ship was abandoned in the Atlantic Ocean. Her crew were rescued. She was on a voyage from Patagonia, Argentina to Falmouth, Cornwall.
Apollo	United Kingdom	The ship ran aground on the Whitby Rock. She was refloated.
Caennaise	France	The ship ran aground on the Whitby Rock. She was on a voyage from Sunderland, County Durham, United Kingdom to Caen, Calvados. She was refloated and taken in to Whitby, Yorkshire in a very leaky condition.
George and Mary, or Thomas and Mary	United Kingdom	The ship was driven ashore at Flamborough Head, Yorkshire. She was refloated the next day and taken in to Bridlington for repairs.
Henrietta	(United Kingdom of Great Britain and Ireland) British North America	The ship departed from New York for Saint John, New Brunswick. No further trace, presumed foundered with the loss of all hands.
Marion	United States	The ship was wrecked on the Loo Key Shoals. She was on a voyage from Batavia, Netherlands East Indies to New Orleans, Louisiana.
Sleepless	United Kingdom	The ship was driven ashore at Flamborough Head. She was refloated the next day and resumed her voyage.
William Clark	United Kingdom	The ship ran aground on the Whitby Rock. She was refloated and resumed her voyage.

== 29 December ==
List of shipwrecks: 29 December 1847
Ship	State	Description
Alexander Harvey	United Kingdom	The ship was severely damaged by fire at Valparaíso, Chile.
Apollo	United Kingdom	The schooner ran aground off the coast of County Durham. She was on a voyage from Sunderland, County Durham to Portsmouth, Hampshire. She was refloated and put back to Sunderland.
Daguerre	France	The ship was driven ashore near La Rochelle, Charente-Maritime.
Leander	Prussia	The ship was driven ashore near the "Marabout Castle". She was refloated on 5 January 1847 and towed in to Alexandria, Egypt.
Maria Louisa	Chile	The ship caught fire and sank at Valparaíso.
Mary	United Kingdom	The ship was wrecked on the Haisborough Sands, in the North Sea off the coast of Norfolk. Her crew were rescued. She was on a voyage from Hartlepool, County Durham to London.
Unnamed	Chile	The hulk caught fire and sank at Valparaíso.

== 30 December ==
List of shipwrecks: 30 December 1846
Ship	State	Description
Ætna	United Kingdom	The ship was driven ashore at Flamborough Head, Yorkshire. She was on a voyage from Calcutta, India to Newcastle upon Tyne, Northumberland. She was refloated and completed her voyage.
Amandus	Bremen	The ship was driven ashore near the mouth of the Weser. She was on a voyage from Hull, Yorkshire, United Kingdom to Bremen. She was refloated on 9 January 1847.
Amor	Bremen	The ship ran aground on the Langluitjensand. She was on a voyage from Hull to Bremen.
Dart	United Kingdom	The ship ran aground on the Barber Sand, in the North Sea off the coast of Norfolk. She was on a voyage from Sunderland, County Durham, to Portsmouth, Hampshire. She was refloated and resumed her voyage.
Gerhard Hermann	Bremen	The ship was driven ashore and wrecked on Galveston Island, Texas, United States with the loss of eight or nine lives.
Gironde	France	The ship was destroyed by fire at Saint-Martin-de-Ré, Charente-Maritime. She was on a voyage from Bordeaux, Gironde to Dublin, United Kingdom.
Hand of Providence	United Kingdom	The ship was driven ashore at Flamborough Head. She was refloated and resumed her voyage.
Hendrick Hudson	United Kingdom	The ship was wrecked off Kerlouan, Finistère, France. She was on a voyage from the Isles of Scilly to London
Hendrika Arentina, or Hendrika Jacoba	Netherlands	The ship ran aground on the Schielhoek, in the North Sea off the coast of Zeeland. Her crew were rescued. She was on a voyage from Cephalonia, United States of the Ionian Islands to Hellevoetsluis, Zeeland. She was refloated on 5 January 1847 and taken in to Hellevoetsluis.
Ida	United Kingdom	The ship was abandoned in the Atlantic Ocean with the loss of three of her crew. Survivors were rescued by Champion (United Kingdom). Ida was on a voyage from Quebec City, Province of Canada, British North America to Liverpool, Lancashire.
Liberty	United Kingdom	The ship was driven ashore at Dimlington, Yorkshire. She was on a voyage from Middlesbrough, Yorkshire to London. She was refloated and put in to Scarborough, Yorkshire in a leaky condition.
Pomona	Prussia	The ship ran aground at North Shields, County Durham. She was on a voyage from Memel to North Shields. She was refloated with the assistance of four steamships.
Margaretha Ida	Netherlands	The ship ran aground on the Hinder Sand, in the North Sea off the coast of Zeeland. She was on a voyage from Hellevoetsluis to Batavia, Netherlands East Indies. She was refloated and taken in to Brouwershaven, Zeeland.
Sabrina	United Kingdom	The steamship was driven ashore in the River Lee. She was on a voyage from Cork to Bristol, Gloucestershire.
Valiant	France	The French whaler Valiant, Captain Vanier, was wrecked near Margarita Bay, Lower California.

== 31 December ==
List of shipwrecks: 31 December 1846
Ship	State	Description
Caroline	United Kingdom	The ship was holed by her anchor and sank off Woodside, Aberdeenshire. She was on a voyage from Inverness to Leith, Lothian.
Dante	(Ottoman Empire) Beylik of Tunis	The Bey of Tunis's steamship was wrecked at Tunis.
Herbert	United Kingdom	The schooner was wrecked at São Miguel Island, Azores. Her crew were rescued.
John Rundle	United Kingdom	The ship was driven ashore at Margate, Kent. She was on a voyage from Antwerp, Belgium to Belfast, County Antrim. She was refloated.
Johns	United Kingdom	The ship struck a rock and sank off Point Romania. She was on a voyage from Singapore to Whampoa, China.
Resource	United Kingdom	The ship was severely damaged by fire off King's Lynn, Norfolk.
Tynwald; HMS Urgent	(United Kingdom of Great Britain and Ireland) Isle of Man; Royal Navy	The paddle steamers were in collision in Liverpool Bay off the Formby Lightship ( Trinity House). Both vessels were severely damaged, with a crew member of Tynwald killed. Tynwald was on a voyage from Douglas, Isle of Man to Liverpool, Lancashire. HMS Urgent was on a voyage from Liverpool to Dublin.

== Unknown date ==
List of shipwrecks: Unknown date in December 1846
Ship	State	Description
Amelia	United Kingdom	The ship was abandoned in the Atlantic Ocean after 6 December. Her crew were rescued by Sea Bird (United Kingdom).
Aristides	United Kingdom	The ship was abandoned south of Madagascar before 30 December. She was on a voyage from Calcutta, India to the Cape of Good Hope.
Astrea	United Kingdom	The ship was driven ashore in the Dardanelles before 1 January 1847. She had been refloated by 5 January.
Aurelian	United Kingdom	The ship was wrecked before 10 December. She was on a voyage from Quebec City, Province of Canada, British North America to Portsmouth, Hampshire.
Bella Antonia	Spain	The ship was lost between 17 and 28 December with the loss of five of her crew. She was on a voyage from Cádiz to Matanzas, Cuba.
Canton	Haiti	The barque was wrecked on the Muscle Ridges, off the coast on New York, United States.
Courrier de Bruik	France	The ship was driven ashore near Santoña, Spain. She was on a voyage from Bordeaux, Gironde to Martinique.
Dorothy	Spain	The ship foundered in the Atlantic Ocean. Her crew were rescued by Spartan (United Kingdom).
Eagle	United Kingdom	The ship was driven ashore near Gallipoli, Ottoman Empire.
Eliza	United Kingdom	The ship ran aground off Thornham, Norfolk before 16 December. She was on a voyage from Thornham to Liverpool, Lancashire.
Emanuel	Stettin	The ship was lost off Skagen, Denmark before 2 December.
Flirt	United Kingdom	The ship was wrecked on the Black Rock Ledge, off Port Ebert Point, British North America. Her crew were rescued. She was on a voyage from Saint Thomas, Virgin Islands to Halifax, Nova Scotia.
Friendship	United Kingdom	The ship was abandoned in the Atlantic Ocean before 29 December. Her crew were rescued by Curteis (United States). Friendship was on a voyage from Dublin to Halifax.
Gerhardus Hendrikus	Netherlands	The ship sank in Tor Bay before 13 December. She was on a voyage from Bordeaux, Gironde, France to Amsterdam, North Holland.
Heureuse Pauline	France	The brig was wrecked near Le Palais, Morbihan.
Jane	(United Kingdom of Great Britain and Ireland) British North America	The ship was lost off Cape Tormentine, New Brunswick with the loss of all hands.
Jane	United Kingdom	The schooner was abandoned in the Atlantic Ocean by her seven surviving crew, four having been washed overboard and drowned on 22 December. Six people survived to be rescued by the schooner Adelaide (United Kingdom) on 27 December. Jane was on a voyage from St. Ubes, Portugal to Falmouth, Cornwall.
Jane Sprott	United Kingdom	The ship was in collision with a sloop and was beached on Goat Island, Maine, United States. She was on a voyage from Halifax, Nova Scotia, British North America to New York, United States. She was refloated and put in to Newport, Rhode Island, United States, where she arrived on 22 December.
John and Thomas	United Kingdom	The ship capsized off the coast of Norway. She was towed in to Hammerfest.
Jules de Blosseville	United Kingdom	The ship was wrecked near Padstow, Cornwall, United Kingdom before 4 December. She was on a voyage from Saint Domingo to Le Havre, Seine-Inférieure.
Kingston	United Kingdom	The ship was driven ashore in the Saint Lawrence River downstream of Saint-Anne-de-Beaupré, Province of Canada.
Leavitt	United Kingdom	The ship was driven ashore at Sandy Hook, New Jersey, United States. She was on a voyage from Saint John, New Brunswick to New York City. She was later refloated and towed in to New York in a severely damaged condition.
Llewellin	United Kingdom	The ship was driven ashore in the Saint Lawrence River downstream of Saint-Anne-de-Beaupré.
Lloyd's	United Kingdom	The ship was driven ashore in the Saint Lawrence River downstream of Saint-Anne-de-Beaupré.
Lord Goderich	United Kingdom	The ship was abandoned in the Warangerfiord. Her crew survived, eight of them being rescued by the brig William (United Kingdom).
Margaret	United Kingdom	The brig was driven ashore at Grimsby, Lincolnshire before 14 December.
Maria	(United Kingdom of Great Britain and Ireland) British North America	The ship was run ashore near Shediac, Nova Scotia.
Mary Ann	United Kingdom	The ship was driven ashore at Bermeo, Spain before 23 December. She was on a voyage from Ardrossan, Ayrshire to Bilbao, Spain. She was refloated and taken in to Bilbao.
Mary Sheill	United Kingdom	The ship was abandoned in the Atlantic Ocean before 27 December. Her crew were rescued by Richard Anderson (United States). Mary Sheill was on a voyage from Liverpool to Halifax, Nova Scotia, British North America.
Mersey	United Kingdom	The ship was driven ashore and wrecked at Matane, Province of Canada before 7 December. She was on a voyage from Quebec City, Province of Canada to Liverpool.
Monte Christo	France	The ship was wrecked at Quiberon, Morbihan before 25 December with the loss of eight of her crew. She was on a voyage from Batavia, Netherlands East Indies to Nantes, Loire-Inférieure.
New Carlisle	United Kingdom	The ship was wrecked in the Saint Lawrence River downstream of Sainte-Anne-des-Monts, Province of Canada. She was on a voyage from Quebec City to Gaspé.
Northampton	United Kingdom	The ship was abandoned in the Atlantic Ocean before 15 December.
Pavilion	(United Kingdom of Great Britain and Ireland) Jersey	The ship was abandoned in the Atlantic Ocean. Her crew were rescued by Ianthe (United Kingdom). She was on a voyage from Paspébian, Province of Canada to Jersey.
Pons Ælii	United Kingdom	The ship ran aground on the Horseshoe Reef, off the coast of British North America.
Prima Donna	United Kingdom	The ship was deliberately sunk by her crew in the Java Sea after her officers had been murdered. She was on a voyage from Hobart, Van Diemen's Land to an English port. Fourteen crew reached Bali in the ship's longboat. They were taken into custody after discrepancies in the various accounts given of the ship's sinking.
Reliance	United Kingdom	The ship was driven ashore and wrecked at Matane before 7 December. She was on a voyage from Quebec City to Liverpool.
Resource	United Kingdom	The ship was abandoned in the Atlantic Ocean off the coast of Brazil. Her crew were rescued by a Brazilian or Portuguese schooner. She was on a voyage from Montevideo, Uruguay to Liverpool.
Ringdove	(United Kingdom of Great Britain and Ireland) British North America	The ship was wrecked on Cape Tormentine. Her crew were rescued. She was on a voyage from Pictou, Nova Scotia to Miramichi, New Brunswick.
Royalist	United Kingdom	The ship was abandoned in the Atlantic Ocean (47°10′N 8°20′W). Her crew were rescued by Comet (Spain).
Ruby	United Kingdom	The ship was wrecked at "Cook Cove", British North America before 10 December. She was on a voyage from Saguenay, Province of Canada to London.
Search	United Kingdom	The ship was damaged at Larache, Morocco before 16 December. She was subsequently taken in to Larache for repairs.
Siren	United Kingdom	The brig was abandoned in the Atlantic Ocean before 21 December. She was on a voyage from Kertch, Russia to Falmouth.
Sirocco	France	The steamship sank in the Rhône.
Stanton	United Kingdom	The barque was driven ashore and wrecked at McNair's Cove, in the Gut of Canso. She was on a voyage from Hull, Yorkshire to Miramichi.
Temperance	(United Kingdom of Great Britain and Ireland) British North America	The ship was wrecked near Pugwash, Nova Scotia before 8 December. She was on a voyage from Halifax to Prince Edward Island.
Thames	United Kingdom	The ship was driven ashore in the Saint Lawrence River downstream of Saint-Anne-de-Beaupré.
Thomas	United Kingdom	The brig was driven ashore in the Saint Lawrence River downstream of Saint-Anne-de-Beaupré before 10 December. Her crew survived.
Washington	United States	The ship was abandoned in the Atlantic Ocean. Her crew were rescued by the brig R. F. Toper (United States). Washington was on a voyage from Baltimore, Maryland to Belfast, County Antrim, United Kingdom.
Zelica	United States	The ship was driven ashore at Machias, Maine before 2 December, Her crew were rescued. She was on a voyage from Wilmington, Delaware to Eastport, Maine.
23 Mai	France	The brig was wrecked at the "Harbour of Mercy", Chile.
574	United Kingdom	The brig was wrecked on Anticosti Island, Nova Scotia. Her crew were rescued. She was on a voyage from Quebec City, Province of Canada to Swansea, Glamorgan.
