= George Nicholas Hardinge =

Captain George Nicholas Hardinge
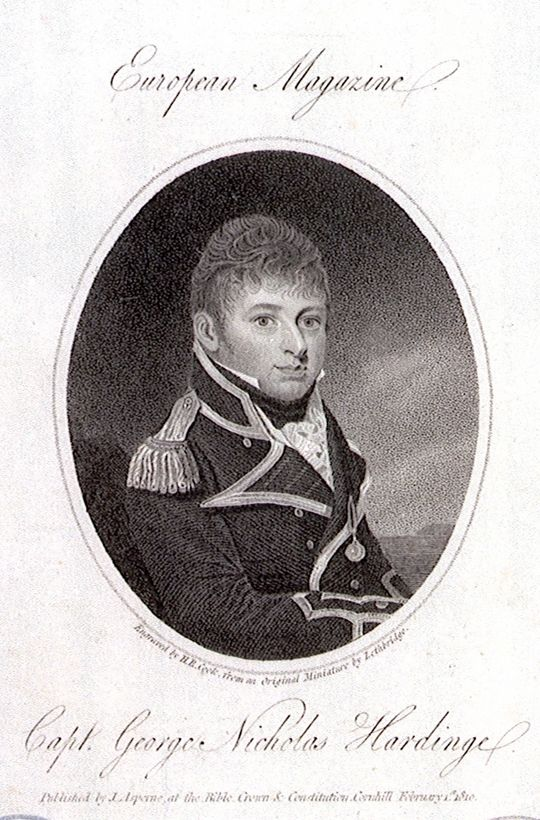
- Born: 11 April 1781; Kingston upon Thames, Surrey
- Died: 8 March 1808 (aged 26); Aboard HMS St Fiorenzo, off Ceylon
- Military career
- Allegiance: Great Britain; United Kingdom
- Branch: Royal Navy
- Service years: 1793–1808
- Rank: Captain
- Commands: HMS Terror; HMS Scorpion; HMS St Fiorenzo
- Conflicts: French Revolutionary Wars; Siege of Toulon; Naval Battle of Hyères Islands; Capture of the Guillaume Tell; Egyptian Campaign; Napoleonic Wars; Capture of the Cape; Capture of the Piémontaise

Captain George Nicholas Hardinge (11 April 1781 – 8 March 1808) was a Royal Navy officer who served in the French Revolutionary and Napoleonic Wars. Possessing an ability to endear himself to senior officers through his intellect and good manners, he served under several important naval commanders, whose patronage allowed him to rise through the ranks. In 1804 when he led a cutting-out operation against two Batavian Navy corvettes. Promotion to post captain left him temporarily without a command, and he was to be disappointed in a number of the ships he was offered when they turned out to be either unfit for service, or still under construction.

Having ended up in the East Indies he was forced to make do with an elderly frigate he had first served on as a midshipman much earlier in his career. While commanding this ship he fought an action with a superior French opponent, and after a gruelling three-day battle the British were victorious and the French captain surrendered. Hardinge did not live to see the moment, having been killed by grapeshot shortly before. He was buried with full military honours and monuments to his memory were erected in St. Thomas Cathedral, Bombay and St Paul's Cathedral, London.

== Family and early life ==
George Hardinge was born in Kingston upon Thames, Surrey on 11 April 1781, the second son of Reverend Henry Hardinge, and his wife Frances. His education was taken in hand by his uncle, George Hardinge, a judge, who sent him to Eton to study law. George Nicholas did not do well at school, and instead asked to go to sea, perhaps influenced by his uncle, Sir Richard Hardinge, who was a captain of an East Indiaman. He consequently joined the Royal Navy in 1793 as a midshipman aboard the 32-gun frigate HMS Meleager under Captain Charles Tyler, and saw action at the Siege of Toulon and the reduction of Corsica. When Tyler moved to take command of the captured French frigate Minerve, which had been taken into Royal Navy service as HMS St Fiorenzo, he took Midshipman Hardinge with him. This was the ship that Hardinge would die in command of 15 years later.

Hardinge continued to move ships to remain in Tyler's service, and both were present aboard HMS Diadem at the Naval Battle of Hyères Islands on 13 July 1794. The pair saw continued service off the Italian coast during the following months, and it was during this time that Hardinge came to the attention of Sir William Hamilton, the British envoy to the Kingdom of Naples. Hamilton introduced Hardinge to the study of history and the arts. Hardinge returned to England for a brief period in 1798, but returned to sea aboard Tyler's new command, the 38-gun HMS Aigle. The Aigle was wrecked off the African coast on 18 July, but Hardinge survived to be rescued, and duly came to the attention of Earl St Vincent. Hardinge's talent for impressing senior officials with his intellect led to St Vincent appointing him to the 74-gun HMS Theseus, under the command of Captain Ralph Willett Miller. He was still aboard the Theseus when Miller was killed in an accidental explosion in May 1799, that left the ship severely damaged. Hardinge returned to Britain where he was transferred to the 80-gun HMS Foudroyant as a supernumerary lieutenant under Captain Edward Berry, and on returning to the Mediterranean he was involved in the battle which led to the capture of the 80-gun French ship Guillaume Tell on 30 March 1800. Hardinge remained in the Mediterranean after this, serving under Captain Sir Sidney Smith aboard the 80-gun HMS Tigre. He was involved in the operations of the Egyptian Campaign, and was promoted to lieutenant on 15 October 1800, subsequently receiving the Turkish Gold Medal.

== Command ==
Hardinge's earlier patron, Earl St Vincent, had by now risen to the post of First Lord of the Admiralty, and he promoted Hardinge to the rank of commander on 29 April 1802. He had to wait nearly a year though before he obtained his first ship, the bomb vessel HMS Terror in March 1803. Serving in the English Channel, initially under Captain Edward Owen, and later Admiral James Saumarez, he took part in the attack on Granville. The Terror was heavily damaged in this operation, and Hardinge's next command was the 18-gun HMS Scorpion, which he commanded in the North Sea. On 28 March 1804 he was sailing off the Vlie when he discovered two Batavian Navy corvettes at anchor in the roads. Since Scorpion was too large to risk navigating the passage, Hardinge decided to make an attack with his boats.

While waiting for conditions that would allow an attack, he was joined by the 14-gun HMS Beaver, and at 9.30 in the evening of 31 March two boats from Beaver and three from Scorpion altogether carrying 60 men, set off to attack the corvettes. They approached Atalante, the nearest one, and boarded her, with Hardinge being the first to leap aboard. After some fierce fighting they subdued the ship's crew, with Hardinge at one point fighting hand to hand with Atalante's captain, who was able to disarm him before other members of the crew came to Hardinge's aid. Seeing that his opponent was outnumbered, Hardinge called upon the Batavian captain to surrender, but he refused and the British were forced to kill him. "He fell covered with honourable wounds", as Hardinge later recounted. The British secured Atalante and attempted to attack the second Batavian corvette but found that she had moved out of range. Hardinge instead laboured to take Atalante out to sea and though hampered by a gale succeeded after three days.

Although he had been rewarded for his bravery with a promotion to post captain on 10 April 1804, and a sword worth £100 from the Lloyd's Patriotic Fund, Hardinge found it difficult to return to active service. He was at first assigned to command the 24-gun HMS Proselyte and to escort a convoy to the West Indies, but was instead transferred to HMS Valorous. The Valorous was found to be unfit for sea, but he was given the command of HMS Salsette, a frigate then supposed to be fitting out at Bombay. He made his way to the East Indies, taking part in the Capture of the Cape en route, but on his arrival at Bombay he found that the Salsette had only just been laid down. He was promised her command when she was completed, but in the meantime had to make do with the old fifth rate HMS St Fiorenzo, a ship he had served as a midshipman on 15 years earlier.

== Death ==
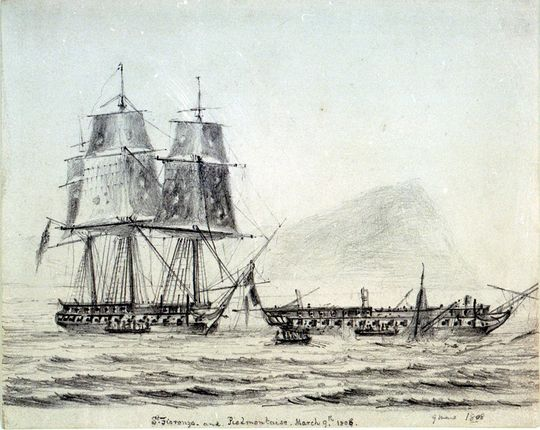
HMS St Fiorenzo and Piémontaise

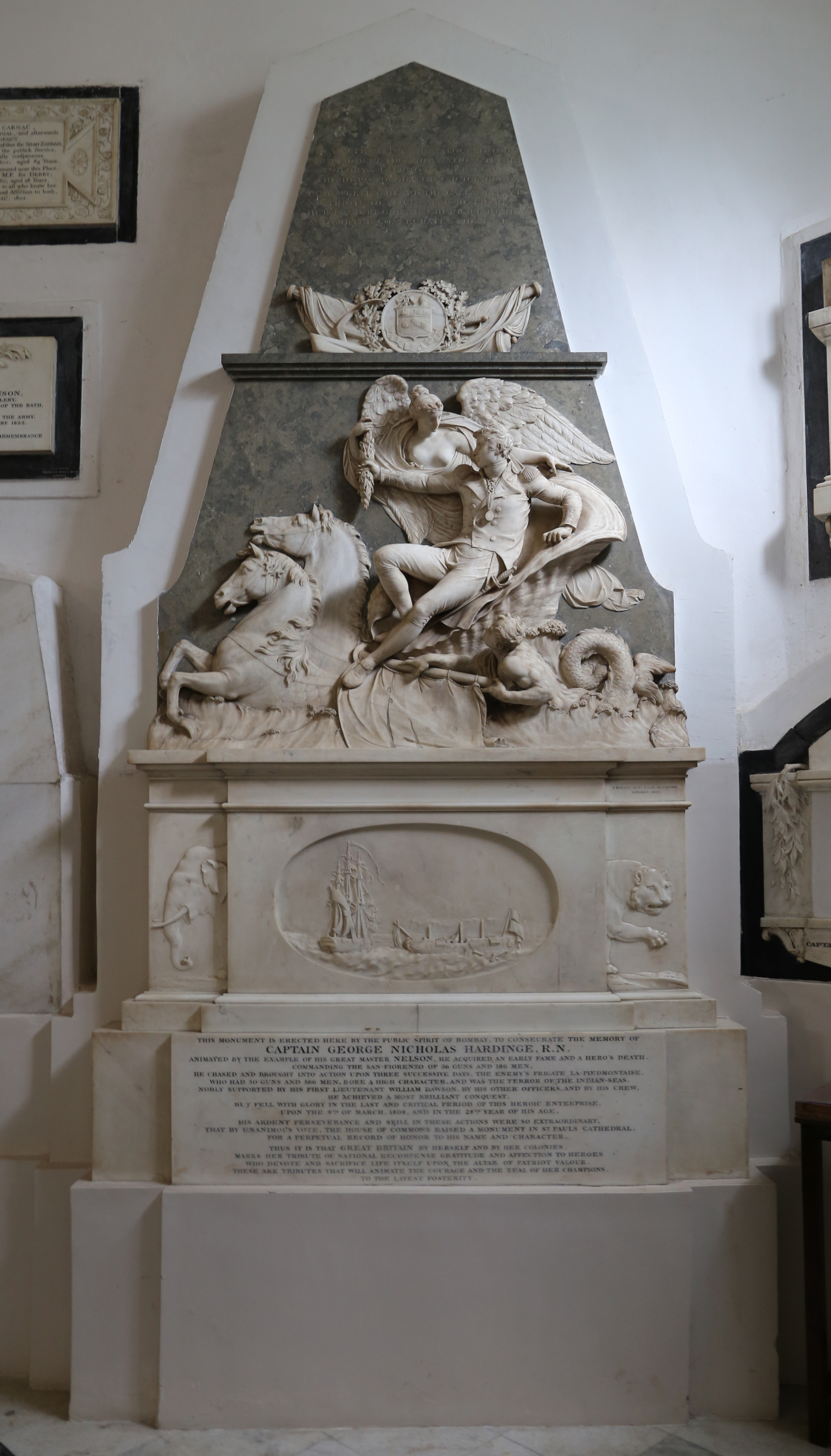
Funerary monument is St. Thomas Cathedral, Mumbai, by John Bacon Jr.

Hardinge made a number of uneventful patrols in the Indian Ocean, but on 6 March 1808 he came across three East Indiamen being followed by the 40-gun French frigate Piémontaise. He turned to confront the Frenchman, who attempted to escape. St Fiorenzo chased the Piémontaise for the next several days, with intermittent fighting as the French turned to engage their pursuer, before sailing away again. They were finally brought to a decisive battle on 8 March, where after an hour and twenty minutes of fierce fighting, they surrendered. French losses amounted to 48 dead and 112 wounded, while the British lost 13 dead and 25 wounded. Captain Hardinge was among the dead, killed by grapeshot shortly before the Piémontaise surrendered. He was buried at Colombo with full military honours, and monuments to his memory were erected in Bombay and in St Paul's Cathedral.

Following this action he was awarded a £300 Lloyd's Patriotic Fund Silver Vase, the inscription upon which reads: 'IN MEMORY OF GEORGE NICHOLAS HARDINGE ESQ'R CAPTAIN OF HMS ST. FIORENZO, OF 36 GUNS Who NOBLY FELL in the Moment of Victory, while COMMANDING THAT SHIP in ACTION with LA PIEDMONTESE, FRENCH SHIP, of 50 GUNS, OFF CEYLON on the 8 of March 1808 after a continued ACTION of the Three successive Days as recorded in the LONDON Gazette of the 20 of December 1808 THIS VASE IS PRESENTED TO HIS UNCLE GEORGE HARDINGE ESQR KINGS COUNCIL ATTORNEY GENERAL TO THE QUEEN, and his MAJESTY'S JUSTICE for the Counties of Glamorgan, Brecon and Radnor FROM THE PATRIOTIC FUND AT LLOYDS'.

On 29 November 1809, His Majesty George III granted to the Hardinge family an augmentation to their coat of arms commemorating both the victory over Piemontaise and Hardinge's earlier victory over Atalanta.
