= Hired armed tender United Brothers =

HM hired armed tender United Brothers was under contract to the Royal Navy from 5 June 1803 to 6 January 1807, though a French privateer captured her on 9 December 1806 off the Lizard. United Brothers had a burthen of 143 1/94 tons (bm). She was lightly armed, carrying four 3-pounder guns and six ½-pounder swivel guns.

In May 1805 she was on the Bristol station under the command of Lieutenant John Forbes. At some point Lieutenant William McKenzie replaced Forbes.

On 9 December 1806, the French privateer Glâneur captured United Brothers. United Brothers was carrying new recruits to Plymouth when at first light McKenzie sighted a ketch. He lost her in the haze, but suddenly she appeared off the weather quarter. McKenzie cleared for action and returned fire when the ketch attacked. He was killed after about 40 minutes and the master, Francis Hernaman, took command. After another 40 minutes the British saw an approaching sail, which they believed to be a second privateer. United Brothers had had most of her rigging shot away and Hernaman decided to strike. In the fight, United Brothers lost two men killed, one being McKenzie, and one man wounded. Glâneur is variously described as having 10 to 16 guns. Glâneur took her prize into Perros, Brittany.

Almost a year later, on 3 December 1807, HMS Scorpion captured Glâneur, putting an end to her career. Glâneur had been preying on shipping for two years and had been the most successful privateer out of Saint-Malo. British vessels had repeatedly chased her but she had repeatedly escaped by "superiority of sailing".
