= Fame (1801 ship) =

History

United Kingdom
- Name: Fame
- Owner: Voyages 1-2: William Holden; Voyage 3:John Wedderburn
- Builder: James M. Hillhouse, Bristol,
- Launched: 1801
- Captured: June and September 1806
- Fate: Last listed in 1811

General characteristics
- Tons burthen: 492, or 49257/94, 520 or 527 (bm)
- Length: 118 ft 3 in (36.0 m) (overall); keel 94 ft 4 in (28.8 m) (keel)
- Beam: 31 ft 4 in (9.6 m)
- Depth of hold: 13 ft 0 in (4.0 m)
- Propulsion: Sail
- Complement: 1804:50; 1806:60
- Armament: 1804:19 × 12&6&4-pounder guns; 1806:16 × 12-pounder guns
- Notes: Three decks

Fame was launched at Bristol in 1801 and repaired and measured in 1802 by Perry, on the Thames. She made two voyages for the British East India Company (EIC). On her third voyage a French frigate captured her. She apparently returned to British hands and was last listed in 1811.

== Career ==
EIC voyage #1 (1802-1803): Captain John Valentine Baker Captain Baker sailed from Portsmouth on 12 May 1802, bound for Bengal and Bencoolen. Fame arrived at Calcutta on 28 September. She was next at Kedgeree on 5 January 1803, Penang on 29 January, and Bencoolen on 26 February. Homeward bound, she reached St Helena on 4 June, and arrived at Long Reach on 26 August.

EIC voyage #2 (1804-1805): Captain Baker acquired a letter of marque on 23 January 1804. (Note: This letter is erroneously listed under the name James.) Baker sailed from Plymouth on 26 February 1804, bound for Madras and Bengal. Fame was at Madeira on 29 March, reached Madras on 27 July and Masuliptam on 21 August, and arrived at Calcutta on 4 September. Homeward bound, she was at Kedgeree on 12 December and Madras again on 12 February 1805. She reached St Helena on 20 June, before arriving at Blackwall on 18 September.

== Capture ==
Captain James Jameson acquired a letter of marque on 12 February 1806. On 30 March he sailed from Portsmouth for Bombay and Bengal.

On 24 September 1806 the French frigate Piémontaise captured Fame at 9°10′N 76°00′E as Fame was sailing from Bombay to Bengal. There was a short action, in which Piémontaise suffered 17 casualties and Fame seven. One British death was Midshipman Peter Paton.

The French sent Fame into Mauritius, where she was offered for sale on 26 December. The EIC reported that it had had no cargo aboard her.

== British vessel again ==
In a process that is unclear, Fame returned to her owners. Lloyd's Register and the Register of Shipping continue to carry her to 1811 with Jameson, master, Wedderburn, owner, and trade London—Bengal. Both also show her as having undergone a survey in 1807 that rated her "A1".
