= HMS Scorpion (1803) =

Brig-sloop of the Royal Navy

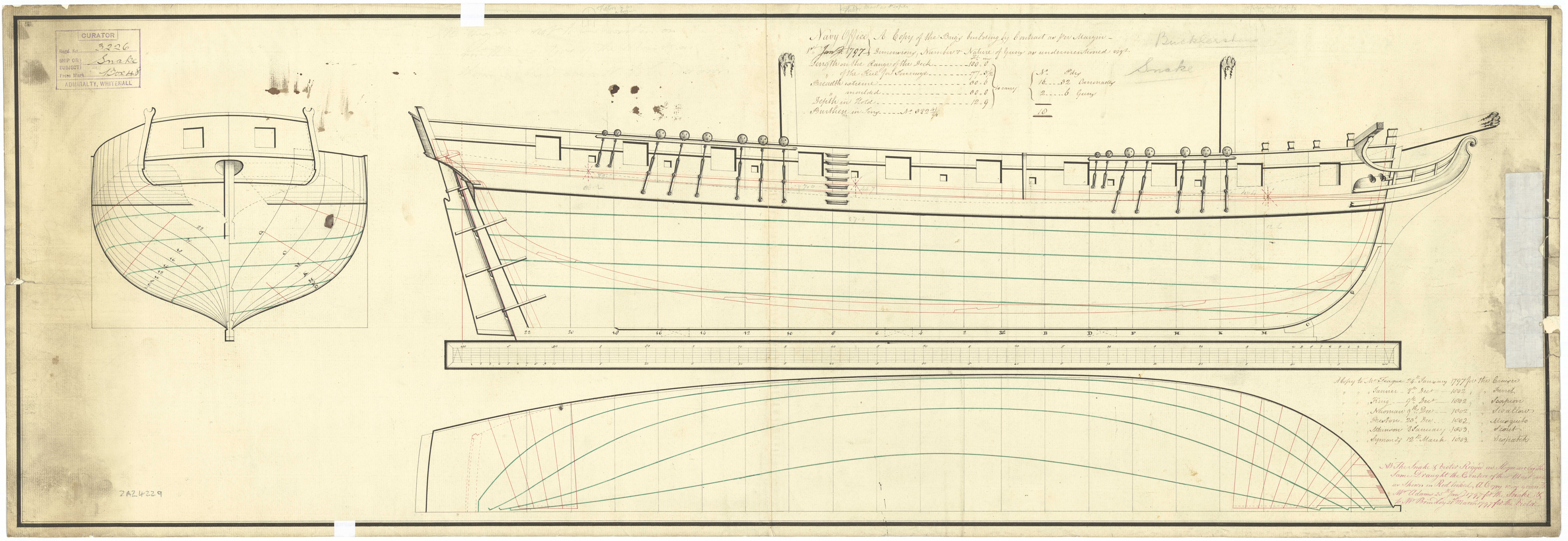
- Scorpion

History

United Kingdom
- Name: HMS Scorpion
- Ordered: 27 November 1802
- Builder: John King, Dover
- Laid down: January 1803
- Launched: 17 October 1803
- Honours and awards: Naval General Service Medal clasps; "Scorpion 31 March 1804"; "Scorpion 12 Jany. 1810"; "Guadaloupe"
- Fate: Sold 3 February 1819

General characteristics
- Type: Cruizer-class brig-sloop
- Tons burthen: 383 86/94 bm
- Length: 99 ft 11 1/2 in (30.5 m) (gundeck); 77 ft 2 in (23.5 m) (keel)
- Beam: 30 ft 7 in (9.3 m)
- Draught: 6 ft 0 in (1.8 m) (unladen); 11 ft 0 in (3.35 m) (laden)
- Depth of hold: 12 ft 9 in (3.89 m)
- Sail plan: Brig
- Complement: 121
- Armament: 16 × 32-pounder carronades; 2 × 6-pounder bow guns

HMS Scorpion was a Royal Navy Cruizer-class brig-sloop built by John King at Dover and launched in 1803. She was the first of the class to be built since the launching of Cruizer in 1797. Scorpion had a long and active career during the Napoleonic Wars, earning her crews three clasps to the Naval General Service Medal when the Admiralty authorized it in 1847, two for single-ship actions. She also took a number of prizes. Scorpion was sold in 1819.

== Service history ==
Scorpion was commissioned in November 1803 under Commander George Nicholas Hardinge for the Channel and the Downs. On 15 December the sloop Jane, Dedwith, master, was sailing from Liverpool to Cork when she ran foul of Scorpion near St David's Head and foundered. Scorpion rescued the crew and landed them at Waterford.

Scorpion's first medal action took place between 28 March and 3 April 1804.

=== Capture of the brig Atalanta ===
On 25 March 1804 Rear-Admiral Edward Thornbrough detached Scorpion to reconnoiter the Vlie Passage to the Texel. There Hardinge saw two Dutch national brigs at anchor, the closest being Atalanta. She mounted sixteen long 12-pounders and had 76 men on board. (Note: Atalanta had been launched on 3 September 1796 by Crul at Flushing and was a sister ship to Hippomenes, which the British had captured in the West Indies in 1803. The two sister ships were named for Atalanta and Hippomenes, two lovers from Greek mythology. Dutch records describer as having length 115 feet and breadth 32.75 feet. She was armed with 10 to 18 guns and had a crew of 99 men.)

On 31 March the 14-gun ship-sloop Beaver, under Commander Charles Pelly (or Pelley), arrived. That night Hardinge led five boats, three from Scorpion and two from Beaver, with about 60 officers and men, including Pelly, to attack Atalanta, which was under the command of Captain Carp. Hardinge was first on deck. The decks were slippery after rain and he fell as he tackled a mate of the watch but he recovered and killed the mate. Hardinge then engaged Carp, who disarmed Hardinge; Woodward Williams, Scorpion's master, saved Hardinge, who then called on Carp to surrender. Carp kept on fighting until the British killed him. This necessity greatly distressed Hardinge, who admired Carp's courage.

The Dutch finally surrendered after having lost their captain and three other men killed, and twelve officers and men wounded. All the British casualties were Scorpion's; she had five wounded, including Williams and Lieutenant Buckland Bluett. The British put forty of the Dutch into irons below deck and prepared to capture the other brig. However, a gale came up and at daybreak they saw that the gale had moved the vessels too far apart.

The gale lasted three days and until it passed it prevented the British from bringing Atalanta out. Eventually, the British sailed Atalanta back to Britain but did not take her into service.

On 2 May Hardinge buried Captain Carp with full military honours. Hardinge also freed the Dutch officers for the ceremony, one of whom performed a eulogy, and hoisted the Dutch colours. Thornbrough, under a flag of truce, sent Captain Carp's servant with Carp's effects to Batavian Admiral Killkert for forwarding to Carp's relations.

Hardinge was promoted to post-captain and given the command of Proselyte. (Note: Actually, he never took command of Proselyte. Instead, after some travails, he became captain of San Fiorenzo, on which he had served some 15 years earlier as a midshipman.) The Lloyd's Patriotic Fund awarded a sword worth 100 guineas to both Hardinge and Pelly. Bluett was promoted to Commander and the command of Wasp. He was one of the three lieutenants who also received a sword worth 50 guineas. In 1847 the Admiralty authorized the award of the Naval General Service Medal with clasps "Scorpion 31 March 1804" and "Beaver 31 March 1804", to any surviving claimants. (Note: Four former crewmen on Scorpion came forward to claim their medal and clasp. There were no claimants from Beaver.)

On 28 March Scorpion detained the brig Charlotte, for which she received prize money.

=== Capture of the privateer Eer ===
Commander Philip Carteret replaced Hardinge as captain of Scorpion in 1804. On 8 July Carteret captured five ships: Juno, Vrow Hermine, Anna Pieter Brouer, General Von Blucher, and Vrow Margaretha. Lloyd's List reported that Scorpion was in company with the sloop Lynx and the gun-brig Censor, and that together they captured 10 vessels that were sailing from Riga to Embden carrying masts. By this account the vessels they captured were: Vrow Hermina, Bowman, master; Juno, Gulzeet, master; Frau Margaretta, Roloff, master; General Van Bloucher, Ruyle, master; Jonge Oune & Brower, Ruyle, master; Four Brothers, Stemmings, master; Jonge Peter Caspar, Jobs, master; Gute Foffnung; and Piepersburg. The British sent their captives into Yarmouth.

On 2 August Scorpion, with the hired armed cutter Lord Nelson in company, captured the Prussian vessel Ignatius. Ignatius, or Ignatus, Bakker, master, was carrying masts from Riga when Scorpion detained her and sent her into Yarmouth.

Then on 11 April 1805, Scorpion, in company with the hired armed vessels Providence and Thames, captured the Dutch 12-gun privateer Eer (also known as De Eer, D'Eer or Honneur), under the command of Captain Antoine Doudet. (Note: Prize money for the capture was paid shortly after 11 November 1805.) She was carrying 1000 stands of arms, two 12-pounder field pieces, two mortars, uniforms for 1000 men, tents, and the like. She was also carrying M. Jean Saint-Faust who was traveling to Curaçao to assume command of the naval forces of the Batavian Republic.

Scorpion shared in the prize money for the Dorothea Elizabeth, which a squadron of eleven ships under the command of Admiral Russel had captured on 14 May.

=== Willaumez's squadron and protection of trade off St Kitts ===
Carteret received a promotion to post-captain on 22 January 1806, but Scorpion had just sailed to the Leeward Islands station and so it was some time before notification caught up with him. While on the Leeward Islands station, he shadowed Admiral Willaumez's squadron, coming close enough at one point to draw several cannon shots.

In July 1806 Carteret helped Captain Kenneth McKenzie of Carysfort save 65 deeply laden merchantmen at St. Kitts from destruction. Carteret sent a letter warning McKenzie that a French squadron under Admiral Willaumez had arrived at Martinique. Carysfort and the armed storeship Dolphin sailed leeward with their charges and so escaped the French, who had sailed from Fort Royal on 1 July. The French squadron succeeded in capturing three merchantmen at Montserrat and another three and a brig at Nevis; the fort on Brimstone Hill (St. Kitt's) and a battery on the beach protected nine others that had missed the convoy, though the French did attack them.

Commander Francis Stanfell had been appointed to command Scorpion on Carteret's promotion. However, he did not succeed in catching up with her until 1807. When Stanfell got to Barbados he found out that she had sailed to the North America station. After waiting some month in Barbados he received news that Scorpion was back at Plymouth and he sailed to join her.

=== Action against privateers on the Home Station ===
On 3 January 1807 Scorpion, still under the command of Carteret, was chasing a cutter some 15 miles south of The Lizard. Pickle came on the scene, made all sail, and succeeded in catching up with the quarry, with whom she exchanged two broadsides. Lieutenant Daniel Callaway of Pickle ran alongside the French vessel and his crew boarded and captured her. The French vessel was the privateer Favorite, of 14 guns and 70 men under the command of M. E. J. Boutruche. She was only two months old and had left Cherbourg two days before.

Out of her crew of 70 men, Favorite had lost one man killed and two wounded. Pickle had suffered two men severely wounded and one man slightly wounded. (Note: The Admiralty issued the Naval General Service Medal with clasp "Pickle 3 Jany. 1807" for this action.) When Scorpion caught up she took off the 69 prisoners, who she then landed at Falmouth.

Later that year Scorpion captured three French privateers while on the Home station. On 16 February it was Bougainville, some 12 miles south-west of the Isles of Scilly. She had 16 guns and 93 men and was 23 days out of Saint-Malo. Capturing her took a long chase and a 45-minute running fight during which the privateer lost several of crew killed; Scorpion had no casualties. (Note: A seaman's share of the bounty money was £3 5s 4 3/4d.)

Before she captured the other two privateers, Scorpion captured several merchant vessels. On 28 July while now under the command of Stanfell and with Dryad in company, she captured the Danish ship Trende Sostre and Hannah. Then one month later, on 28 August, still with Dryad in company, she captured Hanna, and Flora. On 4 September Scorpion captured Carl Von Plessen. On 12 September Scorpion captured Marianne. Because Scorpion was abroad, two-thirds of the prize money for Marianne and Carl von Plessen was paid to Greenwich Hospital.

On 18 September Scorpion was in company when Sir Edward Hughes captured Christle. Also on that day, Scorpion was in company with Plover when Scorpion captured Nicholini. Lastly, on 12 October Scorpion captured the Danish ship Gerhard while Saturn and Swiftsure were in sight.

Then on 21 November it was the turn of the second privateer, Glaneuse, to fall to Scorpion. Scorpion was about 100 miles south of Cape Clear and Stanfell had disguised her as a merchantman to lure privateers. That evening Stanfell succeeded in enticing the French privateer ketch Glaneuse to come within pistol range. Glaneuse was under the command of Louis Joseph Guinian, and carried 16 guns and 80 men. She was a new vessel, on her first cruise and ten days out of Saint-Malo. She had already taken two vessels: one was the ship Alfred bound for Poole from Newfoundland and the other was a Portuguese schooner that the privateer schooner Alarm had detained.

Lastly, on 3 December it was the privateer Glâneur's turn. Stanfell had obtained information from Glaneuse that enabled him to capture the privateer ketch Glâneur after a chase of 12 hours. She was under the command of M. Jaquel Fabre and had 10 guns and a crew of 60 men. She was 6 days out of Brest and had already taken two vessels: one was the brig Horatio, master David Mill, from London to Mogadore, and the other was the Portuguese Gloria, from Oporto to London. Glâneur had been preying on shipping for two years and had been the most successful privateer out of Saint-Malo. (Note: Glâneur was a 60-ton (of load), 14-gun privateer built in Saint-Malo in 1806 and commissioned in November 1806. She did a cruise under Louis-Joseph Quoniam with 65 men between November 1806 and March 1807. Circa September 1807 she departed under Fabre for the cruise during which Scorpion captured her.) British vessels had repeatedly chased her and she had repeatedly escaped by "superiority of sailing".

On 9 December 1806, Glâneur had captured the hired armed tender United Brothers, of four guns. In the fight, United Brothers had lost two men killed, one being her commander Lieutenant William McKenzie, and one man wounded.

On this cruise Glâneur had captured two vessels. One was the brig Horatio, David Mill, Master, which had been sailing from London to Mogadore. The other was the Portuguese ship Gloria, which had been sailing from Oporto to London.

On 24 December, Scorpion recaptured the Portuguese vessel Conde de Peniche.

=== Boat actions on the Leeward Islands station ===
Scorpion sailed to the Leeward Islands in 1807 and then returned home in 1808. She made at least one cruise to the coast of Portugal. On 24 May 1808 she captured Maria. Scorpion sailed again for the Leeward Island on 3 April 1809.

On 19 July 1809 Scorpion recaptured the American schooner Lucy, which a French privateer had captured off the Pearl Rock. Scorpion sent Lucy into Martinique.

At the end of 1809 Scorpion formed part of the squadron off Guadeloupe under Captain Volant Vashon Ballard of Blonde. On 25 September Blonde, Fawn, and Scorpion sent their boats after an enemy vessel making for Basse-Terre. (Note: In his letter reporting the action, Ballard in the margin names one of the three vessels Facon. However Winfield (2008) has no record of any British naval vessel with the name Facon. A later head-money notice makes clear that the vessel was Fawn. One suspects a transcription error in going from Ballard's writing to type setting for the Gazette.) To escape her pursuers, their quarry ran herself ashore in a bay between two batteries. The boat parties reached the French vessel despite cross-fire from the batteries and in the face of small arms fire from men on the beach. However, the British were unable to get the French vessel off. Instead, as she was bilged, they simply left. British casualties amounted to two men wounded from Blonde, one of whom lost an arm and the other of whom later died.

On 15 December Scorpion sailed from Basseterre with a small squadron in search of a French squadron reported to be in the area. In subsequent days two sloops and two frigates joined the squadron. One of the sloops was Ringdove, a sister-ship to Scorpion. Though a part of the squadron, Scorpion apparently missed out on the Action of 17 December 1809 in which a British squadron, first under Vashon Ballard and then under Captain Samuel James Ballard, destroyed two French frigates.

=== Capture of the brig Oreste ===
On 11 January 1810, Captain Vollant Ballard detached Stanfell to attempt to cut out a French brig anchored near the shore. At about 9pm Scorpion spotted the 16-gun French brig Oreste clearing the north point of the bay. Stanfell set off in pursuit. During the chase Scorpion's crew had to use her sweeps before she could close with Oreste at about 11:30pm. The action lasted for two to two-and-a-half hours, with Scorpion exposed to fire from the shore, before Oreste, which had been dismasted, struck her colours at 1:30am on 12 January. At this point a barge from Blonde arrived and assisted in the capture.

Scorpion had four men wounded during the action; the French losses were two killed and ten wounded, including her captain. Oreste was armed with fourteen 24-pounder carronades and two long 12-pounders and carried a crew of 110 men. (Note: Oreste had been built to a design by Notaire Granville and was launched at Le Havre in 1805.) She had sailed from Bordeaux for Guadeloupe on 18 November 1809. She was under the command of lieutenant de vaisseau Monnier and was bound for France with a lieutenant-colonel and two other army officers and the captains and other officers from two French frigates as passengers. In addition to Blonde, Thetis and Pultusk also shared in the prize money by agreement.

Oreste was a new vessel so the Royal Navy took her into service as HMS Wellington. However, the Navy never commissioned Wellington and she was broken up in 1812. In 1847 the Admiralty issued the Naval General Service Medal with clasp "Scorpion 12 Jany. 1810" to the surviving claimants from the action.

=== Guadeloupe ===
Scorpion took part in the attack on Guadeloupe at the end of January 1810. Stanfell and a detachment of seamen served ashore with the 2nd division of the army under Brigadier General Harcourt. The French capitulated on 6 February and Scorpion then left for England on 10 February with Admiral Alexander Cochrane's dispatches; Stanfell arrived at the Admiralty Office on 15 March. In 1847 the Admiralty issued the Naval General Service Medal with clasp "Guadaloupe".

=== Late career ===
Commander the Honorable John Gore took command in April 1810 and returned Scorpion to the Leeward Islands. While she was sailing to the windward of Martinique, she encountered a heavy squall. The squall broke some of her masts and swept three seamen overboard. Gore saw them struggling and jumped into the sea to rescue them. He succeeded in rescuing two; the third man was exhausted from battling the waves and drowned.

Ironically, Gore drowned on 18 February 1812, off the coast of Africa. A seaman had fallen overboard and Gore again jumped in to save the man. The ship's boats attempted to save him but one swamped before it could come to the rescue, and he capsized a second trying to climb in. The cutter was able to rescue the men from the second boat, but Gore and the seaman he had tried to save were already lost.

Commander Robert Giles took command on 12 March 1812 on the Leeward Islands station. On 29 March 1813 Scorpion captured the Gustavus. On 8 May 1813 Scorpion sailed with a convoy to England that reached Plymouth on 28 June.

== Fate ==
Scorpion was laid up at Sheerness in July 1813. She was sold there to G.F. Young for £1,100 on 3 February 1819.
