= French frigate Piémontaise =

Consolante-class frigate of the Royal Navy

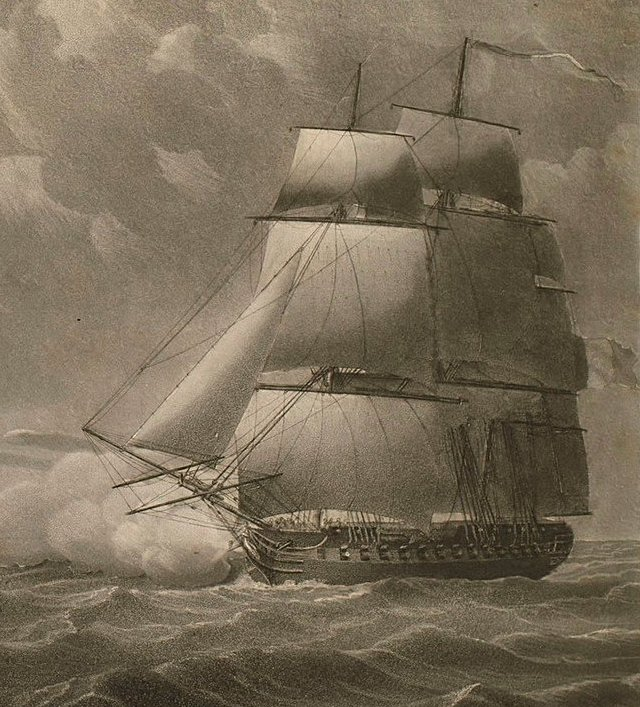
- Piémontaise in 1806

History

France
- Name: Piémontaise
- Namesake: Piedmont
- Builder: Saint Malo
- Laid down: 22 March 1803
- Launched: 15 December 1804
- Commissioned: 23 September 1805 at Saint Servan
- Captured: 8 March 1808

United Kingdom
- Name: Piedmontaise
- Acquired: 8 March 1808
- Fate: Broken up in 1813

General characteristics
- Class & type: Consolante-class frigate
- Displacement: 1400 tons (French)
- Tons burthen: 109183/94 (bm)
- Length: 157 ft 5 in (47.98 m) (overall); 128 ft 10 in (39.27 m) (keel)
- Beam: 39 ft 11 in (12.17 m)
- Draught: 6.17 m (20.2 ft)
- Depth of hold: 12 ft 8 in (3.86 m)
- Propulsion: Sail
- Armament: Originally; UD: 28 × 18-pounder long guns; Spardeck: 14 × 36-pounder obusiers + 4 × 8-pounder guns; French service; UD: 28 × 18-pounder long guns; QD: 12 × 8-pounder long guns; Fc: 4 × 32-pounder carronades; British service; UD:28 × 18-pounder guns; QD:14 × 32-pounder carronades; Fc:2 × 9-pounder guns + 2 × 32-pounder carronades

Piémontaise was a 40-gun Consolante-class frigate of the French Navy. She served as a commerce raider in the Indian Ocean until her capture by the Royal Navy in March 1808. Commissioned into the British navy as HMS Piedmontaise, she served in the East Indies until she was broken up in England in 1813.

== French service ==
Piémontaise was built by Enterprise Étheart at Saint Malo to a design by François Pastel.

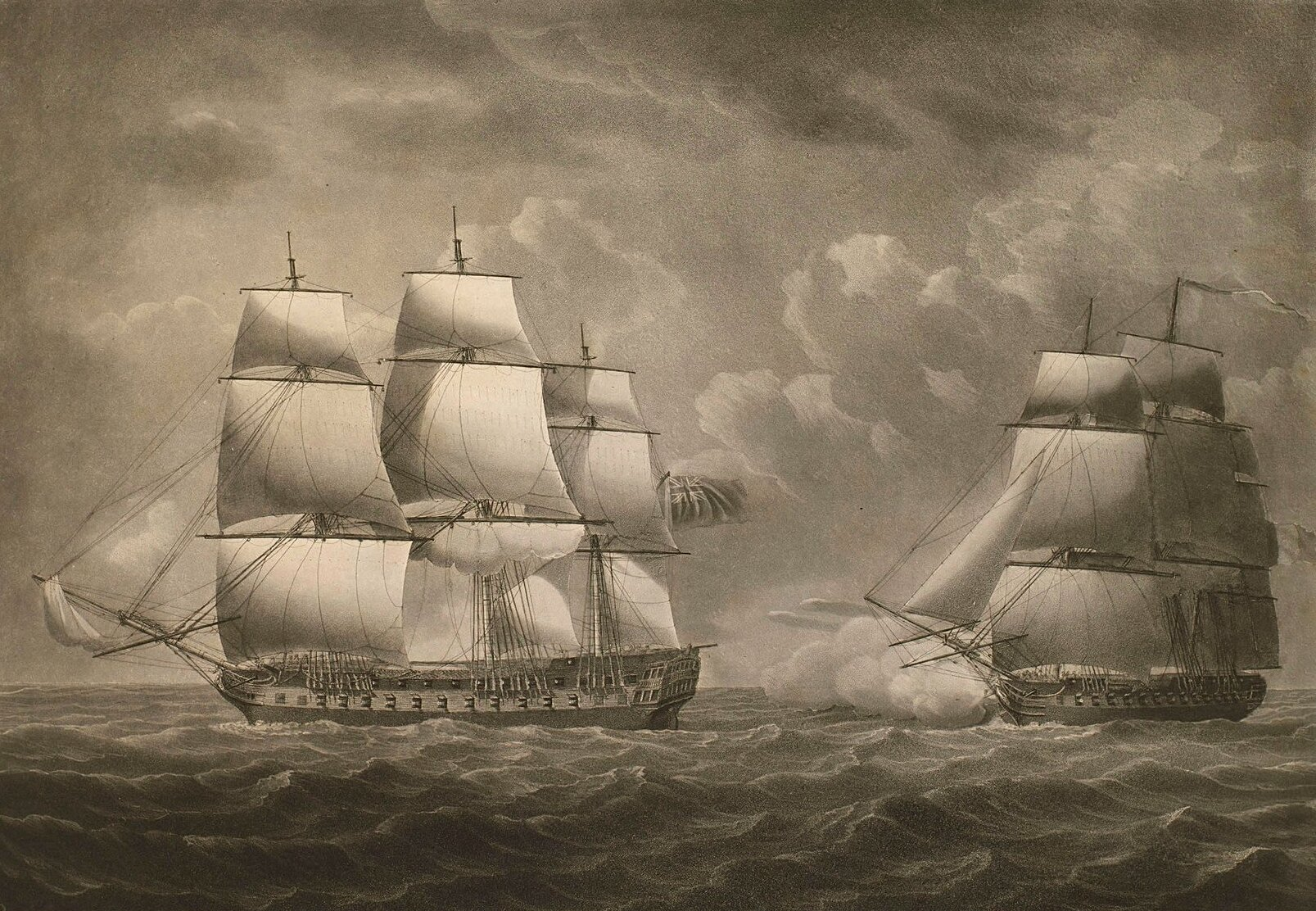
Engraving by Robert Dodd of Piémontaise capturing Warren Hastings on 21 June 1806

On 18 December 1805, she sailed from Brest for Île de France. There she served as a commerce raider under captain Jacques Epron. On 21 June 1806, she captured the East Indiaman Warren Hastings. On 6 September, she captured the 14-gun East India Company brig HCS Grappler, the three-masted country ship Atomany, and the East Indiaman Fame.

Between September and October 1807, Piémontaise captured Caroline, Eggleton or Eggleson, master, Sarah, Henderson, master, Maria, James, master, Udny, Walteas or Wallis, master, Danneberg or Danesburgh or Castel Dansborg, Winter, master, Highland Chief, Mahapice or Makepiece, master, Eliza, Sparkes, master, and Calcutta. Calcutta was a "native ship". Captain James, of Maria, died aboard Piémontaise on 29 September.

Piémontaise captured Resource on 9 October 1807. She was carrying toile and 7,500 sacks of rice. The value of the prize was 215,930.24 francs.

In early March 1808, Piémontaise captured three more merchantmen off Southern India.

== Capture ==
On 6 March 1808, Piémontaise encountered HMS St Fiorenzo. The two ships battled for three days until Piémontaise, out of ammunition and having suffered heavy casualties, had to strike her colours on 8 March. The evening before she struck, Lieutenant de vaisseau Charles Moreau, who had been severely wounded, threw himself into the sea. Captain Hardinge, of St Fiorenzo, was killed in the fighting on the last day. Over the three days the British suffered 13 dead and 25 wounded. The French suffered some 48 dead and 112 wounded.

Lieutenant William Dawson took command and brought both vessels back to Colombo, even though Piémontaise's three masts fell over her side early in the morning of 9 March. Piémontaise had on board British Army officers and captains and officers from prizes that she had taken. These men helped organize the lascars to jury-rig masts and bring Piémontaise into port. St Fiorenzo had too few men, too many casualties, and too many prisoners to guard to provide much assistance. In 1847, the Admiralty awarded the Naval General Service Medal with clasp "San Fiorenzo 8 March 1808" to any surviving claimants from the action.

== British service ==
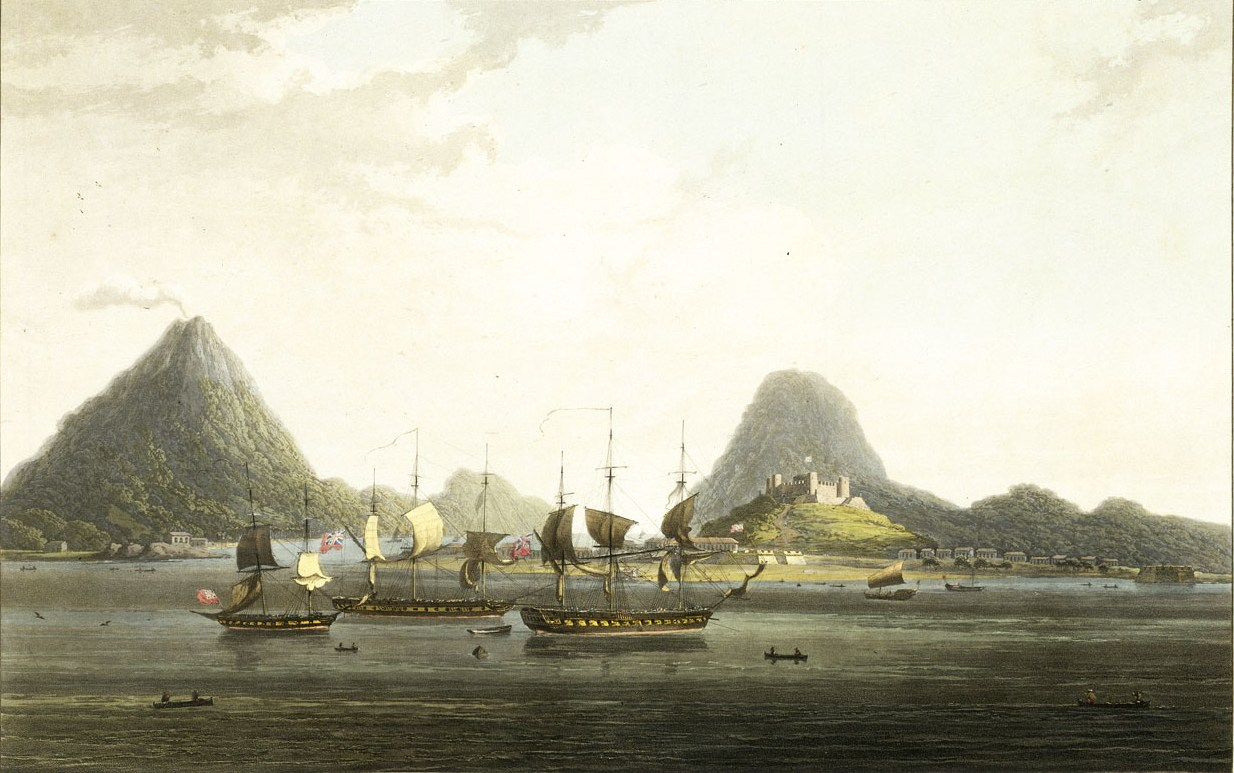
View of Banda Neira, depicting three of the four ships used to capture the island from the Dutch in 1810, from a sketch by Capt. Cole of HMS Caroline

The British brought Piémontaise into service as HMS Piedmontaise, commissioning her under Captain Charles Foote. From May to August 1810, she took part in the successful expedition to the Banda Islands, along with Caroline and Barracouta. The expedition also included Mandarin.

Foote died in September and Commander Henry D. Dawson replaced him, only to die shortly thereafter. (Note: A newspaper report states that it was Captain William Dawson who was Piedmontaise's captain. He died on 28 September 1811 at Madras, aged 29.) Piedmontaise's next captain was T. Epworth, who was replaced in turn by Captain Henry Edgell.

== Fate ==
Piémontaise was taken out of commission at Woolwich on 12 August 1812. She was broken up in January 1813.
