= Resource (1804 ship) =

History

United Kingdom
- Name: Resource
- Builder: Matthew Smith, Calcutta
- Launched: 12 February 1804
- Fate: Abandoned at sea by her crew 26 December 1846

General characteristics
- Tons burthen: 350, 385, or 39040/94, or 417 (bm)
- Length: 109 ft 2 in (33.3 m)
- Beam: 29 ft 2 in (8.9 m)
- Sail plan: Ship-rigged, later barque

Resource was launched in Calcutta in 1804 as a country ship; that is, she traded out of India but only east of the Cape of Good Hope. In 1807 the French captured her, but she returned to British ownership. She participated as a transport in the British invasion of Java. After 1813 she traded between Britain and India under a license from the British East India Company (EIC). From about the mid-1830s she traded primarily between Britain and Australia, and in 1839 she transported immigrants to South Australia. In 1843 she started sailing between Britain and Quebec until December 1846 when her crew had to abandon her at sea while on a voyage back to Britain from Quebec.

== Career ==
Resource first appeared in readily available online sources in 1807 when the French frigate Piémontaise captured Resource (of 480 tons), on 9 October 1807. Resource was carrying toile and 7,500 sacks of rice. The value of the prize was 215,930.24 francs. Resource returned to British ownership; she was registered at Calcutta prior to January 1811.

Resource was one of the transport vessels supporting the British Invasion of Java (1811).

In 1813 the EIC had lost its monopoly on the trade between India and Britain. British ships were then free to sail to India or the Indian Ocean under a license from the EIC.

Resource, James Henderson, master, arrived at Batavia on 31 October 1814 from Bengal and Bencooolen. She sailed from Java on 12 December 1814 for London and the Cape of Good Hope.

Resource first appeared in Lloyd's Register (LR) in 1815.

Year	Master	Owner	Trade	Source & notes
1815	Henderson	Bonham	London–Bengal	LR
1822	Henderson; Fenn	Bonham	London–Bengal	LR; good repair 1819

In 1822 Resource was sold for a "Free Trader".

In 1813 the EIC lost its monopoly on the trade between India and Britain. British ships were then free to sail to India or the Indian Ocean under a license from the EIC.

Year	Master	Owner	Trade	Source & notes
1823	Fenn	Fenn	London–Fort William, India	LR; good repair 1819
1826	Tomlin; Fenn	B.Fenn	London–Calcutta	LR; good repair 1819
1830	B.Fenn; G.Stoddard	B.Fenn	London–Calcutta; London–Cape of Good Hope	LR; good repair 1819 & small repairs 1828
1830	[Henry] Shuttleworth	Watson & Co.	London–Van Diemen's Land	LR (Supple.); good repair 1819 & small repairs 1828
1832	Shuttleworth; Warren	Watson & Co.	London–Van Diemen's Land	LR; good repair 1819 & small repairs 1828
1834	Warren	Watson & Co.	London	LR; good repair 1819 & small repairs 1828
1835	Coombes		London	LR
1836	J.Coombes	T.Ward	London	LR
1837		T.Ward	London	LR
1839	W.Boyle	T.Ward	London–South Australia	LR

Resource, W.Boyle, master, left London on 7 October 1838 and arrived at Adelaide on 23 January 1839 with 211 passengers. She sailed on to Port Phillip, returning to Adelaide on 13 May having lost 2280 out of the 2700 sheep she was carrying.

Year	Master	Owner	Trade	Source & notes
1842	W.Boyle	T.Ward	London–New South Wales; London	LR; small repairs 1840 & 1842
1843	W.Boyle; Lewis	T.Ward	London; London–Africa; Liverpool–Quebec	LR; small repairs 1840 & 1842

== Fate ==
Resource was lost in 1846. On 26 December 1846, her crew abandoned their barque in the Atlantic Ocean; Georgiana rescued the crew. Resource was on a voyage from Quebec City to London. The volume of LR for 1846 carried the annotation "LOST" by her name.
