= List of shipwrecks in 1812 =

The list of shipwrecks in 1812 includes ships sunk, wrecked or otherwise lost during 1812.

table of contents
1812
Jan	Feb	Mar	Apr
May	Jun	Jul	Aug
Sep	Oct	Nov	Dec
Unknown date

== January ==
=== 2 January ===
List of shipwrecks: 2 January 1812
Ship	State	Description
Lady Alice	United Kingdom	The schooner was wrecked on the Barbary Coast. All nine people on board survived the wreck only to have the local inhabitants kill them. She was on a voyage from Sicily to London.
Sarah and Mary	United Kingdom	The ship was wrecked on the coast of Africa. Her crew survived. She was on a voyage from Sicily to London.

=== 3 January ===
List of shipwrecks: 3 January 1812
Ship	State	Description
Alfred	United States	The ship was wrecked near Cape Ann, Massachusetts. She was on a voyage from Saint Petersburg, Russia to Boston, Massachusetts.
Cleopatra	United Kingdom	The ship departed from Tenerife, Canary Islands for Leith, Lothian. No further trace, presumed foundered with the loss of all hands.
John	United Kingdom	The ship was lost near Robin Hoods Bay, Yorkshire. Her crew were rescued. She was on a voyage from Newhaven, Sussex to Sunderland, County Durham.

=== 5 January ===
List of shipwrecks: 5 January 1812
Ship	State	Description
Portland	United States	The ship was captured and burnt off Cádiz, Spain. She was on a voyage from Philadelphia, Pennsylvania, to Cádiz.

=== 7 January ===
List of shipwrecks: 7 January 1812
Ship	State	Description
Clifford	United Kingdom	Napoleonic Wars: The ship was captured off St. Lucar, Spain while on a voyage from Limerick to Cádiz. She was subsequently lost.
Speedwell	United Kingdom	The ship was driven ashore at New Romney, Kent. She was on a voyage from Waterford to London. Speedwell was refloated on 11 January and taken in to Dover, Kent.
William	United Kingdom	The ship ran aground in the River Liffey and was severely damaged. She was on a voyage from Dublin to Barbados.

=== 11 January ===
List of shipwrecks: 11 January 1812
Ship	State	Description
Duchess of Gordon	United Kingdom	The ship was driven ashore near Banff, Aberdeenshire.

=== 12 January ===
List of shipwrecks: 12 January 1812
Ship	State	Description
William Scott	United Kingdom	The schooner was lost at Madeira. She was on a voyage from Plymouth, Devon to the West Indies.

=== 13 January ===
List of shipwrecks: 13 January 1812
Ship	State	Description
Content's Increase	United Kingdom	The ship struck the Cross Sand, in the North Sea off the coast of Norfolk and foundered. Her crew were rescued.
Neutrality	United States	The ship was wrecked on Cats Key, Bahamas. She was on a voyage from Jamaica to Savannah, Georgia.

=== 14 January ===
List of shipwrecks: 16 January 1812
Ship	State	Description
Queen Charlotte	United Kingdom	The packet ship was driven ashore and wrecked at San Sebastián, Spain with the loss of all sixteen crew on board.

=== 16 January ===
List of shipwrecks: 16 January 1812
Ship	State	Description
Commerce	United Kingdom	The ship was driven ashore and wrecked in Holyhead Bay. She was on a voyage from Whitehaven, Cumberland to Waterford.

=== 17 January ===
List of shipwrecks: 17 January 1812
Ship	State	Description
Charles Fox	United Kingdom	The ship departed from Great Yarmouth, Norfolk for Heligoland. No further trace, presumed foundered with the loss of all hands.

=== 18 January ===
List of shipwrecks: 18 January 1812
Ship	State	Description
Amalthea	United Kingdom	The ship was driven ashore at the mouth of the St. Petre River. She was on a voyage from Cádiz, Spain to Gibraltar.
Eagle	United Kingdom	The ship was driven ashore near Coulderton, Cumberland. Her crew were rescued.
Portland	United Kingdom	The ship was driven ashore near Ravenglass, Cumberland. Her crew were rescued.

=== 19 January ===
List of shipwrecks: 19 January 1812
Ship	State	Description
Badger	United Kingdom	The ship was driven ashore in Portrush Bay. Her crew survived.
Lively	United Kingdom	The ship departed from Lisbon, Portugal for Greenock, Renfrewshire. No further trace, presumed foundered with the loss of all hands.

=== 20 January ===
List of shipwrecks: 20 January 1812
Ship	State	Description
Fortitude	United Kingdom	The ship foundered in the Atlantic Ocean (50°20′N 7°25′W). Her crew were rescued by Charlotte (United Kingdom). Fortitude was on a voyage from Dublin to Cádiz, Spain.
Juno	United Kingdom	The ship was driven ashore at Aldeburgh, Suffolk.

=== 21 January ===
List of shipwrecks: 21 January 1812
Ship	State	Description
Caroline	(Denmark) Norway	The ship was wrecked on Sanday, Orkney Islands with the loss of all hands.

=== 22 January ===
List of shipwrecks: 22 January 1812
Ship	State	Description
Joseph and Phœbe	United Kingdom	The ship was driven ashore and wrecked at South Hempstead, New York United States. Her crew were rescued. She was on a voyage from Londonderry to New York City.

=== 25 January ===
List of shipwrecks: 25 January 1812
Ship	State	Description
Jane and Betsey	United Kingdom	The ship foundered in the North Sea off Berwick upon Tweed. Her crew were rescued. She was on a voyage from Sunderland, County Durham to Leith, Lothian.

=== 26 January ===
List of shipwrecks: 26 January 1812
Ship	State	Description
HM Hired armed brig Black Prince	Royal Navy	The hired armed brig was wrecked at Gerace, Kingdom of Sicily with the loss of two of her 58 crew. The survivors were taken prisoner.
HMS Carlotta	Royal Navy	The brig-corvette was driven ashore and wrecked at Capo Passaro, Sicily.
Chatham	United Kingdom	The transport ship was driven ashore and wrecked at Palermo, Sicily.
Magnum Bonum	United Kingdom	The transport ship was driven ashore and wrecked at Palermo.
Maria	United Kingdom	The ship was driven ashore in the Isles of Scilly. She was on a voyage from Liverpool to Porto, Portugal. Maria was refloated on 14 March and taken in to St. Mary's, Isles of Scilly.

=== 27 January ===
List of shipwrecks: 27 January 1812
Ship	State	Description
Comet	United States	Napoleonic Wars: The ship was captured by a French privateer. She was subsequently lost off Fécamp, Seine-Inférieure, France.
Dubordieu	France	The privateer was lost in Bizerta Bay.
Peace	United Kingdom	The ship was driven ashore near Wexford. Her crew were rescued. She was on a voyage from Swansea, Glamorgan to Dublin.

=== 28 January ===
List of shipwrecks: 28 January 1812
Ship	State	Description
Charlotte	United Kingdom	The ship was driven ashore at Penzance, Cornwall. She was on a voyage from Lisbon, Portugal to Bristol, Gloucestershire. Charlotte was later refloated and taken in to Penzance.
Elizabeth	United Kingdom	The ship was driven ashore at Falmouth, Cornwall. She was later refloated.
Jemima	United Kingdom	The ship was driven ashore at Falmouth. She was on a voyage from London to São Miguel Island, Azores.
HMS Manilla	Royal Navy	The frigate was wrecked on the Haaks Sand, in the North Sea off Texel, North Holland, First French Empire with the loss of six or 36 of her crew. Two hundred and forty-three survivors were taken prisoner.
Maria	United Kingdom	The ship ran aground on the North Bull, in the Irish Sea off Dublin.
Providence	United Kingdom	The ship was driven out to sea and was abandoned off Penzance. She was later brought back in to port by some pilots. Providence was on a voyage from Portsmouth, Hampshire to Swansea, Glamorgan.
Sir Francis Baring	United Kingdom	The ship was driven ashore at Falmouth.
Victory	United Kingdom	The ship ran aground on the North Bull. She sank the next day. Her crew were rescued.
Watt	United Kingdom	The ship was driven ashore and damaged at Falmouth. She was on a voyage from London to St. Thomas, Virgin Islands. Watt was later refloated.

=== 29 January ===
List of shipwrecks: 29 January 1812
Ship	State	Description
Adventure	United Kingdom	The ship was driven ashore in Tor Bay and was wrecked.
Badger	United Kingdom	The ship was driven ashore and wrecked at Portrush, County Antrim.
Indefatigable	United Kingdom	The transport ship was driven ashore in Pwllheli Bay. She was on a voyage from Portsmouth, Hampshire to Cork.
Isabella	United Kingdom	The ship was wrecked on the Isle of Man. Her crew were rescued. She was on a voyage from Cork to Liverpool.

=== 31 January ===
List of shipwrecks: 31 January 1812
Ship	State	Description
HMS Laurel	Royal Navy	The fifth rate was wrecked in Quiberon Bay. Her crew were rescued, but made prisoners of war.

=== Unknown date ===
List of shipwrecks: Unknown date in January 1812
Ship	State	Description
Alligator	United Kingdom	The ship was run ashore on the coast of Surinam in mid-January. She was on a voyage from Portsmouth, Hampshire to Cayenne.
Asia	United States	The ship was captured and burnt by Andromaque and Herald and Mameluke (all French Navy). Asia was on a voyage from Philadelphia, Pennsylvania, to Lisbon, Portugal.
Chance	United Kingdom	The ship foundered in the Atlantic Ocean off Maranhão, Brazil. She was on a voyage from Rio de Janeiro to Maranhão.
Constance	United Kingdom	The ship was driven ashore and wrecked near Cape St Mary, Portugal. She was on a voyage from Cádiz, Spain to Liverpool.
Courier	United Kingdom	The ship was lost near Sunderland, County Durham.
Gershom	United States	The ship was captured and burnt by Andromaque and Herald and Mameluke (all French Navy). Gershom was on a voyage from Boston, Massachusetts, to Porto, Portugal.
Justicia	United Kingdom	The transport ship was lost near Figueira da Foz, Portugal.
Lion	United Kingdom	The ship was lost in the Bay of Bona with the loss of three of her crew. She was on a voyage from La Cala de Mijas, Spain to Gibraltar.
Margaret	United Kingdom	The ship was in collision with another vessel in the North Sea and was abandoned by her crew. She was taken in to Heligoland on 16 January by HMS Exertion (Royal Navy). Margaret was on a voyage from Heligoland to London.
Maria	United Kingdom	The ship was lost on the French coast. She was on a voyage from Gibraltar to London.
Mary	United Kingdom	Napoleonic Wars: The ship was captured and burnt by a French privateer. She was on a voyage from Lisbon to London.
Nancy	United Kingdom	The ship was lost off Liverpool, Nova Scotia, British North America in mid-January.
Peggy	United Kingdom	The sloop was wrecked off Islay, Inner Hebrides. She was on a voyage from Sligo to Greenock, Renfrewshire.
Pocohantus	France	The ship was wrecked at Calais at the end of January.
Regent	United Kingdom	The ship was run ashore on the coast of Surinam in mid-January. She was on a voyage from Newfoundland, British North America to Surinam.
Success	United Kingdom	The ship was driven ashore at North Meols, Lancashire. She was on a voyage from Cork to Liverpool.
Traveller	United Kingdom	The transport ship was driven ashore near Figueira da Foz, Portugal. She was later refloated.
Two Friends	United Kingdom	The whaler was lost on the coast of Iceland.
Unnamed	Spain	The brig was abandoned at sea. She was on a voyage from Bristol, Gloucestershire, United Kingdom to A Coruña. She was discovered by HMS Semiramis Royal Navy and take in to Plymouth, Devon, United Kingdom.

== February ==
=== 1 February ===
List of shipwrecks: 1 February 1812
Ship	State	Description
Ranter	United Kingdom	The ship departed from Cork for Falmouth, Cornwall. No further trace, presumed foundered with the loss of all hands.

=== 2 February ===
List of shipwrecks: 2 February 1812
Ship	State	Description
HMS Conqueror	Royal Navy	The third rate ship of the line was driven ashore between Sheerness and Chatham, Kent.
Elizabeth	United Kingdom	The ship was driven ashore and sank near Walmer Castle, Kent. She was on a voyage from London to Plymouth, Devon. Elizabeth was later refloated and taken in to Ramsgate, Kent.
Elizabeth	United Kingdom	The ship was driven ashore at Dungeness, Kent. She was on a voyage from London to Saint Vincent. Elizabeth was later refloated and was reported as heading for Portsmouth, Hampshire.
Richard	United Kingdom	The ship was driven ashore in St. Austell Bay. She was on a voyage from Plymouth to Hayle, Cornwall.
Totnes	United Kingdom	The ship ran aground on the Knock Sand, off the coast of Kent and was damaged. She was later refloated and taken in to Sheerness. Totnes was on a voyage from London to Dartmouth, Devon.
Wilhelmina	United Kingdom	The ship ran aground on the Knock Sand. She was on a voyage from London to Spain. Wilhelmina was later refloated and taken in to the River Thames.

=== 6 February ===
List of shipwrecks: 6 February 1812
Ship	State	Description
Fortitude	United Kingdom	The ship struck the pier at St Ives, Cornwall and sank.

=== 7 February ===
List of shipwrecks: 7 February 1812
Ship	State	Description
Eliza	United Kingdom	The sloop was run down and sunk in the English Channel off the Dodman Point by a brig. Her crew were rescued.
James and Ann	United Kingdom	The ship was run down and sunk by a collier brig at Dublin. Her crew were rescued.

=== 10 February ===
List of shipwrecks: 10 February 1812
Ship	State	Description
Hope	United Kingdom	The ship was wrecked at St Alban's Head, Dorset. She was on a voyage from São Miguel, Azores to London

=== 12 February ===
List of shipwrecks: 12 February 1812
Ship	State	Description
Hornet	United Kingdom	The ship was lost at the mouth of the Kennebec River, United States.
Sally	United Kingdom	The ship was wrecked on the coast of the Isle of Man. Her crew were rescued. She was on a voyage from Liverpool to Cork.

=== 13 February ===
List of shipwrecks: 13 February 1812
Ship	State	Description
Adventure	United Kingdom	The ship ran aground on the Newcombe Sand, in the North Sea off the coast of Norfolk. She was on a voyage from London to Leeds, Yorkshire. She was refloated and taken in to Great Yarmouth, Norfolk.

=== 14 February ===
List of shipwrecks: 14 February 1812
Ship	State	Description
Rose	United Kingdom	The sloop was run down and sunk off Spittal Point by the brig Ocean (United Kingdom). Her crew were rescued. She was on a voyage from Leith, Lothian to Newcastle upon Tyne, Northumberland.
Three Brothers	United Kingdom	The ship was driven ashore at Milford, Pembrokeshire. She was on a voyage from Liverpool to Malta. Three Brothers was later refloated.
Three Sisters	United Kingdom	The ship was driven ashore near Broadstairs, Kent. She was later refloated and taken in to Broadstairs. Three Sisters was on a voyage from London to Brighton, Sussex.

=== 15 February ===
List of shipwrecks: 15 February 1812
Ship	State	Description
Esperanza	Flag unknown	The ship was wrecked on Anegada, Virgin Islands.
Henry	United Kingdom	Napoleonic Wars: The ship was driven ashore at Beachy Head, Sussex in an engagement with a French privateer and was wrecked. Her crew survived. She was on a voyage from Southampton, Hampshire to South Shields, County Durham.
Industry	United Kingdom	The ship was abandoned in the North Sea off Great Yarmouth, Norfolk. She was taken in to Great Yarmouth. Industry was on a voyage from Boston, Lincolnshire to London.

=== 16 February ===
List of shipwrecks: 16 February 1812
Ship	State	Description
Hibbell	United Kingdom	The collier collided with another collier off Flamborough Head, Yorkshire and was severely damaged. She was taken in to Whitby, Yorkshire for repairs.

=== 17 February ===
List of shipwrecks: 17 February 1812
Ship	State	Description
Peace and Plenty	United Kingdom	The ship foundered in the Boston Deeps. Her crew were rescued. She was on a voyage from Hull, Yorkshire to London.

=== 18 February ===
List of shipwrecks: 18 February 1812
Ship	State	Description
Thetis	United Kingdom	The snow ran aground on the Planter Sand, in the North Sea off Harwich, Essex and was wrecked. Her crew were rescued. She was on a voyage from Hull, Yorkshire to London.
Twin Sisters	United States	The ship was wrecked in the Abaco Islands, Bahamas. Her crew were rescued. She was on a voyage from Baltimore, Maryland to Havana, Cuba.
Unity	United Kingdom	The ship was wrecked at Harwich. She was on a voyage from Sunderland, County Durham to London.

== =19 February ==
List of shipwrecks: 19 February 1812
Ship	State	Description
Ulysses	United Kingdom	The brig ran aground on the Scroby Sands, in the North Sea off the coast of Norfolk. She was refloated.

=== 20 February ===
List of shipwrecks: 20 February 1812
Ship	State	Description
Charlotte	United Kingdom	The ship was driven ashore near Swansea, Glamorgan.
John and William	United Kingdom	The ship was wrecked near the Mull of Galloway, Wigtownshire. Her crew were rescued. She was on a voyage from Liverpool to Sligo, Ireland.
Orion	United States	The ship was wrecked on the Florida Reef. She was on a voyage from Aux Cayes, Haiti to Philadelphia, Pennsylvania.
Young Charles	United Kingdom	The ship departed Lisbon, Portugal for London. No further trace, presumed foundered with the loss of all hands.

=== 21 February ===
List of shipwrecks: 21 February 1812
Ship	State	Description
Blackbird	United Kingdom	The ship was driven ashore south of South Shields, County Durham. Her crew were rescued.
Endeavour	United Kingdom	The ship was driven ashore at Blyth, Northumberland. Her crew were rescued.
Fox	United Kingdom	The schooner was driven ashore and wrecked at Bridport, Dorset. Her crew were rescued. She was on a voyage from London to Exeter, Devon.
Henrietta	United Kingdom	The smack was driven ashore and wrecked at Bridport. She was on a voyage from London to Bridport.
Jane	United Kingdom	The ship put in to Milford Haven, Pembrokeshire in a sinking condition. She was on a voyage from Bury, Lancashire to Cork.
Juno	United Kingdom	The ship was driven ashore at Waterford. She was on a voyage from Barnstaple, Devon to Irvine, Ayrshire. Juno was later refloated and resumed her voyage.
Unnamed	Spain	The ship was wrecked in the Isles of Scilly, United Kingdom.

=== 22 February ===
List of shipwrecks: 22 February 1812
Ship	State	Description
Cumberland	United Kingdom	The ship was driven ashore north of North Shields, Northumberland with the loss of all hands.
Themis	United Kingdom	The ship was driven ashore at Cullercoats, Northumberland. She was later refloated and taken in to Blyth, Northumberland for repairs.

=== 23 February ===
List of shipwrecks: 23 February 1812
Ship	State	Description
Cynthia	United Kingdom	The ship was wrecked on the coast of Alderney, Channel Islands.
John and Mary	United Kingdom	The ship was driven ashore north of South Shields, County Durham. Her crew were rescued.
Salus	United Kingdom	The ship was driven ashore north of Sunderland, County Durham. Her crew were rescued.

=== 24 February ===
List of shipwrecks: 24 February 1812
Ship	State	Description
Britannia	(United Kingdom of Great Britain and Ireland) Guernsey	The ship sank at Ramsgate, Kent.

=== 25 February ===
List of shipwrecks: 25 February 1812
Ship	State	Description
Britannia	United Kingdom	The ship was wrecked in Duddon Bay. Her crew were rescued. She was on a voyage from Strangford, County Down to Liverpool.
Rapid	United Kingdom	The ship ran aground on the Brake Sand, in the North Sea and was abandoned by her crew. She was on a voyage from Great Yarmouth, Norfolk to Malta. Rapid was later refloated and taken in to Ramsgate, Kent.
Thetis	United Kingdom	The ship was wrecked on the Platter Sand, in the North Sea off the coast of Essex. Her crew were rescued. She was on a voyage from South Shields, County Durham to London.
Unity	United Kingdom	The ship was wrecked at Harwich, Essex, She was on a voyage from Sunderland, County Durham to London.

=== 26 February ===
List of shipwrecks: 26 February 1812
Ship	State	Description
John and Mary	United Kingdom	The ship was wrecked on the Broad Sound Rocks, Isles of Scilly. Her crew were rescued. She was on a voyage from Porto, Portugal to Cork.
Mentor	United Kingdom	Napoleonic Wars: The ship was captured off St. Alban's Head, Dorset by two French lugger privateers. She was abandoned when HMRC Duke of York ( Board of Customs) made an appearance. Mentor was taken in to the Motherbank.

=== 27 February ===
List of shipwrecks: 27 February 1812
Ship	State	Description
Fame	United Kingdom	The ship was abandoned in the Atlantic Ocean. Her crew were rescued by Henry (United Kingdom). Fame was on a voyage from Philadelphia, Pennsylvania, United States to an Irish port.
Francis	United Kingdom	The ship was driven ashore at Poole, Dorset. She was on a voyage from Poole to Liverpool. Francis was later refloated.
Lord Duplin	United Kingdom	The ship was driven ashore at Poole. She was on a voyage from Poole to Liverpool. Lord Duplin was later refloated.

=== 28 February ===
List of shipwrecks: 28 February 1812
Ship	State	Description
HMS Fly	Royal Navy	The sloop-of-war ran aground on The Knobber Reef, off Anholt, Denmark. She was set afire by her crew the next day before they were rescued.
William and Ann	United Kingdom	The ship ran aground at Leith, Lothian. She was on a voyage from Leith to the Davis Straits.

=== Unknown date ===
List of shipwrecks: Unknown date in February 1812
Ship	State	Description
Alice	United Kingdom	The ship was wrecked on the Barbary Coast. She was on a voyage from Sicily to London.
Allaluia e Santa Maria Trocato	Portugal	The ship was lost near Pwllheli, Caernarvonshire, United Kingdom. She was on a voyage from Liverpool to Porto.
Bon Fim	United Kingdom	The ship foundered while on a voyage from Dublin to Lisbon, Portugal.
Eindragtigheden	Sweden	The ship was lost off Skagen, Denmark. Her crew were rescued.
Eliza	United Kingdom	The ship was wrecked on the Arklow Sandbank, in the Irish Sea. She was on a voyage from Liverpool to Dublin.
Intrepide	France	Napoleonic Wars: The privateer was set afire by her crew to avoid capture by HMS Richmond (Royal Navy). She exploded and sank in the Mediterranean Sea off Cape Cept.
HMS Laurel	Royal Navy	The frigate was lost in Quiberon Bay. Her crew survived but some of them were taken prisoner by the French.
Lord Vernon	United Kingdom	The ship was driven ashore and severely damaged in Whitesand Bay. She was on a voyage from Dartmouth, Devon to a Welsh port. Lord Vernon was later refloated.
Magdalena	Denmark-Norway	The ship was driven ashore and wrecked at Great Yarmouth, Norfolk, United Kingdom. She was on a voyage from Stettin, Prussia to London, United Kingdom.
Mary	United Kingdom	The ship foundered in the North Sea off Great Yarmouth in late February. Her crew survived. She was on her maiden voyage.
Nancy	United Kingdom	Napoleonic Wars: The ship was captured and destroyed by Andromaque, Ariane and Mameluke (all French Navy) before 21 February. She was on a voyage from Brazil to Guernsey, Channel Islands.
Ocean	United Kingdom	The ship was wrecked on Anegada, Virgin Islands towards the end of February. Her crew were rescued. She was on a voyage from British Honduras to London.
Orienten	Flag unknown	The ship was driven ashore in the Gulf of Bothnia.
Osprey	United States	The ship was driven ashore at New London, Maryland. She was on a voyage from Pernambuco, Brazil to New York.
Sarah and Mary	United Kingdom	The ship was wrecked on the Barbary Coast. She was on a voyage from Sicily to London.
Severn	United Kingdom	The ship was driven ashore on "Maravina". She was on a voyage from Bristol, Gloucestershire to Surinam.
Swallow	United Kingdom	The ship foundered off the coast of Ireland. She was on a voyage from Bristol to Belfast.
Thomas and John	United Kingdom	The ship was wrecked on the French coast. Her crew were rescued. She was on a voyage from Waterford to Plymouth, Devon.
Venus	United Kingdom	The ship foundered in the Atlantic Ocean off São Miguel, Azores. She was on a voyage from Liverpool to São Miguel.
Young Factor	United Kingdom	The ship was wrecked at Wilmington, Delaware, United States. She was on a voyage from Wilmington to London.

== March ==
=== 2 March ===
List of shipwrecks: 2 March 1812
Ship	State	Description
Friends	United Kingdom	The ship was run ashore in Whitesand Bay and was abandoned by her crew. She was on a voyage from Plymouth, Devon to Bristol, Gloucestershire. She was refloated with the assistance of a fishing boat and taken in to Plymouth.

=== 4 March ===
List of shipwrecks: 4 March 1812
Ship	State	Description
Fly	United Kingdom	The packet ship was lost near Liverpool with the loss of 78 lives. She was on a voyage from Newry to Liverpool.

=== 5 March ===
List of shipwrecks: 5 March 1812
Ship	State	Description
Beginning	United Kingdom	The sloop was wrecked off Cardigan Island, Cardiganshire with the loss of all hands. She was on a voyage from Dundalk, County Louth to Plymouth, Devon.
Betsey	United Kingdom	The ship was in collision with a brig in the River Suir and was consequently beached. She was on a voyage from Bristol, Gloucestershire to Waterford.
Fly	United Kingdom	The ship foundered in Liverpool Bay with the loss of 78 lives. She was on a voyage from Newry to Liverpool.
Providence	United Kingdom	The ship foundered in the English Channel off St Alban's Head, Dorset. Her crew were rescued.
Rose	United Kingdom	The ship was lost in Loch Indaal. She was on a voyage from Liverpool to Westport, County Mayo.

=== 6 March ===
List of shipwrecks: 6 March 1812
Ship	State	Description
Maryann	United Kingdom	The ship was wrecked on the Cross Sand, in the North Sea off Great Yarmouth, Norfolk. Her crew were rescued. She was on a voyage from Newcastle upon Tyne, Northumberland to London.
Pursuit	United Kingdom	The ship was wrecked on the Corton Sand, in the North Sea off Corton, Suffolk Her crew were rescued. She was on a voyage from Newcastle upon Tyne to London.
Swallow	United Kingdom	The ship was driven ashore and damaged at Ramsgate, Kent. She was on a voyage from Portland, Dorset to London. Swallow was later refloated and taken in to Ramsgate.

=== 7 March ===
List of shipwrecks: 7 March 1812
Ship	State	Description
Mary	United Kingdom	The ship was sighted in the Atlantic Ocean 29°46′N 67°00′W. No further trace, presumed foundered with the loss of all hands. Mary was on a voyage from Tobago to London.
Medway	United Kingdom	The ship foundered in the Atlantic Ocean. Her crew survived. She was on a voyage from Saint Domingo to London.
Two Patricks	United Kingdom	The ship was driven ashore and wrecked at Bideford, Devon. She was on a voyage from Ross, Northumberland to Bristol, Gloucestershire.

=== 8 March ===
List of shipwrecks: 8 March 1812
Ship	State	Description
Endeavour	United Kingdom	The ship foundered in the English Channel off Falmouth, Cornwall. Her crew were rescued. She was on a voyage from Plymouth, Devon to Penzance, Cornwall.

=== 10 March ===
List of shipwrecks: 10 March 1812
Ship	State	Description
Garthland	United Kingdom	The ship ran aground off Ryde, Isle of Wight. She was on a voyage from London to Jamaica. She was refloated.

=== 11 March ===
List of shipwrecks: 11 March 1812
Ship	State	Description
Betsey	United Kingdom	The ship was driven ashore in the Tagus. She was on a voyage from London to Lisbon, Portugal.

=== 13 March ===
List of shipwrecks: 13 March 1812
Ship	State	Description
Fanny	United Kingdom	The ship was driven ashore and damaged at Portreath, Cornwall. She was on a voyage from Portreath to Bristol, Gloucestershire.
Mary	United Kingdom	The ship foundered off St Ives, Cornwall. Her crew were rescued.
Mary	United Kingdom	The ship was driven ashore and severely damaged at Hayle, Cornwall.
Stag	United Kingdom	The brig was wrecked off the South Rock Lighthouse, Ireland. Her crew were rescued. She was on a voyage from Greenock, Renfrewshire to Newfoundland, British North America.
Two Sisters	United Kingdom	The ship foundered while on a voyage from Padstow, Cornwall to Bristol, Gloucestershire. Her crew were rescued.

=== 14 March ===
List of shipwrecks: 14 March 1812
Ship	State	Description
Clarissa	United Kingdom	The ship was wrecked on the Haisborough Sands, in the North Sea off the coast of Norfolk. Her crew were rescued. She was on a voyage from Newcastle upon Tyne, Northumberland to London.
Gibraltar	United Kingdom	The ship was lost off Cap Spartel, Morocco. She was on a voyage from London to Gibraltar.

=== 15 March ===
List of shipwrecks: 15 March 1812
Ship	State	Description
Two Marys	United Kingdom	The ship foundered in the Atlantic Ocean off St. Ives, Cornwall with the loss of all hands. She was on a voyage from Bristol, Gloucestershire to Plymouth, Devon.

=== 16 March ===
List of shipwrecks: 16 March 1812
Ship	State	Description
Duncan	United Kingdom	The ship was driven ashore near Wicklow. She was on a voyage from Chester, Cheshire to Dublin.
Hope	United Kingdom	The ship was driven ashore near Penzance, Cornwall. she was on a voyage from Liverpool to Plymouth, Devon. She was later refloated.
Jane	United Kingdom	The ship was driven ashore in the River Foyle.

=== 18 March ===
List of shipwrecks: 18 March 1812
Ship	State	Description
Bacchus	United Kingdom	Napoleonic Wars: The ship was captured and sunk by the privateer Juno (France). She was on a voyage from Limerick to Greenock, Renfrewshire.

=== 19 March ===
List of shipwrecks: 19 March 1812
Ship	State	Description
Betsey	United Kingdom	The ship foundered off Porthlethen, Cornwall. She was on a voyage from Penzance, Cornwall to Plymouth, Devon.
Peter and Hannah	United Kingdom	The sloop was driven ashore and wrecked at Fowey, Cornwall. She was on a voyage from Plymouth to Falmouth, Cornwall.

=== 20 March ===
List of shipwrecks: 20 March 1812
Ship	State	Description
Ant	United Kingdom	The ship foundered in Dublin Bay.
Blackbird	United Kingdom	The ship was wrecked on the Herd Sand, in the North Sea off North Shields, Northumberland. Her crew were rescued by the Shields Lifeboat.
Cumberland	United Kingdom	The ship was wrecked at Newbiggin-by-the-Sea, Northumberland with the loss of all hands.
Eclipse	United Kingdom	The ship was driven ashore at Margate, Kent. She was on a voyage from Portland, Dorset to London. Eclipse was later refloated and taken in to Whitstable, Kent.
Eleanor	United Kingdom	The ship was driven ashore and wrecked at Whitby, Yorkshire. Her crew were rescued.
Eleanor	United Kingdom	The ship was driven ashore at Cullercoats, Northumberland.
Elizabeth and Sarah	United Kingdom	The ship was driven ashore and wrecked at Bridlington, Yorkshire. Her crew were rescued.
Endeavour	United Kingdom	The ship was wrecked near Meggy's Bourn, Northumberland. Her crew were rescued.
Fame	United Kingdom	The sloop was wrecked on the Colleywell Sands, in the North Sea off the coast of County Durham. Her crew were rescued.
Fly	United Kingdom	The ship was driven ashore at St. Ives, Cornwall. She was on a voyage from Dublin to Plymouth, Devon and Portsmouth, Hampshire.
George	United Kingdom	The ship was driven ashore at Plymouth.
George	United Kingdom	The brig sprang a leak and foundered in the North Sea off Flamborough Head, Yorkshire. Her crew were rescued by the brig Hero (United Kingdom). George was on a voyage from Ramsgate, Kent to Sunderland, County Durham.
Henry	United Kingdom	The ship foundered in Dublin Bay. She was on a voyage from Liverpool to Dublin.
Holdsworth Trader	United Kingdom	The ship was wrecked at St Andrews, Fife. Her crew were rescued.
John and Mary	United Kingdom	The ship was driven ashore and wrecked at Warkworth, Northumberland. Her crew were rescued.
Lively	United Kingdom	The ship was driven ashore and wrecked at Howick, Northumberland with the loss of a crew member.
Margaret and Ann	United Kingdom	The ship ran aground on the Sow and Pigs Rocks, in the North Sea off the coast of County Durham. Her crew were rescued. She was later refloated and taken in to Blyth, Northumberland for repairs.
Mary	United Kingdom	The ship was wrecked near Bude, Cornwall. She was on a voyage from Travennance, Cornwall to Llanelli, Glamorgan.
Salome	United Kingdom	The ship was driven ashore in Bigbury Bay. Her crew were rescued.
Salus	United Kingdom	The ship was driven ashore and wrecked at Ryhope, County Durham. Her crew were rescued.
Speedwell	United Kingdom	The ship was driven ashore and wrecked on Hartley Bates's Isle, County Durham. Her crew were rescued.
St. Erie	Sweden	The ship was driven ashore and wrecked at Whitburn, County Durham. Her crew were rescued.
Themis	United Kingdom	The ship was driven ashore and wrecked at Cresswell, Northumberland. Her crew were rescued.
Wellwood	United Kingdom	The ship was wrecked near Wexford. All on board were rescued. She was on a voyage from Liverpool to Brazil.
William and Mary	United Kingdom	The ship was driven ashore at Great Yarmouth, Norfolk. Her crew were rescued.

=== 21 March ===
List of shipwrecks: 21 March 1812
Ship	State	Description
Agriculture	United Kingdom	The ship was driven ashore at Whitby, Yorkshire. She was on a voyage from London to Whitby. Agriculture was later refloated and taken in to Whitby for repairs.
Ann & Maria	United Kingdom	The ship was driven ashore in Aberdaron Bay. She was on a voyage from Aberystwyth, Cardiganshire to the Isle of Man.
Betsey	United Kingdom	The ship was driven ashore in Mount's Bay. Her crew were rescued. She was on a voyage from Liverpool to Plymouth, Devon.
Bonito	United Kingdom	The ship was driven ashore on the coast of Anglesey. Her crew were rescued. She was on a voyage from Liverpool to Dublin.
Citizen	(United Kingdom of Great Britain and Ireland) Virgin Islands	Napoleonic Wars: The ship was captured off "Cape Roxo" by the privateer Marengo (France) while on a voyage from Saint Croix to Curaçao. She was set afire and sunk.
Comet	United Kingdom	The ship was driven ashore at Red Wharf Bay, Anglesey. She was on a voyage from Liverpool to Whitehaven, Cumberland.
Friends	United Kingdom	The ship was driven ashore in Mounts Bay. She was on a voyage from Fowey, Cornwall to Swansea, Glamorgan.
Friendship	United Kingdom	The ship was wrecked at Plymouth, Devon. Her crew were rescued.
Gage	United Kingdom	The ship was driven ashore and wrecked in Mount's Bay.
Happy Return	United Kingdom	The ship was driven ashore in Aberdaron Bay. She was on a voyage from Aberystwyth to Pwllheli, Caernarfonshire.
Harmony	United Kingdom	The ship was driven ashore at Burnt Island, Fife. She was on a voyage from London to Leith, Lothian. Her crew were rescued. Harmony was refloated on 23 March and taken in to North Shields, Northumberland for repairs.
Hibernia	United Kingdom	The ship was driven ashore near Belfast, County Antrim. She was on a voyage from Belfast to Jamaica. Hibernia was later refloated and taken in to Belfast.
Invariable	United Kingdom	The ship was driven ashore in Mounts Bay. Her crew were rescued.
Langston	United Kingdom	The ship sank in the River Liffey, Dublin.
Nancy	United Kingdom	The ship was driven ashore in Mounts Bay. She was on a voyage from Bideford, Devon to Plymouth. She was later refloated.
Nettle	United Kingdom	The ship was driven ashore in Mounts Bay. She was on a voyage from Falmouth, Cornwall to Fowey.
Nimble	United Kingdom	The ship was driven ashore in Mounts Bay. She was on a voyage from Cardiff, Glamorgan to London. She was later refloated.
Salome	United Kingdom	The ship was driven ashore in Bigbury Bay. Her crew were rescued.
United Friends	United Kingdom	The ship was driven ashore in Mounts Bay. She was on a voyage from Swansea to Fowey. She was later refloated.
William Dumaresq and Charles	United Kingdom	The ship was driven ashore in Mounts Bay. She was on a voyage from Jersey, Channel Islands to Swanage, Dorset.

=== 22 March ===
List of shipwrecks: 22 March 1812
Ship	State	Description
Ann	United Kingdom	The brig was driven ashore at Liverpool. She was on a voyage from Liverpool to Newfoundland, British North America.
Jane	United Kingdom	The ship was wrecked at Ardglass, County Down with the loss of all but two of her crew. She was on a voyage from Liverpool to Belfast.

=== 23 March ===
List of shipwrecks: 23 March 1812
Ship	State	Description
Exchange	United Kingdom	The ship was driven ashore at Whitby, Yorkshire. Her crew were rescued. She was later refloated and put into Whitby for repairs.
William	United Kingdom	The ship was wrecked at Dublin. She was on a voyage from Chepstow, Monmouthshire to Dublin.

=== 24 March ===
List of shipwrecks: 24 March 1812
Ship	State	Description
Hope	United Kingdom	The brig foundered in the Atlantic Ocean off the Saltee Islands, County Donegal with the loss of one of her nine crew. She was on a voyage from Plymouth, Devon to Caernarfon.

=== 25 March ===
List of shipwrecks: 25 March 1812
Ship	State	Description
Hope	United Kingdom	The ship was wrecked on the Irish coast. She was on a voyage from Plymouth, Devon to Caernarfon.

=== 26 March ===
List of shipwrecks: 26 March 1812
Ship	State	Description
Industry	United Kingdom	The ship departed from Liverpool for St. John's, Newfoundland, British North America. No further trace, presumed foundered with the loss of all hands.

=== 27 March ===
List of shipwrecks: 27 March 1812
Ship	State	Description
Aurora	United Kingdom	The ship struck the pier at Dublin and became severely leaky. She was on a voyage from Liverpool, Lancashire to Porto, Portugal.
Blandinah	United Kingdom	The brig was wrecked on the Shipwash Sand, in the North Sea. Her crew were rescued.
Effort	United Kingdom	The whaler ran aground on the Shipwash Sand and sank. Her crew survived She was on a voyage from London to Greenland. Effort was later refloated.
Reliance	United Kingdom	The ship ran aground on the Shipwash Sand and was abandoned by her crew. She was later refloated and taken in to Aldeburgh, Suffolk.
Three unnamed vessels	France	Napoleonic Wars: Two praams were driven ashore on the coast of Seine-Inférieure in an engagement with HMS Griffon and HMS Rosario (both Royal Navy) A third praam was sunk.

=== 28 March ===
List of shipwrecks: 28 March 1812
Ship	State	Description
Harmony	United Kingdom	The ship was wrecked near Kinghorn, Fife. Her crew were rescued. She was on a voyage from Leith, Lothian to London.
Nanny	United Kingdom	The ship was driven ashore and wrecked at Dunbar, Lothian. Her crew were rescued. She was on a voyage from Newburgh, Fife to London.

=== 29 March ===
List of shipwrecks: 29 March 1812
Ship	State	Description
Margaret	United Kingdom	The ship was lost in Ross Bay. Her crew were rescued. She was on a voyage from Newport to Limerick.
Pensacola	New Spain	The ship struck rocks on the west coast of Bermuda and was wrecked. She was on a voyage from Pensacola, East Florida to London, United Kingdom.
Thomas and Nancy	United Kingdom	The ship was wrecked at Seaton Delaval, Northumberland. Her crew were rescued.

=== 30 March ===
List of shipwrecks: 30 March 1812
Ship	State	Description
St. David	United Kingdom	The ship was wrecked at Carmarthen.
Foma (Фома, 'Thomas')	Imperial Russian Navy	The brigantine was driven ashore next to the Sasyk salt lake and wrecked. Her crew were rescued. She was on a voyage from Sevastopol to Yevpatoria.
Unnamed	Flag unknown	The ship was wrecked in Whitsand Bay with the loss of two of her crew.

=== 31 March ===
List of shipwrecks: 31 March 1812
Ship	State	Description
Susannah	United Kingdom	The ship was lost in Whitsand Bay near Rame Head, Cornwall with the loss of two of her crew. She was on a voyage from Lisbon, Portugal to London.
St. Patrick	United Kingdom	The ship was driven ashore near Killough, County Down. she was on a voyage from London to Belfast. 'St. Patrick was refloated on 16 April and resumed her voyage.

=== Unknown date ===
List of shipwrecks: Unknown date in March 1812
Ship	State	Description
Beginning	United Kingdom	The ship foundered in the Irish Sea off Cardigan with the loss of all hands. She was on a voyage from Dundalk, County Louth to Plymouth, Devon.
Camel	United Kingdom	Napoleonic Wars: The ship was captured by the French Navy between 9 and 29 March while on a voyage from Cork to Barbados. She was set afire and sunk.
Coaster	United Kingdom	The ship was driven ashore at Warkworth, Northumberland.
Cruden	United Kingdom	The ship was wrecked on Cobler's Rock, Barbados before 7 March. She was on a voyage from Newfoundland, British North America to Grenada.
George and William	United Kingdom	Napoleonic Wars: The ship was captured by the French Navy between 9 and 29 March while on a voyage from São Miguel, Azores to London. She was set afire and sunk.
Goodintent	United Kingdom	The ship was driven ashore and wrecked at Teignmouth, Devon.
Havkormen	(Denmark) Norway	The ship was lost at Ballyshannon, County Donegal.
Hector	United Kingdom	The ship was wrecked near Arklow, County Wicklow. Her crew were rescued. She was on a voyage from Guernsey, Channel Islands to Dublin.
Henry	United Kingdom	The ship was driven ashore between Gravesend, Kent and The Downs. She was on a voyage from Gravesend to the Île de France. She was refloated and taken in to Portsmouth, Hampshire for repairs.
Hillsborough	United Kingdom	The ship was lost near Alderney, Channel Islands. She was on a voyage from Porto, Portugal to London.
Indiana	United Kingdom	The ship was driven ashore at Warkworth.
Jenny	United Kingdom	The ship was driven ashore at Red Wharf Bay, Anglesey with the loss of most of her crew.
Joan	United States	Napoleonic Wars: The ship was captured and destroyed by Andromaque, Ariane and Mameluke (all French Navy) before 25 March. She was on a voyage from Puerto Rico to Portsmouth, New Hampshire.
John	United Kingdom	Napoleonic Wars: The ship was captured by the French Navy between 9 and 29 March while on a voyage from Surinam to London. She was set afire and sunk.
Lord Wellington	United Kingdom	The schooner foundered. She was on a voyage from London to Lisbon, Portugal.
Maria	United Kingdom	The ship was driven ashore in Bigbury Bay with the loss of two of her crew. She was on a voyage from Portsmouth, Hampshire to Guernsey, Channel Islands.
Morning Star	United Kingdom	The ship was wrecked on The Skerries with the loss of three lives. She was on a voyage from Liverpool to Dundalk, County Louth.
Nancy	United Kingdom	The ship was driven ashore in Dunbar Bay. She was on a voyage from the River Tay to London.
Neptune	United Kingdom	Napoleonic Wars: The ship was captured by the French Navy between 9 and 29 March while on a voyage from Aberdeen to Saint Croix, Virgin Islands. She was set afire and sunk.
Ocean	United Kingdom	Napoleonic Wars: The ship was captured by the French Navy between 9 and 29 March while on a voyage from Surinam to London. She was set afire and sunk.
Polly	United States	Napoleonic Wars: The ship was captured and destroyed by Andromaque, Ariane and Mameluke (all French Navy) before 25 March. She was on a voyage from Newberryport, Massachusetts to Saint Barthélemy.
Recovery	United Kingdom	The ship was lost near Land's End, Cornwall.
Rosina	(Denmark) Norway	The ship was wrecked on the Dutch coast.
Russell	United Kingdom	The ship was lost near South Shields, County Durham. She was on a voyage from London to South Shields, or Selby, Yorkshire.
St. Eric	United Kingdom	The ship was driven ashore and wrecked at Whitburn, County Durham. Her crew were rescued. She was on a voyage from Hull, Yorkshire to Liverpool.
Swansea	United Kingdom	The ship was driven ashore at Baldoyle, County Dublin. She was on a voyage from Chepstow, Monmouthshire to Dublin.
Thetis	United Kingdom	The ship was driven ashore and wrecked at Whitburn. Her crew were rescued. She was on a voyage from London to Carron, Stirlingshire.
Thomas	United States	The schooner was captured by HMS Medusa and HMS Niemen (both Royal Navy) while on a voyage from Salem, Massachusetts to Bordeaux, Gironde, France. She was ordered in to Plymouth, Devon but foundered. Her crew were rescued.
William and Ann	United Kingdom	The ship was driven ashore at Warkworth.
Two unnamed vessels	United Kingdom	Napoleonic Wars: The ships were captured and burnt by the privateer Juno (France).

== April ==
=== 3 April ===
List of shipwrecks: 3 April 1812
Ship	State	Description
Charming Sally	United States	The ship foundered while on a voyage from New Providence, New Jersey to Saint Vincent.
Lady Charlotte	United Kingdom	The ship was wrecked on Bardsey Island, Pembrokeshire. Her crew were rescued. She was on a voyage from Gijón, Spain to Bristol, Gloucestershire.

=== 6 April ===
List of shipwrecks: 6 April 1812
Ship	State	Description
City of Edinburgh	United Kingdom	The ship foundered in the Atlantic Ocean 46 leagues (138 nautical miles (256 km)) off the Azores with the loss of seven of her 51 crew. Survivors were rescued by Fame (United Kingdom). City of Edinburgh was on a voyage from Lima, Viceroyalty of Peru to Cádiz, Spain.
Star	United Kingdom	The ship was run down and sunk by Victory (United Kingdom) with the loss of a crew member. She was on a voyage from Waterford to Milford Haven, Pembrokeshire.

=== 9 April ===
List of shipwrecks: 9 April 1812
Ship	State	Description
Felicidade de Madeira	Portugal	The ship foundered off Madeira.
Mars	United Kingdom	The ship was wrecked at Guernsey, Channel Islands. She was on a voyage from Guernsey to Plymouth, Devon.

=== 10 April ===
List of shipwrecks: 10 April 1812
Ship	State	Description
William and Ann	United States	The ship sprang a leak in the Atlantic Ocean (approximately 39°N 50°W) and was abandoned by her crew, who were rescued by Mandarin (United States). William and Ann was on a voyage from Baltimore, Maryland to Cádiz, Spain.

=== 11 April ===
List of shipwrecks: 11 April 1812
Ship	State	Description
Elizabeth	United Kingdom	The ship foundered in the Mediterranean Sea off Cape de Gatt, Spain. Her crew were rescued. She was on a voyage from Malta to London.

=== 13 April ===
List of shipwrecks: 13 April 1812
Ship	State	Description
Hope	United Kingdom	The ship was driven ashore and damaged in the River Suir She was on a voyage from Waterford to Teignmouth, Devon.

=== 14 April ===
List of shipwrecks: 14 April 1812
Ship	State	Description
Dispatch Packet	United Kingdom	The ship was wrecked on the west end of Sicily while coming from Malta for England. All on board and the mails were rescued.

=== 15 April ===
List of shipwrecks: 15 April 1812
Ship	State	Description
Brisk	United Kingdom	Napoleonic Wars: The ship was captured in the Mediterranean Sea off Sicily by Pauline (French Navy) and a French brig. She was set afire and sunk. Brisk was on a voyage from London to Salonica, Greece.
Hawker	United Kingdom	The ship ran aground at Wexford. She was on a voyage from Liverpool to Jamaica. Hawker was later refloated and resumed her voyage.
Vine	United Kingdom	The ship struck a rock at Donaghadee, County Down and was severely damaged. She was on a voyage from Belfast to London. Vine put into Donaghadee.

=== 16 April ===
List of shipwrecks: 16 April 1812
Ship	State	Description
Enterprize	United States	The ship was wrecked on Abaco. Her crew were rescued. She was on a voyage from Rhode Island to Havana, Cuba.

=== 17 April ===
List of shipwrecks: 17 April 1812
Ship	State	Description
Ocean	United Kingdom	The ship was wrecked at Redcar, Yorkshire. She was on a voyage from Aberdeen to London.

=== 20 April ===
List of shipwrecks: 20 April 1812
Ship	State	Description
Gipsey	United States	The ship foundered in the Gulf of Mexico. Her crew were rescued. She was on a voyage from Havana, Cuba to Boston, Massachusetts.

=== 24 April ===
List of shipwrecks: 24 April 1812
Ship	State	Description
I. O. Small	United Kingdom	The ship sprang a leak and foundered while on a voyage from St. Ubes, Spain to Limerick. Her crew were rescued.

=== 26 April ===
List of shipwrecks: 26 April 1812
Ship	State	Description
Duke of Kent	United Kingdom	The ship was sunk by ice off the Magdalen Islands, Lower Canada, British North America. She was on a voyage from Glasgow, Renfrewshire to Miramichi, New Brunswick, British North America.
Mariner	United Kingdom	The ship was wrecked at Dornoch, Sutherland with the loss of all hands.

=== 28 April ===
List of shipwrecks: 28 April 1812
Ship	State	Description
King of Prussia	United Kingdom	The ship was driven ashore in Dundalk Bay. She was on a voyage from Liverpool to Newry, Ireland.
Maria	United Kingdom	The ship was wrecked on the coast of Africa.

=== 29 April ===
List of shipwrecks: 29 April 1812
Ship	State	Description
Ontario	United Kingdom	The ship ran aground at Amelia Island, East Florida, New Spain and was severely damaged. She was on a voyage from Liverpool to Amelia Island.

=== 30 April ===
List of shipwrecks: 30 April 1812
Ship	State	Description
Iris	United Kingdom	The ship was driven ashore in the Orinoco River. She was on a voyage from London to Berbice.
Success	United Kingdom	The ship struck a rock off Land's End, Cornwall and foundered. Her crew were rescued. She was on a voyage from Neath, Glamorgan to Dartmouth, Devon.

=== Unknown date ===
List of shipwrecks: Unknown date in April 1812
Ship	State	Description
Adventure	United Kingdom	The ship foundered in the Atlantic Ocean off Cape Lopez, Africa with the loss of her captain.
Charlotte	United Kingdom	The full-rigged ship was captured and destroyed by Andromaque, Ariane and Mameluke (all French Navy) before 27 April.
Commerce	United Kingdom	The ship was lost off Cape Jaci. She was on a voyage from Malta to Sicily.
Conceição	Portugal	Napoleonic Wars: The brig was captured by a French Navy squadron and was scuttled.
Lee	United Kingdom	The ship was driven ashore near Antrim. She was on a voyage from Workington, Cumberland to a port in North America.
Louisa	United Kingdom	Napoleonic Wars: The ship was captured by a French privateer. She was subsequently lost off the Île de Batz, Finistère, France. Louisa was on a voyage from Cork to Guernsey, Channel Islands.
Thomas and Mary	United Kingdom	The ship was driven ashore on the Holderness coast, Yorkshire. She was later refloated and taken in to Bridlington, Yorkshire.
Unity	United Kingdom	The ship was lost at Mallorca, Spain.

== May ==
=== 1 May ===
List of shipwrecks: 1 May 1812
Ship	State	Description
Eliza	United Kingdom	Napoleonic Wars: The ship was captured by the privateer L'Aigl (France). She was subsequently driven ashore on the French coast by HMS Arrow (Royal Navy) and was destroyed. Eliza was on a voyage from Saint Thomas, Virgin Islands to London.

=== 2 May ===
List of shipwrecks: 2 May 1812
Ship	State	Description
HMS Apelles	United Kingdom	The Crocus-class brig-sloop was driven ashore at Étaples, Pas-de-Calais, France. She was captured by the French the next day and was refloated.
Enterprize	United Kingdom	The ship struck the Runnel Stone and was consequently beached at Penwith, Cornwall. Her crew were rescued. She was on a voyage from Newport, Monmouthshire to London.
HMS Skylark	Royal Navy	The sloop-of-war ran aground at Étaples. She was blown up and destroyed by her crew.

=== 3 May ===
List of shipwrecks: 3 May 1812
Ship	State	Description
Mariner	United Kingdom	The brig was wrecked at Dornoch, Sutherland with the loss of all sixteen crew.

=== 4 May ===
List of shipwrecks: 4 May 1812
Ship	State	Description
Apelles	France	The Crocus-class brig-sloop was driven ashore on the coast of Pas-de-Calais by HMS Bermuda and HMS Rinaldo (both Royal Navy). She was subsequently recaptured by HMS Bermuda.

=== 7 May ===
List of shipwrecks: 7 May 1812
Ship	State	Description
Alictum	United Kingdom	The ship was lost in the River Tay. She was on a voyage from Dundee, Forfarshire to an Irish port.

=== 8 May ===
List of shipwrecks: 8 May 1812
Ship	State	Description
Nimrod	United Kingdom	The ship was driven ashore at Kingroad, Avonmouth, Gloucestershire and was wrecked. She was on a voyage from Bristol, Gloucestershire to Malta.

=== 10 May ===
List of shipwrecks: 10 May 1812
Ship	State	Description
Albion	United Kingdom	The brig was driven ashore and wrecked at Atherfield, Isle of Wight. She was on a voyage from Plymouth, Devon to London.
Diamond	United Kingdom	The ship was wrecked on the Goodwin Sands, Kent. Her crew were rescued. She was on a voyage from Zakynthos, Greece to Hull, Yorkshire.
Eliza	United Kingdom	The ship was driven ashore and wrecked in Bigbury Bay. Her crew were rescued. She was on a voyage from St. Andrews, Fife to London.
Flor	Sweden	The brig was driven ashore and wrecked at Abbotsbury, Dorset, United Kingdom. She was on a voyage from Pernambuco, Brazil to London, United Kingdom.
Irlam	United Kingdom	The ship was wrecked on the Tuskar Rock. All on board were rescued by the snow Sarah and another vessel (both United Kingdom).

=== 11 May ===
List of shipwrecks: 11 May 1812
Ship	State	Description
Hector	United Kingdom	The ship was driven ashore on Anglesey. Her crew were rescued.
Selina	United Kingdom	The transport ship was driven ashore and wrecked at Penlee Point, Rame, Cornwall with the loss of all on board.

=== 13 May ===
List of shipwrecks: 13 May 1812
Ship	State	Description
Hector	United Kingdom	The ship ran aground on Anglesey and was wrecked. Her crew were rescued.

=== 15 May ===
List of shipwrecks: 15 May 1812
Ship	State	Description
Prince Regent	United Kingdom	The ship struck a rock and was beached at Margate, Kent. She was later refloated.

=== 17 May ===
List of shipwrecks: 17 May 1812
Ship	State	Description
Frederick William	United States	The ship was wrecked on Calf Island, Massachusetts with the loss of four of her crew. She was on a voyage from Lisbon, Portugal to Boston, Massachusetts, and Havana, Cuba.

=== 18 May ===
List of shipwrecks: 18 May 1812
Ship	State	Description
John Watson	United Kingdom	The ship was wrecked near New York, United States. Her crew were rescued. She was on a voyage from Londonderry to New York.

=== 22 May ===
List of shipwrecks: 22 May 1812
Ship	State	Description
Andromaque	French Navy	Ariane (second left), Andromaque (second right) and HMS Northumberland (right). Napoleonic Wars, Action of 22 May 1812: The Ariane-class frigate ran aground off L'Orient, Morbihan in an engagement with HMS Growler and HMS Northumberland (both Royal Navy). She was set afire and scuttled by her crew.
Ariane	French Navy	Napoleonic Wars, Action of 22 May 1812: The Ariane-class frigate ran aground off L'Orient in an engagement with HMS Growler and HMS Northumberland (both Royal Navy). She was set afire and scuttled by her crew.
Mameluke	French Navy	Napoleonic Wars, Action of 22 May 1812: The brig was lost in an engagement with HMS Growler and HMS Northumbeland (both Royal Navy).

=== 25 May ===
List of shipwrecks: 25 May 1812
Ship	State	Description
Dover Castle	British East India Company	The East Indiaman ran aground at Saugor, India and was severely damaged. She was later refloated and taken in to Calcutta for repairs.

=== 27 May ===
List of shipwrecks: 27 May 1812
Ship	State	Description
Hercules	United States	The ship was wrecked on North Ronaldsay, Orkney Islands, United Kingdom. She was on a voyage from Gothenburg, Sweden to Hull, Yorkshire and the United States.

=== Unknown date ===
List of shipwrecks: Unknown date in May 1812
Ship	State	Description
Conception	Portugal	Napoleonic Wars: The brig was captured by a French squadron and was destroyed.
Eliza	United Kingdom	Napoleonic Wars: The ship was captured by the privateer L'Aigle (France). She was driven ashore and wrecked on the French coast after 1 May.
General Small	United Kingdom	The ship foundered in the Atlantic Ocean off São Miguel, Azores.
Janet	United Kingdom	The ship was werecked on the coast of the Isle of Man. Her crew were rescued. She was on a voyage from County Clare to Greenock, Renfrewshire.
Queen Charlotte	United Kingdom	The ship was driven ashore and wrecked at Cape Frio, Brazil.
Sportsman	United Kingdom	The ship was driven ashore at Atherstone, Isle of Wight and was wrecked. She was on a voyage from Lisbon, Portugal to London.
Superior	United States	The ship was wrecked in the Azores, Portugal.

== June ==
=== 4 June ===
List of shipwrecks: 4 June 1812
Ship	State	Description
Discovery	United Kingdom	The coaster, a brig, was driven ashore in Table Bay.
Lion	United Kingdom	The ship was wrecked on Grand Cayman. Her crew were rescued. She was on a voyage from British Honduras to London.
Restaurador	Portugal	The full-rigged ship was driven ashore in Table Bay.
Thomas and Sally	United Kingdom	The ship was driven ashore and wrecked at Hornsea, Yorkshire.

=== 6 June ===
List of shipwrecks: 6 June 1812
Ship	State	Description
St. Thomas	United States	The ship was abandoned in the Atlantic Ocean. She was on a voyage from New York to Tenerife, Canary Islands.

=== 9 June ===
List of shipwrecks: 9 June 1812
Ship	State	Description
Thomas and Sally	United Kingdom	The ship was wrecked near Hornsea, Yorkshire.

=== 10 June ===
List of shipwrecks: 10 June 1812
Ship	State	Description
Campbell Macquarie	United Kingdom	The full-rigged ship struck rocks off Macquarie Island and was wrecked with the loss of four of her 42 crew. She was set afire on 28 June for her ironwork. Survivors were rescued on 11 October by Perseverance ( (United Kingdom of Great Britain and Ireland) New South Wales.

=== 17 June ===
List of shipwrecks: 17 June 1812
Ship	State	Description
Ann	United Kingdom	The ship was driven ashore and wrecked at Deal, Kent.

=== 18 June ===
List of shipwrecks: 18 June 1812
Ship	State	Description
Incomparable	France	Napoleonic Wars: The privateer, a lugger was captured in an engagement with HMRC Hind ( Board of Customs) but foundered due to damage sustained. Nine of her crew were rescued.

=== 28 June ===
List of shipwrecks: 28 June 1812
Ship	State	Description
Friends	United Kingdom	The ship struck a rock and sank in the River Suir. She was on a voyage from Liverpool to Waterford.
Margaret	United Kingdom	The ship ran aground on the west coast of Saint Croix, Virgin Ilands and was damaged. She was on a voyage from Tobago to London.She was refloated on 2 July and taken in to Saint Thomas, Virgin Islands.
Trafalgar	United Kingdom	The ship ran aground on the west coast of Saint Croix and was damaged. She was refloated on 2 July. Trafalgar was on a voyage from Tobago to Bristol.

=== Unknown date ===
List of shipwrecks: Unknown date in June 1812
Ship	State	Description
Three Brothers	United Kingdom	The ship was lost in the Gulf of Mexico. Her crew survived. She was on a voyage from Jamaica to London.
Woodside	United Kingdom	The ship was lost in Red Bay, County Antrim. She was on a voyage from the River Clyde to Belfast.

== July ==
=== 1 July ===
List of shipwrecks: 1 July 1812
Ship	State	Description
Lady Holland	United Kingdom	The ship was run ashore at Savanna-la-Mar, Jamaica. She was on a voyage from Jamaica to London.

=== 3 July ===
List of shipwrecks: 3 July 1812
Ship	State	Description
Jenny	United Kingdom	The ship was lost on Sooty Island, Nova Scotia, British North America. She was on a voyage from London to Prince Edward Island, British North America.

=== 6 July ===
List of shipwrecks: 6 July 1812
Ship	State	Description
Brutus Blunt	United States	War of 1812: The ship was captured and burnt by HMS Shannon and other vessels (all Royal Navy).
HMS Calypso	Royal Navy	Gunboat War, Battle of Lyngør: The Cruiser-class brig-sloop ran aground off Merdø Island during the battle. She was refloated.
HMS Flamer	Royal Navy	Gunboat War, Battle of Lyngør: The Courser-class gun-brig ran agroud off Merdø Island during the battle. She was refloated.
Mount Hope	United States	War of 1812: The schooner was captured and burnt by HMS Shannon and other vessels (all Royal Navy).
HDMS Najaden	(Denmark) Dano-Norwegian Navy	Gunboat War, Battle of Lyngør: The frigate was sunk off Lyngør by HMS Dictator (Royal Navy) with the loss of 133 of her 336 crew.
HMS Podargus	Royal Navy	Gunboat War, Battle of Lyngør: The Crocus-class brig-sloop ran aground off Merdø Island during the battle. She was refloated.

=== 7 July ===
List of shipwrecks: 7 July 1812
Ship	State	Description
Peace	United Kingdom	The ship was wrecked on the Cobbler's Rock, Barbados. She was on a voyage from Cape Breton Island, British North America to Barbados.

=== 9 July ===
List of shipwrecks: 9 July 1812
Ship	State	Description
Unnamed	Flag unknown	The brig-of-war ran aground off Neuwerk, Hamburg. She was set afire by her crew and exploded.

=== 10 July ===
List of shipwrecks: 10 July 1812
Ship	State	Description
Argus	United States	War of 1812: The schooner was captured and burnt by HMS Shannon and other vessels (all Royal Navy). She was on a voyage from Lisbon, Portugal to New York.
HMS Exertion	Royal Navy	The gun-brig ran aground at the mouth of the Elbe. She was scuttled by HMS Redbreast (Royal Navy).

=== 11 July ===
List of shipwrecks: 11 July 1812
Ship	State	Description
Mechanic	United States	War of 1812: The full-rigged ship was captured and burnt by HMS Shannon and other vessels (all Royal Navy). She was on a voyage from Limerick, United Kingdom to Philadelphia, Pennsylvania.

=== 12 July ===
List of shipwrecks: 12 July 1812
Ship	State	Description
Eliza Gracie	United States	War of 1812: The ship was captured and burnt by HMS Shannon and other vessels (all Royal Navy). She was on a voyage from Lisbon, Portugal to New York.

=== 13 July ===
List of shipwrecks: 13 July 1812
Ship	State	Description
Amaranth	United States	War of 1812: The schooner was captured and burnt by HMS Shannon and other vessels (all Royal Navy). She was on a voyage from Havana, Cuba to Boston, Massachusetts.

=== 15 July ===
List of shipwrecks: 15 July 1812
Ship	State	Description
Citizen	United States	War of 1812: The schooner was captured and burnt by HMS Shannon and other vessels (all Royal Navy). She was on a voyage from Baltimore, Maryland to Boston, Massachusetts.
Highlander	United Kingdom	The ship was wrecked on the Carysfort Reef. She was on a voyage from Jamaica to London.
Milford	United Kingdom	The ship ran aground at Teignmouth, Devon.
Unnamed	United Kingdom	The ship was wrecked on the coast of Jutland.

=== 16 July ===
List of shipwrecks: 16 July 1812
Ship	State	Description
Fame	United States	War of 1812: The schooner was captured and burnt by HMS Shannon and other vessels (all Royal Navy). She was on a voyage from Savannah, Georgia to Boston, Massachusetts.
Juno	United Kingdom	The ship was wrecked on the Carysfort Reef. She was on a voyage from New Orleans, Louisiana, to Boston, Massachusetts, United States.
Sally	(United Kingdom of Great Britain and Ireland) New South Wales	The ship sprang a leak and foundered in the Pacific Ocean 60 nautical miles (110 km) south east of the mouth of the Hunter's River. Her crew survived.

=== 23 July ===
List of shipwrecks: 23 July 1812
Ship	State	Description
Eleanor	United States	War of 1812: The schooner was captured and burnt by HMS Shannon and other vessels (all Royal Navy). She was on a voyage from Saint Croix, Virgin Islands to Boston, Massachusetts.
Three Sisters	United Kingdom	The ship was driven ashore and wrecked at Brighton, Sussex. Her crew were rescued.

=== 26 July ===
List of shipwrecks: 26 July 1812
Ship	State	Description
Venture	United Kingdom	The ship sank at "Armino". She was on a voyage from London to Leeds, Yorkshire.

=== 29 July ===
List of shipwrecks: 29 July 1812
Ship	State	Description
Abercromby (Abercrombie)	United Kingdom	The ship was lost in the Caramata Passage. Her crew were rescued. She was on a voyage from Bombay, India to China.
Polly	United Kingdom	The sloop foundered in the North Sea off Westgate-on-Sea, Kent. Her four crew survived. She was on a voyage from Poole, Dorset to London. Also reported as foundering in the English Channel off Brighton, Sussex.

=== 30 July ===
List of shipwrecks: 30 July 1812
Ship	State	Description
James	United States	The ship was driven ashore at Cape Ann, Massachusetts. She was on a voyage from the Mediterranean to Salem, Massachusetts.

=== 31 July ===
List of shipwrecks: 31 July 1812
Ship	State	Description
Fisher	United Kingdom	The ship departed Rio de Janeiro for the Clyde. No further trace, presumed foundered in the Atlantic Ocean with the loss of all hands.

=== Unknown date ===
List of shipwrecks: Unknown date in July 1812
Ship	State	Description
Alectum	United Kingdom	The ship was driven ashore and wrecked at Dundee, Forfarshire with some loss of life.
Althea	United Kingdom	The vessel was lost on Fultah Point on the Hooghli River in India.
Betsey	(United Kingdom of Great Britain and Ireland) Saint Vincent	The ship was wrecked on Amelia Island, East Florida, New Spain.
Boyd	(United Kingdom of Great Britain and Ireland) New South Wales	The ship was driven ashore and wrecked in late July between the mouth of the Hunter River and Port Stephens with the loss of two of her crew.
Julia	(United Kingdom of Great Britain and Ireland) Jersey	War of the Sixth Coalition: The ship was captured and scuttled off Start Point, Devon by the privateer Turbulent (France) in early July.
Lindisfarne	United Kingdom	The ship was wrecked on Miquelon. Her crew were rescued. She was on a voyage from Miramichi, New Brunswick, British North America to Glasgow, Scotland.
Rambler	United Kingdom	The ship was lost on the Isle of Lewis, Outer Hebrides.
Volunteer	United Kingdom	War of the Sixth Coalition: The ship was captured and burnt on the Grand Banks of Newfoundland by a French privateer.

== August ==
=== 1 August ===
List of shipwrecks: 1 August 1812
Ship	State	Description
Eight Sisters	United States	War of 1812: HMS Ringdove (Royal Navy) captured Eight sisters while she was on a voyage from Dublin to Boston, Massachusetts. She was set afire and sunk.
Royal Bounty	United Kingdom	War of 1812: The ship was captured and burnt by the privateer Yankee (United States). Royal Bounty was on a voyage from Hull, Yorkshire to Prince Edward Island, British North America.
Thetis	United Kingdom	War of 1812: The ship was captured and burnt by the privateer Yankee (United States).

=== 2 August ===
List of shipwrecks: 2 August 1812
Ship	State	Description
HMS Emulous	Royal Navy	The Cruizer-class brig-sloop ran aground and was wrecked 19 nautical miles (35 km) off Cape Sable Island, Nova Scotia, British North America. All on board were rescued by HMS Colibri (Royal Navy).

=== 7 August ===
List of shipwrecks: 7 August 1812
Ship	State	Description
Pomona	United States	War of 1812: The ship was captured and burnt by HMS Aeolus (Royal Navy). She was on a voyage from Liverpool to an American port.

=== 8 August ===
List of shipwrecks: 8 August 1812
Ship	State	Description
Betsey	United Kingdom	The ship was abandoned in the Atlantic Ocean (44°27′N 41°09′W). Sarah (United Kingdom) rescued all on board.

=== 11 August ===
List of shipwrecks: 11 August 1812
Ship	State	Description
Abeona	United Kingdom	War of 1812: The ship was captured by the USS Constitution (United States Navy) while on a voyage from Buctush, British North America to Newcastle upon Tyne, Northumberland.
Jane	United Kingdom	The ship was lost on São Nicolau, Cape Verde Islands. Her crew were rescued.

=== 13 August ===
List of shipwrecks: 13 August 1812
Ship	State	Description
Crown	United Kingdom	The ship ran aground on Scroby Sands, Norfolk and sank.
Jason	United Kingdom	The ship was run down and sunk. Her crew were rescued by Hopewell (United Kingdom). Jason was on a voyage from Guadeloupe to London.
Pellew	United Kingdom	The ship ran aground on Scroby Sands.

=== 14 August ===
List of shipwrecks: 14 August 1812
Ship	State	Description
HMS Chub	Royal Navy	The Ballahoo-class schooner was wrecked off the Sambro Island Lighthouse, Nova Scotia, British North America with the loss of all twenty crew.
Fame	United Kingdom	The ship was abandoned in the Atlantic Ocean. Her crew were rescued by Antigua (United Kingdom). Fame was on a voyage from Jamaica to London.

=== 15 August ===
List of shipwrecks: 15 August 1812
Ship	State	Description
Samuel	United Kingdom	The ship was driven ashore at Otterton, Devon. She was on a voyage from Sunderland, County Durham to Sidmouth and Exmouth, Devon.
William	United Kingdom	The ship was driven ashore and wrecked at St. Austell, Cornwall. She was on a voyage from Swansea, Glamorgan to Fowey, Cornwall.

=== 16 August ===
List of shipwrecks: 16 August 1812
Ship	State	Description
Africaine	United Kingdom	The ship was capsized by a water spout off Cape Matapan, Greece. She was on a voyage from Malta to Constantinople.
Lord Nelson	United Kingdom	The ship schooner ran aground on the McCammon Rock and was severely damaged. She was on a voyage from Liverpool to Saltcoats, Ayrshire. Lord Nelson was later refloated.

=== 19 August ===
List of shipwrecks: 19 August 1812
Ship	State	Description
USS Etna	United States Navy	1812 Louisiana hurricane: The ketch was sunk off New Orleans, Louisiana in a hurricane. 2 crew killed.
HMS Guerriere	Royal Navy	USS Constitution and HMS Guerriere. War of 1812, USS Constitution vs HMS Guerriere: The fifth-rate frigate was captured by the frigate USS Constitution (United States Navy). She was set afire and sunk due to battle damage received.
Providence	United Kingdom	The ship ran aground on the Gunfleet Sand, in the North Sea off the coast of Essex. She was on a voyage from London to Newcastle upon Tyne, Northumberland. She was refloated and taken in to Harwich, Essex in a severely leaky condition.

=== 20 August ===
List of shipwrecks: 20 August 1812
Ship	State	Description
Alchimedes	United Kingdom	1812 Louisiana hurricane: The brig was driven ashore at New Orleans, Louisiana.
Betsey	United States	1812 Louisiana hurricane: The schooner was driven ashore at New Orleans.
HMS Brazen	Royal Navy	1812 Louisiana hurricane: The Bittern-class ship-sloop was driven ashore at the mouth of the Mississippi River and was severely damaged.
Buckskin	United States	1812 Louisiana hurricane: The privateer was lost at New Orleans.
Ceres	United States	1812 Louisiana hurricane: The ship was driven ashore and severely damaged at New Orleans.
Cumberland	United Kingdom	1812 Louisiana hurricane: The schooner was destroyed at New Orleans.
Devina Pastora	(United States) Louisiana Territory	1812 Louisiana hurricane: The Polacre was driven ashore and severely damaged at New Orleans.
Enterprize	United States	1812 Louisiana hurricane: The brig was driven ashore at New Orleans.
Erie	United States	1812 Louisiana hurricane: The ketch sank at New Orleans.
Felix	United States	1812 Louisiana hurricane: The privateer was driven ashore and damaged at New Orleans.
Harlequin	United States	1812 Louisiana hurricane: The ship foundered at New Orleans with the loss of all but two of her crew.
Iris	United States	1812 Louisiana hurricane: The full-rigged ship was driven ashore at New Orleans.
Juno	United States	1812 Louisiana hurricane: The full-rigged ship was driven ashore at New Orleans.
Liberty	(United States) Louisiana Territory	1812 Louisiana hurricane: The schooner sank at New Orleans.
Maria	United States	1812 Louisiana hurricane: The brig was destroyed at New Orleans.
Missouri	United States	1812 Louisiana hurricane: The full-rigged ship was driven ashore at New Orleans.
Oliver Elsworth	United States	1812 Louisiana hurricane: The ship was driven ashore and severely damaged at New Orleans.
Paragon	United States	1812 Louisiana hurricane: The full-rigged ship was driven ashore and severely damaged at New Orleans.
Reliance	United States	1812 Louisiana hurricane: The brig was driven ashore at New Orleans. She was deemed irreparable.
Sally Ann	United States	1812 Louisiana hurricane: The brig was driven ashore at New Orleans.
HMS Southampton	Royal Navy	1812 Louisiana hurricane: The Southampton-class frigate was driven ashore at the mouth of the Mississippi River and severely damaged.
Suffolk	United States	1812 Louisiana hurricane: The ship was driven ashore at New Orleans.
Viper	United States	1812 Louisiana hurricane: The brig was driven ashore and severely damaged at New Orleans.
Washington	United States	1812 Louisiana hurricane: The full-rigged ship was irreparably damaged at New Orleans.
William	United Kingdom	1812 Louisiana hurricane :The brig was driven ashore at New Orleans.
William & Mary	United States	1812 Louisiana hurricane: The schooner sank at New Orleans.

=== 22 August ===
List of shipwrecks: 22 August 1812
Ship	State	Description
Marina	United Kingdom	The ship foundered in the Atlantic Ocean. She was on a voyage from Jamaica to London.

=== 26 August ===
List of shipwrecks: 26 August 1812
Ship	State	Description
Lord Cochrane	United Kingdom	The ship foundered in the Atlantic Ocean 150 nautical miles (280 km) east of the Bahamas with the loss of all on board. She was on a voyage from Jamaica to the United Kingdom.

=== 27 August ===
List of shipwrecks: 27 August 1812
Ship	State	Description
Jamaica Planter	United Kingdom	The ship was sighted off Bermuda while on a voyage from Jamaica to London. Presumed foundered with the loss of all hands.

=== 28 August ===
List of shipwrecks: 28 August 1812
Ship	State	Description
Harry	United Kingdom	The ship capsized off "St. Salvadore" with the loss of a crew member.
Jane	United Kingdom	The ship was lost at Great Yarmouth, Norfolk. Her crew were rescued. She was on a voyage from Newcastle upon Tyne, Northumberland to Colchester, Essex.
Louth Packet	United Kingdom	The ship was lost near Cromer, Norfolk. She was on a voyage from Barton-upon-Humber, Lincolnshire to London.
Mariner	United Kingdom	The ship foundered in the Atlantic Ocean (approximately 32°30′N 70°00′W) in a hurricane with the loss of all hands. She was on a voyage from Jamaica to London.
Minerva	United Kingdom	The ship foundered in the Atlantic Ocean (approximately 32°30′N 70°00′W) in a hurricane with the loss of all hands. She was on a voyage from Jamaica to London.
Nile	United Kingdom	The ship foundered in the Atlantic Ocean (approximately 32°30′N 70°00′W) in a hurricane with the loss of all hands. She was on a voyage from Jamaica to London.
Providence Endeavour	United Kingdom	The ship was lost at Huntcliff Foot, Yorkshire. Her crew were rescued.

=== 29 August ===
List of shipwrecks: 29 August 1812
Ship	State	Description
True Blue	United Kingdom	The ship sprang a leak and was abandoned. HMS Amaranthe (Royal Navy), rescued the crew. True Blue was on a voyage from Saint Lucia to Waterford.

=== 30 August ===
List of shipwrecks: 31 August 1812
Ship	State	Description
Two unnamed vessels	United Kingdom	The colliers ran aground on the Long Sand, in the North Sea off the coast of Essex and were wrecked with the loss of all hands.

=== 31 August ===
List of shipwrecks: 31 August 1812
Ship	State	Description
Sophrona	United Kingdom	The ship was lost off Sandy Point, Newfoundland, British North America. Her crew were rescued. She was on a voyage from Quebec City, Lower Canada, British North America to Dublin.

=== Unknown date ===
List of shipwrecks: Unknown date in August 1812
Ship	State	Description
Lady Warren	United Kingdom	War of 1812: The ship was captured by USS Constitution (United States Navy while on a voyage from Newfoundland, British North America to Liverpool, Nova Scotia, British North America. She was set afire and sunk.
May de Deos	Portugal	The ship ran aground at Fernando de Noronha, Brazil. She was on a vpyage from Pernambuco, Brazil to São Miguel Island, Azores. She floated off and came ashore at Siara, Brazi and was wrecked.
Rosario	United Kingdom	The ship departed from Gibraltar for Madeira. No further trace, presumed foundered with the loss of all hands.

== September ==
=== 1 September ===
List of shipwrecks: 1 September 1812
Ship	State	Description
Caliban	United States	The ship ran aground on the Sunk Sand, in the North Sea off the coast of Essex, United Kingdom. She was on a voyage from Saint Petersburg, Russia to Boston, Massachusetts. Caliban was later refloated and taken in to Harwich, Essex.
Enterprize	United Kingdom	The ship ran aground on the Herd Sand, in the North Sea off the coast of County Durham. She was later refloated.
Friendship	United Kingdom	The ship ran aground on the Herd Sand. She was later refloated.
Mary	United Kingdom	The ship was wrecked on the Herd Sand.
Medway	United Kingdom	The ship ran aground on the Herd Sands. She was later refloated.
Oughton	United Kingdom	The ship was wrecked on the Herd Sand.

=== 2 September ===
List of shipwrecks: 2 September 1812
Ship	State	Description
Sir John Borlase Warren	United Kingdom	The ship was abandoned in the Atlantic Ocean (28°00′N 68°20′W). She was on a voyage from Trinidad to Bermuda.

=== 4 September ===
List of shipwrecks: 4 September 1812
Ship	State	Description
Danaé	French Navy	The Consolante-class frigate was destroyed by an onboard explosion at Trieste, Austrian Empire.

=== 6 September ===
List of shipwrecks: 6 September 1812
Ship	State	Description
Pomona	United Kingdom	The ship foundered in the Pentland Firth. Her crew were rescued. She was on a voyage from Stockholm, Sweden to Dublin.
Yedinorog (Единорог, 'Unicorn')	Imperial Russian Navy	French invasion of Russia: The sloop-of-war ran aground 3 nautical miles (5.6 km) north of Cape Kolka in the Gulf of Riga. Her crew were rescued and the ship was burnt to prevent capture by the French.

=== 9 September ===
List of shipwrecks: 9 September 1812
Ship	State	Description
Minerva	United Kingdom	The ship departed from Grenada for Newfoundland, British North America. No further trace, presumed foundered with the loss of all hands.

=== 10 September ===
List of shipwrecks: 10 September 1812
Ship	State	Description
Juffrouw Etje Buss	Flag unknown	The ship departed Saint Petersburg, Russia for London. No further trace, presumed foundered with the loss of all hands.

=== 17 September ===
List of shipwrecks: 17 September 1812
Ship	State	Description
Fernando Septimo	Spain	Napoleonic Wars: The ship was captured and burnt in Ensinada Bay by a squadron of ships from the United Provinces of the Río de la Plata.
Olive	United Kingdom	The ship was wrecked on the Isle of Pines, Captaincy General of Cuba. Her crew were rescued. She was on a voyage from Jamaica to Halifax, Nova Scotia, British North America.

=== 21 September ===
List of shipwrecks: 21 September 1812
Ship	State	Description
Yeoman's Glory	United Kingdom	The ship ran aground in the King's Channel and sank. She was on a voyage from Waterford to Liverpool.

=== 22 September ===
List of shipwrecks: 22 September 1812
Ship	State	Description
Betsey	United Kingdom	The ship departed from Rio de Janeiro for London. No further trace, presumed foundered with the loss of all hands.
Sally	United Kingdom	The ship sprang a leak and was abandoned by her crew. She was on a voyage from Boston, Lincolnshire to Cádiz, Spain.

=== 24 September ===
List of shipwrecks: 24 September 1812
Ship	State	Description
Valiant	United Kingdom	Napoleonic Wars: The ship was abandoned by her crew in the English Channel off St Alban's Head, Dorset when they mistook Swift (United Kingdom for a French privateer. She was taken possession of by Swift and taken in to Portsmouth, Hampshire.

=== 27 September ===
List of shipwrecks: 27 September 1812
Ship	State	Description
HMS Barbadoes	Royal Navy	The frigate was wrecked on Sable Island, Nova Scotia, British North America with the loss of a crew member. The rest of her crew were rescued.
Emmeline	United Kingdom	The schooner was wrecked on Sable Island. Her crew were rescued. She was on a voyage from Bermuda to Newfoundland, British North America.
Espadarte	Portugal	The ship departed Rio de Janeiro for Lisbon. No further trace, presumed foundered with the loss of all hands.
Swift	United Kingdom	The ship was wrecked on Sable Island. Her crew were rescued. She was on a voyage from Bermuda to Newfoundland.

=== 29 September ===
List of shipwrecks: 29 September 1812
Ship	State	Description
President Adams	United States	The ship was wrecked on the coast of China. Her crew survived.
Matilda	United Kingdom	The sloop was driven ashore and wrecked at Brixham, Devon.
Trafalgar	United Kingdom	The ship was driven ashore and wrecked at Sizewell, Suffolk. Her crew were rescued. She was on a voyage from North Shields, Northumberland to London.

=== 30 September ===
List of shipwrecks: 30 September 1812
Ship	State	Description
Mercury	United Kingdom	The ship was wrecked on Gotland. She was on a voyage from Saint Petersburg, Russia to London.
Young William	United Kingdom	The ship ran aground off Berry Head, Devon and was severely damaged. She was later refloated and taken in to Brixham, Devon. Young William was on a voyage from Newcastle upon Tyne, Northumberland to Porto, Portugal.

=== Unknown date ===
List of shipwrecks: Unknown date in September 1812
Ship	State	Description
Concord	United Kingdom	War of 1812: The ship was captured and plundered by an American ship. She was abandoned, but was subsequently taken in to Saint John, New Brunswick, British North America.
Hero	(United Kingdom of Great Britain and Ireland) Guernsey	War of 1812: The ship was captured in the Atlantic Ocean (approximately 46°N 57°W) by USS Essex (United States Navy) while on a voyage from Guernsey to Miramichi Bay. She was set afire and sunk.
Hopewell	United Kingdom	War of 1812:The ship was captured by Comet (United States). She subsequently ran aground on the Bodkin Knowles.
HMS Magnet	Royal Navy	The brig-sloop foundered in the Atlantic Ocean off the coast of the United States with the loss of all hands. She was on a voyage from Spithead, Hampshire to Halifax, Nova Scotia, British North America.
Mary	United Kingdom	War of 1812: The ship was captured by the Americans and scuttled.
Nancy	United Kingdom	War of 1812: The ship was captured in the Grand Banks of Newfoundland by USS Essex (United States Navy) while on a voyage from Gibraltar to Newfoundland, British North America. She was set afire and sunk.
Rhadamanthe	United Kingdom	The ship was lost between Huelva and Ayamonte, Spain.
Unnamed	France	Napoleonic Wars: The privateer was destroyed off Scio, Ottoman Greece by HMS Theodosia (Royal Navy).

== October ==
=== 3 October ===
List of shipwrecks: 3 October 1812
Ship	State	Description
James Dunlop	United Kingdom	The ship was wrecked on Anticosti Island, Lower Canada, British North America. She was on a voyage from the Clyde to Quebec City. Lower Canada.
Lady Augusta	United Kingdom	The ship departed from Liverpool for Sligo, Ireland. No further trace, presumed foundered with the loss of all hands.

=== 4 October ===
List of shipwrecks: 4 October 1812
Ship	State	Description
James Dunlop	United Kingdom	The ship was wrecked on Anticosti Island, British North America. She was on a voyage from Greenock, Renfrewshire to Quebec City, Lower Canada, British North America.
Norge	(Denmark) Norway	The ship was driven ashore near Campbeltown, Argyllshire, United Kingdom.

=== 5 October ===
List of shipwrecks: 5 October 1812
Ship	State	Description
Brown	United Kingdom	The ship was wrecked in the Little Caicos Islands. Her crew were rescued. She was on a voyage from Saint-Domingue to London.
Mary	United Kingdom	The ship was lost at Mazzara, Sicily. She was on a voyage from Smyrna, Ottoman Empire to London.

=== 6 October ===
List of shipwrecks: 6 October 1812
Ship	State	Description
Betsey	United Kingdom	The ship was driven ashore on Grenada. She was on a voyage from Newfoundland, British North America to Grenada. She was refloated.
HMS Nimble	Royal Navy	The Nimble-class cutter struck a rock in the Kattegat and was wrecked. Her crew were rescued.

=== 7 October ===
List of shipwrecks: 7 October 1812
Ship	State	Description
Enterprize	United Kingdom	The sloop was driven ashore and wrecked at Plymouth, Devon.

=== 8 October ===
List of shipwrecks: 8 October 1812
Ship	State	Description
Nancy	United Kingdom	The sloop foundered in the Irish Sea off St. Ann's Head, Pembrokeshire with the loss of a crew member. She was on a voyage from Waterford to Swansea, Glamorgan.
Sally	United Kingdom	The ship was wrecked at North Shields, County Durham. Her crew were rescued by the Shields Lifeboat.
No. 52	Imperial Russian Navy	The transport ship sprang a leak and was beached on Ruhnu. Her crew were rescued. She was on a voyage from Sveaborg, Grand Duchy of Finland to Riga. She was subsequently wrecked by ice.

=== 9 October ===
List of shipwrecks: 9 October 1812
Ship	State	Description
Elizabeth	Sweden	The ship sailed from Karlshamn. No further trace, presumed foundered with the loss of all hands.

=== 10 October ===
List of shipwrecks: 10 October 1812
Ship	State	Description
Amelia Sophia	United Kingdom	The ship was lost near Karlskrona, Sweden. She was on a voyage from Saint Petersburg, Russia to Grangemouth, Stirlingshire.
Catherine	Russia	The ship was driven ashore near Cross Island, County Down, United Kingdom.
Harmony	United Kingdom	The ship ran aground on the Haisborough Sands, in the North Sea off the coast of Norfolk. She was on a voyage from Newcastle upon Tyne, Northumberland to London.
Mangalore	United Kingdom	The ship was wrecked off Sumatra while on a voyage from Calcutta to Port Jackson, New South Wales.

=== 11 October ===
List of shipwrecks: 11 October 1812
Ship	State	Description
Arthur	Flag unknown	The ship was driven ashore on Rügen, Swedish Pomerania. She was either wrecked or was burnt by HMS Aquilon (Royal Navy) on 14 October. Her crew were rescued.
HMS Centinel	Royal Navy	The gun-brig was driven ashore on Rügen. She was destroyed by her crew before they were rescued.
Eleonora Henrietta	Flag unknown	The ship was driven ashore on Rügen. She was either wrecked or was burnt by HMS Aquilon (Royal Navy) on 14 October. Her crew were rescued.
Enigheit	Flag unknown	The ship was driven ashore on Rügen. She was either wrecked or was burnt by HMS Aquilon (Royal Navy) on 14 October. Her crew were rescued. Einigheit was on a voyage from Saint Petersburg, Russia to London.
Fortuna	Flag unknown	The ship was driven ashore on Rügen. She was either wrecked or was burnt by HMS Aquilon (Royal Navy) on 14 October. Her crew were rescued.
Johannes	Flag unknown	The ship was driven ashore on Rügen. She was either wrecked or was burnt by HMS Aquilon (Royal Navy) on 14 October. Her crew were rescued.
Johannes & Sigismund	Flag unknown	The ship was driven ashore on Rügen. She was either wrecked or was burnt by HMS Aquilon (Royal Navy) on 14 October. Her crew were rescued.
Neptunus	Flag unknown	The ship was driven ashore on Rügen. She was either wrecked or was burnt by HMS Aquilon (Royal Navy) on 14 October. Her crew were rescued.
Prefung	Flag unknown	The ship was driven ashore on Rügen. She was either wrecked or was burnt by HMS Aquilon (Royal Navy) on 14 October. Her crew were rescued.
Rammen	Flag unknown	The ship was driven ashore on Rügen. She was either wrecked or was burnt by HMS Aquilon (Royal Navy) on 14 October. Her crew were rescued. Rammen was on a voyage from Saint Petersburg to Portsmouth, Hampshire, United Kingdom.
Speedwell	United Kingdom	The ship departed Cork for London. No further trace, presumed foundered with the loss of all hands.

=== 12 October ===
List of shipwrecks: 12 October 1812
Ship	State	Description
Agnes	United Kingdom	The brig was driven ashore at Kingston, Jamaica.
Atlas	United Kingdom	The full-rigged ship was driven ashore at Fort Augusta, Jamaica.
Aurora	United Kingdom	The schooner sank at Kingston.
Australien	United Kingdom	The ship foundered in the White Sea. She was on a voyage from London to Arkhangelsk, Russia.
Bachelor	United Kingdom	The sloop was driven ashore at Kingston.
Caroline	Spain	The schooner was driven ashore at The Narrows, Jamaica.
Catherine Lane	United Kingdom	The schooner was driven ashore at Kingston.
Clarendon	United Kingdom	The sloop sank at Kingston.
Cumberland	United Kingdom	The full-rigged ship was driven ashore at The Narrows.
Cyrus	United Kingdom	The ship was driven ashore at Lucea, Jamaica.
Dal	United States	The barque, a prize, was driven ashore at The Narrows, Jamaica.
Dos Amigos	Spain	The brig was driven ashore and severely damaged at Kingston.
Endeavour	United Kingdom	The sloop was driven ashore at Black River, Jamaica.
Enterprize	United Kingdom	The schooner was driven ashore at Fort Augusta.
Esperanza	Spain	The schooner was driven ashore at Kingston.
Hassan	United Kingdom	The full-rigged ship was driven ashore in The Narrows. She was on a voyage from Gibraltar to Havana, Cuba.
Henry	United Kingdom	The schooner was driven ashore at Montego Bay, Jamaica.
Hercules	United Kingdom	The ship was driven ashore at Morant Bay, Jamaica.
James	United Kingdom	The schooner was driven ashore and wrecked at Kingston.
Little Mary	United Kingdom	The schooner capsized in Milk River, Jamaica with the loss of all but one of her crew.
London	United Kingdom	The sloop was driven ashore at Black River.
Madisonia	United States	The schooner, a prize, was driven ashore at The Narrows, Jamaica.
Maria	Spain	The schooner sank at Kingston.
Mary	United Kingdom	The schooner was driven ashore at Kingston.
Melville	United Kingdom	The schooner was driven ashore at Kingston.
Minorca	United Kingdom	The schooner sank at Kingston.
Nancy	United Kingdom	The schooner was driven ashore at Kingston.
Nelson	United Kingdom	The schooner sank at Kingston.
Nostra Señor del Carmen	Spain	The schooner sank at Kingston.
Perseverance	United Kingdom	The sloop sank at Kingston.
Peru	United States	The brig, a prize, was driven ashore at Kingston.
Phœnix	United Kingdom	Captain Sinclair's schooner sank at Kingston.
Phœnix	United Kingdom	Captain Oliver's schooner sank at Kingston.
Planter	United Kingdom	The sloop was driven ashore at Kingston.
Pomona	Spain	The sloop was driven ashore at Kingston.
Poor Sailor	United Kingdom	The privateer schooner was driven ashore at Hunt's Bay, Jamaica.
Prince	United Kingdom	The full-rigged ship was driven ashore at Kingston. She was later refloated.
Rose	United Kingdom	The ship was driven ashore at Montego Bay.
San Isidero	Spain	The schooner sank at Kingston.
Santa Clara	Spain	The schooner was driven ashore and wrecked at Kingston.
Santa Margaretta	Spain	The schooner was driven ashore at Kingston.
Supply	United Kingdom	The schooner was driven ashore at Kingston.
Swift	United Kingdom	The schooner was driven ashore at Fort Augusta.
San Bernardino	United States	The brig, a prize, was driven ashore at Kingston.
Surprise	United Kingdom	The sloop foundered off Port Maria, Jamaica.
Susan	United Kingdom	The sloop was driven ashore and wrecked at Kingston.
Tamer	United Kingdom	The sloop was driven ashore at Kingston.
Venus	United Kingdom	The brig was driven ashore and wrecked at Kingston.

=== 14 October ===
List of shipwrecks: 14 October 1812
Ship	State	Description
Harriet	British East India Company	The East Indiaman was destroyed by fire at Bengal, India. Her crew survived.
Scourrier	United Kingdom	The ship was driven ashore near Bideford, Devon. She was on a voyage from Falmouth, Cornwall to Newport, Monmouthshire.

=== 15 October ===
List of shipwrecks: 15 October 1812
Ship	State	Description
Friendship	United Kingdom	The ship was driven ashore near Hurst Castle, Hampshire. she was on a voyage from Cardiff, Glamorgan to London. She was later refloated and taken in to Cowes, Isle of Wight.
Rover	United Kingdom	The ship sprang a leak and foundered in the English Channel off Portland, Dorset. Her crew were rescued. She was on a voyage from Weymouth, Dorset to Guernsey.
West Indian	United Kingdom	The ship capsized in the Atlantic Ocean off Cape Hatteras, North Carolina, United States. Three survivors were rescued on 29 October by Washington (United States). West Indian was on a voyage from British Honduras to Milford Haven, Pembrokeshire.

=== 16 October ===
List of shipwrecks: 16 October 1812
Ship	State	Description
Concordia	United Kingdom	The ship foundered off Helsingør, Denmark.
Friend' Assistance	United Kingdom	The pilot cutter foundered in the North Sea off Great Yarmouth, Norfolk with the loss of all hands.

=== 18 October ===
List of shipwrecks: 18 October 1812
Ship	State	Description
Cyrus	(United Kingdom of Great Britain and Ireland) British North America	The ship departed Newfoundland for Jamaica. No further trace, presumed foundered with the loss of all hands.
Flying Fish	United Kingdom	The ship was driven ashore and wrecked at "Bury".
General Moore	United Kingdom	The ship was driven ashore at Duncannon, County Wexford.
Nile	United Kingdom	The ship was driven ashore. She was on later refloated and put into Weymouth, Dorset.

=== 19 October ===
List of shipwrecks: 19 October 1812
Ship	State	Description
Belize	United Kingdom	The ship was driven ashore and severely damaged at Milford Haven, Pembrokeshire. She was on a voyage from Brazil to Liverpool.
Betsey	United Kingdom	The ship was driven ashore and wrecked at Milford Haven. She was on a voyage from Newport, Monmouthshire to Youghal, County Cork.
Betsey	United States	The schooner was driven ashore and wrecked at Plymouth, Devon, United Kingdom.
Boston	United States	The brig was driven ashore and wrecked at Plymouth.
Brothers	United Kingdom	The ship was driven ashore at Swansea. She was later refloated.
Brothers	United Kingdom	The ship sprang a leak and was abandoned off Lundy Island. She was later driven ashore at Oxwich, Glamorgan and was severely damaged. Brothers was later refloated.
Buckle	United Kingdom	The ship was driven ashore at Dale, Pembrokeshire.
Caroline	United States	The schooner was driven ashore at Plymouth.
Castle Malgwyn	United Kingdom	The ship was driven ashore and wrecked at Milford Haven.
Coventry	United Kingdom	The West Indiaman was driven ashore at Plymouth. She was later refloated.
Dove	United Kingdom	The ship was driven ashore at Milford Haven.
Eclipse	United Kingdom	The ship was driven ashore at Plymouth.
Eliza	United Kingdom	The ship was driven ashore at Swansea. She was later refloated.
Eliza	United Kingdom	The ship was driven ashore at Harwich, Essex. She was on a voyage from Dundee, Forfarshire to London.
Emlyn	United Kingdom	The ship was driven ashore and wrecked at Milford Haven.
Evrington	United Kingdom	The ship was driven ashore at Swansea. She was later refloated.
Fortitude	United Kingdom	The ship was driven ashore at Swansea. She was later refloated.
Friendship	United Kingdom	The ship was driven ashore at St. Ives, Cornwall. she was on a voyage from Neath, Glamorgan to London.
Gascon	United States	The schooner was driven ashore at Plymouth.
Gascoyne	United Kingdom	The ship was driven ashore at Plymouth.
General Gates	United States	The ship was driven ashore and wrecked at Plymouth.
Geni	France	The ship was driven ashore and wrecked at Plymouth.
Harmony	United Kingdom	The ship was driven ashore at Swansea. She was later refloated.
Hebe	United Kingdom	The ship was lost near Saltfleet, Lincolnshire. Her crew were rescued. She was on a voyage from Teignmouth, Devon to Hull, Yorkshire.
Hirondelle	United States	The schooner was driven ashore at Plymouth.
Horace	United States	The ship was driven ashore and wrecked at Plymouth. She was on a voyage from the Mediterranean to London.
HMS Insolent	Royal Navy	The gun-brig was driven ashore at Swansea. She was later refloated.
Irish Miner	United Kingdom	The ship was driven ashore and wrecked at Milford Haven.
Jane & Mary	United Kingdom	The ship was driven ashore at Swansea. She was later refloated.
Jeanie	United Kingdom	The ship was driven ashore and wrecked at Swansea.
Jewel	United Kingdom	The ship was driven ashore and wrecked at Milford Haven.
John Edward	United Kingdom	The ship was driven ashore and wrecked at Milford Haven.
Joseph	United Kingdom	The ship was driven ashore at Swansea. She was later refloated.
Lucy	United Kingdom	The ship was driven ashore and wrecked at Milford Haven. She was on a voyage from Swansea to Waterford.
Minerva	United Kingdom	The ship was driven ashore and wrecked at Milford Haven. She was on a voyage from Liverpool to Cork.
Perseverance	United Kingdom	The ship sank at Swansea. She was later refloated.
Perseverance	United Kingdom	The ship was driven ashore and wrecked at Milford Haven. She was on a voyage from Liverpool to Galway.
Prince William	United Kingdom	The ship was driven ashore and wrecked at Milford Haven. She was on a voyage from Llanelli, Glamorgan to Cork.
Providence	United Kingdom	The ship, homeported in Galway, was driven ashore and wrecked at Milford Haven.
Providence	United Kingdom	The ship, homeported in Liverpool, was driven ashore and wrecked at Milford Haven.
Providence	United Kingdom	The ship was wrecked in Mill Bay, Plymouth.
Providence	United Kingdom	The schooner foundered off Swansea.
Providence	United Kingdom	The ship was driven ashore and wrecked at Milford Haven. She was on a voyage from Galway to Poole, Dorset.
Redress	United Kingdom	The ship was driven ashore and wrecked at Plymouth.
Royal George	United Kingdom	The ship was driven ashore and wrecked at Milford Haven. She was on a voyage from Newport to Cork.
Sally and William	United Kingdom	The ship was driven ashore at Swansea. She was later refloated.
Salt Cat	United Kingdom	The ship was driven ashore and wrecked at St Mawes, Cornwall. She was on a voyage from Teignmouth, Devon to Liverpool.
Sandwich	United Kingdom	The packet ship was driven ashore and wrecked at Pill, Pembrokeshire.
Shelalagh	United Kingdom	The ship was driven ashore and wrecked at Milford Haven. She was on a voyage from Dublin to Cork.
Skylark	United Kingdom	The schooner was driven ashore at Swansea. She was later refloated.
Shylock	United Kingdom	The ship was driven ashore at Swansea. She was later refloated.
Sophia	United Kingdom	The ship was driven ashore and wrecked at Swansea.
Speedwell	United Kingdom	The ship was driven ahsore at Milford Haven.
Star	United Kingdom	The ship was driven ashore and wrecked at Milford Haven. She was on a voyage from Liverpool to Cork.
Susannah	United Kingdom	The ship was driven ashore and wrecked at Milford Haven. She was on a voyage from Newport to Cork.
Thracian	United States	The ship was driven ashore and wrecked at Plymouth.
Vere	United Kingdom	The ship was driven ashore at Swansea. She was later refloated.
Victory	United Kingdom	The ship was driven ashore at Milford Haven.
William	United Kingdom	The ship was driven ashore at Swansea. She was later refloated.
Young Connecticut	United States	The schooner was driven ashore at Plymouth.

=== 20 October ===
List of shipwrecks: 20 October 1812
Ship	State	Description
Isabella	United Kingdom	The ship was wrecked on the Herd Sand, in the North Sea off South Shields, County Durham. Her crew were rescued by the South Shields Lifeboat.

=== 21 October ===
List of shipwrecks: 21 October 1812
Ship	State	Description
Neptune	United Kingdom	The brig ran aground at Mountbatten, Devon. She was on a voyage from Gibraltar to London. She was refloated.

=== 22 October ===
List of shipwrecks: 22 October 1812
Ship	State	Description
Judith	United Kingdom	The ship struck the pier at Ramsgate, Kent and sank. She was on a voyage from Sunderland, County Durham to Weymouth, Dorset

=== 23 October ===
List of shipwrecks: 23 October 1812
Ship	State	Description
Isabella	United Kingdom	The ship was wrecked at North Shields, Northumberland. Her crew were rescued by the Shields Lifeboat.
Trader	United Kingdom	The ship was driven ashore at Ilfracombe, Devon. She was on a voyage from Penzance, Cornwall to Bristol.

=== 24 October ===
List of shipwrecks: 24 October 1812
Ship	State	Description
Antonio	Spain	The ship was wrecked on the North Rocks, Bermuda. Her crew were rescued. She was on a voyage from Havana, Cuba to Tenerife, Canary Islands.

=== 25 October ===
List of shipwrecks: 25 October 1812
Ship	State	Description
Hannah	United Kingdom	The ship was wrecked on the Inner Dowsing Sandbank, in the North Sea off the coast of Norfolk. Her crew were rescued.

=== 26 October ===
List of shipwrecks: 26 October 1812
Ship	State	Description
Assiduous	United Kingdom	The ship was driven ashore near Burry, Glamorgan. She was on a voyage from Waterford to Newport, Monmouthshire.
Caledonia	United Kingdom	The ship was wrecked in the Moray Firth.
Catharina	Portugal	The ship was wrecked at Porto. Her crew were rescued. She was on a voyage from Maranhão, Brazil to Porto.
Orozembo	United States	The cartel was wrecked on the Irish coast with the loss of over 200 lives. There were six survivors. She was on a voyage from Baltimore, Maryland to Liverpool.

=== 27 October ===
List of shipwrecks: 27 October 1812
Ship	State	Description
Commerce	United Kingdom	The ship was driven ashore at Hammersley, Yorkshire.
Cupid	United Kingdom	The ship was driven ashore at Hammersley.
Edward	United Kingdom	The ship was driven ashore at Great Yarmouth, Norfolk. She was on a voyage from Selby, Yorkshire to London.
Emelius	United Kingdom	The schooner was driven ashore and wrecked on Sable Island. Her crew were rescued.
Endeavour	United Kingdom	The ship was driven ashore at Great Yarmouth. She was later refloated.
Fricktar	Sweden	The ship was driven ashore and damaged in the River Thames at Limehouse, Middlesex, United Kingdom. She was on a voyage from London to Gothenburg.
George	United Kingdom	The ship was driven ashore and severely damaged. She was on a voyage from Boston, Lincolnshire to London. George was later refloated and put into Harwich, Essex.
Juno	United Kingdom	The ship was driven ashore on the Sandwich Flats and sank. She was on a voyage from London to Senegal.
Nestor	United Kingdom	The ship was driven ashore on the coast of Essex. She was on a voyage from Sunderland, County Durham to London.
Prosperous	United Kingdom	The ship was driven ashore and wrecked at Harwich, Essex. Her crew were rescued.
Providence	United Kingdom	The ship was wrecked on Scroby Sands, in the North Sea off Great Yarmouth. Her crew were rescued by a fishing vessel.
Saratov (Саратов)	Imperial Russian Navy	The ship of the line was driven ashore and foundered at Harmaja in the Gulf of Finland. Her crew were rescued. She was dismantled in situ.
Swift	United Kingdom	The sloop was driven ashore and wrecked on Sable Island. Her crew were rescued.
Thomas	United Kingdom	The ship was driven ashore at Great Yarmouth.
Union	United Kingdom	The ship was driven ashore at Gorleston, Suffolk. She was on a voyage from London to Limerick.
Vigilant	United Kingdom	The ship was driven ashore at Caister-on-Sea, Norfolk.
Vigilant	United Kingdom	The ship was driven ashore and wrecked at Corton, Suffolk.
Walter	United Kingdom	The ship was driven ashore on the Sandwich Flats and sank. She was on a voyage from Newcastle upon Tyne, Northumberland to Jersey, Channel Islands. She was refloated on 31 October and taken in to Ramsgate, Kent.
York Merchant	United Kingdom	The ship was driven ashore. She was refloated and put into Great Yarmouth.

=== 29 October ===
List of shipwrecks: 29 October 1812
Ship	State	Description
Fly	United Kingdom	The ship foundered off Start Point, Devon with the loss of all but two of her crew. She was on a voyage from Mevagissey, Cornwall to Portsmouth, Hampshire.
Sea Nymph	United Kingdom	The schooner capsized at Ramsgate, Kent and was severely damaged.
Thetis	United Kingdom	The ship was driven ashore and wrecked near Miramichi, New Brunswick, British North America. Her crew were rescued. She was on a voyage from Gibraltar to Miramichi.

=== 30 October ===
List of shipwrecks: 30 October 1812
Ship	State	Description
Korneliya (Корнелия, 'Cornelia')	Imperial Russian Navy	The ship was driven against the quayside at Reval and was wrecked. Her crew were rescued. (Note: Chernyshev gives the date as 30 December.)

=== 31 October ===
List of shipwrecks: 31 October 1812
Ship	State	Description
Lady Augusta	United Kingdom	The ship departed Liverpool for Sligo, Ireland. No further trace, presumed foundered in the Irish Sea with the loss of all hands.

=== Unknown date ===
List of shipwrecks: Unknown date in October 1812
Ship	State	Description
Active	United Kingdom	The ship was driven ashore near Wexford. She was on a voyage from Liverpool, Lancashire to Newfoundland, British North America. She was refloated and taken in to Cork.
Basto	United Kingdom	The ship was wrecked at Oulu, Finland.
Benjamin	United Kingdom	The ship departed from Newfoundland, British North America for Poole, Dorset. No further trace, presumed foundered with the loss of all hands.
Boreas	Russia	Gunboat War: The ship was captured by a Danish privateer while on a voyage from Pärnu to an English port. She was subsequently wrecked on Dragør, Denmark.
Don Rodrigo	Portugal	The ship was lost in the Bengal River. She was on a voyage from Bengal, India to Brazil.
Elizabeth	United Kingdom	The ship was driven ashore on the Scottish coast. She was on a voyage from Bahia, Brazil to Liverpool.
Friendship	United Kingdom	Gunboat War: The ship was captured off Langeland, Denmark by a Danish vessel and was run ashore. She was later burnt by a Royal Navy warship.
Gute Hoffnung	Flag unknown	The ship was lost off Domesnes, Norway. She was on a voyage from London to a Baltic port.
Hobbacott	United Kingdom	The ship foundered in Dublin Bay or Holyhead Bay. Her crew were rescued.
Hoop	Flag unknown	The ship was wrecked on Rügen, Swedish Pomerania. She was on a voyage from Riga, to London.
Mary Ann	United Kingdom	The ship sank at Ramsgate, Kent.
Preston	United Kingdom	The ship foundered while on a voyage from Trinidad to London.
Rhine	United Kingdom	The ship sank in Scapay, Inner Hebrides. She was on a voyage from the Isle of Skye to Liverpool.
See Eenhorn	Flag unknown	The ship ran aground on the Barrow Sand, in the North Sea off the coast of Essex, United Kingdom. Her crew were rescued. She was on a voyage from Arkhangelsk, Russia to London. She was later refloated at taken in to the River Colne.
Success	United Kingdom	The ship was driven ashore on Anholt, Denmark. She was on a voyage from London to Saint Petersburg, Russia. She was refloated and taken in to Gothenburg, Sweden in a leaky condition.
Swift	United Kingdom	The ship ran aground on the Woolpack Sand, in the North Sea. She was on a voyage from Belfast, County Antrim to London. She was refloated and taken in to the River Thames.
Trio	United Kingdom	The ship capsized off the Magdalen Islands, Lower Canada, British North America. Her crew were rescued. She was on a voyage from Portsmouth, Hampshire to Miramichi, New Brunswick, British North America.
Unity	United Kingdom	The ship was driven ashore on Öland, Sweden. She was refloated and taken in to Calmar, Sweden.

== November ==
=== 1 November ===
List of shipwrecks: 1 November 1812
Ship	State	Description
Union	United Kingdom	The ship foundered in the Irish Sea off Great Orme, Caernarfonshire. Her crew were rescued.
Unity	United Kingdom	The ship foundered in the Irish Sea off Great Orme, Caernarfonshire. Her crew were rescued.

=== 2 November ===
List of shipwrecks: 2 November 1812
Ship	State	Description
New Friends	United Kingdom	The ship was wrecked in the Isles of Scilly.

=== 4 November ===
List of shipwrecks: 4 November 1812
Ship	State	Description
Hoffnung	Flag unknown	The ship was lost off the coast of Frise, France. She was on a voyage from Riga, Russia to London.
Lord Nelson	United Kingdom	The ship was driven ashore at Whitby, Yorkshire. She was on a voyage from Sunderland, County Durham to Whitby.

=== 6 November ===
List of shipwrecks: 6 November 1812
Ship	State	Description
Henry	United Kingdom	The ship was lost on the "Savanna Quay". All on board were rescued. She was on a voyage from Montego Bay, Jamaica to the Musquito Shore, West Indies.
Maria	United Kingdom	The ship was lost at St. John's, Newfoundland, British North America. She was on a voyage from St. John's to Liverpool.

=== 7 November ===
List of shipwrecks: 7 November 1812
Ship	State	Description
Trio	United Kingdom	The ship ran aground on the Normand Sand, in the English Channel off the coast of Hampshire and was wrecked. She was on a voyage from London to Curaçao.

=== 8 November ===
List of shipwrecks: 8 November 1812
Ship	State	Description
Earl of Leicester	United Kingdom	The ship departed Portsmouth, Hampshire for Lisbon, Portugal. No further trace, presumed foundered with the loss of all hands.

=== 9 November ===
List of shipwrecks: 9 November 1812
Ship	State	Description
Irmelinda	United Kingdom	The ship was lost in the Abaco Islands. She was on a voyage from the Clyde to New Providence, Bahamas.

=== 11 November ===
List of shipwrecks: 11 November 1812
Ship	State	Description
Milton	United Kingdom	The ship was driven ashore on the Holm Sand, in the River Humber. She was on a voyage from Pictou, Nova Scotia, British North America to Hull, Yorkshire. Milton was later refloated and taken in to Hull.
Wilson	United Kingdom	The ship was wrecked near Plymouth, Devon with the loss of all but two of her crew. She was on a voyage from Swansea, Glamorgan to Plymouth.

=== 12 November ===
List of shipwrecks: 12 November 1812
Ship	State	Description
Brothers	United Kingdom	The ship sprang a leak in the Bristol Channel and was abandoned by her crew. She was on a voyage from Truro, Cornwall to Swansea, Glamorgan. Brothers came ashore near Swansea the next day and was wrecked.
Fame	United Kingdom	The ship was wrecked near Étaples, Pas-de-Calais, France, Her crew were rescued. She was on a voyage from Cádiz, Spain to London.

=== 13 November ===
List of shipwrecks: 13 November 1812
Ship	State	Description
Brothers	United Kingdom	The ship was wrecked at Swansea, Glamorgan. She was on a voyage from Truro, Cornwall to Swansea.

=== 14 November ===
List of shipwrecks: 14 November 1812
Ship	State	Description
Phœnix	Spain	The ship was lost while on a voyage from Philadelphia, Pennsylvania, United States to Vigo. Her crew were rescued.

=== 15 November ===
List of shipwrecks: 15 November 1812
Ship	State	Description
HMS Avenger	Royal Navy	The sloop-of-war was lost at Newfoundland, British North America. Her crew were rescued.
Fortune	United Kingdom	The ship was driven ashore at Caister-on-Sea, Norfolk.
Robert and Sarah	United Kingdom	The brig was driven ashore and wrecked at Caister-on-Sea. She was on a voyage from Great Yarmouth, Norfolk to Newcastle upon Tyne, Northumberland.
Thomas and Eleanor	United Kingdom	The ship was sighted in the Atlantic Ocean (approximately 48°N 7°W) while bound for Lisbon, Portugal. No further trace, presumed foundered with the loss of all hands.
William and Sarah	United Kingdom	The ship was driven ashore and wrecked at Great Yarmouth, Norfolk.

=== 16 November ===
List of shipwrecks: 16 November 1812
Ship	State	Description
Brothers	United Kingdom	The ship was driven ashore and wrecked at Exmouth, Devon.
Caroline	United Kingdom	The ship was driven ashore near the Old Head of Kinsale, County Cork. She was on a voyage from Dublin to Cork.
Diamond	United Kingdom	The ship struck a rock and sank at Whithorn, Dumfriesshire. Her crew were rescued. She was on a voyage from Greenock, Renfrewshire to Whithorn.
Friends	United Kingdom	The ship was driven ashore near Southwold, Suffolk. She was on a voyage from London to King's Lynn, Norfolk.
Friends Goodwill	United Kingdom	The ship was wrecked on the Maplin Sand, in the North Sea off the coast of Essex. Her crew were rescued. She was on a voyage from Newcastle upon Tyne, Northumberland to London.
John	United Kingdom	The ship ran aground on the Gunfleet Sand, in the North Sea off the coast of Essex. She was on a voyage from Liverpool, Lancashire to Gothenburg, Sweden. She was refloated and put in to Harwich, Essex.

=== 17 November ===
List of shipwrecks: 17 November 1812
Ship	State	Description
Susannah	United Kingdom	The ship was wrecked on the Blackstone Rock, off Dartmouth, Devon. Her crew were rescued. She was on a voyage from London to Portsmouth, Hampshire and Dartmouth.
Thomas & Mary	United Kingdom	The ship was run ashore at Happisburgh, Norfolk. She was on a voyage from Hull, Yorkshire to Cley-next-the-Sea, Norfolk.

=== 18 November ===
List of shipwrecks: 18 November 1812
Ship	State	Description
Venus	United Kingdom	The ship foundered in the North Sea off the coast of Suffolk with the loss of all hands.

=== 19 November ===
List of shipwrecks: 19 November 1812
Ship	State	Description
Little Henry	United Kingdom	The ship was wrecked at Christiansand, Norway.

=== 20 November ===
List of shipwrecks: 20 November 1812
Ship	State	Description
Concordia	United Kingdom	The ship ran aground on Kukno Island, in the Baltic Sea while on a voyage from Pernau, Livonia, Russian Empire to London. She was refloated on 24 November but found to be severely damaged and was taken in to "Boldero".
Esther	United States	The ship foundered while bound for Baltimore, Maryland with the loss of all on board.

=== 23 November ===
List of shipwrecks: 23 November 1812
Ship	State	Description
Noysonheid	Flag unknown	The ship was wrecked on the Bondicar Rocks, in the North Sea off Amble, Northumberland, United Kingdom.

=== 24 November ===
List of shipwrecks: 24 November 1812
Ship	State	Description
HMS Belette	Royal Navy	The Cruizer-class brig-sloop struck a rock and foundered of Læsø, Denmark with the loss of 114 of her 120 crew.
Eleanor	United Kingdom	The ship was wrecked in Glenluce Bay. She was on a voyage from Milford Haven, Pembrokeshire to Greenock, Renfrewshire.

=== 25 November ===
List of shipwrecks: 25 November 1812
Ship	State	Description
Maria	United Kingdom	The brig was wrecked in the Strait of Belle Isle. All on board survived. She was on a voyage from Quebec City, Lower Canada, British North America to the River Clyde.
Narova	Russia	The ship was wrecked at Stockholm. She was on a voyage from Pernau, Livonia, Russian Empire to London.
Sea Nymph	United Kingdom	The ship was abandoned in the English Channel off Brighton, Sussex. She was on a voyage from London to Gibraltar. Sea Nymph was subsequently taken in to Shoreham-by-Sea, Sussex.

=== 27 November ===
List of shipwrecks: 27 November 1812
Ship	State	Description
HMS Southampton	Royal Navy	The Southampton-class frigate was wrecked off Conception Island in the Bahamas. Her crew survived.
Virea	United Kingdom	War of the Sixth Coalition: The ship was captured and scuttled north of Kinsale, County Cork by the schooner privateer Brestois (France). She was on a voyage from Cork to Lisbon, Portugal.
USS Vixen	United States Navy	War of 1812: Five days after her capture by the frigate HMS Southampton (Royal Navy), the schooner was wrecked on Conception Island in the Bahamas. Her crew survived.

=== 30 November ===
List of shipwrecks: 30 November 1812
Ship	State	Description
Fortitude	United Kingdom	The ship was wrecked on The Smalls with the loss of ten of her sixteen crew. She was on a voyage from London to Liverpool.
HMS Subtle	Royal Navy	The schooner foundered in a squall off Saint Barthélemy with the loss of all hands.

=== Unknown date ===
List of shipwrecks: Unknown date in November 1812
Ship	State	Description
Alexander	United Kingdom	The ship was driven ashore at Lisbon, Portugal.
Armide	United Kingdom	The ship was driven ashore and wrecked on Skagen, Denmark. She was on a voyage from Saint Petersburg, Russia to Hull, Yorkshire
Boa Fama	Portugal	The ship was wrecked on the coast of Portugal. She was on a voyage from Lisbon to London.
HMS Bonne Citoyenne	Royal Navy	The Bonne Citoyenne-class corvette ran aground in the River Plate in mid-November and was damaged. Subsequently repaired and returned to service.
Bounty	United Kingdom	The ship was driven ashore near Burnt Island, Fife. She was on a voyage from London to Dundee, Forfarshire.
Christina Helena	Flag unknown	The ship was driven ashore at Arkhangelsk, Russia.
Espoir	United Kingdom	War of 1812: The ship was captured and burnt by the privateer Highflyer (United States). She was on a voyage from Trinidad to Antigua.
Farmer	United Kingdom	The ship was lost in the Gulf of Finland.
Favourite	United Kingdom	The ship was driven ashore and wrecked at North Shields, Northumberland.
Hannah	United Kingdom	The ship was abandoned in the Atlantic Ocean of Cape Finisterre, Spain. She was on a voyage from Cork to Lisbon.
Johanna	United Kingdom	The brig was driven ashore at Brighton, Sussex.
Lady Madison	United Kingdom	The ship was wrecked on Gotland, Sweden. She was on a voyage from Saint Petersburg to Liverpool.
Lord Nelson	United Kingdom	The ship was driven ashore near Blue Point. She was on a voyage from London to Saint Petersburg.
Neva	Russian-American Company	The ship struck a rock and sank off Kruzof Island in the Alexander Archipelago in Southeast Alaska. Only 26 of the 75 people on board were rescued a month later.
Queen	United Kingdom	War of 1812: The ship was captured on 11 November by the privateer General Armstrong (United States). She was subsequently wrecked on the Nantucket Shoals with the loss of all hands.
Wilhelmina	United Kingdom	The ship was wrecked on Rügen, Swedish Pomerania. She was on a voyage from Saint Petersburg to London.

== December ==
=== 1 December ===
List of shipwrecks: 4 December 1812
Ship	State	Description
James	United Kingdom	The ship was driven ashore near Vila do Conde, Portugal. she was on a voyage from Waterford to Porto, Portugal,
Union	United Kingdom	War of the Sixth Coalition: The ship was captured and burnt by the privateer Junot (France). She was on a voyage from Limerick to Lisbon, Portugal.

=== 2 December ===
List of shipwrecks: 4 December 1812
Ship	State	Description
Sarah	United Kingdom	The ship ran aground off Lowestoft, Suffolk. She was on a voyage from Smyrna, Russia to Hull, Yorkshire. She was refloated and taken in to Great Yarmouth, Norfolk.

=== 4 December ===
List of shipwrecks: 4 December 1812
Ship	State	Description
Two Sisters	United Kingdom	The ship was wrecked on the Goodwin Sands, Kent. Her crew were rescued. She was on a voyage from Newcastle upon Tyne, Northumberland to Lisbon, Portugal.

=== 5 December ===
List of shipwrecks: 5 December 1812
Ship	State	Description
Donna Maria	United States	The ship was driven ashore and wrecked at Faial, Azores.
Hope	United Kingdom	The ship was wrecked at São Miguel, Azores.
Mary	United Kingdom	The ship was wrecked on Seshar Island. She was on a voyage from Plymouth, Devon to Saint Petersburg, Russia.
Nostra Señora de la Victoria	Spain	The ship was wrecked on the Anegada Reef, Virgin Islands.

=== 6 December ===
List of shipwrecks: 6 December 1812
Ship	State	Description
Amelia	United Kingdom	The ship was wrecked on the Clipper Rock. Her crew were rescued.
Lady Harriet	United Kingdom	War of 1812: The brig, which had been captured in the Turks Islands, was driven ashore at New York, United States. She was on a voyage from Dundee, Forfarshire to Stockholm, Sweden.
Lively	United Kingdom	The ship departed Portsmouth, Hampshire for Lisbon, Portugal. No further trace, presumed foundered with the loss of all hands.
William	United Kingdom	The ship was last sighted on this date. Presumed subsequently foundered with the loss of all hands. She was on a voyage from Martinique to London.

=== 7 December ===
List of shipwrecks: 7 December 1812
Ship	State	Description
Active	United Kingdom	The ship was driven ashore at Caister-on-Sea, Norfolk. She was on a voyage from Wisbech, Cambridgeshire to London.
Emanuel	United Kingdom	The ship was wrecked near Wexford. She was on a voyage from London to Dundalk, County Louth.
Princess Royal	United Kingdom	The ship was lost off Porto, Portugal with the loss of seven of her nine crew. She was on a voyage from Newfoundland to Porto.
Two Friends	United Kingdom	The ship was wrecked at Malahide, County Dublin with the loss of all hands.

=== 8 December ===
List of shipwrecks: 8 December 1812
Ship	State	Description
Rose	United Kingdom	The ship was driven ashore and damaged at Falmouth, Cornwall. She was on a voyage from Liverpool to Malta
Worsly	United Kingdom	The ship was wrecked near Kinsale, County Cork. Her crew were rescued.

=== 9 December ===
List of shipwrecks: 9 December 1812
Ship	State	Description
Lord Nelson	United Kingdom	The ship ran aground on the Herd Sand, in the North Sea off South Shields, County Durham.
Twee Brothers	Denmark-Norway	The ship ran aground on the Herd Sand.
Two Sisters	United Kingdom	The ship was wrecked on the Goodwin Sands, Kent. She was on a voyage from Newcastle upon Tyne, Northumberland to Lisbon, Portugal.

=== 10 December ===
List of shipwrecks: 10 December 1812
Ship	State	Description
Mary	United Kingdom	The ship ran aground and was wrecked at Dublin. She was on a voyage from Dublin to Lisbon, Portugal and Cádiz, Spain.

=== 11 December ===
List of shipwrecks: 11 December 1812
Ship	State	Description
Ann	United Kingdom	The ship was driven ashore at Ballyneshar, County Wexford and was subsequently wrecked. She was on a voyage from Bristol to Dublin.

=== 13 December ===
List of shipwrecks: 13 December 1812
Ship	State	Description
Barbara	United Kingdom	The ship foundered in Bantry Bay. She was on a voyage from London to Malta.
Jane	United Kingdom	The ship was driven ashore at Gibraltar while on a voyage from London to Malta. She was refloated a few days later.
Robert Augustus	United Kingdom	The ship collided with HMS Crane (Royal Navy) and foundered. Her crew were rescued. Robert Augustus was on a voyage from Barbados to Surinam.

=== 15 December ===
List of shipwrecks: 15 December 1812
Ship	State	Description
Benjamin	United Kingdom	The ship foundered in the Atlantic Ocean off Huelva, Spain. Her crew were rescued. She was on a voyage from London to Cádiz, Spain.
Ceres	United Kingdom	The ship ran aground near Marsala, Sicily. She was on a voyage from Heligoland to Malta.
Eclipse	United Kingdom	The ship was wrecked on Bob's Nose, Torbay, Devon. Her crew were rescued. She was on a voyage from London to Plymouth, Devon.
Rose	United Kingdom	The sloop was wrecked at Berwick-upon-Tweed, Northumberland. Her crew were rescued. She was on a voyage from Berwick-upon-Tweed to Leith, Lothian.

=== 16 December ===
List of shipwrecks: 16 December 1812
Ship	State	Description
Elizabeth Cornelia	United Kingdom	The ship departed Villaviciosa, Spain for London. No further trace, presumed foundered with the loss of all hands.
Goodintent	United Kingdom	The ship was lost near Figueira da Foz, Portugal. Her crew were rescued. She was on a voyage from Penzance, Cornwall to Lisbon, Portugal.
Isabella	United Kingdom	The ship was driven ashore near Grimsby, Lincolnshire. She was on a voyage from Hull, Yorkshire to New York, United States.
Mary	United Kingdom	The ship was lost near Figueira da Foz with some loss of life. She was on a voyage from London to Malta.
New Venus	United Kingdom	The ship was lost near Blyth, Northumberland. She was on a voyage from Great Yarmouth, Norfolk to Newcastle upon Tyne, Northumberland.
Thomas and Sally	United Kingdom	The ship was wrecked in the Isles of Scilly. Her crew were rescued. She was on a voyage from Waterford to London.

=== 17 December ===
List of shipwrecks: 17 December 1812
Ship	State	Description
John and Mary	United Kingdom	The ship was driven ashore at Corton, Suffolk. Her crew were rescued. She was on a voyage from Wisbech, Cambridgeshire to London.
William	United Kingdom	The ship was wrecked near Donaghadee, County Down. She was on a voyage from the River Clyde to Buenos Aires.

=== 18 December ===
List of shipwrecks: 18 December 1812
Ship	State	Description
HMS Alban	Royal Navy	The Adonis-class schooner was driven ashore and wrecked at Aldeburgh, Suffolk with the loss of 59 of the 61 people on board.
Cleopatra	United Kingdom	The ship was driven ashore at Figueira da Foz, Portugal. Her crew were rescued.

=== 19 December ===
List of shipwrecks: 19 December 1812
Ship	State	Description
Albert	United States	The ship was driven ashore in the Tagus.
Alexander	United Kingdom	The transport ship was driven ashore at Gibraltar. She was later refloated.
Alliance	United States	The ship was driven ashore in the Tagus.
Amphitrite	United Kingdom	The ship was driven ashore in the Tagus and was wrecked.
Anne Maria	United States	The ship was driven ashore in the Tagus.
Argo	United States	The ship was driven ashore in the Tagus.
Beauty	United States	The ship was driven ashore in the Tagus.
Bee	United Kingdom	The ship was driven ashore near Great Yarmouth, Norfolk. She was on a voyage from Hull, Yorkshire to London.
Betsey	United States	The brig was driven ashore and wrecked in the Tagus.
Britannia	United Kingdom	The transport ship was damaged in the Tagus.
Caroline	United States	The ship was driven ashore in the Tagus.
Commerce	United States	The ship was driven ashore in the Tagus.
Century	United States	The ship was driven ashore in the Tagus.
Charleston	United States	The ship was driven ashore in the Tagus.
Drake	United Kingdom	The ship was driven ashore and wrecked in the Tagus.
Dry Harbour	United Kingdom	The ship was damaged in the Tagus.
Duchess of York	United Kingdom	The ship was damaged in the Tagus.
Eliza Barker	United States	The ship was driven ashore in the Tagus.
Enterprize	United States	The ship was driven ashore in the Tagus.
Fame	United States	The ship was driven ashore in the Tagus.
Felicity	United States	The ship was driven ashore in the Tagus.
Financier	United States	The ship was driven ashore in the Tagus.
Findon	United Kingdom	The ship was damaged in the Tagus.
Favorite	United States	The ship was driven ashore in the Tagus.
Frederick	United States	The ship was driven ashore in the Tagus.
Hannah	United States	The ship was driven ashore and wrecked in the Tagus.
Huntress	United States	The ship was driven ashore in the Tagus.
Jane Frances	United States	The ship was driven ashore in the Tagus.
John & Albert	United States	The ship was driven ashore in the Tagus.
Leopard	United States	The ship was driven ashore in the Tagus.
Liberty	United States	The ship was driven ashore in the Tagus.
Little Cherub	United States	The ship was driven ashore in the Tagus.
Lothaire	United States	The ship was driven ashore in the Tagus.
Maria Penn	United States	The ship was lost in the Tagus. Her crew were rescued.
Meridian	United States	The ship was driven ashore in the Tagus.
Minerva	United States	The ship was driven ashore in the Tagus.
Œolus	United Kingdom	The transport ship was damaged in the Tagus.
HMS Nonpareil	United Kingdom	The ship was damaged in the Tagus and sold there the next year.
Oliver Cromwell	United States	The ship was driven ashore in the Tagus.
Prince Regent	United Kingdom	The ship was driven ashore in the Tagus.
Race Horse	United Kingdom	The ship was damaged in the Tagus.
Rockingham	United States	The ship was driven ashore in the Tagus.
Ruth & Mary	United States	The ship was driven ashore in the Tagus.
Sachem	United States	The ship was driven ashore in the Tagus.
Sally & Mary	United States	The ship was driven ashore in the Tagus.
Savage	United States	The ship was lost in the Tagus. Her crew were rescued.
Ten Brothers	United States	The ship was driven ashore in the Tagus.
Trim	United States	The ship was driven ashore in the Tagus.
Unice	United States	The ship was driven ashore in the Tagus.
Venus	United States	The ship was driven ashore in the Tagus.
Wanderer	United States	The ship was driven ashore in the Tagus.

=== 20 December ===
List of shipwrecks: 20 December 1812
Ship	State	Description
Alert	(United Kingdom of Great Britain and Ireland) Guernsey	War of the Sixth Coalition: The cutter was captured and sunk by the privateer La Mignilonuaise (France). She was on a voyage from Guernsey, Channel Islands to Gibraltar.
Falkirk	United Kingdom	The ship was wrecked at St. Lucar, Spain with the loss of all but two of her crew. She was on a voyage from Newfoundland, British North America to Cádiz, Spain.
George and Dorothy	United Kingdom	War of the Sixth Coalition: The ship was captured and sunk by the privateer La Mignilonuaise (France). She was on a voyage from Limerick to Lisbon, Portugal.
Samuel	United Kingdom	War of the Sixth Coalition: The ship was captured and sunk by the privateer La Mignilonuaise (France). She was on a voyage from Mahón, Spain to Dublin.

=== 21 December ===
List of shipwrecks: 20 December 1812
Ship	State	Description
Sir Sidney Smith	(United Kingdom of Great Britain and Ireland)	The ship, a prize to the US privateer General Armstrong, was totally lost off Nantucket, together with her prize crew.

=== 22 December ===
List of shipwrecks: 22 December 1812
Ship	State	Description
Alligator	United Kingdom	The ship was wrecked near Cádiz, Spain. She was on a voyage from Jersey, Channel Islands to a Mediterranean port.

=== 23 December ===
List of shipwrecks: 23 December 1812
Ship	State	Description
Minerva	United Kingdom	War of the Sixth Coalition: The ship was captured and burnt by Gloire (French Navy). She was on a voyage from Surinam to London.

=== 27 December ===
List of shipwrecks: 27 December 1812
Ship	State	Description
Sprightly	United Kingdom	The ship departed Lisbon, Portugal for London. No further trace, presumed foundered with the loss of all hands.

=== 29 December ===
List of shipwrecks: 29 December 1812
Ship	State	Description
Adventure	(United Kingdom of Great Britain and Ireland) British North America	The ship was driven ashore on the Spanish coast opposite Gibraltar. She was on a voyage from Newfoundland to Palma de Mallorca, Spain. Adventure was refloated in February 1813.
Apollo	United States	The ship was driven ashore at Gibraltar.
Bruce Grove	United Kingdom	The transport ship was driven ashore at Gibraltar, and was consequently condemned. She was destroyed by fire in February 1813.
Camilla	United States	The ship was driven ashore at Gibraltar.
Ceres	United Kingdom	The ship was driven ashore in Algeciras Bay. She was on a voyage from Gibraltar to Surinam. Ceres was refloated in February 1813.
Chatham	United States	The ship was driven ashore at Gibraltar.
Clementson	United Kingdom	The brig was driven ashore and wrecked on Colonsay, Inner Hebrides. Her crew were rescued.
Collingwood	United Kingdom	The ship was driven ashore and wrecked at Málaga, Spain.
Dunkin	United Kingdom	The ship was wrecked near Gibraltar. She was on a voyage from London to Gibraltar.
Henry	United States	The ship was driven ashore at Algeciras, Spain.
Isabella	United Kingdom	The ship was driven ashore at Gibraltar.
John	United States	The ship was driven ashore at Gibraltar.
Louisa	United States	The ship was driven ashore at Gibraltar.
Lydia	United States	The ship was driven ashore at Algeciras.
Miser	United States	The ship was driven ashore at Gibraltar.
Peregrine	United States	The ship was driven ashore between Gibraltar and Algeciras.
Providence	United States	The ship was driven ashore at Gibraltar.
San Joseph	Spain	The ship was wrecked in the Strait of Gibraltar with the loss of 40 of the 42 people on board.
Sophia	United Kingdom	The ship was driven ashore at Gibraltar.
Theresa	United States	The ship was driven ashore at Gibraltar.
Traveller	United Kingdom	The ship departed Falmouth, Cornwall for The Downs. No further trace, presumed foundered in the English Channel with the loss of all hands.
Many unnamed vessels	Spain	The coasters were wrecked near the Rock of Gibraltar.
Unnamed	(Ottoman Empire) Ottoman Greece	The polacca was wrecked near Gibraltar.

=== 30 December ===
List of shipwrecks: 30 December 1812
Ship	State	Description
Fortitude	United Kingdom	The ship was wrecked on The Smalls with the loss of ten of her sixteen crew. She was on a voyage from London to Liverpool.

=== Unknown date ===
List of shipwrecks: Unknown date in December 1812
Ship	State	Description
Anna	Sweden	The ship was lost on the coast of Swedish Pomerania. She was on a voyage from Carlshamn to London.
Aquila	United Kingdom	The ship was driven ashore near Buenos Aires in early December. She was on a voyage from Buenos Aires to London.
Cleopatra	United Kingdom	The ship departed from Plymouth, Devon for Gijón, Spain. No further trace, presumed foundered with the loss of all hands.
Comet	United Kingdom	The ship was lost near Colberg, Swedish Pomerania. Her crew were rescued. She was on a voyage from London to a Baltic port.
Curier	Prussia	The ship was wrecked on the Shipwash Sand, in the North Sea off Harwich, Essex, United Kingdom. She was on a voyage from Rotterdam, Bouches-de-la-Meuse, France to London.
Eagle	United Kingdom	The ship was wrecked on Gogland, Russia. She was on a voyage from Saint Petersburg, Russia to London.
Eliza	United Kingdom	The ship was wrecked at Saint John, New Brunswick, British North America.
Encouragement	United Kingdom	The ship sank at Scarborough, Yorkshire.
Enigheten	Russia	The ship was wrecked on Götaland, Sweden. She was on a voyage from Saint Petersburg to London.
Friendly Emma	United Kingdom	The ship foundered in the Atlantic Ocean 250 nautical miles (460 km) west of the Isles of Scilly. Her crew were rescued by Lady Sherbrook (United Kingdom). Friendly Emma was on a voyage from Saint Vincent to Bristol, Gloucestershire.
Friends	United Kingdom	War of the Sixth Coalition: The ship was captured and burnt by Aréthuse and Rubis (both French Navy). She was on a voyage from Tenerife, Canary Islands to Belfast.
Good Intent	United Kingdom	The ship was run down and sunk in the North Sea off Harwich before 10 December. Her crew were rescued. She was on a voyage from London to Hull, Yorkshire.
Harmony	United Kingdom	The ship was abandoned in the Atlantic Ocean (47°00′N 9°57′W). Her crew were rescued by Fairy (United Kingdom). Harmony was on a voyage from Tenerife, Canary Islands to Hull and Newcastle upon Tyne, Northumberland.
Hornby	United Kingdom	The ship was driven ashore at North Foreland, Kent after 10 December. She was on a voyage from Gravesend, Kent to Saint Domingo. She was refloated and taken in to the River Thames.
Jane	United Kingdom	The ship was lost near Youghal, County Cork. She was on a voyage from Africa to Liverpool.
Juliana Catharina	Russia	The ship was wrecked on Texel, North Holland, First French Empire. She was on a voyage from Saint Petersburg to London.
June	United Kingdom	The brig was driven onto the Sandwich Flats, Kent and was wrecked. She was on a voyage from London to Senegal.
Little Belt	United Kingdom	War of the Sixth Coalition: The ship was captured and burnt by Aréthuse and Rubis (both French Navy). She was on a voyage from Altea, Spain to London.
Lively	United Kingdom	The ship was lost near Gijón, Spain. Her crew were rescued. She was on a voyage from Waterford to Cádiz, Spain.
London Packet	United Kingdom	The ship was run down and sunk in the North Sea off Great Yarmouth, Norfolk. Her crew were rescued. She was on a voyage from North Shields, Northumberland to London.
Maria	United Kingdom	The ship foundered of St. John's, Newfoundland, British North America. She was on a voyage from St. John's to Demerara.
Maria Delorez	Spain	The ship was driven ashore on "Menejo" and sank. She was on a voyage from Gijón to London.
Mariner	United Kingdom	The ship was driven ashore and wrecked at Oracabessa, Jamaica. She was on a voyage from Jamaica to London.
Najade	Russia	The ship was wrecked on "Nawa Island". She was on a voyage from Saint Petersburg to London.
HMS Pembroke	Royal Navy	The ship was driven ashore near Portsmouth in late December. She was refloated on 29 December by HMS Niobe, HMS Pomone and HMS Rosamond (all Royal Navy).
HMS Plumper	Royal Navy	The Archer-class gunbrig was wrecked at Saint John with the loss of most of her crew.
Plymouth	United Kingdom	The ship sank at Scarborough.
Rebecca	United Kingdom	The ship departed from Bermuda for Halifax, Nova Scotia, British North America. No further trace, presumed foundered with the loss of all hands.
Renown	United Kingdom	The ship was wrecked on Gogland. She was on a voyage from Saint Petersburg to London.
Ruby	United Kingdom	The ship was wrecked on Great Cumbrae. She was on a voyage from Glasgow, Renfrewshire to Milford Haven, Pembrokeshire.

== Unknown date ==
List of shipwrecks: Unknown date in 1812
Ship	State	Description
Adventurer	United States	Napoleonic Wars: The ship was captured and destroyed by Andromaque, Ariane and Mameluke (all French Navy) between 21 February and 17 May. She was on a voyage from Saint Croix, Virgin Islands to Boston, Massachusetts.
Alonzo	(flag) Portugal	Napoleonic Wars: Andromaque, Ariane, and Mameluke (all French Navy), destroyed Alonzo between 21 February and 17 May. She was on a voyage from Saint Croix to Portsmouth, New Hampshire, United States.
Amelia Wilson	United Kingdom	The ship capsized and sank at Saint Vincent before 6 May. She was later refloated and repaired.
Amethyst	United Kingdom	Napoleonic Wars: The ship was captured and destroyed by Andromaque, Ariane and Mameluke (all French Navy) between 21 February and 17 May. She was on a voyage from Amelia Island, East Florida, New Spain to Martinique.
Aureliano	United Kingdom	Napoleonic Wars: The ship was captured in the Gulf of Mexico by a French ship and was burnt. She was on a voyage from Falmouth, Cornwall to A Coruña, Spain and Veracruz, Captaincy General of Venezuela.
Bella Africana	Portugal	The ship was driven ashore at Bermuda. She was on a voyage from Lisbon to Baltimore, Maryland, United States.
Bom Fim	Portugal	The ship was lost at Bermuda. She was on a voyage from Lisbon to an American port.
Briton	United Kingdom	Napoleonic Wars: The ship was captured and destroyed by Andromaque, Ariane and Mameluke (all French Navy) between 21 February and 17 May. She was on a voyage from Liverpool to Tortola.
Brothers	United Kingdom	War of 1812: Captain Parmer's ship was captured and destroyed off the coast of Newfoundland, British North America by an American privateer.
Brothers	United Kingdom	War of 1812: Captain Penney's ship was captured and destroyed off the coast of Newfoundland by an American privateer.
Brothers	United Kingdom	Captain Thomas's ship was wrecked on Newfoundland. She was on a voyage from Prince Edward Island, British North America to Bristol, Gloucestershire.
Ceres	United Kingdom	The ship ran aground in Old Harbour, Jamaica and was beached. Having been unloaded, she was proceeding to Kingston, Jamaica for repairs when she struck a rock in Old Harbour and was damaged beyond repair.
Charles	United Kingdom	The ship was crushed by ice and sunk with the loss of all but three of her crew. She was on a voyage from Liverpool to Newfoundland.
Charlton	United Kingdom	The ship was lost in the Red Sea.
Clipper	United Kingdom	The ship was wrecked at the Cape of Good Hope, Cape Colony.
Coromandel	United Kingdom	The ship was lost in the Caramata Passage. Her crew were rescued. She was on a voyage from Bengal, India to Batavia, Netherlands East Indies. She was apparently later salved and repaired.
Crescent	United Kingdom	The ship was lost in the Magdalen Islands, Lower Canada, British North America. She was on a voyage from Quebec City, Lower Canada to London.
Devonshire	United Kingdom	War of 1812: The ship was captured and destroyed off the coast of Newfoundland by an American privateer.
Dispatch	United Kingdom	The ship was wrecked in the Bay of Trapani.
Duc de Dantzig	France	The privateer was wrecked at sea with some loss of life.
Earl of Marchmont	United Kingdom	The ship was lost in the Saint Lawrence River. She was on a voyage from Quebec City, Lower Canada, British North America to Whitby, Yorkshire.
Emily	United Kingdom	Napoleonic Wars: The ship was captured and destroyed by Andromaque, Ariane and Mameluke (all French Navy) between 21 February and 17 May. She was on a voyage from Liverpool to Amelia Island.
Endeavour	(United Kingdom of Great Britain and Ireland) Saint Vincent	War of 1812: The ship was captured and burnt by the privateer Patriot (United States). She was on a voyage from Berbice to Saint Vincent.
Erin	United Kingdom	The ship ran aground on the Seal Islands, off Cape Sable, East Florida, New Spain and was wrecked. She was on a voyage from Wiscasset, Maine, United States to Dublin.
Fame	United Kingdom	The ship was lost at Tobago. She was on a voyage from Madeira to Tobago.
Fame	United Kingdom	War of 1812: The ship was captured and destroyed off the coast of Newfoundland by an American privateer.
Flying Fish	(United Kingdom of Great Britain and Ireland) Nevis	War of 1812: The sloop was captured and burnt by the privateer Jacks Favourite (United States).
Ganges	United States	The ship was abandoned in the Atlantic Ocean. Her crew were rescued by Betsey (United Kingdom). Ganges was on a voyage from Gothenburg, Sweden to Philadelphia, Pennsylvania.
Ganges	United Kingdom	The ship was lost in the Bay of Fundy in late May or early June.
Generous Planter	United Kingdom	Napoleonic Wars: The ship was captured and destroyed by Andromaque, Ariane and Mameluke (all French Navy) between 21 February and 17 May. She was on a voyage from London to Madeira and Jamaica.
Happy Couple	United States	Napoleonic Wars: The ship was captured and destroyed by Andromaque, Ariane and Mameluke (all French Navy) between 21 February and 17 May. She was on a voyage from Baltimore, Maryland to Porto, Portugal.
Harmony	United Kingdom	Napoleonic Wars: The ship was captured and destroyed by Andromaque, Ariane and Mameluke (all French Navy) between 21 February and 17 May. She was on a voyage from Pará, Brazil to Lisbon.
Henry	United Kingdom	Napoleonic Wars: The ship was captured and destroyed by Andromaque, Ariane and Mameluke (all French Navy) between 21 February and 17 May. She was on a voyage from Demerara to London.
Henry	United Kingdom	War of 1812: The ship was captured and destroyed off the coast of Newfoundland by an American privateer.
Hero	United Kingdom	War of 1812: The ship was captured and burnt by USS Essex (United States Navy). Hero was on a voyage from Guernsey, Channel Islands to Miramichi, New Brunswick, British North America.
Imperial	United Kingdom	The ship was wrecked on Sable Island, Nova Scotia, British North America. Her crew were rescued. She was on a voyage from Liverpool to New Brunswick, British North America.
Industry	United Kingdom	The ship capsized at Saint John, New Brunswick, British North America and was wrecked.
Iris	United States	Napoleonic Wars: The ship was captured and destroyed by Andromaque, Ariane and Mameluke (all French Navy) between 21 February and 17 May. She was on a voyage from Rhode Island to Gibraltar.
Jane	United Kingdom	The ship foundered. Her crew were rescued by Quebec (United Kingdom).
Leander	United Kingdom	The ship was wrecked at Alligator Pond, Jamaica. She was on a voyage from Jamaica to London.
Leonidas	United Kingdom	The ship foundered at Spry Harbour, Nova Scotia.
Little Mary	United States	The ship foundered in the Atlantic Ocean. Her crew were rescued. She was on a voyage from Baltimore, Maryland to Lisbon.
Lord Sheffield	United Kingdom	War of 1812: The ship was captured by the privateer Marengo (United States) whilse on a voyage from Tenerife, Canary Islands to Quebec City, Lower Canada, British North America. She was set afire and sunk.
Lord Wellington	United Kingdom	The ship was lost in the Gulf of Florida. She was on a voyage from Jamaica to Cork.
Mãe de Deus	Portugal	The ship was wrecked on Fernando de Noronha. She was on a voyage from Pernambuco, Brazil to São Miguel, Azores and was abandoned by her crew. She refloated herself and was later driven ashore and wrecked at Siara, Brazil.
Mary	United Kingdom	Napoleonic Wars: The ship was captured and destroyed by Andromaque, Ariane and Mameluke (all French Navy) between 21 February and 17 May. She was on a voyage from Havana, Cuba to Smyrna, Ottoman Empire.
Mary	United Kingdom	The ship was sunk by ice.
Mary	United Kingdom	War of 1812: The ship was captured and destroyed by an American vessel. she was on a voyage from Poole, Dorset to Newfoundland.
Mary Ann	United Kingdom	The ship foundered while on a voyage from Jamaica to London.
Mentor	Flag unknown	The brig was lost in the vicinity of "Squan Beach," a term used at the time for the coast of New Jersey near Manasquan and sometimes for the 7-mile (11 km) stretch of coast between Manasquan Inlet and Cranberry Inlet or for the entire coast of New Jersey between Sea Girt and Barnegat Inlet.
Mercury	United States	Napoleonic Wars: The ship was captured and destroyed by Andromaque, Ariane and Mameluke (all French Navy) between 21 February and 17 May. She was on a voyage from New York to Lisbon.
Minerva	Portugal	The ship was lost at Maranhão, Brazil. She was on a voyage from Maranhão to Porto.
Mediterranean Packet	United Kingdom	The ship was driven ashore in the River Plate. She was consequently declared a total loss.
Mexicano	United Kingdom	The ship foundered while on a voyage from Portsmouth, Hampshire to Amelia Island.
Nancy	United Kingdom	War of 1812: The ship captured and destroyed in the Grand Banks of Newfoundland by USS Essex (United States Navy). She was on a voyage from Alicante, Spain to Gibraltar and Newfoundland.
Pizzaro	Portugal	Napoleonic Wars: The ship was captured and destroyed by Andromaque, Ariane and Mameluke (all French Navy) between 21 February and 17 May. She was on a voyage from Madeira to New York.
Polly	United States	Napoleonic Wars: The ship was captured and destroyed by Andromaque, Ariane and Mameluke (all French Navy) between 21 February and 17 May. She was on a voyage from Boston, Massachusetts to Guadeloupe.
Prince Regent	United Kingdom	Napoleonic Wars: The Andromaque, Ariane, and Mameluke (all French Navy), captured and destroyed the ship between 21 February and 17 May. She was on a voyage from Martinique to Lisbon.
Prince Regent	United Kingdom	The ship was driven ashore in White Point Bay, Nova Scotia. She was on a voyage from Whitehaven, Cumberland to New Brunswick. Prince Regent was later refloated and taken in to Liverpool, Nova Scotia.
Princess Royal	United Kingdom	War of 1812: An American privateer captured and burnt the ship. She was on a voyage from Belfast to St. Andrews, New Brunswick, British North America.
Queen Charlotte	United Kingdom	The ship was abandoned in the Atlantic Ocean (50°00′N 37°51′W). Her crew were rescued by Mary (United Kingdom).
Race Horse	United Kingdom	War of 1812: The ship was captured and destroyed off the coast of Newfoundland by an American privateer.
Rocket	United Kingdom	War of 1812: The ship was captured and burnt by an American vessel.
Rosina	United Kingdom	Napoleonic Wars: The ship was captured and destroyed by Andromaque, Ariane and Mameluke (all French Navy) between 21 February and 17 May. She was on a voyage from Lisbon to Tobago.
Sacramento	United States	The ship foundered off Cape May, New Jersey. She was on a voyage from St Ubes, Portugal to New York.
Sally	United States	Napoleonic Wars: The ship was captured and destroyed by Andromaque, Ariane and Mameluke (all French Navy) between 21 February and 17 May. She was on a voyage from Mallorca, Spain to Boston, Massachusetts.
Sally	(United Kingdom of Great Britain and Ireland) British North America	The ship was wrecked on Cape Sable Island. Her crew were rescued.
Sally	United Kingdom	The ship was wrecked on the American coast. Her crew were rescued.
Sally	United Kingdom	The ship was lost on Cape Breton Island, Nova Scotia.
Sampson	United Kingdom	Napoleonic Wars: The ship was captured and destroyed by Andromaque, Ariane and Mameluke (all French Navy) between 21 February and 17 May. She was on a voyage from Lisbon to Saint Croix.
Samuel Whitbread	United Kingdom	The ship capsized in the Saint Lawrence River.
Squid	United Kingdom	War of 1812: The ship was captured and destroyed off the coast of Newfoundland by an American privateer.
Svyatoy Zotik (Святой Зотик, 'St. Zotikos')	Imperial Russian Navy	The cutter was wrecked near Bolsheretsk. Her crew were rescued. She was on a voyage from Kunashir (departed 11 September) to Petropavlovsk-Kamchatsky.
Thomas	United Kingdom	The ship was sunk by ice at St. John's, Newfoundland.
Three Frieds	United Kingdom	Napoleonic Wars: The ship was captured and destroyed by Andromaque, Ariane and Mameluke (all French Navy) between 21 February and 17 May. She was on a voyage from Saint Croix to Guadeloupe.
Traveller	United Kingdom	War of 1812: The ship was captured by USS President (United States Navy). She was set afire and sunk.
Unice	United States	The ship was driven ashore at Sandy Hook, New Jersey. She was on a voyage from New York to Porto.
United Kingdom	United Kingdom	Napoleonic Wars: The ship was captured by a French privateer off the Caicos Islands. She was set afire and sunk.
Washington	United States	The schooner was scuttled by her crew off Saint Lucia.
Seven unnamed vessels	Imperial Russian Navy	French invasion of Russia: Four gunboats ran aground at unspecified locations in the Baltic Sea and three were driven ashore at Naissaar or Aegna.
