= Dispatch (ship) =

Several vessels have borne the name Dispatch:

- Dispatch (1784 ship) was built in Bermuda and came to England possibly as early as 1786. In 1792 she made a voyage carrying slaves from Africa to the West indies. She was then briefly a privateer before returning to the slave trade. The French captured her in 1795 while she was on her third slave trading voyage.
- Dispatch (1795 ship) was an 18-gun, Albatross-class brig-sloop, intended for the British Royal Navy, but sold to the Imperial Russian Navy before commissioning. Between 1796 and 1805 she served in the North Sea and the Baltic Sea. She was wrecked in 1805.
- Dispatch Packet (1808 ship) was launched in France in 1807, probably under another name. She was taken in prize and from 1808 sailed from Falmouth, Cornwall as a packet for the Post Office Packet Service. She sailed primarily to the Iberian peninsula, but also made voyages to North America, Suriname, and the Mediterranean. She was wrecked on 14 April 1812 while returning to Falmouth from Malta.

== See also ==
- HMS Dispatch – any one of 16 vessels
- USS Despatch - any one of six vessels
