= Dispatch Packet (1808 ship) =

History

United Kingdom
- Builder: France
- Launched: 1807
- Acquired: 1808
- Fate: Wrecked 14 April 1812

General characteristics
- Tons burthen: 180 (bm)
- Armament: 10 × 6-pounder guns

Dispatch Packet (or Dispatch) was launched in France in 1807, probably under another name. She was taken in prize and from 1808 sailed from Falmouth, Cornwall, as a packet for the Post Office Packet Service. She sailed primarily to the Iberian peninsula, but also made voyages to North America, Suriname, and the Mediterranean. She was wrecked on 14 April 1812 while returning to Falmouth from Malta.

The following information is from Howat.

Captain	Date of appointment
John Harris	18 August 1808
Edward Vinscombe	10 January 1810
John Parsons	30 July 1810
William Kirkness	November 1810

== Fate ==
Dispatch was wrecked on a shoal between Malta and Mazara del Vallo, Trapani. All on board and the mails were rescued.

Captain Kirkness returned to England aboard the store ship HMS Abundance.
