= List of ship launches in 1829 =

The list of ship launches in 1829 includes a chronological list of some ships launched in 1829.

Date	Ship	Class	Builder	Location	Country	Notes
5 February	Royal Saxon	Barque	Wilson & Sons	Liverpool	United Kingdom	For D. Petrie & Co.
19 February	Eurotas	Cydnus-class frigate		Chatham Dockyard	United Kingdom	For Royal Navy.
5 March	Duke of Wellington	Steamship	J. Duffus & Co.	Aberdeen	United Kingdom	For private owner.
24 March	Kingston	Tug	Henry Smith & Co	Gainsborough	United Kingdom	For private owner.
March	Andromeda	Frigate		Bombay	India	For Royal Navy.
March	Bee	Steamship			United Kingdom	For private owner.
2 April	Tam O'Shanter	Barque	Robert Reay	North Hylton	United Kingdom	For Lindsey & Co.
20 April	President	Frigate		Portsmouth Dockyard	United Kingdom	For Royal Navy.
21 April	Favorite	Favorite-class ship-sloop		Portsmouth Dockyard	United Kingdom	For Royal Navy.
4 May	Science	Brig	Tindall	Scarborough	United Kingdom	For Mr. Tindall.
5 May	Créole	Créole-class Corvette		Cherbourg	France	For French Navy.
5 May	Pearl	Paddle steamer	Barnes & Miller	Ratcliffe	United Kingdom	For Gravesend and Milton Steam Boat Company.
6 May	Hyacinth	Favorite-class ship-sloop		Plymouth Dockyard	United Kingdom	For Royal Navy.
2 June	Larne	Comet-class sloop		Pembroke Dockyard	United Kingdom	For Royal Navy.
27 June	Kamchatka	Brig	S. O. Burachek	Astrakhan	Russia	For Imperial Russian Navy.
June	Lydia	Smack		Aberdeen	United Kingdom	For private owner.
1 July	Columbia	Paddle steamer		Woolwich Dockyard	United Kingdom	For Royal Navy.
2 July	Griffon	Cygne-class brig		Brest	France	For French Navy.
3 July	Briseis	Cherokee-class brig-sloop		Deptford Dockyard	United Kingdom	For Royal Navy.
1 August	Algerine	Cherokee-class brig-sloop		Deptford Dockyard	United Kingdom	For Royal Navy.
3 August	Sphinx	Sphinx-class aviso		Rochefort	France	For French Navy.
4 August	Thunder	Hecla-class bomb vessel		Deptford Dockyard	United Kingdom	For Royal Navy.
17 August	Fox	Leda-class frigate		Portsmouth Dockyard	United Kingdom	For Royal Navy.
17 August	Rapid	Cherokee-class brig-sloop		Portsmouth Dockyard	United Kingdom	For Royal Navy.
17 August	Recruit	Cherokee-class brig-sloop		Portsmouth Dockyard	United Kingdom	For Royal Navy.
26 August	Fanny	Barque	J. A. Currie	Sulkea	India	For private owner.
27 August	Suffren	Suffren-class ship of the line	Louis Jean Baptiste Bretocq	Cherbourg	France	For French Navy.
August	Belfast	Paddle steamer	John Wood & Co.	Port Glasgow	United Kingdom	For David Napier & John Gemmill.
15 September	Isabella	Merchantman	Straker & Co.	South Shields	United Kingdom	For private owner.
16 September	Joseph P. Dobree	Brig	Charles Connell & Sons	Belfast	United Kingdom	For John Martin & Co.
21 September	Brienne	Ship of the line		Okhta	Russia	For Imperial Russian Navy.
26 September	Ducouedic	Cygne-class brig		Toulon	France	For French Navy.
29 September	Reindeer	Cherokee-class brig-sloop		Plymouth Dockyard	United Kingdom	For Royal Navy.
September	Enterprise	Sloop		Ulverston	United Kingdom	For private owner.
September	Guerreiro	Pallas-class frigate		Venice	Austrian Empire	For Austrian Navy.
12 October	Partridge	Cherokee-class brig-sloop		Pembroke Dockyard	United Kingdom	For Royal Navy.
12 October	Thais	Cherokee-class brig-sloop		Pembroke Dockyard	United Kingdom	For Royal Navy.
13 October	Penelope	Leda-class frigate		Chatham Dockyard	United Kingdom	For Royal Navy.
14 October	Hugh Lindsay	Paddle steamer	India	Bombay Dockyard	United Kingdom	For British East India Company.
31 October	Raven	Lark-class cutter		Pembroke Dockyard	United Kingdom	For Royal Navy.
31 October	Starling	Lark-class cutter		Pembroke Dockyard	United Kingdom	For Royal Navy.
15 November	Al-Zafariyya	Fourth rate	Luigi Mancini	Livorno	Grand Duchy of Tuscany	For Egyptian Navy.
21 November	Commerce	Mersey flat	William Cross	Winsford	United Kingdom	For private owner.
27 November	Delight	Cherokee-class brig-sloop		Chatham Dockyard	United Kingdom	For Royal Navy.
November	Emerald	Full-rigged ship		Bristol	United Kingdom	For private owner.
10 December	Rolla	Cherokee-class brig-sloop		Plymouth Dockyard	United Kingdom	For Royal Navy.
26 December	George Green	East Indiaman	William Smith & Co	Newcastle upon Tyne	United Kingdom	For Wigram & Green.
Unknown date	Adelaide	Merchantman	William Gales	Sunderland	United Kingdom	For William Gales.
Unknown date	Agenoria	Merchantman	John & Philip Laing	Sunderland	United Kingdom	For private owner.
Unknown date	Armata	Merchantman	Philip Laing	Sunderland	United Kingdom	For Philip Laing.
Unknown date	Aurora	Brig	Alex Adamson & William Bell	Sunderland	United Kingdom	For Brown & Co.
Unknown date	Brothers	Snow		Sunderland	United Kingdom	For private owner.
Unknown date	Brunswick	Merchantman	Edward Gibson	Hull	United Kingdom	For Edward Gibson.
Unknown date	Caledonia	Barque	Thomas Symers	Coringa	India	For Thomas Symers.
Unknown date	Carlisle	Snow	Tiffin	Sunderland	United Kingdom	For private owner.
Unknown date	Constitution	Paddle steamer		Cincinnati, Ohio	United States	For Sloo & Byrne, and William Bryan.
Unknown date	Crescent	Merchantman		Hylton	United Kingdom	For Howden & Co.
Unknown date	Delos	Merchantman	J. & R. Bailey	Shoreham-by-Sea	United Kingdom	For private owner.
Unknown date	Dorothy	Merchantman	William Gales	Sunderland	United Kingdom	For Christopher Grey.
Unknown date	Echo	Sloop	John Ball Jr.	Salcombe	United Kingdom	For Mr. Bartlett.
Unknowndate	Endeavour	Paddle steamer	Maudslay & Field	Lambeth	United Kingdom	For private owner.
Unknown date	Essex	Paddle steamer	Barnes & Miller	Ratcliffe	United Kingdom	For Milton and Gravesend Steam Packet Co.
Unknown date	Euphemia	Schooner		Sunderland	United Kingdom	For private owner.
Unknown date	Gazelle	Merchantman	James Leithead	Sunderland	United Kingdom	For W. Robson.
Unknown date	Grange	Merchantman		Sunderland	United Kingdom	For private owenr.
Unknown date	Hannah Elizabeth	Schooner	Silas Greenman	Stonington, Connecticut	United States	For private owner.
Unknown date	Intrepid	Merchantman	Thomas Brodrick	Whitby	United Kingdom	For Beadle & Co.
Unknown date	James Johnson	snow (snow)		Sunderland	United Kingdom	For private owner.
Unknown date	Jason	Fourth rate		Rotterdam	Netherlands	For Royal Netherlands Navy.
Unknown date	Kent	Paddle steamer	Barnes & Miller	Ratcliffe	United Kingdom	For Milton and Gravesend Steam Packet Co.
Unknown date	Londonderry	Brig		Sunderland	United Kingdom	For Tanner & Co.
Unknown date	Majestic	Merchantman	Nichol, Reid & Co.	Aberdeen	United Kingdom	For J. Catto & Co.
Unknown date	Medina	Merchantman	James Leithead	Sunderland	United Kingdom	For Thos. Wilkinson & Co.
Unknown date	Medora	Merchantman	Philip Laing	Sunderland	United Kingdom	For Mr Henderson.
Unknown date	Miranda	West Indiaman		Liverpool	United Kingdom	For Quayle & Co.
Unknown date	Moore	Merchantman	Alex Adamso & William Bell	Sunderland	United Kingdom	For S. Moore.
Unknown date	Navus	Merchantman	J. Storey	Sunderland	United Kingdom	For private owner.
Unknown date	Olive Branch	Sloop	William Bonker & James Vivian	Salcombe	United Kingdom	For Richard Sherriff and others.
Unknown date	Palembang	Fourth rate		Dunkerque	France	For Royal Netherlands Navy.
Unknown date	Royal Sovereign	Barque		Whitby	United Kingdom	For private owner.
Unknown date	Royal Tiger	Schooner		Bombay	India	For British East India Company.
Unknown date	St Vincent	Full-rigged ship		London	United Kingdom	For Cruickshank & Co.
Unknown date	Stirling Castle	Brig		Miramichi	(United Kingdom of Great Britain and Ireland) Colony of New Brunswick	For Abrams & Co.
Unknown date	Susannah	Snow		Sunderland	United Kingdom	For private owner.
Unknown date	Thomas Gales	Snow	William Gales	Sunderland	United Kingdom	For R. Scurfield.
Unknown date	Tigris	Brig		Bombay	India	For British East India Company.
Unknown date	Vliegende Visch	Full-rigged ship		Rotterdam	Netherlands	For Royal Netherlands Navy.
Unknown date	Warren	Brig		Swansea, Massachusetts	United Kingdom	For private owner.
Unknown date	William Badger	Whaler	William Badger	Kittery, Maine	United States	For private owner.
Unknown date	Young	Merchantman	T. & W. Dixon	Sunderland	United Kingdom	For W. Dixon.
