= List of ship launches in 1820 =

The list of ship launches in 1820 includes a chronological list of some ships launched in 1820.

Date	Ship	Class	Builder	Location	Country	Notes
3 January	Coromandel	Merchantman	George Gooch	Rotherhithe	United Kingdom	For Scott& Co.
January	Helen Jane	East Indiaman	Wilson & Co.	Liverpool	United Kingdom	For Messrs. Gladstone & Co.
January	Huskisson	East Indiaman	Mottershead & Heyes	Liverpool	United Kingdom	For Messrs. Tobins & Co.
January	Packet	Merchantman	Mulby and Evans	Liverpool	United Kingdom	For Messrs. Kerslake & Co.
2 February	George the Fourth	Brig	J. & W. Quirk	Liverpool	United Kingdom	For private owner.
February	Albion	Brig	J Hepton	Sunderland	United Kingdom	For J. Hepton.
10 March	Belfast	Steamship	Ritchie and McLaine	Belfast	United Kingdom	For George Langtry.
16 March	Hawke	Black Prince-class ship of the line	Henry Canham	Woolwich Dockyard	United Kingdom	For Royal Navy.
24 March	Clyde	Merchantman	John Scott & Sons.	Greenock	United Kingdom	For John Scott & Sons.
March	Jesmond	Snow	W. & J. Pile	Sunderland	United Kingdom	For Mr. Anderson.
25 April	Unnamed	Brig	White	West Cowes	United Kingdom	For private owner.
April	John and William	Schooner			United States	For private owner.
1 May	Henry	Schooner		Emsworth	United Kingdom	For private owner.
3 May	Trinity Buoy Yacht	Yacht	White	West Cowes	United Kingdom	For private owner.
4 May	Gerkules	Ariadna-class corvette		Kazan	Russia	For Imperial Russian Navy.
5 May	Aiaks	Aiaks-class sloop	B. F. Stoke	Saint Petersburg	Russia	For Imperial Russian Navy.
5 May	Ida	Aiaks-class sloop	B. F. Stoke	Saint Petersburg	Russia	For Imperial Russian Navy.
7 May	Merkurii	Brig	I. Y. Osminin	Sevastopol	Russia	For Imperial Russian Navy.
11 May	Beagle	Cherokee-class brig-sloop		Woolwich Dockyard	United Kingdom	For Royal Navy.
13 May	Barracouta	Cherokee-class brig-sloop		Woolwich Dockyard	United Kingdom	For Royal Navy.
17 May	Béarnaise	Iris-class schooner		Bayonne	France	For French Navy.
24 May	Ganimed	Brig	A. I. Melikhov	Nicholaieff	Russia	For Imperial Russian Navy.
24 May	Nord Adler	Third rate	A. I. Melikhov	Nicholaieff	Russia	For Imperial Russian Navy.
30 May	Ohio	Third rate	Henry Eckford	Brooklyn Navy Yard	United States	For United States Navy.
30 May	Prince Regent	Royal yacht		Portsmouth Dockyard	United Kingdom	For George IV.
31 May	Hirondelle	Schooner		Bayonne	France	For French Navy.
31 May	Merkurii	Spechnyi-class frigate	A. M. Kurohkin	Arkhangelsk	Russia	For Imperial Russian Navy.
May	Albion	Brig	J. Hall	Sunderland	United Kingdom	For Hall & Co.
May	Industry	Schooner			United Kingdom	For private owner.
8 June	Ladoga	Sloop	Y. A. Kolodkin	Lodeynoye Pole	Russia	For Imperial Russian Navy.
10 June	Falcon	Cherokee-class brig-sloop		Pembroke Dockyard	United Kingdom	For Royal Navy.
10 June	Frolic	Cherokee-class brig-sloop		Pembroke Dockyard	United Kingdom	For Royal Navy.
13 June	Minerva	Leda-class frigate	Nicholas Diddams	Portsmouth	United Kingdom	For Royal Navy.
1 July	The Asia	Brig	James Tippett & Co.	Bristol	United Kingdom	For Mr. Scott.
11 July	John Watson	Schooner	Menzies	Leith	United Kingdom	For private owner.
11 July	Royal George	Merchantman	James Shepherd	Paull	United Kingdom	For Joseph Soames.
26 July	Jasper	Cherokee-class brig-sloop		Portsmouth Dockyard	United Kingdom	For Royal Navy.
26 July	Trafalgar	Second rate	George Parkin	Chatham Dockyard	United Kingdom	For Royal Navy.
27 July	David Walter	Brig		Carmarthen	United Kingdom	For private owner.
27 July	Villers	Brig	George Llewelling	Swansea	United Kingdom	For private owner.
28 July	Ariel	Cherokee-class brig-sloop		Deptford Dockyard	United Kingdom	For Royal Navy.
5 August	Jeanne d'Arc	Jeanne d'Arc-class frigate		Brest	France	For French Navy.
10 August	Venus	Leda-class frigate	William Stone	Deptford Dockyard	United Kingdom	For Royal Navy.
18 August	Melampus	Modified Leda-class frigate	Edward Churchill	Pembroke Dockyard	United Kingdom	For Royal Navy.
24 August	Britomart	Cherokee-class brig-sloop		Portsmouth	United Kingdom	For Royal Navy.
25 August	Jean Bart	Téméraire-class ship of the line		Lorient	France	For French Navy.
7 September	North Carolina	Ship of the line	William Doughty	Philadelphia Navy Yard	United States	For United States Navy.
16 September	Feliza	Full-rigged ship	Hilhouse & Co.	Wapping	United Kingdom	For private owner.
5 October	Sviatoi Lavrentii	Aiaks-class sloop	B. F. Stoke	Saint Petersburg	United Kingdom	For Imperial Russian Navy.
19 October	Hopewell	Sloop	William Patrick	Mirfield	United Kingdom	For private owner.
20 October	Britannia	Caledonia-class ship of the line		Devonport Dockyard	United Kingdom	For Royal Navy.
21 October	Delaware	North Carolina-class ship of the line		Norfolk Navy Yard	United Kingdom	For United States Navy.
21 October	Provornyi	Spechnyi-class frigate	B. F. Stoke	Saint Petersburg	Russia	For Imperial Russian Navy.
24 October	Wilberforce	East Indiaman	William Simons & Co.	Greenock	United Kingdom	For John Robertson.
October	Marquis of Salisbury	Packet ship	William Symons	Little Falmouth	United Kingdom	For Post Office Packet Service
2 November	Alligator	Schooner		Boston Navy Yard	United States	For United States Navy.
7 November	Henry Brougham	Sloop		Annan	United Kingdom	For Messrs. Nicholson & Co.
7 November	Southampton	Southampton-class frigate	William Stone	Deptford Dockyard	United Kingdom	For Royal Navy.
27 November	Niemen	Atholl-class corvette		Woolwich Dockyard	United Kingdom	For Royal Navy.
29 November	Atholl	Atholl-class corvette		Woolwich Dockyard	United Kingdom	For Royal Navy.
5 December	The Flotentia	East Indiaman	W. Smith & Co.	Newcastle upon Tyne	United Kingdom	For private owner.
6 December	Kent	East Indiaman	Wigram & Green	Blackwall	United Kingdom	For British East India Company.
7 December	Ranger	Atholl-class corvette		Woolwich Dockyard	United Kingdom	For Royal Navy.
Unknown date	Aaron Manby	Paddle steamer	Horseley Ironworks	Tipton & London	United Kingdom	For Aaron Manby.
Unknown date	Arend	Sixth rate		Dunkirk	France	For Royal Netherlands Navy.
Unknown date	Carley	Sloop		Sunderland	United Kingdom	For private owner.
Unknown date	Gata	Schooner		Baltimore, Maryland	United States	For private owner.
Unknown date	Helen	Merchantman		Sunderland	United Kingdom	For Mr. Ballantyne.
Unknown date	Henry	Sloop		Plymouth	United Kingdom	For H. Rowe.
Unknown date	Hinde	Merchantman		Sunderland	United Kingdom	For private owner.
Unknown date	Hive	Merchantman		Deptford	United Kingdom	For private owner.
Unknown date	Indefatigable	Packet boat		Newcastle upon Tyne	United Kingdom	For private owner.
Unknown date	Indian	Merchantman		Whitehaven	United Kingdom	For Woods & Co.
Unknown date	Johns	Snow	John M. & William Gales	Sunderland	United Kingdom	For John M. Gales.
Unknown date	Newby	Snow	John M. & William Gales	Sunderland	United Kingdom	For R. Scurfield.
Unknown date	Pauline	Snow	John M. & William Gales	Sunderland	United Kingdom	For John Grimshaw.
Unknown date	Peyk i Mesiret	Third rate		Constantinople	Ottoman Empire	For Ottoman Navy.
Unknown date	Porpoise	Schooner		Portsmouth Navy Yard	United States	For United States Navy.
Unknown date	Reaper	Brig	John M. & William Gales	Sunderland	United Kingdom	For John M. & William Gales.
Unknown date	Rising Star	Paddle steamer	Blent	Rotherhithe	United Kingdom	For Thomas Cochrane.
Unknown date	Sea Flower	Brig		Sunderland	United Kingdom	For B. robson.
Unknown date	Sericca	Brig	John M. & William Gales	Sunderland	United Kingdom	For William Nicholson.
Unknown date	Skylark	Cutter		Milford Haven	United Kingdom	For Board of Customs.
Unknown date	Tarragona	Merchantman	Tiffin	Sunderland	United Kingdom	For Mr. Tiffin.
Unknown date	Thisbe	Merchantman	Philip Laing	Sunderland	United Kingdom	For Philip Laing.
Unknown date	Uraniia	Malyi-class frigate		Saint Petersburg	Russia	For Imperial Russian Navy.
Unknown date	Vigilant	Schooner		Bombay	India	For British East India Company.
Unknown date	Vulcan	Snow	John M. & William Gales	Sunderland	United Kingdom	For Thomas Young.
