= HMS Forester (1832) =

Cherokee-class brig-sloop

History

United Kingdom
- Name: HMS Forester
- Ordered: 26 May 1826
- Builder: Chatham Dockyard
- Laid down: September 1930
- Launched: 28 August 1832
- Fate: Sold in 1843

General characteristics
- Class & type: Cherokee-class brig-sloop
- Tons burthen: 230 bm
- Length: 90 ft 4 in (27.5 m) (gundeck)
- Beam: 24 ft 8 in (7.5 m)
- Draught: 9 ft 11 in (3.0 m)
- Depth of hold: 11 ft (3.4 m)
- Propulsion: Sails
- Sail plan: Brig rig
- Complement: 52
- Armament: 10 muzzle-loading, smoothbore guns: 2 × 6 pdr guns; 8 × 18 pdr carronades

HMS Forester was a 10-gun Cherokee-class brig-sloop built for the Royal Navy during the 1830s.

== Description ==
The Cherokee-class brig-sloops were designed by Henry Peake, they were nicknamed 'coffin brigs' for the large number that either wrecked or foundered in service, but modern analysis has not revealed any obvious design faults. They were probably sailed beyond their capabilities by inexperienced captains tasked to perform arduous and risky duties. Whatever their faults, they were nimble; quick to change tack and, with a smaller crew, more economical to run. Forester displaced 297 long tons (302 t) and measured 90 feet 4 inches (27.5 m) long at the gundeck. She had a beam of 24 feet 8 inches (7.5 m), a depth of hold of 11 feet (3.4 m), a deep draught of 9 feet 11 inches (3.02 m) and a tonnage of 230 tons burthen. The ships had a complement of 52 men when fully manned, but only 33 as a packet ship. The armament of the Cherokee class consisted of ten muzzle-loading, smoothbore guns: eight 18 lb (8.2 kg) carronades and two 6 lb (2.7 kg) guns positioned in the bow for use as chase guns.

== Construction and career ==
Forester was ordered on 23 May 1826 and laid down in September 1830 at Chatham Dockyard. The ship was launched on 28 August 1832 and was fitted out as a brigantine with three guns on 2 January 1833. She was commissioned in October 1832 for service off the west coast of Africa.

On 14 February 1833, she ran aground on a reef off St Martin's, Isles of Scilly, with the loss of a crew member. She was later refloated and towed by the paddle sloop-of-war HMS Rhadamanthus to Plymouth, Devon, England, where she was paid off in ordinary.

== Bibliography ==
- Gardiner, Robert (2011). Warships of the Napoleonic Era: Design, Development and Deployment. Seaforth Publishing. ISBN 978-1-84832-108-3.
- Knight, Roger (2022). Convoys - Britain's Struggle Against Napoleonic Europe and America. Yale University Press. ISBN 978-0-3002-4697-1.
- Winfield, Rif (2014). British Warships in the Age of Sail 1817–1863: Design, Construction, Careers and Fates. Seaforth Publishing. ISBN 978-1-84832-169-4.
