= List of shipwrecks in April 1845 =

The following ships were sunk, foundered, wrecked, grounded, or otherwise lost during April 1845.

== 1 April ==
List of shipwrecks: 1 April 1845
Ship	State	Description
Hibernia	(United Kingdom of Great Britain and Ireland) British North America	The ship was wrecked on Long Island, Nova Scotia. She was on a voyage from Liverpool, Lancashire to Saint John, New Brunswick.
Triumph	United Kingdom	The ship was holed by ice in the Zuyder Zee and was beached at Enkhuizen, North Holland, Netherlands. She was on a voyage rom Amsterdam, North Holland to Newcastle upon Tyne, Northumberland.

== 2 April ==
List of shipwrecks: 2 April 1845
Ship	State	Description
Alley and Nancy	United Kingdom	The ship ran aground and was wrecked at Harrington, Cumberland. Her crew were rescued. She was on a voyage from Harrington to Douglas, Isle of Man.
Arab	United Kingdom	The ship ran aground at Llanelly, Glamorgan. She was on a voyage from Llanelly to Penzance, Cornwall. She was refloated the next day and resumed her voyage.
Cerere	Kingdom of the Two Sicilies	The barque was driven ashore near the entrance to Great Egg Harbor Bay. She was on a voyage from Gibraltar to New York, United States.
Corsair	United Kingdom	The ship was wrecked on Seal Island, Nova Scotia, British North America. She was on a voyage from London to Saint John, New Brunswick, British North America.
Josephine	United States	The ship ran aground in the Weser.
Lucy	United Kingdom	The ship was wrecked at "Moher", County Clare with the loss of all six of her crew. She was on a voyage from Limerick to Preston, Lancashire.

== 3 April ==
List of shipwrecks: 3 April 1845
Ship	State	Description
Cereri	Kingdom of the Two Sicilies	The barque was driven ashore in the Great Egg Harbour Inlet, New Jersey, United States. She was on a voyage from Gibraltar to New York, United States.

== 4 April ==
List of shipwrecks: 4 April 1845
Ship	State	Description
Heart of Oak	United Kingdom	The ship struck the Crow Rock, in the Irish Sea. She was taken in to Milford Haven, Pembrokeshire, where she sank. She was on a voyage from Cardigan to the Bristol Channel.
James White	United Kingdom	The ship was driven ashore on the cost of County Down. She was o a voyage from the Clyde to Saint John, New Brunswick, British North America. She was refloated.
Traveller	United Kingdom	The brig sprang a leak and foundered in the Atlantic Ocean. Her crew were rescued by Peruvian (United Kingdom). Traveller was on a voyage from Barbados to Africa.

== 5 April ==
List of shipwrecks: 5 April 1845
Ship	State	Description
Ann	United Kingdom	The ship was driven ashore at Plymouth, Devon. She was refloated and towed in to Plymouth.
Mermaid	United Kingdom	The steamship ran aground on the West Hoyle Bank, in Liverpool Bay and sank. All on board were rescued. She was on a voyage from Waterford to Liverpool, Lancashire.

== 6 April ==
List of shipwrecks: 6 April 1845
Ship	State	Description
Endymion	United Kingdom	The brig ran aground on the Gunfleet Sand, in the North Sea off the coast of Essex. She was on a voyage from London to Newcastle upon Tyne, Northumberland or vice versa. She was refloated the next day and taken in to Harwich, Essex in a leaky condition.

== 7 April ==
List of shipwrecks: 7 April 1845
Ship	State	Description
Catherine	Hamburg	The schooner was driven ashore at Helsingør, Denmark. She was refloated on 9 April and taken in to Helsingør.
Dantzic	Danzig	The barque was sighted in the Øresund whilst on a voyage from Newcastle upon Tyne, Northumberland, United Kingdom to Danzig. No further trace, presumed foundered in the Baltic Sea with the loss of all hands.
New Zealand	United Kingdom	The ship caught fire in the Irish Sea. She was on a voyage from Liverpool, Lancashire to Saint John, New Brunswick, British North America. She put in to Londonderry.
Peru	Prussia	The brig was holed by ice and sank in the Drogden. She was on a voyage from Hartlepool, County Durham, United Kingdom to Memel. She was refloated on 19 June and taken in to Kastrup, Denmark.
Swallow (1836)	United States	Swallow The steamboat was wrecked on the Brig Rock, in the Hudson River at Albany, New York with the loss of about 60 lives. There were 199 survivors, some of whom were rescued by the steamboats Express and Rochester (both United States). Swallow was on a voyage from Troy, New York to New York City.
Tay	United Kingdom	The ship was driven ashore near Kirkcaldy, Fife. She was refloated on 9 April and taken in to Dysart, Fife for repairs.

== 8 April ==
List of shipwrecks: 8 April 1845
Ship	State	Description
Britannia	(United Kingdom of Great Britain and Ireland) British North America	The brig was driven ashore at Nantucket, Massachusetts, United States. She was on a voyage from the Clyde to New York, United States. She was subsequently refloated and taken in to Nantucket for repairs.
Cottager	United Kingdom	The brig was wrecked in Saldanha Bay with the loss of two of her crew.
Heart of Oak	United Kingdom	The ship was driven ashore on Spurn Point, Yorkshire. She was on a voyage from Scarborough, Yorkshire to Hull, Yorkshire. She was refloated on 24 April and taken in to Hull.
Zenobia	United Kingdom	The schooner was in collision with the brig Alonzo (United Kingdom) and foundered in the North Sea off the coast of Yorkshire with the loss of a crew member. She was on a voyage from Hartlepool, County Durham to Plymouth, Devon.

== 9 April ==
List of shipwrecks: 9 April 1845
Ship	State	Description
Josephine	Norway	The ship was run down and sunk in the Atlantic Ocean by an English barque. Her crew were rescued by Lord Seaton (United Kingdom). Josephine was on a voyage from Christiansand to Barcelona, Spain.
Lord of the Isles	United Kingdom	The ship was driven ashore on Cape Fear, North Carolina, United States. She was on a voyage from Wilmington, Delaware, United States to Liverpool, Lancashire.
Zenobia	United Kingdom	The ship was in collision with Alonzo (United Kingdom and foundered in the North Sea off the coast of Yorkshire with the loss of a crew member. Survivors were rescued by Alonzo.

== 10 April ==
List of shipwrecks: 10 April 1845
Ship	State	Description
Annabella	United Kingdom	The ship was sunk by ice in the Atlantic Ocean, Her crew survived. She was on a voyage from Liverpool, Lancashire to Saint Johns, Newfoundland, British North America.
Eliezer	Portugal	The ship ran aground on The Skerries, Anglesey, United Kingdom. Her crew were rescued. She floated off and came ashore at Cemaes, Anglesey, where she was wrecked. She was on a voyage from São Miguel Island, Azores to Liverpool, Lancashire, United Kingdom.
England's Queen	United Kingdom	The ship was driven ashore at Cullercoats, Northumberland. She was on a voyage from South Shields, County Durham to Quebec City, British North America. She was refloated on 23 April and taken in to South Shields.
Favourite	United Kingdom	The ship was driven ashore near Hartlepool, County Durham. She was refloated on 23 April and taken in to Hartlepool.
Johanna	Russia	The ship was driven ashore near the Rammekens Castle, Zeeland, Netherlands. She was on a voyage from Antwerp, Belgium to London, United Kingdom. She was refloated on 24 April and taken in to Vlissingen, Zeeland.
Napier	United Kingdom	The ship struck the pier and sank at Whitby, Yorkshire. Her crew were rescued. She was on a voyage from Sunderland, County Durham to Bridlington, Yorkshire.
Pandora	United Kingdom	The ship capsized in the Atlantic Ocean. She was abandoned by her crew and subsequently foundered. She was on a voyage from Alexandria, Egypt to Halifax, Nova Scotia, British North America.
Sarah & Ann	United Kingdom	The schooner departed from South Shields, County Durham. No further trace, presumed foundered in the North Sea with the loss of all three crew.

== 11 April ==
List of shipwrecks: 11 April 1845
Ship	State	Description
Clio	United Kingdom	The ship was wrecked on Hunting Island, South Carolina, United States. Her crew were rescued. She was on a voyage from London to Savannah, Georgia, United States.
Johannes	Russia	The ship ran aground on the Goodwin Sands, Kent, United Kingdom. She was on a voyage from Vigo, Spain to Riga. She was refloated and resumed her voyage.
Nicolos	Kingdom of Hanover	The kuff ran aground on the Hubert Bank, off the coast of Groningen, Netherlands. Her crew were rescued. She was on a voyage from Greetzyl to London, United Kingdom.
Woodville	United Kingdom	The schooner ran aground on the Vogel Sand, in the North Sea. She was refloated on 16 April.

== 12 April ==
List of shipwrecks: 12 April 1845
Ship	State	Description
Clarence	United Kingdom	The ship ran aground and sank off "Sarby", Denmark. Her crew were rescued. She was on a voyage from "Holbeck" to an English port.

== 13 April ==
List of shipwrecks: 13 April 1845
Ship	State	Description
Maria Theresa	United Kingdom	The ship was in collision with Lord Seaton in the River Mersey and sank. Her crew were rescued. She was on a voyage from Liverpool, Lancashire to Senegal.

== 14 April ==
List of shipwrecks: 14 April 1845
Ship	State	Description
Clio	United Kingdom	The ship was wrecked on Hunting Island, South Carolina, United States. Her crew were rescued. She was on a voyage from London to Savannah, Georgia, United States.
Mary Ann	United Kingdom	The ship was driven ashore and wrecked south of Grimsby, Lincolnshire. She was on a voyage from Perth to London.
Mary Read	United Kingdom	The brig ran aground on the Herd Sand, in the North Sea off the coast of County Durham. She was refloated and was beached at South Shields. Her crew were rescued by a pilot boat. She was on avoyage from Aberdeen to South Shields.
Queen Victoria	United Kingdom	The ship sank in the River Avon. She was on a voyage from Bristol, Gloucestershire to Port Talbot, Glamorgan. She was refloated on 17 April.

== 15 April ==
List of shipwrecks: 15 April 1845
Ship	State	Description
Ebenezer	United Kingdom	The ship was driven ashore and wrecked at Herne Bay, Kent. Her crew were rescued. She was later repaired and returned to service.
Euphemia	United Kingdom	The ship ran aground in Flat Ledge Bay, Devon. She was on a voyage from "Dragomestre" to Exmouth, Devon. She was refloated.
Euterpe	United Kingdom	The barque was wrecked on the West Hoyle Sandbank, in Liverpool Bay with some loss of life. She was on a voyage from Saint Domingo to Liverpool, Lancashire. Euterpe was refloated on 17 April and beached at Seacombe, Cheshire.
Mary and Elizabeth	United Kingdom	The ship was driven ashore at Portland, Dorset. She was on a voyage from Plymouth, Devon to Weymouth, Dorset.
Nautilus	United Kingdom	The ship was driven ashore east of Leith, Lothian.
New Leeds	United Kingdom	The ship was driven ashore at Corton, Suffolk. Her crew were rescued. She was refloated on 24 April and taken in to Lowestoft, Suffolk.

== 16 April ==
List of shipwrecks: 16 April 1845
Ship	State	Description
Ariel	United Kingdom	The sloop was in collision with Quebec (United Kingdom) and foundered in the English Channel off the coast of Devon with the loss of all hands.
Francis	United Kingdom	The sloop was in collision with another sloop in the North Sea. She was beached at Grimsby, Lincolnshire. Her cargo of quicklime got wet and set the vessel on fire, severely damaging her.
Gipsey	United Kingdom	The ship was driven ashore near Blakeney, Norfolk. She was on a voyage from Hull, Norfolk to Wisbech, Cambridgeshire. She was refloated on 23 April and taken in to Cley-next-the-Sea, Norfolk.
Mary Honnsell	United Kingdom	The ship ran aground off Neuwerk. She was on a voyage from Dundee, Forfarshire to Hamburg. She was refloated.
Spreacombe	United Kingdom	The sloop was driven ashore and wrecked at Whiteshell Point, Glamorgan. Her five crew were rescued.

== 17 April ==
List of shipwrecks: April 1845
Ship	State	Description
HSwMS Aigle	Swedish Navy	The schooner of war was driven ashore at Gibraltar. She was refloated.
Jane	United Kingdom	The ship was driven ashore and wrecked at Thisted, Denmark. She was on a voyage from Montrose, Forfarshire to a Baltic port.
Fenerator	Hamburg	The barque ran aground on the Margate Sand, in the North Sea off the coast of Kent, United Kingdom. She was on a voyage from Hamburg to Port Republicain, Haiti. She was refloated and put in to Sheerness, Kent.
Isabella	United Kingdom	The ship ran aground on the Spaniard Sand, in the North Sea off the coast of Kent. She was on a voyage from Trieste to London. She was refloated and beached at Warden Point, Kent. Isabella was refloated on 18 April and towed in to Gravesend, Kent.
Jane	United Kingdom	The ship was driven ashore and wrecked at Thisted, Denmark. She was on a voyage from Montrose, Forfarshire to a Baltic port.
John	United Kingdom	The ship was driven ashore on Mainland, Orkney Islands.

== 18 April ==
List of shipwrecks: 18 April 1845
Ship	State	Description
Blonde	United Kingdom	The ship was driven ashore and damaged on Rathlin Island, County Donegal. She was on a voyage from Mobile, Alabama, United States to Greenock, Renfrewshire. She was refloated and taken in to Greenock with assistance from the paddle tug Defiance (United Kingdom).
Blucher	Hamburg	The ship was driven ashore at "Eisgenloch". She was on a voyage from Bahia, Brazil to Hamburg. She was refloated.
Elizabeth and Rebecca	(United Kingdom of Great Britain and Ireland) Van Diemen's Land	The whaler was driven ashore and wrecked at Point Gardiner, near Adelaide, South Australia with the loss of a crew member.
Frau Maria	Kingdom of Hanover	The ship was driven ashore between Spiekeroog and Wangeroog. She was on a voyage from Carolinensiel to Antwerp, Belgium. She was later refloated.
Industry	United Kingdom	The ship struck the Burrows Sand, in the North Sea off the coast of Suffolk and foundered. Her crew survived. She was on a voyage from Great Yarmouth, Norfolk to London.
Otto	Prussia	The brig was abandoned in the Atlantic Ocean. Her crew were rescued by Havre (France).

== 19 April ==
List of shipwrecks: 19 April 1845
Ship	State	Description
Freundin Elise	Netherlands	The ship ran aground on the Rood Sonnen Plaat, off the Vlie. She was on a voyage from Amsterdam, North Holland to Danzig. She was refloated on 24 April.
Palmyra	United Kingdom	The ship ran aground at the mouth of the Hooghly River. She was refloated and put back to Calcutta, India.
Scotia	United Kingdom	The ship ran aground at Hittarp, Sweden. She was on a voyage from Montrose, Forfarshire to Riga, Russia. She was refloated and put in to Helsingør, Denmark.

== 20 April ==
List of shipwrecks: 20 April 1845
Ship	State	Description
Henry	United Kingdom	The ship ran aground at Maryport, Cumberland. She was later refloated and resumed her voyage.
Milo	United Kingdom	The ship ran aground on the East Pole Sandbank, off the coast of Sussex.

== 22 April ==
List of shipwrecks: 22 April 1845
Ship	State	Description
Albertine	Netherlands	The ship was run aground on the Goodwin Sands, Kent, United Kingdom. She was on a voyage from Dordrecht, South Holland to Liverpool, Lancashire. She was refloated and resumed her voyage.
Apollo	Netherlands	The ship ran aground on the Goodwin Sands. She was on a voyage from Amsterdam, North Holland to Boston, Massachusetts, United States. She was refloated and anchored in The Downs.
Charlotte	United Kingdom	The ship ran aground on the Goodwin Sands. She was on a voyage from Hull, Yorkshire to Constantinople, Ottoman Empire. She was refloated and taken in to Ramsgate, Kent.
HMS Erebus	Royal Navy	Franklin's lost expedition: The Hecla-class bomb vessel became icebound in Baffin Bay and was abandoned. Ultimately, none of her crew survived.
Napoleon	France	The ship ran aground at Havre de Grâce, Seine-Inférieure. She was on a voyage from Havre de Grâce to Rio de Janeiro, Brazil and Buenos Aires, Argentina. She was refloated the next day and resumed her voyage.

== 23 April ==
List of shipwrecks: 23 April 1845
Ship	State	Description
Jessie	United Kingdom	The ship ran aground and capsized in the River Nene at Wisbech, Cambridgeshire.
Queen Adelaide	United Kingdom	The ship ran aground and sank in the River Nene.

== 24 April ==
List of shipwrecks: 24 April 1845
Ship	State	Description
Marquis of Camden	United Kingdom	The ship was driven ashore at Sheerness, Kent.
Mary	United Kingdom	The ship was driven ashore near North Somercotes, Lincolnshire. She was on a voyage from Rotterdam, South Holland, Netherlands to Hull, Yorkshire.

== 25 April ==
List of shipwrecks: 25 April 1845
Ship	State	Description
Anglicania	United Kingdom	The ship ran aground on Lark's Reef, in the Saint Lawrence River. She was later refloated.
Favourite	United Kingdom	The ship was driven ashore at Orlock Point, County Down. She was on a voyage from Tobermory, Isle of Mull to Liverpool, Lancashire. She was refloated on 28 April and taken in to Belfast, County Antrim.
John and Isabella	United Kingdom	The ship ran aground on the Barber Sand, in the North Sea off the coast of Norfolk. She was on a voyage from Cardiff, Glamorgan to Whitby, Yorkshire. She was refloated and resumed her voyage.
Martha	United Kingdom	The ship was in collision with Clutha (United Kingdom) in the North Sea off the coast of Essex. She was consequently beached on one of the offshore sandbanks. Martha was on a voyage from Harwich, Essex to London. She was refloated on 29 April and taken in to Wivenhoe, Essex.
HMS Skylark	Royal Navy	The Cherokee-class brig-sloop was driven ashore and wrecked at St Alban's Head, Dorset. Her crew survived.
Theodor	Kingdom of Hanover	The galiot was discovered derelict in the English Channel. She was beached near New Romney, Kent, United Kingdom.

== 26 April ==
List of shipwrecks: 26 April 1845
Ship	State	Description
Caroline	United Kingdom	The ship was driven ashore at Winterton-on-Sea, Norfolk. She was refloated and resumed her voyage.
Sarah	United Kingdom	The ship was driven ashore at Sheerness, Kent. She was on a voyage from Malta to London. She was refloated and sailed for the River Thames.
Shannon	United States	The barque was driven ashore at Beaumaris, Anglesey, United Kingdom. She was refloated.

== 27 April ==
List of shipwrecks: 27 April 1845
Ship	State	Description
Cleopatra	United Kingdom	The ship was driven ashore and wrecked at Ventry, County Kerry. Her crew were rescued. She was on a voyage from Sunderland, County Durham to Richibucto, New Brunswick, British North America.
Indus	United Kingdom	The brig was driven ashore at Redcar, Yorkshire. She was refloated and put in to the River Tees.
New Holland	United Kingdom	The ship was in collision with Southampton (United Kingdom) and was consequently run ashore at Margate, Kent. She was refloated on 28 April and taken in to Margate.
Shepherd	United Kingdom	The schooner was driven ashore at Redcar. She was refloated and put in to the River Tees.
Swallow	United Kingdom	The ship foundered off Portland, Dorset.

== 28 April ==
List of shipwrecks: 28 April 1845
Ship	State	Description
Catherine Ann	United Kingdom	The ship ran aground on Scroby Sands, Norfolk. She was refloated.
Sarah	United Kingdom	The ship was driven ashore at Sheerness, Kent. She was on a voyage from Malta to London. She was later refloated and resumed her voyage.

== 29 April ==
List of shipwrecks: 29 December 1845
Ship	State	Description
Eliza	United Kingdom	The ship struck a sunken anchor and sank at Blyth, Northumberland.
Jane	United Kingdom	The ship struck a sunken anchor and sank at Blyth.
Lady Raffles	United Kingdom	The ship was wrecked in Caernarvon Bay. Her crew were rescued. She was on a voyage from Sierra Leone to Liverpool, Lancashire. She was towed in to Holyhead, Anglesey on 26 May.
Norrbotten	Sweden	The brig was wrecked at Salcombe, Devon, United Kingdom. Her crew were rescued by the Coast Guard.

== 30 April ==
List of shipwrecks: 30 April 1845
Ship	State	Description
Bloom	United Kingdom	The schooner was run down and sunk in the North Sea 5 nautical miles (9.3 km) off Dimlington, Yorkshire with the loss of all hands.
General Chassé	Netherlands	The ship ran aground on the Taapaskeojic Rocks. She was on a voyage from "Patytan" to Batavia, Netherlands East Indies. She was refloated and towed in to Batavia by HNLMS Merapi (Royal Netherlands Navy).
Hannah	United Kingdom	The ship was wrecked on the African coast.
Providence	United Kingdom	The ship was driven ashore and wrecked at Clay Head, Isle of Man. Her crew were rescued.
St. Hans	Flag unknown	The ship was wrecked off the Riding Rock, in the Baltic Sea off the coast of Sweden. She was on a voyage from Messina, Sicily to Saint Petersburg, Russia.

== Unknown date ==
List of shipwrecks: Unknown date in April 1845
Ship	State	Description
Elizabeth Rebecca	(United Kingdom of Great Britain and Ireland) Van Diemen's Land	The whaler, a brig, was wrecked at Trial Harbour.
Eugenie	France	The ship was driven ashore on the Isle of Wight, United Kingdom. Her crew were rescued. She was on a voyage from Dunkirk, Nord to Málaga, Spain.
Gabrielle	France	The ship was wrecked in the River Plate before 6 April.
Isabella	United Kingdom	The barque sprang a leak and capsized in the Atlantic Ocean before 18 April. Her crew seventeen were rescued by the brig Trasmerano (Spain). Isabella was on a voyage from Aberdeen to Saint John, New Brunswick, British North America.
Nautilus	United Kingdom	The ship was driven ashore near Wells-next-the-Sea, Norfolk. She was refloated on 23 April and taken in to Cley-next-the Sea, Norfolk.
Psyche	United Kingdom	The ship was driven ashore on Mud Point, India between 1 and 19 April. She was on a voyage from Calcutta, India to London. She was refloated and put back to Calcutta in a leaky condition.
Susanna Ann	(United Kingdom of Great Britain and Ireland) New Zealand	The ship was wrecked in the Chatham Islands after 4 April. She was on a voyage from New Zealand to the Chatham Islands.
HMS Terror	Royal Navy	Franklin's lost expedition: The Vesuvius-class bomb vessel became icebound in Baffin Bay and was abandoned. Ultimately, none of her crew survived.
Tonintra	Hamburg	The ship was driven ashore at Équihen-Plage, Pas-de-Calais, France before 3 April. She was on a voyage from Lisbon, Portugal to Hamburg.
