= HMS Pigeon (1827) =

Brig-sloop of the Royal Navy

History

United Kingdom
- Name: Pigeon
- Ordered: 25 March 1823
- Builder: Pembroke Dockyard
- Laid down: May 1825
- Launched: 6 October 1827
- Completed: 23 February 1829
- Fate: Sold, 27 July 1847

General characteristics
- Class & type: Cherokee-class brig-sloop
- Tons burthen: 23510/94 bm
- Length: 90 ft (27.4 m) (gundeck)
- Beam: 24 ft 8 in (7.5 m)
- Draught: 9 ft 6 in (2.9 m)
- Depth of hold: 11 ft (3.4 m)
- Propulsion: Sails
- Sail plan: Brig rig
- Complement: 52
- Armament: 10 muzzle-loading, smoothbore guns: 2 × 6 pdr guns; 8 × 18 pdr carronades

HMS Pigeon was a 10-gun Cherokee-class brig-sloop built for the Royal Navy during the 1820s. She was sold in 1847.

== Description ==
The Cherokee-class brig-sloops were designed by Henry Peake, they were nicknamed 'coffin brigs' for the large number that either wrecked or foundered in service, but modern analysis has not revealed any obvious design faults. They were probably sailed beyond their capabilities by inexperienced captains tasked to perform arduous and risky duties. Whatever their faults, they were nimble; quick to change tack and, with a smaller crew, more economical to run. Pigeon displaced 297 long tons (302 t) and measured 90 feet 1 inch (27.5 m) long at the gundeck. She had a beam of 24 feet 8 inches (7.5 m), a depth of hold of 11 feet (3.4 m), a deep draught of 9 feet 10 inches (3.00 m) and a tonnage of 23519/94 tons burthen. The ships had a complement of 52 men when fully manned, but only 33 as a packet ship. The armament of the Cherokee class consisted of ten muzzle-loading, smoothbore guns: eight 18 lb (8.2 kg) carronades and two 6 lb (2.7 kg) guns positioned in the bow for use as chase guns.

== Construction and career ==
Pigeon was ordered on 23 March 1823 and laid down in October 1826 at Pembroke Dockyard with the name of Variable. The ship was launched on 6 October 1827, renamed Pigeon on 2 February 1829 and commissioned the following day. She was converted into a packet ship with four guns on 23 February and was assigned to the Falmouth packet service once she was completed. Pigeon was paid off on 31 May 1842 and sold on 27 July 1847.

== Bibliography ==
- Gardiner, Robert (2011). Warships of the Napoleonic Era: Design, Development and Deployment. Seaforth Publishing. ISBN 978-1-84832-108-3.
- Knight, Roger (2022). Convoys - Britain's Struggle Against Napoleonic Europe and America. Yale University Press. ISBN 978-0-3002-4697-1.
- Winfield, Rif (2014). British Warships in the Age of Sail 1817–1863: Design, Construction, Careers and Fates. Seaforth Publishing. ISBN 978-1-84832-169-4.
