= List of ship launches in 1821 =

The list of ship launches in 1821 includes a chronological list of some ships launched in 1821.

Date	Ship	Class	Builder	Location	Country	Notes
15 January	Clorinde	Fourth rate		Cherbourg	France	For French Navy.
19 January	Surprise	Steamship	James Lang	Dumbarton	United Kingdom	For private owner.
27 January	Ogle Castle	Merchantman	Thomas White	Cowes	United Kingdom	For Mr. Brown.
January	Terrys	Full-rigged ship	Fishburn & Brodrick	Witby	United Kingdom	For private owner.
16 February	Mountaineer	Steamship	R. & A. Carswell	Greenock	United Kingdom	For private owner.
3 March	Orfei	Brig	A. I. Melikhov	Nicholaieff	Russia	For Imperial Russian Navy.
29 March	Alligator	Atholl-class corvette	India	Cochin	United Kingdom	For Royal Navy.
4 April	Tourist	Steam yacht	James Brown	Perth	United Kingdom	For Leith and Aberdeen Steam Yacht Company.
7 April	City of Edinburgh	Paddle steamer	Wigram & Green	Blackwall	United Kingdom	For private owner.
19 April	Majestic	Steamship	John Scott & Co.	Greenock	United Kingdom	For Glasgow and Liverpool Steam Packet Company.
April	Lady Frances	Snow	John M. & William Gales	Sunderland	United Kingdom	For R. Scurfield & Co.
April	Macduff	Sloop		Macduff	United Kingdom	For private owner.
1 May	Velocity	Steam yacht	William Denny	Dumbarton	United Kingdom	For Aberdeen, Leith and Clyde Shipping Company.
2 May	Ellen Mar	Full-rigged ship	Humble and Hurry	Liverpool	United Kingdom	For private owner.
3 May	Hardware	Brig	Clarke and Dixon	Liverpool	United Kingdom	For private owner.
3 May	Pacific	Brig	James	Liverpool	United Kingdom	For private owner.
4 May	Eleanor	Merchantman		Sulkea	India	For private owner.
7 May	Apollon	Sloop	B. F. Stoke	Saint Petersburg	Russia	For Imperial Russian Navy.
7 May	Riga	Sloop	K. A. Glazyrin	Saint Petersburg	Russia	For Imperial Russian Navy.
8 May	James Cropper	Merchantman	Sidney Wright	New York	United States	For private owner.
15 May	Baku	Brig	A. P. Antipev	Kazan	Russia	For Imperial Russian Navy.
16 May	Muravei	Tender		Kazan	Russia	For Imperial Russian Navy.
17 May	Shark	Schooner		Washington Navy Yard	United States	For United States Navy.
18 May	Kreiser	Provornyi-class frigate	A. M. Kurochkin	Arkhangelsk	Russia	For Imperial Russian Navy.
18 May	Martin	Martin-class sloop		Portsmouth Dockyard	United Kingdom	For Royal Navy.
18 May	Sviatoi Andrei	Selafail-class ship of the line	A. M. Kurochkin	Arkhangelsk	Russia	For Imperial Russian Navy.
31 May	Lyonnaise	Iris-class schooner		Bayonne	France	For French Navy.
31 May	The Liverpool	Full-rigged ship	Cortney	Chester	United Kingdom	For private owner.
May	Hope	Schooner			United Kingdom	For private owner.
1 June	Lyra	Cherokee-class brig-sloop		Plymouth Dockyard	United Kingdom	For Royal Navy.
1 June	Rose	Sloop		Portsmouth Dockyard	United Kingdom	For Royal Navy.
2 June	Brilliant	Steam yacht	James Lang	Dumbarton	United Kingdom	For Leith and Aberdeen Steam Yacht Company.
9 June	Highland Lassy	Yacht	Richards	Hythe	United Kingdom	For General Mackenzie.
14 June	Provencale	Iris-class schooner		Bayonne	France	For French Navy.
16 June	Latona	Leda-class frigate	George Parkin	Chatham Dockyard	United Kingdom	For Royal Navy.
17 June	Queen Margaret	Steamship	Menzies & Son	Leith	United Kingdom	For private owner.
18 June	James Watt	Paddle steamer	J. Wood & Co.	Port Glasgow	United Kingdom	For London and Edinburgh Steam Packet Company.
20 June	Eclipse	Steamship	R. Steele & Son	Greenock	United Kingdom	For Napier & Langtry.
23 June	Dolphin	Schooner		Philadelphia Navy Yard	United States	For United States Navy.
25 June	Imperator Frants	First rate	A. I. Mekikhov	Kherson	Russia	For Imperial Russian Navy.
29 June	Lady Stanley	Steamship	Smith	Eastham	United Kingdom	For private owner.
30 June	Plover	Cherokee-class brig-sloop		Portsmouth Dockyard	United Kingdom	For Royal Navy.
June	Relief	Brig			United Kingdom	For private owner.
1 July	Amazone	Jeanne d'Arc-class frigate		Brest	France	For French Navy.
17 July	Edward Protheroe	Merchantman	Buckle and Davies	Chepstow	United Kingdom	For private owner.
20 July	Nereus	Modified Leda-class frigate		Pembroke Dockyard	United Kingdom	For Royal Navy.
31 July	Woodlark	Quail-class schooner		Deptford Dockyard	United Kingdom	For Royal Navy.
7 August	Sokol	Cutter	I. Y. Osminin	Sevastopol	Russia	For Imperial Russian Navy.
11 August	Alexander Nevskii	Provornyi-class frigate	B. F. Stoke	Saint Petersburg	Russia	For Imperial Russian Navy.
15 August	George the Fourth	Packet ship	Francis Symons	Falmouth	United Kingdom	For private owner.
27 August	Algiers	Frigate		Amsterdam	Netherlands	For Royal Netherlands Navy.
28 August	Pomone	Pomone-class corvette		Cherbourg	France	For French Navy.
29 August	Sovereign	Steam yacht	Sandon	Stourport-on-Severn	United Kingdom	For Captain Sandon.
August	Cecrops	Full-rigged ship	Philip Laing	Sunderland	United Kingdom	For Fletcher Bros.
August	Grampus	Schooner		Washington Navy Yard	United States	For Royal Navy.
11 September	Essex	Lifeboat		Harwich	United Kingdom	For Harwich Lifeboat Company.
13 September	Sir David Scott	East Indiaman	Jabez Bayley	Ipswich	United Kingdom	For British East India Company.
27 September	William Fairlie	East Indiaman	Jabez Bayley	Ipswich	United Kingdom	For British East India Company.
11 October	Berwickshire	East Indiaman	Charles David Gordon	Deptford	United Kingdom	For British East India Company.
12 October	Ferret	Cherokee-class brig-sloop		Portsmouth Dockyard	United Kingdom	For Royal Navy.
13 October	Macqueen	East Indiaman	Brindley	Frindsbury	United Kingdom	For British East India Company.
18 October	William Tell	Merchantman		New York	United States	For Samuel Hicks.
26 October	Reynard	Cherokee-class brig-sloop		Pembroke Dockyard	United Kingdom	For Royal Navy.
28 October	Okhtenka	Aiaks-class sloop	B. F. Stoke	Saint Petersburg	Russia	For Imperial Russian Navy.
30 October	Recovery	Merchantman	J. Thomas	Howrah	India	For private owner.
31 October	Calder	Brig	India	Calcutta	United Kingdom	For Barretto & Sons.
October	Storey	Schooner	W. Wake	Sunderland	United Kingdom	For private owner
2 November	Pospeshnyi	Fourth rate	A. I. Melikhov	Nicholaieff	Russia	For Imperial Russian Navy.
10 November	Duchess of Athol	East Indiaman	Money Wigram	Blackwall Yard	United Kingdom	For British East India Company.
10 November	Ganges	Canopus-class ship of the line	Jamsetjee Bomanjee Wadia	Bombay Dockyard	India	For Royal Navy.
14 November	Marchioness of Donegall	Steamship	Ritchie and Laine	Lough Neagh	United Kingdom	For private owner.
November	Erato	Merchantman	L. Crown	Sunderland	United Kingdom	For Blair & Co..
11 December	Nimrod	Merchantman	John Scott & Co.	Calcutta	India	For John Scott & Co.
11 December	Opossum	Cherokee-class brig-sloop		Sheerness Dockyard	United Kingdom	For Royal Navy.
22 December	Columbia	Merchantman		New York	United States	For private owner.
25 December	Florida	Merchantman	Smith, Blossom, and Denman	New York	United States	For private owner.
Unknown date	Aaron Manby	Paddle steamer	Aaron Manby	Tipton and Rotherhithe	United Kingdom	For Charles Napier.
Unknown date	Albany	Schooner	R. Spearman	Sunderland	United Kingdom	For private owner.
Unknown date	Bombay	Gunboat		Bombay	India	For British East India Company.
Unknown date	City of Kingston	Schooner			Unknown	For private owner.
Unknown date	Eagle	Paddle steamer	T. Brocklebank	Deptford	United Kingdom	For C. Bell, T. Brocklebank and others.
Unknown date	Florentia	Full-rigged ship		Newcastle upon Tyne	United Kingdom	For British East India Company.
Unknown date	Ford	Snow	John M. & William Gales	Sunderland	United Kingdom	For Thomas Allen.
Unknown date	Hastings	Frigate		Bombay	India	For British East India Company.
Unknown date	Hekla	Sixth rate		Rotterdam	Netherlands	For Royal Netherlands Navy.
Unknown date	Hero	Paddle steamer	J. Bankham	Frindsbury	United Kingdom	For W. Cawthorn, R. Cheeswright, J. Pearson & others.
Unknown date	Kemphaan	Full-rigged ship		Rotterdam	Netherlands	For Royal Netherlands Navy.
Unknown date	Lady Louisa	Snow	John M. & William Gales	Sunderland	United Kingdom	For John M. & William Gales.
Unknown date	Lightning	Paddle steamer	Elias Evans	Frindsbury	United Kingdom	For private owner.
Unknown date	Medusa	Paddle steamer	Elias Evans	Frindsbury	United Kingdom	For private owner.
Unknown date	Meteor	Paddle steamer	Elias Evans	Frindsbury	United Kingdom	For private owner.
Unknown date	Monkey	Paddle tug	Mr. Evans	Rotherhithe	United Kingdom	For Royal Navy.
Unknown date	Nepos	Merchantman	Philip Laing	Sunderland	United Kingdom	For Trader & Co.
Unknown date	Pellikaan	Full-rigged ship		Dunkirk	France	For Royal Netherlands Navy.
Unknown date	Phoenix	Whaler		Rochester, Massachusetts	United States	For private owner.
Unknown date	Prince Regent	Packet ship		Falmouth	United Kingdom	For Post Office Packet Service.
Unknown date	Proserpina	Sixth rate		Rotterdam	Netherlands	For Royal Netherlands Navy.
Unknown date	Rose	Brig	T. Burn	Sunderland	United Kingdom	For G. Hogg.
Unknown date	Sisters	Snow	John M. & William Gales	Sunderland	United Kingdom	For John M. & William Gales.
Unknown date	Susan	Merchantman		Southwick	United Kingdom	For private owner.
Unknown date	Sylph	brig	W. Adamson	Sunderland	United Kingdom	For W. Adamson.
Unknown date	Union	Paddle steamer	Elias Evans	Frindsbury	United Kingdom	For private owner.
Unknown date	Vasic	Snow	John M. & William Gales	Sunderland	United Kingdom	For R. Scurfield
Unknown date	Zeno	Merchantman	Philip Laing	Sunderland	United Kingdom	For Mr. Murray.
