= HMS Spey =

Eight ships of the Royal Navy have borne the name HMS Spey, after the River Spey, in Scotland:

- HMS Spey (1814) was a 20-gun sixth rate launched in 1814 and sold in 1822; she then was sold to the New Grenada Patriots of 1821 and became their naval brig Boyacá. She participated in the Battle of Lake Maracaibo, and in 1824 participated in the capture of numerous Spanish vessels, including the Spanish frigate Ceres. In 1826 she was reported to have been laid up.
- HMS Spey (1827) was a 10-gun Cherokee-class brig-sloop launched in 1827, converted to a 4-gun packet brig in 1833 and wrecked in 1840.
- HMS Spey (1856) was an Albacore-class wooden screw gunboat launched in 1856 and broken up in 1863.
- HMS Spey (1876) was a Medina-class iron screw gunboat launched in 1876 and sold in 1923.
- HMS Spey was a British P-class patrol boat launched in 1917 as HMS P38, renamed HMS Spey in 1925 and sold in 1938.
- HMS Spey (K246) was a River-class frigate launched in 1941 and sold to the Egyptian Navy in 1948 and renamed Rasheid. She remained in service with them until 1990.
- HMS Spey (M2013) was a River-class minesweeper launched in 1985 and sold to the Brazilian Navy in 1998 and renamed Pegasus, and then Bocaina.
- HMS Spey (P234) is a Batch 2 River-class patrol vessel launched in 2019.
