= HMS Wizard (1830) =

Cherokee-class brig-sloop

History

United Kingdom
- Name: Wizard
- Ordered: 28 October 1826
- Builder: Pembroke Dockyard
- Laid down: October 1829
- Launched: 24 May 1830
- Completed: 15 June 1837
- Commissioned: April 1837
- Fate: Wrecked, 8 February 1859

General characteristics
- Class & type: Cherokee-class brig-sloop
- Tons burthen: 2307/94 bm
- Length: 90 ft (27.4 m) (gundeck)
- Beam: 24 ft 8 in (7.5 m)
- Draught: 9 ft 2 in (2.8 m)
- Depth of hold: 11 ft (3.4 m)
- Propulsion: Sails
- Sail plan: Brig rig
- Complement: 52
- Armament: 10 muzzle-loading, smoothbore guns: 2 × 6 pdr guns; 8 × 18 pdr carronades

HMS Wizard was a 10-gun Cherokee-class brig-sloop built for the Royal Navy during the 1820s. She was wrecked in 1859.

== Description ==
The Cherokee-class brig-sloops were designed by Henry Peake, they were nicknamed 'coffin brigs' for the large number that either wrecked or foundered in service, but modern analysis has not revealed any obvious design faults. They were probably sailed beyond their capabilities by inexperienced captains tasked to perform arduous and risky duties. Whatever their faults, they were nimble; quick to change tack and, with a smaller crew, more economical to run. Wizard displaced 297 long tons (302 t) and measured 90 feet (27.4 m) long at the gundeck. She had a beam of 24 feet 8 inches (7.5 m), a depth of hold of 11 feet (3.4 m), a deep draught of 9 feet 2 inches (2.79 m) and a tonnage of 2317/94 tons burthen. The ships had a complement of 52 men when fully manned, but only 33 as a packet ship. The armament of the Cherokee class consisted of ten muzzle-loading, smoothbore guns: eight 18 lb (8.2 kg) carronades and two 6 lb (2.7 kg) guns positioned in the bow for use as chase guns.

== Construction and career ==
Wizard was ordered on 28 October 1826 and laid down in October 1829 at Pembroke Dockyard. The ship was launched on 24 May 1830 and was fitted out 15 June 1837 in ordinary. She was not commissioned until April 1837. On 29 May 1855, Wizard ran aground at Cork. She lay on her beam ends overnight and was refloated the next day.

On 8 February 1859, whilst acting as a tender to HMS Nile, Wizard was wrecked on the Seal Rock, in Bantry Bay. Her crew were rescued by HMS Skipjack.

== Bibliography ==
- Gardiner, Robert (2011). Warships of the Napoleonic Era: Design, Development and Deployment. Seaforth Publishing. ISBN 978-1-84832-108-3.
- Knight, Roger (2022). Convoys - Britain's Struggle Against Napoleonic Europe and America. Yale University Press. ISBN 978-0-3002-4697-1.
- Winfield, Rif (2014). British Warships in the Age of Sail 1817–1863: Design, Construction, Careers and Fates. Seaforth Publishing. ISBN 978-1-84832-169-4.
