= HMS Sheldrake (1825) =

UK naval brig and Post Office packet (1825–1855)

- Sheldrake entering Falmouth Harbour

History

United Kingdom
- Name: HMS Sheldrake
- Builder: Pembroke Dock
- Launched: 19 May 1825
- Fate: Sold for scrap, 1855

General characteristics
- Class & type: Cherokee-class brig-sloop
- Tons burthen: 22716/94 bm
- Length: 90 ft (27.4 m) (gundeck)
- Beam: 24 ft 9 in (7.5 m)
- Draught: 9 ft (2.7 m)
- Depth of hold: 11 ft (3.4 m)
- Propulsion: Sails
- Sail plan: Brig rig
- Complement: 52
- Armament: 10 muzzle-loading, smoothbore guns: 2 × 6 pdr guns; 8 × 18 pdr carronades

HMS Sheldrake was a 10-gun Cherokee-class brig-sloop built for the Royal Navy during the 1820s. In 1827 she became a Post Office Packet Service packet, sailing out of Falmouth, Cornwall.

== Description ==
The Cherokee-class brig-sloops were designed by Henry Peake, they were nicknamed 'coffin brigs' for the large number that either wrecked or foundered in service, but modern analysis has not revealed any obvious design faults. They were probably sailed beyond their capabilities by inexperienced captains tasked to perform arduous and risky duties. Whatever their faults, they were nimble; quick to change tack and, with a smaller crew, more economical to run. Sheldrake displaced 297 long tons (302 t) and measured 90 feet 1 inch (27.5 m) long at the gundeck. She had a beam of 24 feet 9 inches (7.5 m), a depth of hold of 11 feet (3.4 m), a deep draught of 9 feet (2.7 m) and a tonnage of 22756/94 tons burthen. The ships had a complement of 52 men when fully manned, but only 33 as a packet ship. The armament of the Cherokee class consisted of ten muzzle-loading, smoothbore guns: eight 18 lb (8.2 kg) carronades and two 6 lb (2.7 kg) guns positioned in the bow for use as chase guns.

== Construction and career ==
Sheldrake was ordered on 25 March 1823 and laid down in November at Pembroke Dockyard. The ship was launched on 19 May 1825 and was completed as a packet ship with four guns on 21 October 1826. She was commissioned in August 1826 and was assigned to the Falmouth packet service after her completion. Sheldrake was paid off on 28 June 1830, but was recommissioned for the same route on 9 April 1832.

== Bibliography ==
- Gardiner, Robert (2011). Warships of the Napoleonic Era: Design, Development and Deployment. Seaforth Publishing. ISBN 978-1-84832-108-3.
- Knight, Roger (2022). Convoys - Britain's Struggle Against Napoleonic Europe and America. Yale University Press. ISBN 978-0-3002-4697-1.
- Winfield, Rif (2014). British Warships in the Age of Sail 1817–1863: Design, Construction, Careers and Fates. Seaforth Publishing. ISBN 978-1-84832-169-4.
