= HMS Barracouta (1820) =

Brig-sloop of the Royal Navy

History

United Kingdom
- Name: Barracouta
- Ordered: 1817
- Builder: Woolwich Dockyard
- Laid down: 1818
- Launched: 1820

General characteristics
- Class & type: Cherokee-class brig-sloop
- Tons burthen: 23510/94 bm
- Length: 90 ft (27.4 m) (gundeck)
- Beam: 24 ft 8 in (7.5 m)
- Draught: 9 ft 6 in (2.9 m)
- Depth of hold: 11 ft (3.4 m)
- Propulsion: Sails
- Sail plan: Brig rig
- Complement: 52
- Armament: 10 muzzle-loading, smoothbore guns: 2 × 6 pdr guns; 8 × 18 pdr carronades

HMS Barracouta was a 10-gun Cherokee-class brig-sloop built for the Royal Navy during the 1810s. The ship was commissioned in 1822 as a survey ship. She helped to survey the eastern coastline of Africa during the 1820s. Barracouta was converted into a packet ship in 1828–1829 and was paid off in 1833. She was sold out of the service in 1836.

== Description ==
The Cherokee-class brig-sloops were designed by Henry Peake, they were nicknamed 'coffin brigs' for the large number that either wrecked or foundered in service, but modern analysis has not revealed any obvious design faults. They were probably sailed beyond their capabilities by inexperienced captains tasked to perform arduous and risky duties. Whatever their faults, they were nimble; quick to change tack and, with a smaller crew, more economical to run. Barracouta displaced 297 long tons (302 t) and measured 90 feet (27.4 m) long at the gundeck. She had a beam of 24 feet 8 inches (7.5 m), a depth of hold of 11 feet (3.4 m), a deep draught of 9 feet 6 inches (2.90 m) and a tonnage of 23510/94 tons burthen. The ship had a complement of 52 men when fully manned, but only 33 as packet ships. The armament of the Cherokee class consisted of ten muzzle-loading, smoothbore guns: eight 18 lb (8.2 kg) carronades and two 6 lb (2.7 kg) guns positioned in the bow for use as chase guns.

== Construction and career ==
Barracouta was ordered on 13 June 1817 and laid down in June 1818 at Woolwich Dockyard. The ship was launched on 13 May 1820 and was fitted out as a survey ship from September 1821 to 11 January 1822. She accompanied the sloop Leven on a mission to map Africa's eastern coastline. The expedition was led by British explorer and naval officer Vice Admiral William Fitzwilliam Owen. The master of the Barracouta was A. F. Morgan, whose name was used for Morgan Bay in the Eastern Cape, South Africa.

The ship was paid off upon her return to England on 19 September 1826 and began her conversion into a fast packet two years later. Barracouta was recommissioned on 30 May 1829 for the Falmouth packet service, paid off on 29 July 1833 at Plymouth and sold out of the service on 21 January 1836.

== Bibliography ==
- Gardiner, Robert (2011). Warships of the Napoleonic Era: Design, Development and Deployment. Seaforth Publishing. ISBN 978-1-84832-108-3.
- Knight, Roger (2022). Convoys - Britain's Struggle Against Napoleonic Europe and America. Yale University Press. ISBN 978-0-3002-4697-1.
- Winfield, Rif (2014). British Warships in the Age of Sail 1817–1863: Design, Construction, Careers and Fates. Seaforth Publishing. ISBN 978-1-84832-169-4.
