= HMS Falcon (1820) =

Brig-sloop of the Royal Navy

History

United Kingdom
- Name: Falcon
- Namesake: Falcon
- Ordered: 13 June 1817
- Builder: Pembroke Dockyard
- Laid down: May 1818
- Launched: 10 June 1820
- Completed: 3 August 1820
- Fate: Sold, 16 August 1838

General characteristics
- Class & type: Cherokee-class brig-sloop
- Tons burthen: 23510/94 bm
- Length: 90 ft 1 in (27.5 m) (gundeck)
- Beam: 24 ft 8 in (7.5 m)
- Draught: 9 ft 10 in (3.0 m)
- Depth of hold: 11 ft (3.4 m)
- Propulsion: Sails
- Sail plan: Brig rig
- Complement: 52
- Armament: 10 muzzle-loading, smoothbore guns: 2 × 6 pdr guns; 8 × 18 pdr carronades

HMS Falcon was a 10-gun Cherokee-class brig-sloop built for the Royal Navy during the 1810s. Completed in 1821, she was sold out of the service in 1838.

== Description ==
The Cherokee-class brig-sloops were designed by Henry Peake, they were nicknamed 'coffin brigs' for the large number that either wrecked or foundered in service, but modern analysis has not revealed any obvious design faults. They were probably sailed beyond their capabilities by inexperienced captains tasked to perform arduous and risky duties. Whatever their faults, they were nimble; quick to change tack and, with a smaller crew, more economical to run. Falcon displaced 297 long tons (302 t) and measured 90 feet 1 inch (27.5 m) long at the gundeck. She had a beam of 24 feet 8 inches (7.5 m), a depth of hold of 11 feet (3.4 m), a deep draught of 9 feet 10 inches (3.00 m) and a tonnage of 23519/94 tons burthen. The ships had a complement of 52 men when fully manned, but only 33 as a packet ship. The armament of the Cherokee class consisted of ten muzzle-loading, smoothbore guns: eight 18 lb (8.2 kg) carronades and two 6 lb (2.7 kg) guns positioned in the bow for use as chase guns.

== Construction and career ==
Falcon was ordered on 13 June 1817 and laid down in June 1818 at Pembroke Dockyard. The ship was launched on 10 June 1820 and was fitted out from 27 June to 3 August 1821. She was not commissioned until 1828 when she was assigned to the Cape of Good Hope and then to the West Indies. After an unsuccessful installation of a steam engine in 1833–1834, Falcon was sold for mercantile use on 16 August 1838 and renamed Waterwitch.

== Bibliography ==
- Gardiner, Robert (2011). Warships of the Napoleonic Era: Design, Development and Deployment. Seaforth Publishing. ISBN 978-1-84832-108-3.
- Knight, Roger (2022). Convoys - Britain's Struggle Against Napoleonic Europe and America. Yale University Press. ISBN 978-0-3002-4697-1.
- Phillips, Lawrie (2014). Pembroke Dockyard and the Old Navy: A Bicentennial History. Stroud, Gloucestershire, UK: The History Press. ISBN 978-0-7509-5214-9.
- Winfield, Rif (2014). British Warships in the Age of Sail 1817–1863: Design, Construction, Careers and Fates. Seaforth Publishing. ISBN 978-1-84832-169-4.
