= HMS Reynard (1821) =

Brig-sloop of the Royal Navy

History

United Kingdom
- Name: Reynard
- Ordered: 2 November 1818
- Builder: Pembroke Dockyard
- Laid down: May 1820
- Launched: 26 October 1821
- Completed: September 1823
- Commissioned: 18 December 1824
- Fate: Broken up, August 1857

General characteristics
- Class & type: Cherokee-class brig-sloop
- Tons burthen: 2377/94 bm
- Length: 90 ft 2 in (27.5 m) (gundeck)
- Beam: 24 ft 8 in (7.5 m)
- Draught: 9 ft 4 in (2.8 m)
- Depth of hold: 11 ft (3.4 m)
- Propulsion: Sails
- Sail plan: Brig rig
- Complement: 52
- Armament: 10 muzzle-loading, smoothbore guns: 2 × 6 pdr guns; 8 × 18 pdr carronades

HMS Reynard was a 10-gun Cherokee-class brig-sloop built for the Royal Navy during the 1820s. She was converted into a packet ship in 1829.

== Description ==
The Cherokee-class brig-sloops were designed by Henry Peake, they were nicknamed 'coffin brigs' for the large number that either wrecked or foundered in service, but modern analysis has not revealed any obvious design faults. They were probably sailed beyond their capabilities by inexperienced captains tasked to perform arduous and risky duties. Whatever their faults, they were nimble; quick to change tack and, with a smaller crew, more economical to run. Reynard displaced 297 long tons (302 t) and measured 90 feet 2 inches (27.5 m) long at the gundeck. She had a beam of 24 feet 8 inches (7.5 m), a depth of hold of 11 feet (3.4 m), a deep draught of 9 feet 4 inches (2.84 m) and a tonnage of 2377/94 tons burthen. The ships had a complement of 52 men when fully manned, but only 33 as a packet ship. The armament of the Cherokee class consisted of ten muzzle-loading, smoothbore guns: eight 18 lb (8.2 kg) carronades and two 6 lb (2.7 kg) guns positioned in the bow for use as chase guns.

== Construction and career ==
Reynard was ordered on 2 November 1818 and laid down in May 1820 at Pembroke Dockyard. The ship was launched on 26 October 1821 and was fitted out in November–December in ordinary. She was not commissioned until 18 December 1824. Reynard was converted into a packet ship in July–August 1829 and was assigned to the Falmouth packet service until she was paid off on 20 January 1837.

== Bibliography ==
- Gardiner, Robert (2011). Warships of the Napoleonic Era: Design, Development and Deployment. Seaforth Publishing. ISBN 978-1-84832-108-3.
- Knight, Roger (2022). Convoys - Britain's Struggle Against Napoleonic Europe and America. Yale University Press. ISBN 978-0-3002-4697-1.
- Winfield, Rif (2014). British Warships in the Age of Sail 1817–1863: Design, Construction, Careers and Fates. Seaforth Publishing. ISBN 978-1-84832-169-4.
