= HMS Zephyr (1823) =

10-gun Cherokee-class brig-sloop

History

United Kingdom
- Name: Zephyr
- Ordered: 2 November 1818
- Builder: Pembroke Dockyard
- Laid down: November 1821
- Launched: 1 November 1823
- Completed: 23 June 1824
- Fate: Sold 8 September 1838

General characteristics
- Class & type: Cherokee-class brig-sloop
- Tons burthen: 22834/94, or 233, or 235 (bm)
- Length: 90 ft (27.4 m) (gundeck); 71 ft 3 in (21.7 m) (keel)
- Beam: 24 ft 9 in (7.5 m)
- Draught: 8 ft 8 in (2.6 m)
- Depth: 11 ft (3.4 m)
- Sail plan: Brig
- Complement: RN:52; Packet:21
- Armament: RN:2 × 6-pounder guns + 8 × 18-pounder carronades; Packet:2 × 9-pounder guns

HMS Zephyr was a 10-gun Cherokee-class brig-sloop built for the Royal Navy and launched in 1823. She then became a Falmouth Post Office Packet Service packet. She was sold in 1836.

== Career ==
Zephyr first appeared in Lloyd's Register (LR) in 1824. She served in the packet service, which at that time was the responsibility of the Royal Navy.

Year	Master	Owner	Trade	Source
1824	Church (Note: Lieutenant Charles Church, Royal Navy.)	Admiralty	Falmouth packet	LR

On 19 July 1824 Zephyr sailed from Falmouth for New York. She was at Halifax, Nova Scotia between 16 and 19 August, and then New York between 24 August and 9 October. She was again at Halifax between 14 and 22 October. There she took on mail that HMS Argus had brought on 14 September. Zephyr returned to Falmouth on 6 November.

Zephyr sailed from Falmouth on 28 December 1825. She left Buenos Aires on 14 March 1826 and Montevideo on 20 March. She arrived back at Falmouth on 3 June.

Zephyr sailed from Falmouth on 23 July 1827. She was at Rio de Janeiro between 10 and 13 September. She left Buenos Aires on 16 October, Montevideo on 23 October, and Rio on 11 November. She arrived back at Falmouth on 27 December.

Zephyr sailed from Falmouth on 25 December 1828. She arrived at Rio on 10 February 1929, and Buenos Aires 27 February. She left Buenos Aires on 20 March and Montevideo on 25 March. She left Rio on 12 April and arrived back at Falmouth on 15 June.

Zephyr sailed from Falmouth on 23 November 1829. She left Buenos Aires on 5 February 1830 and Montevideo on 10 February. She arrived back at Falmouth on 30 April.

)n 24 September 1830 Zephyr sailed from Falmouth, bound for South America. She left Rio on 17 November, Buenos Aires on 17 December, and Montevideo on 29 December. She arrived at Rio again on 6 January 1831 with a broken mast. At Rio she transferred her mails to HMS Druid, which sailed for England on 16 January. Zephyr left Rio on 25 January and arrived back at Falmouth on 26 March. Druid had arrived at Portsmouth on 6 March.

On 9 July 1831 Zephyr sailed from Falmouth, bound for Bermuda. She arrived at Halifax on 7 August. She was at Bermuda between 27 September and 1 October. She was at Halifax again between 7 and 15 October, and arrived back at Falmouth on 2 November. In Halifax she picked up the mail that the mail boat Lady Ogle had brought from Boston on 7 October.

== Fate ==
Zephyr was paid-off on 23 May 1832, having been deemed defective; HMS Thais replaced Zephyr.

Zephyr was sold for £650 on 8 September 1836 to Mr. Greenwood, at Plymouth.
