= HMS Skylark (1826) =

UK naval big sloop and mail packet (1826–1845

History

United Kingdom
- Name: Skylark
- Namesake: Skylark
- Ordered: 25 March 1823
- Builder: Pembroke Dockyard
- Laid down: May 1825
- Launched: 6 May 1826
- Completed: 22 February 1827
- Fate: Wrecked, 25 April 1845

General characteristics
- Class & type: Cherokee-class brig-sloop
- Tons burthen: 23467/94 bm
- Length: 90 ft (27.4 m) (gundeck)
- Beam: 24 ft 11 in (7.6 m)
- Draught: 9 ft 6 in (2.9 m)
- Depth of hold: 11 ft (3.4 m)
- Propulsion: Sails
- Sail plan: Brig rig
- Complement: 52
- Armament: 10 muzzle-loading, smoothbore guns: 2 × 6 pdr guns; 8 × 18 pdr carronades

HMS Skylark was a 10-gun Cherokee-class brig-sloop built for the Royal Navy during the 1820s. She was wrecked in 1845.

== Description ==
The Cherokee-class brig-sloops were designed by Henry Peake, they were nicknamed 'coffin brigs' for the large number that either wrecked or foundered in service, but modern analysis has not revealed any obvious design faults. They were probably sailed beyond their capabilities by inexperienced captains tasked to perform arduous and risky duties. Whatever their faults, they were nimble; quick to change tack and, with a smaller crew, more economical to run. Skylark displaced 297 long tons (302 t) and measured 90 feet 1 inch (27.5 m) long at the gundeck. She had a beam of 24 feet 11 inches (7.6 m), a depth of hold of 11 feet (3.4 m), a deep draught of 9 feet 6 inches (2.9 m) and a tonnage of 23467/94 tons burthen. The ships had a complement of 52 men when fully manned, but only 33 as a packet ship. The armament of the Cherokee class consisted of ten muzzle-loading, smoothbore guns: eight 18 lb (8.2 kg) carronades and two 6 lb (2.7 kg) guns positioned in the bow for use as chase guns.

== Construction and career ==
Skylark was ordered on 25 March 1823 and laid down in May 1825 at Pembroke Dockyard. The ship was launched on 5 May 1826 and was converted into a packet ship with four guns from 2 June 1826 to 22 February 1827. She was commissioned in January 1827 and was assigned to the Falmouth packet service once she had been completed.

On 25 March 1842, Skylark was driven ashore at Greenock, Renfrewshire. She was refloated and taken into port. On 25 April 1845, Skylark was driven ashore and wrecked at St Alban's Head, Dorset. Her crew survived.

== Bibliography ==
- Gardiner, Robert (2011). Warships of the Napoleonic Era: Design, Development and Deployment. Seaforth Publishing. ISBN 978-1-84832-108-3.
- Knight, Roger (2022). Convoys - Britain's Struggle Against Napoleonic Europe and America. Yale University Press. ISBN 978-0-3002-4697-1.
- Winfield, Rif (2014). British Warships in the Age of Sail 1817–1863: Design, Construction, Careers and Fates. Seaforth Publishing. ISBN 978-1-84832-169-4.
