= HMS Spey (1827) =

Brig-sloop of the Royal Navy

History

United Kingdom
- Name: Spey
- Ordered: 25 March 1823
- Builder: Pembroke Dockyard
- Laid down: July 1825
- Launched: 6 October 1827
- Completed: 17 November 1828
- Fate: Wrecked, 28 November 1840

General characteristics
- Class & type: Cherokee-class brig-sloop
- Tons burthen: 23064/94 bm
- Length: 90 ft (27.4 m) (gundeck)
- Beam: 24 ft 8 in (7.5 m)
- Draught: 9 ft 6 in (2.9 m)
- Depth of hold: 11 ft (3.4 m)
- Propulsion: Sails
- Sail plan: Brig rig
- Complement: 52
- Armament: 10 muzzle-loading, smoothbore guns: 2 × 6 pdr guns; 8 × 18 pdr carronades

HMS Spey was a 10-gun Cherokee-class brig-sloop built for the Royal Navy during the 1820s. She was wrecked in 1840.

== Description ==
The Cherokee-class brig-sloops were designed by Henry Peake, they were nicknamed 'coffin brigs' for the large number that either wrecked or foundered in service, but modern analysis has not revealed any obvious design faults. They were probably sailed beyond their capabilities by inexperienced captains tasked to perform arduous and risky duties. Whatever their faults, they were nimble; quick to change tack and, with a smaller crew, more economical to run. Spey displaced 297 long tons (302 t) and measured 90 feet 1 inch (27.5 m) long at the gundeck. She had a beam of 24 feet 8 inches (7.5 m), a depth of hold of 11 feet (3.4 m), a deep draught of 9 feet 10 inches (3.00 m) and a tonnage of 23519/94 tons burthen. The ships had a complement of 52 men when fully manned, but only 33 as a packet ship. The armament of the Cherokee class consisted of ten muzzle-loading, smoothbore guns: eight 18 lb (8.2 kg) carronades and two 6 lb (2.7 kg) guns positioned in the bow for use as chase guns.

== Construction and career ==
Spey was ordered on 25 March 1823 and laid down on 6 October 1827 at Pembroke Dockyard. The ship was launched on 10 June 1827 and was converted into a packet ship with four guns from 15 October 1827 to 17 November 1828. She was commissioned in October 1828 and was assigned to the Falmouth packet service once she was completed.

Spey was wrecked on a reef in the Bahama Channel on 24 November 1840. All passengers and crew were rescued.

== Bibliography ==
- Gardiner, Robert (2011). Warships of the Napoleonic Era: Design, Development and Deployment. Seaforth Publishing. ISBN 978-1-84832-108-3.
- Knight, Roger (2022). Convoys - Britain's Struggle Against Napoleonic Europe and America. Yale University Press. ISBN 978-0-3002-4697-1.
- Winfield, Rif (2014). British Warships in the Age of Sail 1817–1863: Design, Construction, Careers and Fates. Seaforth Publishing. ISBN 978-1-84832-169-4.
