= HMS Partridge (1829) =

Cherokee-class brig-sloop built for the Royal Navy

History

United Kingdom
- Name: Partridge
- Namesake: Partridge
- Ordered: 28 October 1826
- Builder: Pembroke Dockyard
- Laid down: August 1828
- Launched: 12 October 1829
- Completed: 24 April 1836
- Fate: Sold, 2 February 1864

General characteristics
- Class & type: Cherokee-class brig-sloop
- Tons burthen: 23510/94 bm
- Length: 90 ft (27.4 m) (gundeck)
- Beam: 24 ft 8 in (7.5 m)
- Draught: 9 ft (2.7 m)
- Depth of hold: 11 ft (3.4 m)
- Propulsion: Sails
- Sail plan: Brig rig
- Complement: 52
- Armament: 10 muzzle-loading, smoothbore guns: 2 × 6 pdr guns; 8 × 18 pdr carronades

HMS Partridge was a 10-gun Cherokee-class brig-sloop built for the Royal Navy during the 1820s. She was sold in 1864.

== Description ==
The Cherokee-class brig-sloops were designed by Henry Peake, they were nicknamed 'coffin brigs' for the large number that either wrecked or foundered in service, but modern analysis has not revealed any obvious design faults. They were probably sailed beyond their capabilities by inexperienced captains tasked to perform arduous and risky duties. Whatever their faults, they were nimble; quick to change tack and, with a smaller crew, more economical to run. Partridge displaced 297 long tons (302 t) and measured 90 feet (27.4 m) long at the gundeck. She had a beam of 24 feet 8 inches (7.5 m), a depth of hold of 11 feet (3.4 m), a deep draught of 9 feet (2.7 m) and a tonnage of 23067/94 tons burthen. The ships had a complement of 52 men when fully manned, but only 33 as a packet ship. The armament of the Cherokee class consisted of ten muzzle-loading, smoothbore guns: eight 18 lb (8.2 kg) carronades and two 6 lb (2.7 kg) guns positioned in the bow for use as chase guns.

== Construction and career ==
Partridge was ordered on 28 October 1826 and laid down in August 1828 at Pembroke Dockyard. The ship was launched on 12 October 1829 and was fitted out as a tender from 24 April 1836. She was not commissioned until April 1836 when she was assigned to the flagship of the Commander-in-Chief, Plymouth. On 6 June 1838 the ship arrived in Helgoland and was used to deport Harro Harring to Britain. The ship was sold out of service on 2 February 1864.

== Bibliography ==
- Gardiner, Robert (2011). Warships of the Napoleonic Era: Design, Development and Deployment. Seaforth Publishing. ISBN 978-1-84832-108-3.
- Knight, Roger (2022). Convoys - Britain's Struggle Against Napoleonic Europe and America. Yale University Press. ISBN 978-0-3002-4697-1.
- Rüger, Jan (2017) Heligoland Britain, Germany and the Struggle for the North Sea Oxford University Press. ISBN 978-0-19-967246-2.
- Winfield, Rif (2014). British Warships in the Age of Sail 1817–1863: Design, Construction, Careers and Fates. Seaforth Publishing. ISBN 978-1-84832-169-4.
