= HMS Recruit (1829) =

Brig-sloop of the Royal Navy

History

United Kingdom
- Name: HMS Recruit
- Ordered: 25 March 1823
- Builder: HM Portsmouth Dockyard
- Laid down: February 1825
- Launched: 17 August 1829
- Fate: Foundered with loss of all hands in 1832

General characteristics
- Class & type: Cherokee-class brig-sloop
- Tons burthen: 23437/94 bm
- Length: 90 ft 1 in (27.5 m) (gundeck)
- Beam: 24 ft 9 in (7.5 m)
- Draught: 9 ft 6 in (2.9 m)
- Depth of hold: 11 ft (3.4 m)
- Propulsion: Sails
- Sail plan: Brig rig
- Complement: 52
- Armament: 10 muzzle-loading, smoothbore guns: 2 × 6 pdr guns; 8 × 18 pdr carronades

HMS Recruit was a 10-gun Cherokee-class brig-sloop built for the Royal Navy during the 1820s. Completed in 1831, she was lost with all hands in the North Atlantic the following year.

== Description ==
The Cherokee-class brig-sloops were designed by Henry Peake, they were nicknamed 'coffin brigs' for the large number that either wrecked or foundered in service, but modern analysis has not revealed any obvious design faults. They were probably sailed beyond their capabilities by inexperienced captains tasked to perform arduous and risky duties. Whatever their faults, they were nimble; quick to change tack and, with a smaller crew, more economical to run. Recruit displaced 297 long tons (302 t) and measured 90 feet 1 inch (27.5 m) long at the gundeck. She had a beam of 24 feet 9 inches (7.5 m), a depth of hold of 11 feet (3.4 m), a deep draught of 9 feet 10 inches (3.00 m) and a tonnage of 23137/94 tons burthen. The ships had a complement of 52 men when fully manned, but only 33 as a packet ship. The armament of the Cherokee class consisted of ten muzzle-loading, smoothbore guns: eight 18 lb (8.2 kg) carronades and two 6 lb (2.7 kg) guns positioned in the bow for use as chase guns.

== Construction and career ==
Recruit was ordered on 25 March 1823 and laid down in February 1825 at Portsmouth Dockyard. The ship was launched on 17 August 1829 and was fitted out from March to 18 August 1831. She was commissioned on 1 July 1831. On 29 May 1832, she sailed from Falmouth (or Bermuda – accounts differ), bound for Halifax, Nova Scotia (or Bermuda), under the command of Lieutenant Thomas Hodges, RN. She disappeared without trace, presumed foundered in the Atlantic Ocean with the death of all aboard.

== Bibliography ==
- Gardiner, Robert (2011). Warships of the Napoleonic Era: Design, Development and Deployment. Seaforth Publishing. ISBN 978-1-84832-108-3.
- Hepper, David J. (1994). British Warship Losses in the Age of Sail, 1650-1859. Rotherfield: Jean Boudriot. ISBN 0-948864-30-3. OCLC 622348295.
- Knight, Roger (2022). Convoys - Britain's Struggle Against Napoleonic Europe and America. Yale University Press. ISBN 978-0-3002-4697-1.
- Pawlyn, Tony (2003). The Falmouth Packets, 1689–1851. Truran. ISBN 9781850221753.
- Winfield, Rif (2014). British Warships in the Age of Sail 1817–1863: Design, Construction, Careers and Fates. Seaforth Publishing. ISBN 978-1-84832-169-4.
