= HMS Frolic (1820) =

Brig-sloop of the Royal Navy

History

United Kingdom
- Name: Frolic
- Ordered: 13 June 1817
- Builder: Pembroke Dockyard
- Laid down: August 1818
- Launched: 10 June 1820
- Completed: 3 August 1820
- Fate: Sold, 16 August 1838

General characteristics
- Class & type: Cherokee-class brig-sloop
- Tons burthen: 23678/94 bm
- Length: 90 ft 2 in (27.5 m) (gundeck)
- Beam: 24 ft 9 in (7.5 m)
- Draught: 9 ft 4 in (2.8 m)
- Depth of hold: 11 ft (3.4 m)
- Propulsion: Sails
- Sail plan: Brig rig
- Complement: 52
- Armament: 10 muzzle-loading, smoothbore guns: 2 × 6 pdr guns; 8 × 18 pdr carronades

HMS Frolic was a 10-gun Cherokee-class brig-sloop built for the Royal Navy during the 1810s. She was converted into a packet ship in 1823 and was sold in 1838.

== Description ==
The Cherokee-class brig-sloops were designed by Henry Peake, they were nicknamed 'coffin brigs' for the large number that either wrecked or foundered in service, but modern analysis has not revealed any obvious design faults. They were probably sailed beyond their capabilities by inexperienced captains tasked to perform arduous and risky duties. Whatever their faults, they were nimble; quick to change tack and, with a smaller crew, more economical to run. Frolic displaced 297 long tons (302 t) and measured 90 feet 1 inch (27.5 m) long at the gundeck. She had a beam of 24 feet 8 inches (7.5 m), a depth of hold of 11 feet (3.4 m), a deep draught of 9 feet 10 inches (3.00 m) and a tonnage of 23519/94 tons burthen. The ships had a complement of 52 men when fully manned, but only 33 as a packet ship. The armament of the Cherokee class consisted of ten muzzle-loading, smoothbore guns: eight 18 lb (8.2 kg) carronades and two 6 lb (2.7 kg) guns positioned in the bow for use as chase guns.

== Construction and career ==
Frolic was ordered on 13 June 1817 and laid down in June 1818 at Pembroke Dockyard. The ship was launched on 10 June 1820 and was fitted out from March to 3 August 1820 in ordinary at Plymouth Dockyard. She was converted into a packet ship from March to 15 June 1823 and commissioned the following month. Frolic was assigned to the Falmouth packet service until she was paid off on 25 November 1832. The ship was sold out of service on 16 August 1838.

== Bibliography ==
- Gardiner, Robert (2011). Warships of the Napoleonic Era: Design, Development and Deployment. Seaforth Publishing. ISBN 978-1-84832-108-3.
- Knight, Roger (2022). Convoys - Britain's Struggle Against Napoleonic Europe and America. Yale University Press. ISBN 978-0-3002-4697-1.
- Winfield, Rif (2014). British Warships in the Age of Sail 1817–1863: Design, Construction, Careers and Fates. Seaforth Publishing. ISBN 978-1-84832-169-4.
