= HMS Thais (1829) =

Brig-sloop of the Royal Navy

History

United Kingdom
- Name: Thais
- Ordered: 25 March 1823
- Builder: Pembroke Dockyard
- Laid down: July 1828
- Launched: 12 October 1829
- Completed: June 1832
- Fate: Lost, December 1833

General characteristics
- Class & type: Cherokee-class brig-sloop
- Tons burthen: 23064/94 bm
- Length: 90 ft (27.4 m) (gundeck)
- Beam: 24 ft 8 in (7.5 m)
- Draught: 9 ft (2.7 m)
- Depth of hold: 11 ft (3.4 m)
- Propulsion: Sails
- Sail plan: Brig rig
- Complement: 52
- Armament: 10 muzzle-loading, smoothbore guns: 2 × 6 pdr guns; 8 × 18 pdr carronades

HMS Thais was a ten-gun Cherokee-class brig-sloop launched in 1829. She immediately became a Post Office Packet Service packet, sailing from Falmouth. She was lost in 1833 with all hands.

== Description ==
The Cherokee-class brig-sloops were designed by Henry Peake, they were nicknamed 'coffin brigs' for the large number that either wrecked or foundered in service, but modern analysis has not revealed any obvious design faults. They were probably sailed beyond their capabilities by inexperienced captains tasked to perform arduous and risky duties. Whatever their faults, they were nimble; quick to change tack and, with a smaller crew, more economical to run. Thais displaced 297 long tons (302 t) and measured 90 feet (27.4 m) long at the gundeck. She had a beam of 24 feet 8 inches (7.5 m), a depth of hold of 11 feet (3.4 m), a deep draught of 9 feet (2.7 m) and a tonnage of 23064/94 tons burthen. The ships had a complement of 52 men when fully manned, but only 33 as a packet ship. The armament of the Cherokee class consisted of ten muzzle-loading, smoothbore guns: eight 18 lb (8.2 kg) carronades and two 6 lb (2.7 kg) guns positioned in the bow for use as chase guns.

== Construction and career ==
Thais was ordered on 25 March 1823 and laid down in June 1826 at Pembroke Dockyard. The ship was launched on 12 October 1829 and completed as a packet ship with six guns on 23 February 1832. She was commissioned on 25 May and was assigned to the Falmouth packet service.

Thais, Lieutenant Charles Church, sailed from Falmouth on 12 December 1833, bound for Halifax, Nova Scotia. She was last seen southwest of Ireland. In March and April 1834, her wreckage washed ashore at Galway, Ireland. It is presumed that she foundered soon after her last sighting. A letter by a Capt. King, presumably found in the wreckage, reported that by 24 December she was at 50°00′N 16°8′W, heading northward with the wind WNW.

== Bibliography ==
- Gardiner, Robert (2011). Warships of the Napoleonic Era: Design, Development and Deployment. Seaforth Publishing. ISBN 978-1-84832-108-3.
- Hepper, David J. (1994). British Warship Losses in the Age of Sail, 1650–1859. Rotherfield: Jean Boudriot. ISBN 0-948864-30-3.
- Knight, Roger (2022). Convoys - Britain's Struggle Against Napoleonic Europe and America. Yale University Press. ISBN 978-0-3002-4697-1.
- Pawlyn, Tony (2003). The Falmouth Packets, 1689–1851. Truran. ISBN 9781850221753.
- Winfield, Rif (2014). British Warships in the Age of Sail 1817–1863: Design, Construction, Careers and Fates. Seaforth Publishing. ISBN 978-1-84832-169-4.
