= HMS Parthian (1808) =

Brig-sloop of the Royal Navy

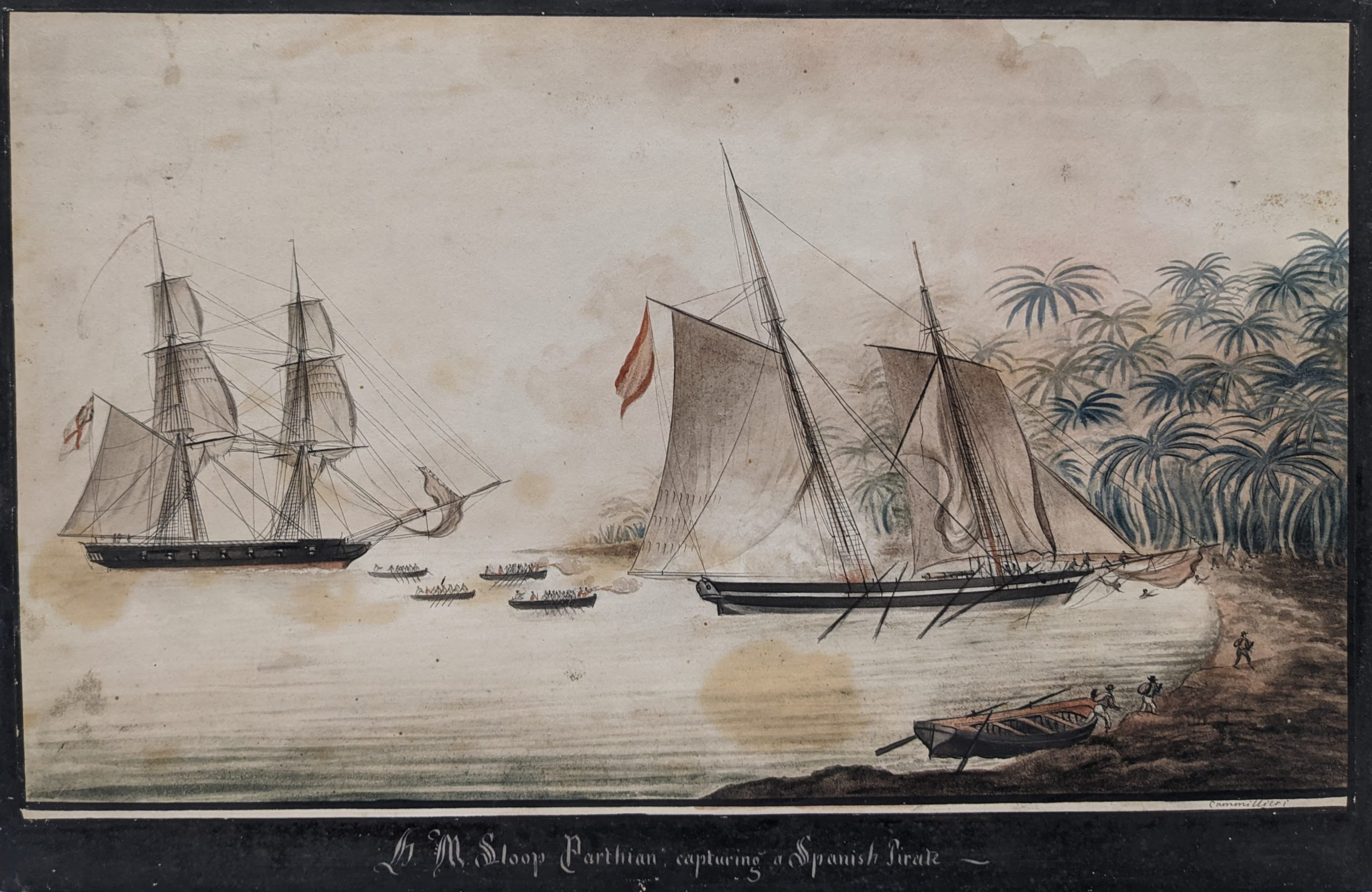
- Parthian (left) capturing a Spanish pirate ship

History

United Kingdom
- Name: HMS Parthian
- Namesake: Parthian Empire
- Ordered: 26 November 1807
- Builder: William Baranard, deptford, London
- Laid down: December 1807
- Launched: 13 February 1808
- Fate: Wrecked 15 May 1828

General characteristics
- Class & type: Cherokee-class brig-sloop
- Tons burthen: 238 14/94 bm
- Length: 90 ft 3 in (27.5 m) (gundeck); 74 ft 1 3/4 in (22.6 m) (keel)
- Beam: 24 ft 6 1/2 in (7.5 m)
- Depth of hold: 11 ft 0 in (3.4 m)
- Propulsion: Sails
- Complement: 75
- Armament: Gundeck: 8 × 18-pounder carronades; Fc: 2 × 6-pounder guns

HMS Parthian was a 10-gun Cherokee-class brig sloop of the Royal Navy launched at Deptford in 1808. During the Napoleonic Wars she captured one important French privateer, and several Danish, Dutch, and French merchantmen. After the war, Parthian captured a pirate schooner near Vera Cruz. Parthian was wrecked off Alexandria on 15 May 1828.

== Napoleonic Wars ==
Commander John Balderton commissioned Parthian in March 1808. On 5 November as Parthian was bringing dispatches back to England she encountered a corvette and three brigs in the Bay of Biscay at 48°N 11°W. Believing them to be English, Balderston sailed among them and signaled them to come too. As boats from the vessels approached Parthian, the men in them called out that they were French and that Parthian should surrender. Parthian exchanged fire with the French vessels and was able to out-sail them to escape. Balderston believed that one of the brigs was an English prize.

Captain Balderston was murdered on 12 December 1808. A master's mate, angry at being disrated, shot Captain Balderston as Parthian was getting under weigh from Plymouth for Cadiz. On 20 December the master's mate was tried for mutiny, found guilty, and sentenced to hang.

In 1809 Commander Richard Harward assumed command.

On 2 May 1809, Parthian was at 45°N 90°W when she sighted a brig to her west. The British recognized the brig as the famous privateer Nouvelle Gironde, and gave chase. After a 36-hour chase that involved the use of sweeps in the light winds, the British captured her. Nouvelle Gironde was armed with four 12-pounder and ten 4-pounder guns. She had a complement of 86 men (of whom 56 were on board), under the command of M. Lecomte. (Note: Nouvelle Gironde, of 120 tons (French; "of load"), had been commissioned in March 1808 at Bordeaux, under Alexis Marrauld. From November 1808, she was under a Captain Lecomte, with 10 officers and 66 to 70 men, and was armed with twelve 4-pounder guns and four 12-pounder carronades. Nouvelle Gironde was offered at auction in Plymouth on 11 July 1809. The advertisement gave her length as 76 ft 2 in (23.2 m), her breadth as 23 ft 2 in (7.1 m), her depth in the pump well as 10 ft (3.0 m), and her burthen as 17771/94.) She had been out 45 days. During her cruise Nouvelle Gironde had captured eight prizes. She arrived at Plymouth on 11 May. On 20 May Parthian sailed for Constantinople.

Commander Harward was promoted to post-captain on 31 July 1809.

In September 1809 Commander Henry Dawson assumed command on the Texel Station. Parthian took part in the ill-fated Walcheren Campaign. Commodore Owen placed Captain Dawson in charge of a division of gun boats covering the retreat of the rear guard during the evacuation in December. (The previous commander, Captain Abraham Lowe, had moved to take command of Sabrina.) Parthian was afterwards employed in the blockade of German rivers.

On 27 June 1810 Parthian assisted Die Bieni, at sea. The vessel's owners provided a reward.

In January 1810 Lloyd's List reported that Parthian had recaptured Thames, Greeve, master and sent her into Fowey. Thames had been returning to Liverpool from the Braziles when a French privateer had captured her.

Parthian captured the Dutch schuyts Vrou Belina, Drei Gesusters, Vrou Catharina, Julia, Argus, Drei Gebroeders, Wilhelmina, Goede Hope, Julia, Wedurve, and Wees on 21 April and 1 May 1810. Also, on 28 May Parthian recaptured Clyde.

Three of these may have been the three vessels laden with pitch, tar, rope, seed, and linseed that Parthian brought into Yarmouth on 11 May. The vessels had been sailing from Oldenburgh to Amsterdam when they were captured.

On 4 August 1810 Albertina, Brand, master, came into Hull. She had been sailing from Stettin when Parthian detained her. Captain Dawson received promotion to post-captain on 1 August 1811.

In August 1811 Commander James Tomlinson assumed command.

Parthian, Pincher, and Thrasher were in company on 22 and 25 October when they captured To Wenner, Esperance, and Jeune Remmer. A Danish vessel that was a prize to the three British ships stranded on Sandy Island. It was expected that part of her cargo of pitch, tar, oil, and fish would be saved.

On 29 December Parthian captured the Danish galiot Dorothea Elizabeth. Then on 31 December Parthian detained Gute Hoffnung.

Parthian was in company with Chanticleer when they captured the Prussian brig Jobb on 2 January 1812. Job arrived in Yarmouth.

On 1 February 1812 Parthian captured Anna Andrina. The next day she took goods out of a Danish vessel.

In February 1812 Commander James Garrety assumed command. War with America broke out in July 1812. On 1 August Parthian and the schooner Linnet captured the American brig Nancy. (Note: A first-class share of the prize money was worth £74 19s 9 1/2d; a sixth-class share, that of an ordinary seaman, was worth £1 6s 3 3/4d.) Nancy arrived in Portsmouth.

Parthian was laid up at Portsmouth in November 1813.

== Post-war career ==
Parthian underwent repair and refitting at Portsmouth between June 1817 and October 1818. Commander Wilson Biggland commissioned her in August 1818 for the Jamaica Station.

Commander Whitworth Lloyd recommissioned Parthian in August 1820 at Portsmouth, for Jamaica.

On 15 February 1823 Commander George Barrington was appointed to command Parthian at Plymouth and the Nore. Ship arrival and departure data show Parthian subsequently sailing between Plymouth or Falmouth and Lisbon or Cadiz with mails or a messenger.

In mid-1824 Parthian was in the Caribbean. In the first half of 1824, two British vessels, Pilgrim and Shannon, sailed from Campeachy, Mexico for Bristol and Cork, respectively. Neither arrived at their destination and were initially believed to have foundered in the Atlantic Ocean with the loss of all hands. However, pirates had captured both, murdered the crews, and burnt the vessels. Shannon was burnt in the Laguna de Términos and the pirates stuck her captain's head on a post on shore. The pirate vessel was a pilot schooner armed with one 8-pounder gun, with a crew of 36 men under the command of Juan el Valenciano, and owned by Sr. Molas of Yalafar

On 21 June Parthian arrived at Sacrificios from Falmouth. On 24 June she captured a pirate pilot schooner on the coast off Tobasco. Parthian took the schooner to Vera Cruz and there commissioned her to sail for the protection of the trade. On her the British found Pilgrim's letter bag, and a quantity of clothes, among them several shirts with Captain Watson's initials. They also found a pilot certificate for Pilgrim, Shannon's crewlist, a telescope inscribed "Peart" (the name of Shannon's master), and a quantity of English flags, sextants, and telescopes. In 1832 bounty money was paid for "the capture and destruction of a piratical vessel, name unknown". (Note: A first-class share was worth £51 15s; a sixth-class share was worth 14s 0 3/4d.)

A report dated Alvarado, Veracruz, 28 June, stated that Parthian had passed by Sacrificios and seen a number of vessels anchored there that had been taken by pirates. Because the waters were shallow and Parthian had no pilot, she did not go closer. She did capture a small pilot boat whose crew saved themselves by swimming ashore. A report dated Mexico, 30 June, stated that Parthian had captured a pirate schooner off Silsa. It was believed that the pirate vessel was the one that had taken the French brig Ancienne and put her captain and supercargo ashore 40 leagues from Alvarado. Parthian arrived at Plymouth on 13 September. She had sailed from Vera Cruz on 19 July, and Havana on 13 August.

On 3 January 1825 Parthian and six other men-of-war arrived at Falmouth from an "experimental cruise". In March she arrived at Portsmouth from Newfoundland. Commander Barrington received promotion to post-captain on 27 March 1826.

Between March and June 1826 Parthian was at Deptford, undergoing fitting for sea. Commander Henry Byam Martin commissioned her in March for the Mediterranean. (He had received promotion to the rank of Commander on 8 April 1825.) She sailed from Plymouth on 5 July, bound for the Mediterranean. She arrived at Malta on 2 August. Parthian sailed from Malta on 8 August 1826 with a convoy for Smyrna and the Dardanelles. She and HMS Seringapatam were in Smyrna on 19 September. On 19 October Parthian arrived in Trieste.

On 28 April 1827 Commander George Frederick Hotham replaced Commander Martin.

== Fate ==
Parthian was wrecked off Alexandria on 15 May 1828 while bringing dispatches. She was sailing along the coast at night when she grounded off shore. Her anchors failed and the sea pushed her on to the shore between Marabout (Marabut) Island and Arab's Tower. Cables enabled the entire crew to reach shore, where they established a camp. HMS Weazel arrived later that day and took the crew to Alexandria. The subsequent court martial blamed a strong southerly current that had carried Parthian further west than Captain Hotham and the sailing master had realized. The court martial board admonished them to be more careful in the future when sailing close to shore.
