= HMS Linnet (1806) =

History

United Kingdom
- Name: HMS Linnet
- Builder: Cowes
- Launched: 1797
- Captured: 25 February 1813

France
- Name: Linnet
- Acquired: 1813 by capture
- Fate: Sold 1813

United States
- Name: Bunkers Hill
- Acquired: 1813 By gift or sale
- Captured: March 1814

General characteristics
- Type: Cutter; later brig
- Displacement: 200
- Tons burthen: 196 70/94 (bm)
- Length: 77 ft 9 1/2 in (23.7 m) (overall); 57 ft 7 5/8 in (17.6 m) (keel)
- Beam: 25 ft 4 in (7.7 m)
- Depth of hold: 10 ft 9 in (3.3 m)
- Propulsion: Sails
- Complement: British service:60; French service:75; Privateer:86
- Armament: British service:2 × 6-pounder bow guns + 12 × 18-pounder carronades; French service: 2 × 6-pounder guns + 12 × 16-pounder carronades; Privateer:14 guns

HMS Linnet was originally His Majesty's revenue cutter Speedwell, launched in 1797, that the Royal Navy purchased in 1806. Linnet captured a number of privateers before the French frigate Gloire captured her in 1813. The French sold or transferred her to the Americans, who operated her as the privateer Bunkers Hill. In March 1814 the British recaptured her, but did not return her to service.

== Customs service ==
Speedwell was one of four revenue cutters present when the boats of a squadron under the command of Sir John Borlase Warren cut out the French privateer Guëppe on 30 August 1800. (Note: A first-class share of the prize money was worth £ 42 19s 6 1/2d; a fifth-class share, that of a seaman, was worth 1s 9 1/2d.)

== Royal Navy service ==
Having purchased Speedwell and having renamed her Linnet, the Royal Navy commissioned her in December 1806 under Lieutenant Joseph Beckett. In 1807 Lieutenant John Tracey (or Treacy, or Treacey, or Tracy) transferred from the hired armed cutter Princess Augusta to replace Beckett. On 29 July, Tracey was captain of Linnet when she and Decade captured the French sloop Victor.

Puissant and the "armed cutter" Linnet shared in the detention on 27 August of the Danish ship Deodaris. At the time, Puissant was an unarmed third rate serving as a receiving ship in the harbor at Portsmouth. That same day Linnet was in company with the cutter Sprightly when they captured Kron Prinz Frederick.

On 4 November, Linnet detained the galiot Wilhelmina, Willem Elderts, master. Wilhelmina, Eddarts, master, had been sailing from Petersburg. Linnet sent her into Portsmouth. About a month later a Wilhelmina, carrying cordage and timber, and detained by the Linnet, also arrived at Portsmouth.

On 16 January 1808, Linnet was some six or seven leagues from Cape Barfleur when she saw a French lugger pursuing two British vessels, a ship and a brig. Linnet joined up with the British vessels and towards night was able to close with the lugger. After an engagement of a little over two hours, the French lugger was in a sinking state and so struck. She was the privateer Courier, of 18 guns. She had a complement of 60 men under the command of Captain Alexander Black, and had lost her second captain killed and three men wounded. (Linnet had no loses.) Courier had been out four days and had been sheltering from a gale at the Îles Saint-Marcouf. She had not captured anything before herself being captured. However, earlier that day Courier apparently unsuccessfully engaged for two hours the merchant vessel Tagus, Connolly, master, which had been sailing from Monte Video and Cork.

In March Linnet captured two French fishing vessels. The first was the Aimable Henriette (26 March) and the second was the Marie Alexandre.

Linnet was in company with Boadicea and Solebay and so shared in the salvage for the recapture on 10 August of the Pappenbourg galiot Young Hariot. Later that month, on 30 August, Linnet captured the French privateer lugger Foudroyant off Cherbourg. Foudroyant was out of Saint Malo and had been armed with ten 6-pounder guns, six of which she had thrown overboard during the chase. She had a complement of 25 men, under the command of Michael Pierre Gamier, but only 15 or 18 were on board. Linnet sent Foudroyant into Portsmouth.

On 30 October, Linnet recaptured the Harmony, Watson, master, which had been sailing from Oporto to London with wine. A little over two weeks later, on 16 November, Linnet and Port Mahon worked together to capture the privateer General Paris, of Calais. General Paris was armed with three guns and had a crew of 38 men under the command of Mons. T. Sauville. She was three days out of Havre but had not taken any prizes.

Linnet is listed as one of the many vessels that took part in the ill-fated Walcheren Campaign between 30 July and 18 August 1809.

In December 1810 Linnet recaptured the ship John, of Newcastle. John, Bertie, master, had been sailing from Newcastle to Jamaica when the French captured her on 9 December off the Owers. Linnet sent John into Portsmouth.

On 29 May 1812, Linnet took the privateer Petit Charles off Start Point, by Start Bay. The privateer had a crew of 26 men, armed with small arms. She was four days out of Roscoff and had not captured anything. Prize money was paid some two to three years later. (Note: A first-class share was worth £25 5s 0d; a sixth-class share, that of an ordinary seaman, was worth 14s 6d.) Linnet brought Petit Charles into Portsmouth on 32 May; the report of her arrival refers to her as carrying two guns.

When news of the outbreak of the War of 1812 reached Britain, the Royal Navy seized all American vessels then in British ports. Linnet was among the Royal Navy vessels then lying at Spithead or Portsmouth and so entitled to share in the grant for the American ships Belleville, Janus, Aeos, Ganges and Leonidas seized there on 31 July 1812. (Note: A first-class share was worth £20 19s 0d; a sixth-class share was worth 4s 1d; the Commander in Chief received £230 10s 8d.) A few days later, Linnet and the sloop Parthian captured the American brig Nancy. (Note: A first-class share of the prize money was worth £74 19s 9 1/2d; a sixth-class share was worth £1 6s 3 3/4d.)

== Capture and fate ==
Linnet was sailing in the western approaches to the Channel on 25 February 1813 in high winds and heavy seas. She sighted a large vessel that proceeded to give chase, and did not identify itself. By 1430 hours, the frigate had gotten close enough to Linnet to identify herself as the Gloire, and to call on Lieutenant John Tracey to surrender. Instead, Tracey managed by adroit sailing to hold off his attacker for over an hour until shots from Gloire did sufficient damage to Linnet's rigging forcing Tracy to surrender. The court martial of Lieutenant Tracy on 31 May 1814 for the loss of his vessel acquitted him, noting his seamanship, courage, judgment, and his attempt to disable the enemy vessel. The Navy subsequently promoted Tracey to the rank of commander.

Gloire took Linnet into Brest, arriving on 27 February. The French transferred or sold Linnet to American owners who sailed her as the privateer Bunkers Hill or Bunker Hill. In August she was under the command of Captain Jacob Lewis when she sent into Chatham a British brig that had been carrying rum from Jamaica to Halifax. Then on 18 August the British brig James arrived in Boston. She had been sailing from Halifax when Bunker Hill had captured her. On 29 August there arrived in New York a British brig that had been sailing from Quebec to Bermuda when she had fallen prey to Bunker Hill.

On 4 March 1814, Pomone and Cydnus, were sailing on the east coast when they captured Bunker's Hill. She carried 14 guns and had a crew of 86 men. Previously very successful, she had been cruising for eight days out of Morlaix without having made a single capture. (Note: The prize money for an ordinary seaman was 16s 6 3/4d.) The Navy did not take her back into service.
