= HMS Rapid =

Nine ships of the Royal Navy have borne the name HMS Rapid:

- HMS Rapid (1804) was a 12-gun gun-brig launched in 1804 and sunk in 1808.
- HMS Rapide (1808 schooner) was a British schooner that the French captured in 1806, named Villaret and renamed Rapide, that the British recaptured in 1808 and employed as a ship's tender, and that was wrecked in 1814.
- HMS Rapid (1808 brig-sloop) was a 14-gun brig-sloop launched in 1808 and sold in 1814.
- HMS Rapid (1829) was a 10-gun Cherokee-class brig-sloop launched in 1829 and wrecked in 1838.
- HMS Rapid (1840) was an 8-gun brig launched in 1840 and sold in 1856.
- HMS Rapid (1860) was a wooden Rosario-class screw sloop launched in 1860 and broken up in 1881.
- HMS Rapid (1883) was a Satellite-class composite screw corvette launched in 1883. She was hulked in 1906, used as a coal hulk named C7 from 1912. She was converted to an accommodation hulk and renamed HMS Hart in 1916. She was sold in 1948.
- HMS Rapid (1916) was an Thornycroft M-class destroyer launched in 1916 and sold in 1927.
- HMS Rapid (H32) was an R-class destroyer launched in 1942. She was converted into a frigate in 1952 and was sunk as a target in 1981.

== See also ==
- The name was also given to a British Rail Class 42 locomotive of the Warship class.
