= Cherokee-class brig-sloop =

1807 class of British sloops-of-war

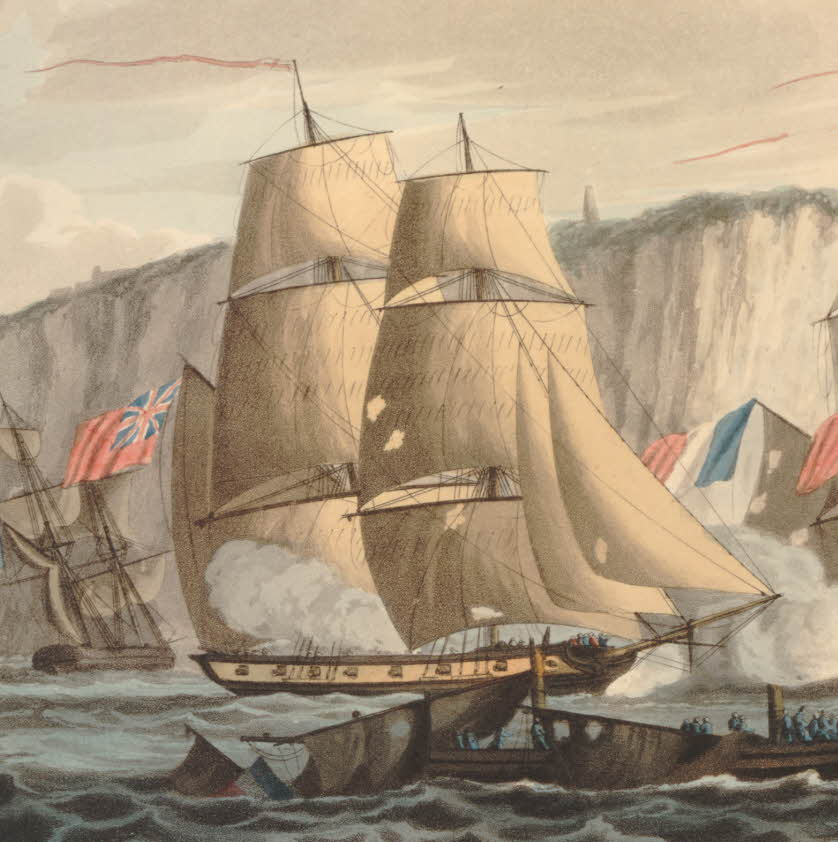
- HMS Rosario in 1812

Class overview
- Name: Cherokee-class brig-sloop
- Operators: Royal Navy
- Planned: 115
- Completed: 36 in first batch; 34 in second batch (with another 1 being cancelled); 34 in third batch (with another 4 cancelled and 6 orders replaced by orders for equivalent steam-assisted paddle vessels)
- Canceled: 11

General characteristics
- Type: Brig-sloop
- Tons burthen: 238 bm
- Length: Overall: 90 ft 0 in (27.43 m); Keel: 73 ft 7 5/8 in (22.4 m)
- Beam: 24 ft 6 in (7.47 m)
- Draught: 12 ft 6 in (3.8 m)
- Depth of hold: 11 ft 0 in (3.4 m)
- Propulsion: Sails
- Complement: Sloop-of-war:75; Survey voyages: On Beagle's second voyage, 65 plus 9 supernumeraries
- Armament: Sloop-of-war:2 × 6-pounder bow chasers + 8 × 18-pounder carronades; Survey voyages:6 guns

The Cherokee class was a class of brig-sloops of the Royal Navy, mounting ten guns. Brig-sloops were sloops-of-war with two masts (a fore mast and a taller main mast) rather than the three masts of ship sloops. Orders for 115 vessels were placed, including five which were cancelled and six for which the orders were replaced by ones for equivalent steam-powered paddle vessels.

Many of these sailing vessels served as mail packet ships, and more than eight assisted with exploration and surveys. The best known of the class was HMS Beagle, then considerably modified for Beagle's second survey voyage under Robert FitzRoy, with the gentleman naturalist Charles Darwin on board as a self-funded supernumerary.

== Design ==
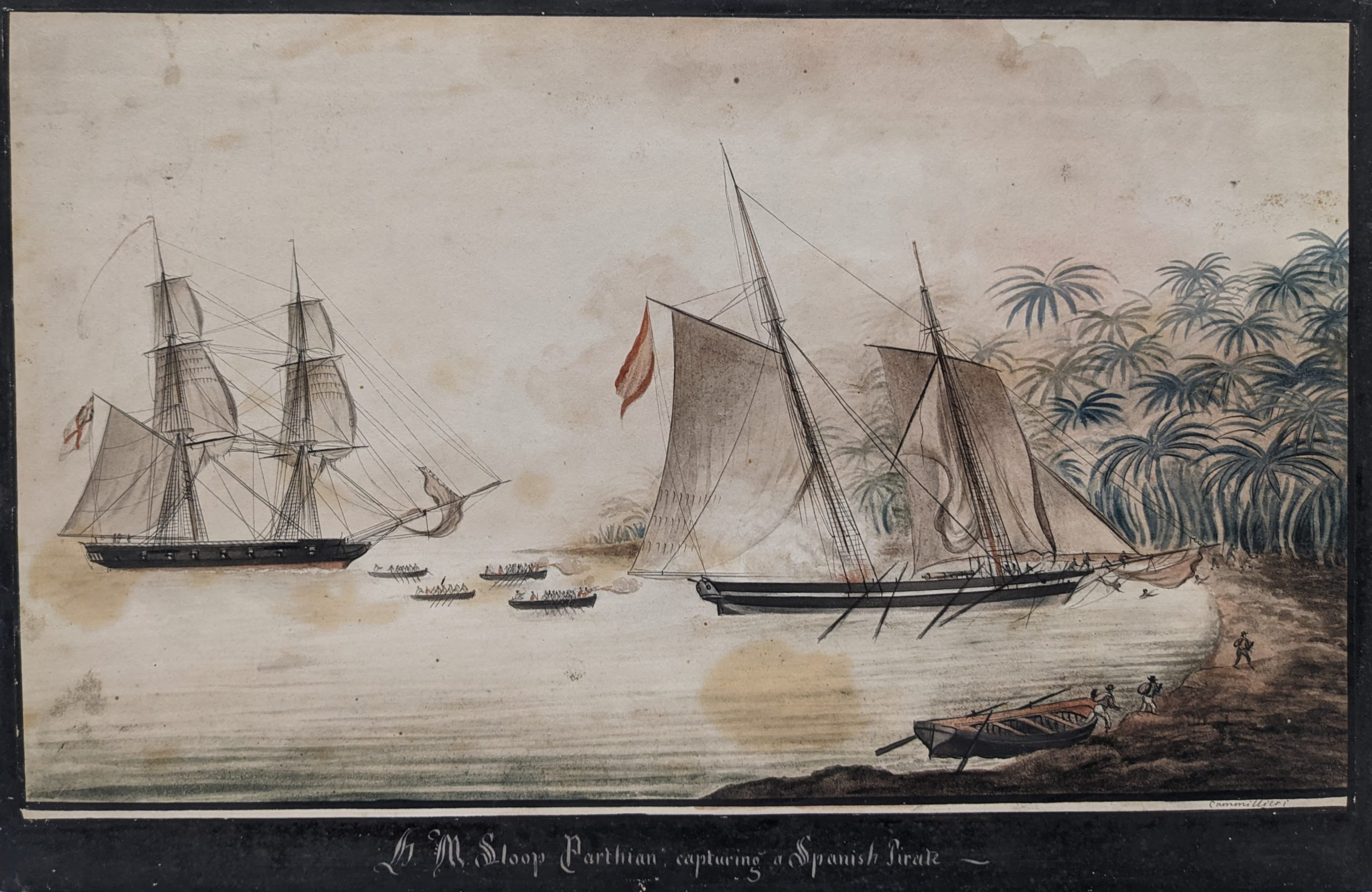
HMS Parthian (left) capturing a Spanish pirate ship

The carronade, nicknamed the "smasher" or "devil gun", was significantly smaller and lighter than conventional cannon. It was also found to have a more destructive broadside at close range, so that a smaller (and cheaper) ship could be more effective in naval actions than a much larger man-of-war. Sir Henry Peake designed a small ship to operate in both shallow and deep waters, carrying eight 16-pounder or 18-pounder carronades plus two long 6-pounder cannon as forward-mounted chase guns.

He completed the design for the Cherokee class in 1807, which was approved on 26 November 1807, with the first four vessels having been ordered in March 1807 but not laid down until December; by the end of 1808 another thirty vessels had been ordered to this design. After these 34, another two were ordered in 1812 which were built of teak at Bombay. The design was revived after the end of the Napoleonic Wars, and another 78 were ordered in two batches between 1817 and 1827. The first batch of these later vessels consisted of 35 orders (of which one was cancelled) whilst the second amounted to 44 new vessels of which four were cancelled and six replaced by orders for paddle vessels.

The class was much criticised, being popularly known as 'coffin brigs', following the loss by wrecking or foundering of a number of them. Almost a quarter of them were lost, and they were also nicknamed "Half Tide Rock" as they had low freeboard so the deck was frequently awash with water, and solid bulwarks preventing the water from being shed quickly. These open flush-decked ships lacked a forecastle to deflect heavy seas crashing over the bow: one was added to Beagle in 1825 before its first voyage, together with a mizzen mast which improved the handling. Despite these modifications to the design, Captain Pringle Stokes protested that "our decks were constantly flooded".

Further extensive modifications were made for the second voyage of HMS Beagle. Darwin noted in his journal in April 1833 that "It blew half a gale of wind; but it was fair & we scudded before it. — Our decks fully deserved their nickname of a "half tide rock"; so constantly did the water flow over them", but John Lort Stokes who was on all three survey expeditions praised Beagle: "The reader will be surprised to learn that she belongs to that much-abused class, the '10-gun brigs'—coffins, as they are not infrequently designated in the service; notwithstanding which, she has proved herself, under every possible variety of trial, in all kinds of weather, an excellent sea boat."

William James, in his Naval History written before May 1827, dismissed the supposed design faults, and said that it would be "surprising indeed that the navy board would continue adding new individuals by dozens at a time" to "this worthless class". A more recent naval historian, Robert Gardiner, concurs, stating that there seems to have been no particular fault in their design, but they were considered to be somewhat too small for the global duties they took on. According to one experienced commander, they were not easy to sail but, "...if we put an officer who has always been accustomed to a line-of-battle-ship in to one of them, and he proves headstrong and self-sufficient, ten to one he upsets her, but in the hands of a good brig sailor, they are as safe as any other vessel". Lieutenant William Bowers, who spent 12 years in HMS Helicon and Leveret, felt that the class had been unduly criticised, he thought Helicon was a crack sailer once her hold had been restowed. Bowers however, complained that they were wet and cramped, and he particularly bemoaned their lack of warlike capabilities, claiming they had been vastly overrated. Despite these faults, the Cherokee brigs were quick when changing tack and extremely manoeuvrable, and with a crew of only 75, economical to run.

== Service ==
Few of the Cherokee-class ships took part in sea battles of any importance. HMS Lyra and Redpole were at the Battle of Basque Roads in 1809, guiding fireships to their target in the initial attack, and the latter also participated in the Walcheren Expedition later in the same year. Large numbers of them went on to serve as passenger and mail carrying packet ships, running from the UK to the US and Canada.

Several assisted with exploration and survey expeditions, including HMS Barracouta, which served with William Fitzwilliam Owen's survey of the African and Arabian coasts between 1821 and 1826 before being converted to a barque-rigged packet in 1829 and then being sold in 1836.

The first voyage of Beagle set out in 1826 under Captain Pringle Stokes as part of Phillip Parker King's survey of South American coasts, which returned late in 1830 with Beagle by then commanded by Robert FitzRoy. Captain Henry Foster commanded HMS Chanticleer on his survey around the South Atlantic, known as his "pendulum expedition", from 1827 to 1831. Chanticleer was then intended to be used for FitzRoy's next survey expedition, but was found to be in poor condition. Instead, the Beagle was repaired and modified for its famed second survey voyage from 1831 to 1836, which took along the naturalist Charles Darwin as a self-funded supernumerary. The Beagle subsequently carried out a survey of coasts of Australia from 1837 to 1843 under John Clements Wickham and John Lort Stokes.

From 1838 to around 1841 HMS Britomart, commanded by Owen Stanley, carried out survey work and other duties around Australia and New Zealand. Other survey ships of this class included HMS Fairy from about 1832 to 1840, Scorpion from 1848 to 1858 and Saracen from 1854 to 1860.

== 1808–1816 vessels ==
The first four vessels listed below were ordered on 30 March 1807, two more on 26 November 1807 and the next twenty vessels on 31 December 1807. Eight more orders were placed during 1808. All 34 were built by commercial contractors.

Name	Built by contract by	Ordered	Laid down	Launched	Disposition
Rolla	Thomas Pitcher, Northfleet	30 March 1807	December 1807	13 February 1808	Sold 18 April 1822
Cherokee	Perry, Wells & Green, Blackwall	30 March 1807	December 1807	24 February 1808	Sold 26 March 1828
Leveret	Perry, Wells & Green, Blackwall	30 March 1807	December 1807	24 February 1808	Sold 18 April 1822
Cadmus	John Dudman & Co., Deptford	30 March 1807	December 1807	26 February 1808	Coast Guard Watch Vessel in February 1835. Sold 12 March 1864
Achates	Samuel & Daniel Brent, Rotherhithe	26 November 1807	December 1807	1 February 1808	Wrecked 7 February 1810
Parthian	William Barnard, Deptford	26 November 1807	December 1807	13 February 1808	Wrecked 15 May 1828
Briseis	John King, Upnor	31 December 1807	February 1808	19 May 1808	Wrecked 5 November 1818
Jasper	Jabez Bailey, Ipswich	31 December 1807	February 1808	27 May 1808	Wrecked 20 January 1817
Ephira	John King, Upnor	31 December 1807	February 1808	28 May 1808	Wrecked 26 December 1811
Onyx	Jabez Bailey, Ipswich	31 December 1807	February 1808	8 July 1808	Sold 3 February 1819
Badger	Joseph & Thomas Brindley, Frindsbury	31 December 1807	February 1808	23 July 1808	Mooring ship 1834. Broken up 1864.
Opossum	Muddle, Gillingham	31 December 1807	March 1808	9 July 1808	Sold 3 February 1819
Wild Boar	John Pelham, Frindsbury	31 December 1807	March 1808	9 July 1808	Wrecked 15 February 1810
Rinaldo	John Dudman & Co., Deptford	31 December 1807	March 1808	13 July 1808	Sold 6 August 1835
Chanticleer	Daniel List, East Cowes	31 December 1807	March 1808	26 July 1808	Coast Guard Watch Vessel in January 1833. Broken up, completed 3 June 1871
Goldfinch	John Warwick, Eling	31 December 1807	March 1808	8 August 1808	Sold 8 November 1838
Woodlark	William Rowe, Newcastle	31 December 1807	March 1808	17 November 1808	Sold 29 January 1818
Shearwater	William Rowe, Newcastle	31 December 1807	March 1808	21 November 1808	Sold November 1832
Calliope	John Dudman & Co., Deptford	31 December 1807	April 1808	8 July 1808	Broken up, completed 13 August 1829
Hope	Jabez Bailey, Ipswich	31 December 1807	April 1808	22 July 1808	Sold 3 February 1819
Britomart	John Dudman & Co., Deptford	31 December 1807	April 1808	28 July 1808	Sold 3 February 1819
Prince Arthur	John Dudman & Co., Deptford	31 December 1807	April 1808	28 July 1808	Sold 1808 to Sultan of Morocco (prior to completion)
Cordelia	John King, Upnor	31 December 1807	May 1808	26 July 1808	Sold 12 December 1833
Redpole	Robert Guillaume, Northam	31 December 1807	May 1808	29 July 1808	Sunk in action August 1828 against pirate vessel Congress
Helicon	John King, Upnor	31 December 1807	May 1808	8 August 1808	Broken up July 1829
Lyra	John Dudman & Co., Deptford	31 December 1807	May 1808	22 August 1808	Sold 11 July 1818
Beaver	Jabez Bailey, Ipswich	April 1808	October 1808	16 February 1809	Sold 24 June 1829
Drake	Jabez Bailey, Ipswich	27 June 1808	August 1808	3 November 1808	Wrecked 22 June 1822
Rosario	Jabez Bailey, Ipswich	27 June 1808	August 1808	7 December 1808	Sold November 1832
Renard	John King, Upnor	9 July 1808	August 1808	5 December 1808	Sold 29 June 1818
Tyrian	Robert Guillaume, Northam	18 July 1808	August 1808	16 December 1808	Sold 22 July 1819
Bermuda	John Pelham, Frindsbury	18 July 1808	August 1808	20 December 1808	Wrecked 16 November 1816
Rhodian	Robert Guillaume, Northam	18 July 1808	August 1808	3 January 1809	Wrecked 21 February 1813
Sarpedon	John Warwick, Eling	30 September 1808	September 1808	1 February 1809	Wrecked 1 January 1813

Two vessels were ordered 2 October 1812. These were built in India at the Bombay Dockyard under a contract from the British East India Company. They were built of teak, but were otherwise identical to their predecessors.

Name	Built by	Ordered	Launched	Disposition
Sphinx	Bombay Dockyard	2 October 1812	25 January 1815	Sold 6 August 1835
Cameleon	Bombay Dockyard,	2 October 1812	15 January 1816	Broken up in April 1849

== 1818–1821 orders ==
Unlike the wartime batch, all the post-war batches were built in the Royal Dockyards rather than by contractors. Note that several names of vessels from the 1808–1816 batch were re-used for vessels in the second or third batches (as indicated below).

Thirty-five vessels were ordered in 1817–1821 – twelve on 13 June 1817, twelve on 2 November 1818, two on 8 December 1818, six on 23 May 1820, one on 6 January 1821 and two on 19 April 1821.

Name	Built by HM Dockyard	Ordered	Laid down	Launched
Alacrity	Deptford	13 June 1817	October 1817	29 December 1818
Ariel	Deptford	13 June 1817	February 1819	28 July 1820
Barracouta	Woolwich	13 June 1817	June 1818	13 May 1820
Beagle ("Darwin's Beagle")	Woolwich	13 June 1817	June 1818	11 May 1820
Bustard	Chatham	13 June 1817	November 1817	12 December 1818
Brisk	Chatham	13 June 1817	November 1817	10 February 1819
Delight	Portsmouth	13 June 1817	November 1817	10 May 1819
Cygnet	Portsmouth	13 June 1817	November 1817	11 May 1819
Eclipse	Plymouth	13 June 1817	March 1818	23 July 1819
Emulous (2nd of name)	Plymouth	13 June 1817	June 1818	16 December 1819
Falcon	Pembroke	13 June 1817	May 1818	10 June 1820
Frolic	Pembroke	13 June 1817	August 1818	10 June 1820
Lyra (2nd of name)	Plymouth	2 November 1818	March 1819	1 June 1821
Jasper (2nd of name)	Portsmouth	2 November 1818	May 1819	26 July 1820
Britomart (2nd of name)	Portsmouth	2 November 1818	June 1819	24 August 1820
Partridge	Plymouth	2 November 1818	December 1819	22 March 1822
Reynard (2nd of name)	Pembroke	2 November 1818	May 1820	26 October 1821
Weazle	Chatham	2 November 1818	May 1820	26 March 1822
Kingfisher	Woolwich	2 November 1818	December 1820	11 March 1823
Procris	Chatham	2 November 1818	March 1821	21 June 1822
Algerine	Deptford	2 November 1818	April 1821	10 June 1823
Magnet	Woolwich	2 November 1818	June 1821	13 March 1823
Halcyon	Woolwich	2 November 1818	unknown	Cancelled; 21 February 1831
Zephyr	Pembroke	2 November 1818	November 1821	1 November 1823
Opossum (2nd of name)	Sheerness	2 November 1818	November 1819	11 December 1821
Onyx (2nd of name)	Sheerness	2 November 1818	November 1819	24 January 1822
Plover	Portsmouth	23 May 1820	August 1820	30 June 1821
Ferret	Portsmouth	23 May 1820	August 1820	12 October 1821
Hope (2nd of name)	Plymouth	23 May 1820	March 1822	8 December 1824
Mutine	Plymouth	23 May 1820	April 1822	19 May 1825
Forester	Deptford	23 May 1820	unknown	Re-ordered at Chatham; 23 May 1826
Griffon	Deptford	23 May 1820	unknown	Re-ordered at Chatham; 23 May 1826
Tyrian (2nd of name)	Woolwich	6 January 1821	April 1823	16 September 1826
Philomel	Portsmouth	19 April 1821	June 1821	28 April 1823
Royalist	Portsmouth	19 April 1821	August 1821	12 May 1823

== 1823–1826 orders ==
Forty-four vessels were ordered in 1823–1826, thirty on 25 March 1823, two on 23 November 1824, two on 7 December 1824, four on 23 May 1826 and six on 28 October 1826. Of these only thirty-four were built as sailing brigs; four were cancelled outright, and the orders for six more were replaced (before any work had commenced) by orders for paddle vessels, using the same names.

Name	Built by HM Dockyard	Ordered	Laid down	Launched
Leveret (2nd of name)	Portsmouth	25 March 1823	May 1823	19 February 1825
Musquito	Portsmouth	25 March 1823	May 1823	19 February 1825
Hearty	Chatham	25 March 1823	July 1823	22 October 1824
Myrtle	Portsmouth	25 March 1823	July 1823	14 September 1825
Lapwing	Chatham	25 March 1823	September 1823	20 February 1825
Sheldrake	Pembroke	25 March 1823	November 1823	19 May 1825
Harpy	Chatham	25 March 1823	March 1824	16 July 1825
Fairy	Chatham	25 March 1823	July 1824	25 April 1826
Skylark	Pembroke	25 March 1823	May 1825	6 May 1826
Espoir	Chatham	25 March 1823	January 1825	9 May 1826
Calypso (2nd of name) (ex Hyaena)	Chatham	25 March 1823	March 1825	19 August 1826
Spey	Pembroke	25 March 1823	July 1825	6 October 1827
Variable	Pembroke	25 March 1823	May 1826	6 October 1827
Briseis (2nd of name)	Deptford	25 March 1823	August 1827	3 July 1829
Rapid	Portsmouth	25 March 1823	January 1824	17 August 1829
Recruit	Portsmouth	25 March 1823	February 1825	17 August 1829
Reindeer	Plymouth	25 March 1823	December 1824	29 September 1829
Thais	Pembroke	25 March 1823	July 1828	12 October 1829
Rolla (2nd of name)	Plymouth	25 March 1823	June 1825	10 December 1829
Savage	Plymouth	25 March 1823	October 1829	29 December 1830
Saracen	Plymouth	25 March 1823	December 1829	30 January 1831
Scorpion	Plymouth	25 March 1823	June 1830	28 July 1832
Sealark	Plymouth	25 March 1823	November 1830	Cancelled; 10 January 1831
Hyaena (ex Calypso)	Deptford	25 March 1823	unknown	Cancelled; 21 February 1831
Termagent	Portsmouth	23 November 1824	October 1829	26 March 1838
Lynx	Portsmouth	23 November 1824	February 1830	2 September 1833
Nautilus	Woolwich	7 December 1824	April 1829	11 March 1830
Curlew	Woolwich	7 December 1824	November 1829	25 February 1830
Delight (2nd of name)	Chatham	23 May 1826	August 1827	27 November 1829
Algerine (2nd of name)	Chatham	23 May 1826	October 1827	1 August 1829
Griffon (2nd of name)	Chatham	23 May 1826	July 1830	11 September 1832
Forester (2nd of name)	Chatham	23 May 1826	September 1830	28 August 1832
Partridge (2nd of name)	Pembroke	28 October 1826	August 1828	12 October 1829
Wizard	Pembroke	28 October 1826	October 1829	24 May 1830
Charybdis	Portsmouth	28 October 1826	December 1829	27 February 1831
Buzzard	Portsmouth	28 October 1826	December 1829	23 March 1834
Foxhound	Plymouth	28 October 1826	unknown	Cancelled; 21 February 1831
Helena	Plymouth	28 October 1826	unknown	Cancelled; 21 February 1831

Six of the vessels originally ordered 25 March 1823 were swiftly re-ordered as paddle steamers in May 1824 – Alban and Carron (both at Deptford), Columbia, Confiance, Dee and Echo (all four at Woolwich).
