= Henry Peake =

British shipbuilder (1753–1825)

Sir Henry Peake (1753–1823) was a shipbuilder and designer to the Royal Navy who rose to be Surveyor of the Navy.

== Life ==
Peake was born in 1753 in (or close to) Portsmouth. He joined the Royal Navy in May 1762 aged only 9, as an apprentice ship's carpenter. There is "Henry Peake" who was noted as Master Boat Builder at Portsmouth Dockyard in 1762, who is likely his father. The Royal Navy list his works from 1779 when he became Master Shipwright at Sheerness Dockyard.

In June 1806, Peake replaced Sir John Henslow as Surveyor of the Navy, working alongside Sir William Rule. Hos position as Surveyor of the Navy was filled by Ropert Seppings in 1813 but he did not officially retire until 1822.

Peake was knighted by George IV on 25 June 1814. Peake died in 1823 in Dover.

== Family ==
He was married to Sarah Ladd. They had several sons who became eminent Royal Navy officers:

- Admiral Thomas Ladd Peake (1782–1865)
- Commander William Peake (1780–1813) killed on HMS Peacock
- James Peake
- Commander Henry Frederick Peake

== Ships built ==
- HMS Polyphemus (1782) 64-gun ship of the line launched at Sheerness
- HMS Europa (1783) 50-gun ship of the line launched at Woolwich
- HMS Vanguard (1787) 74-gun ship of the line launched at Deptford
- HMS Grampus (1802) 50-gun ship of the line launched at Portsmouth
- HMS Colossus (1803) 74-gun ship of the line launched at Deptford
- Royal Sovereign (1804) unarmed yacht launched at Deptford
- HMS Hebe (1804) 32-gun frigate launched at Deptford
- HMS Arrow (1805) 14-gun schooner launched at Deptford
- HMS Minerva (1805) 32-gun frigate launched at Deptford

== Ships designed ==
Note: dates in brackets represent date of design not launch)

- HMS Brunswick (1786) 74-gun ship of the line launched in 1790
- HMS Bermuda (1806) 10-gun sloop
- Cherokee-class brig-sloop (1807) a series of over one hundred 10-gun sloop
- HMS Rapid (1808) 16-gun sloop
- Pygmy-class schooner (1809) 10-gun schooner
- Vesuvius-class sloop (1812) 10-gun sloop equipped as a bomb vessel
- HMS Terror (1812) Vesuvius class bomb ship
- HMS Erebus 10 gun Hecla-class bomb vessel launched in 1826
- Fury-class sloop (1813) 12-gun sloop equipped as a bomb vessel
- HMS Waterloo (1813) 80-gun ship of the line launched in 1818
