= Tacking (sailing) =

Sailing maneuver

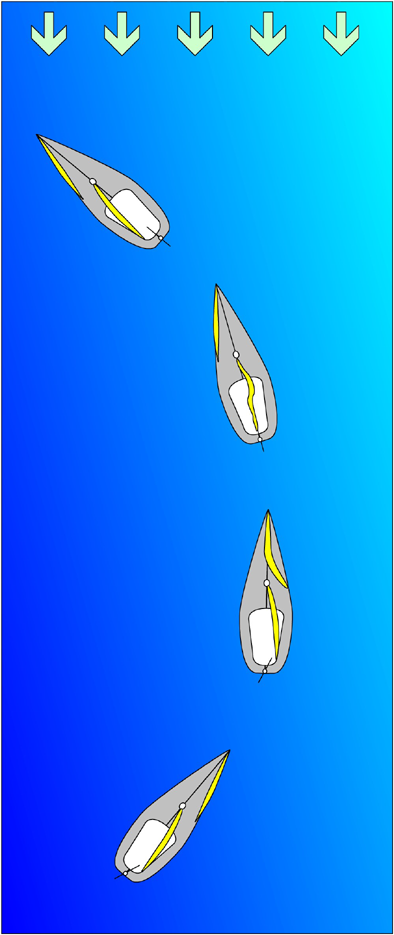
Tacking: Sailing the craft into the wind from the port tack to the starboard tack.

Beating to windward on a series of port and starboard tacks, tacking between each at points 1, 2, and 3.

Tacking or coming about is a sailing maneuver by which a sailing craft (sailing vessel, ice boat, or land yacht), whose next destination is into the wind, turns its bow toward and through the wind so that the direction from which the wind blows changes from one side of the boat to the other, allowing progress in the desired direction. Sailing vessels are unable to sail higher than a certain angle towards the wind, so "beating to windward" in a zig-zag fashion with a series of tacking maneuvers, allows a vessel to sail towards a destination that is closer to the wind than the vessel can sail directly.

A sailing craft whose course is downwind jibes (or "wears" if square-rigged) by having the apparent wind cross the stern from one tack to the other. High-performance sailing craft may tack, rather than jibe, downwind, when the apparent wind is well forward.

== Beating to windward ==
Points of sail: the shaded area is the "no-sail" zone.

Beating to windward on short (P1), medium (P2), and long (P3) tacks, each with a progressively wider corridor over the water.

Sails are limited in how close to the direction of the wind they can power a sailing craft. The area towards the wind defining those limits is called the "no-sail zone". To travel towards a destination that is within the no-sail zone, a craft must perform a series of zig-zag maneuvers in that direction, maintaining a course to the right or the left that allows the sail(s) to generate power. Each such course is a "tack". The act of transitioning from one tack to the other is called "tacking" or "coming about". Sailing on a series of courses that are close to the craft's windward limitation (close-hauled) is called "beating to windward".

=== For various sailing craft ===
The method for tacking of sailing craft differs, depending on whether they are fore-and aft, square-rigged, a windsurfer, a kitesurfer, or a proa.

- Fore-and-aft rig – A fore-and-aft rig permits the wind to flow past the sail, as the craft head through the eye of the wind. Modern rigs pivot around a stay or the mast, while this occurs. For a jib, the old leeward sheet is released as the craft heads through the wind and the old windward sheet is tightened as the new leeward sheet to allow the sail to draw wind. Mainsails are often self-tending and slide on a traveler to the opposite side. On certain rigs, such as lateens and luggers, the sail may be partially lowered to bring it to the opposite side.
- Square rig – Unlike with a fore-and-aft rig, a square-rigged vessel's sails must be presented squarely to the wind and thus impede forward motion as they are swung around via the yardarms through the wind as controlled by the vessel's running rigging, using braces—adjusting the fore and aft angle of each yardarm around the mast—and sheets attached to the clews (bottom corners) of each sail to control the sail's angle to the wind. The procedure is to turn the vessel into the wind with the hind-most fore-and-aft sail (the spanker), often pulled to windward to help turn the ship through the eye of the wind. The main (and often mizzen) sails are braced around onto the new tack as the ship approaches the eye of the wind. Once the ship has come about, the remaining sails are adjusted to align properly with the new tack. Because square-rigger masts are more strongly supported from behind than from ahead, tacking is a dangerous procedure in strong winds. The ship may lose forward momentum (become caught in stays) and the rigging may fail from the wind coming from ahead. Under these conditions, the choice may be to wear ship—to turn the ship away from the wind and around 240° onto the next tack (60° off the wind).
- Windsurfer rig – Sailors of windsurfers tack by walking forward of the mast and letting the sail swing into the wind as the board moves through the eye of the wind; once on the opposite tack, the sailor realigns the sail on the new tack. In strong winds on a small board, an option is the 'fast tack', whereby the board is turned into the wind at planing speed as the sailor crosses in front of the flexibly mounted mast and reaches for the boom on the opposite side and continues planing on the new tack.
- Kitesurfer rig – When changing tack, a kitesurfer rotates the kite end-for-end to align with the new apparent wind direction. Kite boards are designed to be used exclusively while planing; many are double-ended to allow an immediate change of course in the opposite direction.
- Proa – Double-ended sailing vessels, such as proas, may tack by shunting: turning off the wind, switching the sails and steering mechanism end-for-end and then proceeding on the opposite tack with the former stern functioning as the new bow, and with the outrigger on the windward side as before.

=== Navigating ===
The bearing from a sailing craft's current location to a destination or racing mark that lies within the no-sail zone, may lie on one side or other of being directly upwind. The tack on that side is "favored", because the destination lies closest to the craft's highest point of sail—its "best course" is close-hauled on that tack. Wind shifts that improve the angle towards the destination are called "lifts"; those that increase the angle away from the destination are called "headers". A sufficiently large wind shift may cause the destination to lie on the opposite side of the direction from which the destination or mark lies and indicate a tack to the favored side—tacking on a header.

=== Apparent wind sailing ===
High-performance sailing craft, such as sailing catamarans, sailing hydrofoils, ice boats and land-sailing craft, may be capable of speeds exceeding the true wind speed, sailing off the wind. Because the speed of the craft is a dominant contributor to the apparent wind, the apparent wind angle shifts forward. Such sailing craft may tack, while going downwind, under the principle of apparent wind sailing.

== Racing ==
Sailing race courses may be triangular, windward-leeward triangular, or simply windward-leeward, each of which involves at least one leg directly to windward. The windward mark may favor a best course on a given tack, until the wind shifts significantly. Wind strength and the relative position of other sailing craft may determine how frequently to tack. Tacking is not only relatively inexpensive to do, but in some instances, it is even faster than using a motor.

=== Tactics ===
A boat to windward of others enjoys undisturbed air, while disturbing the air for nearby boats that are downwind and behind. To keep this advantage the lead boat will often try to "cover" the trailing boat(s) by maneuvering to keep them "blanketed" in the disturbed air coming from its sails. The trailing boats seek to avoid the disturbed air from boats to windward without losing too much speed or momentum. A "tacking duel" develops when a leading boat decides to cover a trailing boat and the trailing boat seeks to escape the disturbed air. A successful approach for the trailing boat is to tack within the area of maximally disturbed air, where the wind has the least effect on the boat's wind-caused drag (windage).

=== Roll tacking ===
Roll tacking, usually while racing sailing dinghies, involves aggressive heeling of the sailboat, as the skipper and crew move towards the windward side during the first half of the tack when the boat crosses through the wind. The skipper and crew then roll the boat back to an even keel following the completion of the tack, rapidly accelerating the boat back up to speed and allowing the sails to immediately resume their optimum shape on the new tack. The form of the boat in the water, not the rudder, is the primary mechanism for changing course from one tack to the other. Some keel boats may also be roll tacked.

The technique of roll tacking was developed by Peter Claydon who raced dinghies on the River Cam in Cambridge as a teenager (where it was necessary to tack repeatedly in quick succession up the very narrow river). Peter then represented England at the 1969 junior world championships in Bermuda, which he won together with his team mate Nick Martin, demonstrating that the roll tacking technique he developed on the narrow river gave a distinct advantage in open water too. Subsequently the technique became essential to be competitive in dinghy racing.

== See also ==
- Jibe
- Glossary of nautical terms (disambiguation)
- Racing Rules of Sailing
