= Grecian (ship) =

Grecian has been the name of multiple ships:

- Grecian (1824 ship), a ship wrecked on the New South Wales coast in 1864
- Grecian (barque), sailing ship wrecked in 1850 off Port Adelaide
- SS Grecian may refer to:
  - SS Grecian (1879), one of the Allan Line Royal Mail Steamers, rescued survivors of the SS La Bourgogne disaster.
  - SS Grecian (1891), American steel bulk freighter
- HMS Grecian
  - HMS Grecian (1814) was the five-gun American letter of marque schooner Grecian captured in 1814, armed with 10 guns, and sold in 1822.
  - HMS Grecian (1821) was the 10-gun revenue cutter Dolphin, that the Navy purchased and renamed in 1821, and sold in 1827.
  - HMS Grecian (1838) was a 16-gun brig-sloop launched in 1838 and broken up in 1865.
  - HMS Grecian (J352) was a Catherine-class minesweeper launched in the United States in 1943, transferred to the United Kingdom under Lend-lease, returned to the Americans in 1947, transferred by them to the Turkish Navy that same year, renamed Edincik, and stricken in 1974.
