= HMS Redpole (1808) =

1808 brig of the Royal Navy

History

United Kingdom
- Name: Redpole
- Namesake: redpoll
- Ordered: 31 December 1807
- Builder: Robert Guillaume, Northam, Southampton
- Laid down: May 1808
- Launched: 29 July 1808
- Completed: 17 November 1808
- Commissioned: September 1808
- Fate: Sunk in action

General characteristics
- Class & type: Cherokee-class brig-sloop
- Tons burthen: 238 52/94 (tons bm)
- Length: 89 ft 11 in (27.4 m) (gundeck); 73 ft 8 1/2 in (22.5 m) (keel)
- Beam: 24 ft 8 in (7.5 m)
- Draught: 6 ft 6 in (2 m) (bow) 9 ft 3 in (3 m)
- Depth of hold: 10 ft 10 1/2 in (3 m)
- Propulsion: Sails
- Sail plan: brig
- Complement: 75
- Armament: 8 × 18-pounder carronades; 2 × 6-pounder guns long guns

HMS Redpole was a sailing brig of the Royal Navy, launched in July 1808. She was 238 52/94(tons bm), armed with eight 18-pounder carronades and two 6-pound bow chasers, and carried a crew of 75. One of the notorious Cherokee class, dubbed 'coffin brigs' because of the large numbers that were wrecked or foundered, she was sunk in action in August 1828 but prior to that played an active part in the Napoleonic Wars.

At the Battle of the Basque Roads in 1809, she and HMS Lyra guided the fireships into position, during the initial attack, then later engaged French ships, stranded in the Charente River. In September, she took part in the Walcheren expedition; an ultimately unsuccessful attempt to destroy the dockyards and arsenals at Antwerp, Terneuse and Flushing, and to capture the French fleet stationed in the river Scheldt. Redpole was serving in the English Channel Fleet when, on 3 September 1811, she and another Cherokee-class brig, HMS Rinaldo, attacked the Boulogne flotilla, despite being outnumbered. Unable to inflict any substantial damage, the two British brigs eventually withdrew. On 21 September, Napoleon Bonaparte, who was at Boulogne carrying out an inspection of his invasion fleet, spotted Redpole, Rinaldo, the frigate HMS Naiad, and the brigs HMS Castilian and HMS Viper off the coast and ordered a division of 12-gun prames and 15 smaller vessels, to attack. Redpole and Rinaldo badly damaged the 12-gun Ville de Lyon, which was subsequently boarded and captured by men from Naiad.

After the war, Redpole was converted for use as a packet boat and employed on the Falmouth Packet Service. While returning to Britain from Rio de Janeiro in August 1828, she was caught in an action with an 18-gun pirate vessel. Following an engagement of about an hour-and-a-quarter, Redpole sank with all lives lost.

== Design and armament ==
HMS Redpole was a 10-gun brig-sloop of the Royal Navy. Designed by Henry Peake, she was one of the Cherokee class that were later dubbed 'coffin brigs' because of the large numbers that were wrecked or foundered They were not as well armed nor as highly regarded as the larger Cruizer class but were nimble; quick to change tack and with a smaller crew, more economical to run.

The Admiralty ordered Redpole on 31 December 1807 and work began in the May following, when her keel was laid down at the yard of Robert Guillaume in Northam on the banks of the Itchen.

Launched on 29 July 1808, her dimensions were: 89 feet 11 inches (27.4 m) along the gun deck, 73 feet 8 1/2 inches (22.5 m) at the keel, with a beam of 24 feet 8 inches (7.5 m) and a depth in the hold of 10 feet 10 1/2 inches (3 m). This made her 238 52/94 (bm). She would have a complement of 75 men when fully manned.

Her armament comprised eight 18-pounder carronades and two 6-pound long guns directed forward for use as bow chasers. The carronades were lighter so could be manoeuvred with fewer men and had a faster rate of fire but had a much shorter range than the long gun.

== Service ==
Map illustrating the position of the anchored French fleet shortly before the British attack on the night of 11 April. Redpole can be seen marking the shallow water to the west of the Ile d'Aix.

Redpole was first commissioned in September 1808 under Commander John Joyce and was taken to The Downs, where she was completed by 17 November. In 1809, she convoyed a squadron of fireships to the Basque Roads, joining James Gambier's fleet there on 10 April. On the journey out, she and HMS Dotterel captured a chasse maree, Maria Anne on 6 April. At the Battle of the Basque Roads, Redpole was one of the vessels that acted as a lightship, guiding the fireships to their targets during the initial attack on 11 April.

At 12:00 on 13 April, after Lord Cochrane had taken his squadron into the Basque Roads to attack the stranded French fleet, Redpole, Dotterel, HMS Foxhound and two rocket vessels, joined Cochrane at the mouth of the Charente River where several enemy ships had been driven onto the shoals. Cochrane was recalled and replaced in charge by George Wolfe of HMS Aigle. At around 15:30 on 14 April, the brigs and the bomb vessel, HMS Aetna, bombarded the French ships that had been working their way up the river at high tide but were now aground once more. The offensive lasted until 19:00 but had little effect. Sporadic attacks continued on the French fleet until 29 April when the last assailable enemy ship, the 74-gun Regulus got free and escaped upriver. The crew of Redpole would later receive a share of the prize money for the enemy vessels captured or destroyed during the battle.

Later in 1809, Redpole was sent to the North Sea where she took part in Walcheren expedition. Comprising more than 600 vessels and nearly 40,000 troops, it left The Downs on 28 July, intent on destroying the dockyards and arsenals at Antwerp, Terneuse and Flushing, and capturing the French fleet stationed in the river Scheldt. A two-day long bombardment of Flushing forced its capitulation on 15 August and left the British in control of Walcheren, which they garrisoned with 10,000 troops. Schouwen and Duiveland on the Eastern branch of the Scheldt, were occupied peacefully two days later. The French fleet had already withdrawn to Antwerp however, leaving more than 35,000 French soldiers, garrisoned in heavily armed forts at Lillo, Liefkenshoech, and Antwerp, between them and the British. The deliberate destruction of dykes by the French had led to widespread flooding, and with disease spreading through the British army, it was decided to abandon the expedition in early September. Also in September, Commander Colin MacDonald took charge of Redpole and on 10 December, she captured the 16-gun privateer, Grand Rodeur.

In 1811, Redpole was attached to the Western Squadron in the English Channel, keeping an eye on Napoleon Bonaparte's invasion fleet at Boulogne. On 3 September movement was detected among the Boulogne flotilla and Redpole and HMS Rinaldo took up a position to windward in order to attack should any enemy vessels stray too far from the shore. On following a prame and 4-gun brig, they discovered a portion of the flotilla which, despite being outnumbered, they attacked. Minimal damage was done however, and the two British brigs eventually withdrew.

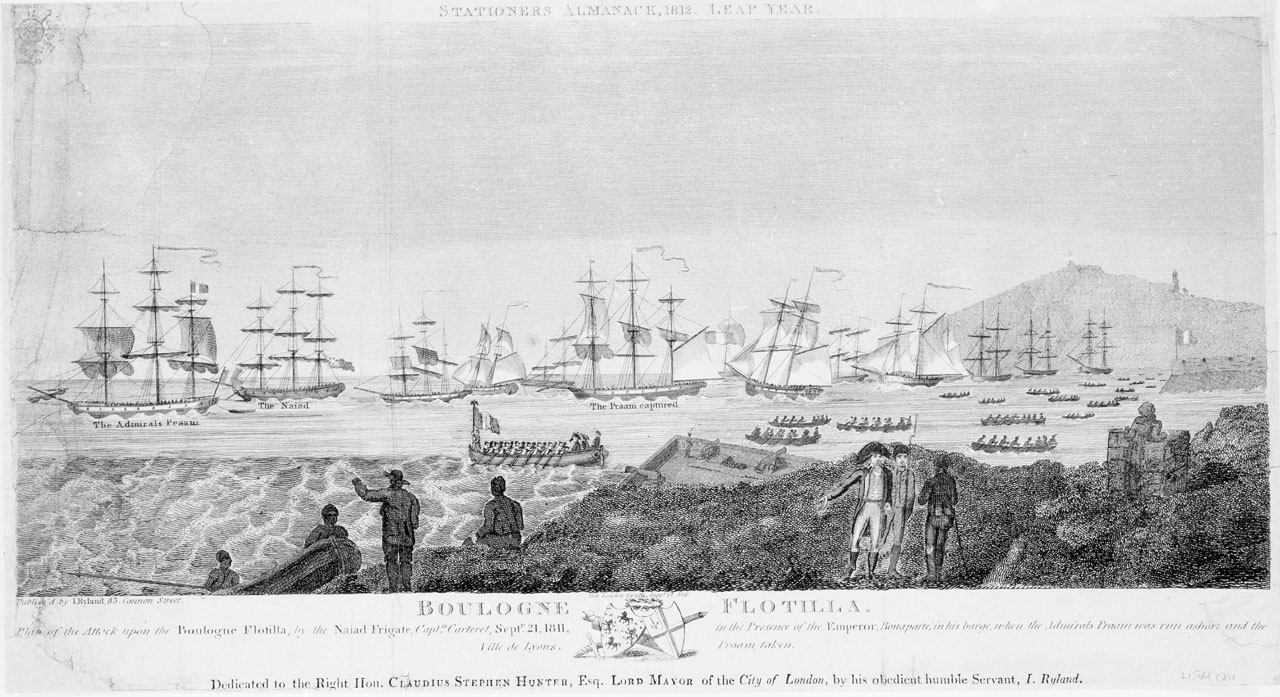
Engagement with the Boulogne flotilla on 21 September 1811

On 20 September Napoleon arrived to inspect his invasion fleet and on discovering HMS Naiad lying off the coast, ordered Rear Admiral Baste to take a division of 12-gun prames, a bomb vessel and ten 4-gun brigs, and attack her. Naiad, anchored with springs, (Note: A spring was a second rope attached to the anchor cable so that by pulling on it, the ship could be slewed round contrary to wind and tide, which would otherwise determine the angle of the vessel.) forced the French to retreat beneath the shore batteries after an hour-and-a-half-long engagement at distance.

The following day, the prames were again sent out with 15 smaller vessels but by then, Naiad had been reinforced by Redpole and Rinaldo, the 18-gun HMS Castilian and 8-gun HMS Viper. Baste only just managed to avoid being captured, and the 12-gun Ville de Lyon, in attempting to rescue his prame, was badly damaged by Redpole and Rinaldo, then boarded and captured by men from the Naiad. The British ships withdrew when the battle drifted within range of the French batteries.

By October 1812, Redpole was back in the Downs and under Commander Alexander Fraser. Between June 1814 and 1815 she was under Commander Edward Denman and in August 1815, Redpole escorted Napoleon, in HMS Northumberland, to exile in St Helena.

== Post-war service and fate ==
Redpole was undergoing repairs at Plymouth from June 1816 until May 1817 then refitted for foreign service, still at Plymouth from September to November 1817. She was recommissioned in September 1817 under Commander James Pasley for a further trip to St Helena. In October 1819, Redpole was at Portsmouth under Commander William Evance, who remained her captain until November 1820 when she was recommissioned by D. D. H. Haye and sailed to the Mediterranean.

Between July 1824 and February 1825, Redpole was converted for use as a packet boat at Plymouth. Under her master, John Bullock, she was employed on the Falmouth Packet Service. While returning to Britain from Rio de Janeiro in August 1828, she was caught in an action with an 18-gun pirate vessel from Buenos Aires, Congress. After an engagement off Cape Frio, lasting about an hour-and-a-quarter, Redpole sank with all hands lost.
