= Crocus-class brig-sloop =

Class of warships

Class overview
- Name: Crocus-class brig-sloop
- Operators: Royal Navy
- In service: 1808 - 1825
- Completed: 10

General characteristics
- Type: Brig-sloop
- Tons burthen: 251 41/94 bm
- Length: 92 ft (28.0 m) (gundeck); 72 ft 8 in (22.1 m) (keel)
- Beam: 25 ft 6 in (7.8 m)
- Depth of hold: 12 ft 8 in (3.9 m)
- Sail plan: Brig rigged
- Complement: 86
- Armament: 2 × 6-pounder bow chasers; 12 × 24-pounder carronades

The Crocus-class brig-sloops were a class of sloop-of-war built for the Royal Navy, and were the only Royal Navy brig-sloops ever designed rated for 14 guns. The class was designed by the Surveyors of the Navy (Sir William Rule and Sir John Henslow) jointly, and approved on 28 March 1807. Unlike the vast majority of other British brig-sloops built for the Royal Navy in this wartime period, which were built by contractors, construction of the Crocus class was confined to the Admiralty's own dockyards. One vessel was ordered from each of the Royal Dockyards (except Sheerness) on 30 March 1807; four more were ordered during 1808 and a final unit in 1810. All the ships of the class survived the Napoleonic Wars and were broken up between 1815 and 1833.

== Vessels ==
In the following table, the Crocus-class brig-sloops are listed in the order in which they were ordered.

Name	Builder	Ordered	Laid down	Launched	Fate
Podargus	Portsmouth Dockyard	30 March 1807	November 1807	26 May 1808	Sold for breaking 7 August 1833
Crocus	Plymouth Dockyard	30 March 1807	November 1807	10 June 1808	Sold for breaking 31 August 1815
Merope	Chatham Dockyard	30 March 1807	November 1807	25 June 1808	Sold for breaking 23 November 1815
Apelles	Woolwich Dockyard	30 March 1807	February 1808	10 August 1808	Sold for breaking 15 February 1816
Portia	Deptford Dockyard	30 March 1807	December 1809	30 August 1810	Sold for breaking 6 March 1817
Prospero	Woolwich Dockyard	23 March 1808	August 1808	9 November 1809	Sold for breaking 30 May 1816
Muros	Chatham Dockyard	3 May 1808	June 1808	23 October 1809	Sold for breaking 18 April 1822
Zephyr	Portsmouth Dockyard	9 June 1808	October 1808	29 April 1809	Sold for breaking 29 January 1818
Banterer	Woolwich Dockyard	19 September 1808	December 1809	2 June 1810	Sold for breaking 6 March 1817
Wolf	Woolwich Dockyard	8 August 1810	August 1812	16 September 1814	Sold 27 January 1825. Worked as a whaler in the Pacific Ocean, hit Wolf Rock and sank on 6 August 1837 off Lord Howe Island.
