= HMS Skylark (1806) =

Brig-sloop of the Royal Navy

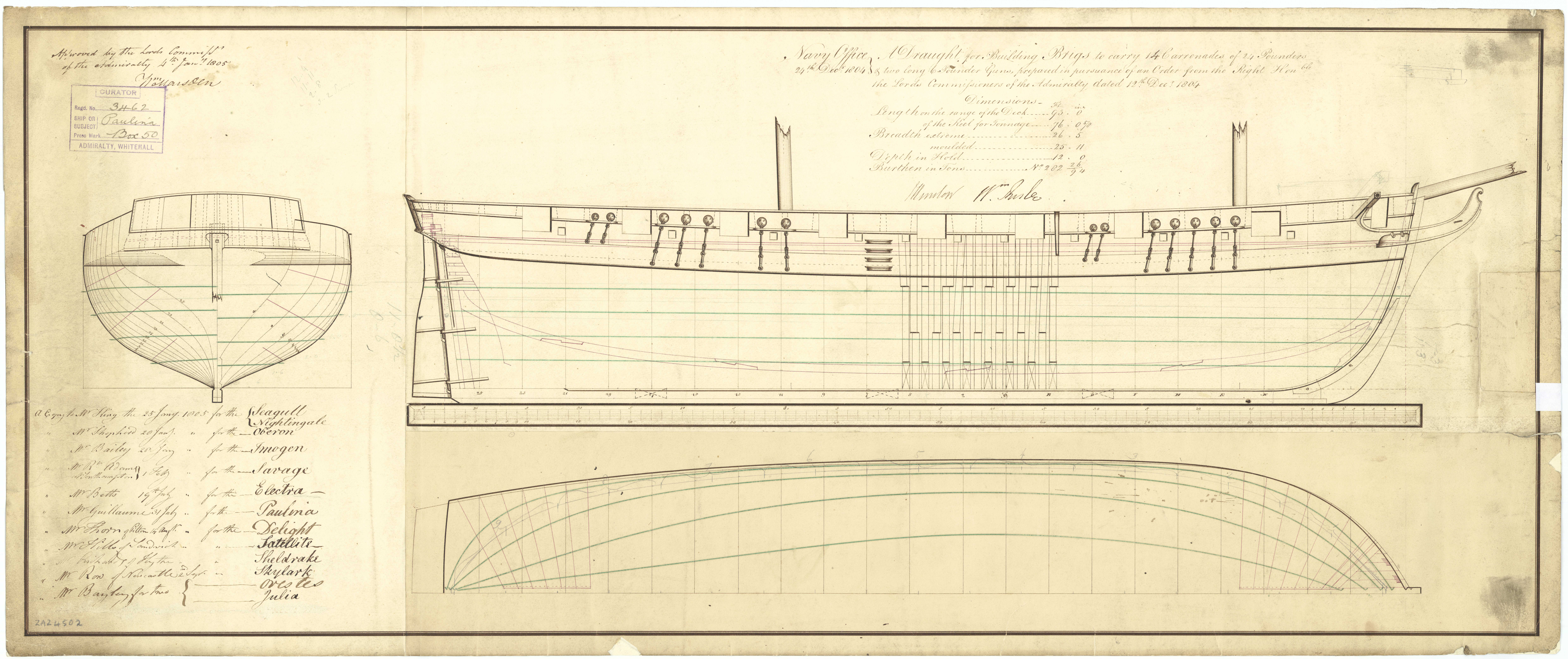
- Skylark

History

United Kingdom
- Name: HMS Skylark
- Ordered: 19 June 1805
- Builder: William Row, Newcastle
- Laid down: November 1805
- Launched: February 1806
- Honours and awards: Naval General Service Medal with clasp "Skylark 11 Novr. 1811"
- Fate: Destroyed May 1812

General characteristics
- Type: 16-gun brig-sloop
- Tons burthen: 282 53/94 bm
- Length: 93 ft 1 1/8 in (28.4 m) (overall); 76 ft 1 1/2 in (23.2 m) (keel)
- Beam: 26 ft 5 in (8.1 m)
- Depth of hold: 12 ft 0 in (3.7 m)
- Sail plan: Sloop
- Complement: 95
- Armament: 14 × 24-pounder carronades; 2 × 6-pounder bow guns

HMS Skylark was a British Royal Navy 16-gun brig-sloop of the Seagull class launched in February 1806. She served primarily in the Channel, capturing several vessels including a privateer, and taking part in one notable engagement. She grounded in May 1812 and her crew burnt her to prevent the French from capturing her.

== Career ==
Commander Henry Evelyn Pitfield Sturt commissioned Skylark in May 1805. On 19 May she captured Anna Sophia, Diercks, master.

Skylark's baptism of fire came on 7 November 1807 when she captured a French privateer lugger. When Skylark approached, the French privateer abandoned the collier brig she had been taking possession off, and fled. Skylark gave chase for almost two hours before she succeeded in capturing Renarde (or Renard, Lennel, captain), of 14 guns and 39 men. Renarde did not surrender until Skylark had fired on her, severely wounding the captain and bringing down the mainmast, and after having tried to board Skylark. Skylark shared the capture with Trompeuse and the hired armed cutter Countess of Elgin, with whom she was in company.

The next day Skylark recaptured Dolphin, Westlake, master, though this may have been the collier brig she had saved the previous day.

On 28 February 1808 Skylark recaptured Peggy, John Scotland, master.

Two months later, on 25 April 1808, Skylark captured the French privateer Furet, which was pierced for 14 guns but only had six on board. Furet and her crew of 48 men were two days out from Boulogne and had not made any captures. Cracker was in company with Skylark.

Skylark was in company with the gun-brig Richmond and the hired armed cutter Princess Augusta when on 20 August they captured the Dutch fishing vessels Meermia (or Mermoné), Johanna, and Stadt Oldenberg.

Commander James Boxer recommissioned Skylark in December 1808.

Julia participated in the unsuccessful Walcheren Expedition, which took place between 30 July and 9 August 1809. Prior to the expedition, on 2 January 1809, Boxer reconnoitered Flushing in advance of the expedition, reporting on the number of Dutch vessels there. However, he did so on the hired armed cutter Idas, rather than on Skylark, as he thought that he could get closer in Idas.

On 13 August she was part of a squadron under Sir Home Riggs Popham that pushed up the West Scheld, but saw no action. The squadron's task was to sound the river and emplace buoys to permit the larger vessels to navigate the river safely. She was among the myriad vessels listed as qualifying for the prize money from the campaign.

Skylark and the hired armed cutter Gambier were in sight on 31 December when Royalist captured François. They therefore shared in the prize money.

On 27 February 1810, Skylark recaptured the ship Ann. When Cordelia recaptured the brig Enterprize, of Newcastle, on 13 December, Skylark shared in the prize money by agreement. That same day Skylark recaptured Iris, and Cordelia shared in the prize money by agreement.

Skylark supported the boats of Theban on 2 February 1811 when they cut out a merchant bring from on shore under the guns of two French batteries near Dieppe. Two days later Theban (in company with Skylark), recaptured Athill (or Atherid). Five days after that, Skylark and captured the Pietre and Amelia. (Note: A first-class share of the prize money was worth £5 17s 2 1/4d; a fifth-class share, that of an able seaman, was worth 1s 3 3/4d.)

On 10 November, Skylark and Locust engaged the Boulogne flotilla. Skylark was seven miles (11 km) north northeast of Cape Gris Nez when Boxer sighted twelve French gun-brigs to his east, sailing along the coast. He gave chase and during the morning Locust appeared and joined in. Together, the two British vessels forced the French flotilla to shelter in the Calais roads. The British succeeded in cutting out gun-brig No. 26, which was armed with four 24-pounder guns and which had a crew of 60 men under the command of Enseigne de vaisseau Boucher, despite small-arms fire from the beach and cannon fire from shore batteries. The British also succeeded in driving the commodore of the flotilla on shore but Boxer called off his attempt to capture the commodore and his vessel when Boxer saw that a great number of troops from Calais had boarded the French vessel. Boxer credited Lieutenant John Gedge, captain of Locust, with being the principal cause of the British success. A prize money notice credited Skylark and Locust with capturing the French privateer Cannoniere the next day. (Note: A first-class share of the prize money was worth £90 6s; a sixth-class share, that of an ordinary seaman, was worth £1 9s 3d.) However, this may have been gun-brig No. 26 given a generic name and mis-identified as a privateer. For his conduct, Gedge received promotion to the rank of Commander. Furthermore, in 1847 the Admiralty awarded the surviving claimants from Skylark and Locust the Naval General Service Medal with clasps "Skylark 11 Novr. 1811" and "Locust 11 Novr. 1811".

Skylark was then in company with Rosario and Royalist when Royalist captured the French privateer Rondeur on 19 December. Royalist captured her quarry after a two-hour chase in the Dover straits. Rodeur, of 14 guns and 60 men, resisted capture, suffering one man killed and 11 wounded, and killing one man and wounding seven on Royalist, before she surrendered.

On 28 March 1812 Skylark seized Ann of Weymouth. (Note: A first-class share of the prize money was worth £72 5s 6d; a fifth-class share was worth 16s 0 1/2d.)

== Fate ==
Skylark and Apelles were blockading the French coast between Cape Gris Nez and Étaples when at 3am on the morning of 3 May a thick fog descended. Within 45 minutes Skylark was aground. The subsequent court-martial blamed the master and the pilot for having sailed too close to the shore, for not having used the lead, and for having failed to notify the captain of the onset of the fog. The court-martial disrated the master, William Turner, for neglect and inattention; it sentenced the pilot, John Norris, to the loss of all back pay and to three months imprisonment in the Marshalsea Prison.

All efforts to free Skylark failed and in the morning shore batteries started firing on her as French troops started to gather. Boxer ordered all his men into the boats and set fire to Skylark as he left.

Apelles too had run aground in the fog at about 4am, and within sight of Skylark. Shore batteries fired on Apelles too, and troops gathered. All efforts to free her failed and by 6am Commander Frederick Hoffman ordered the crew into the boats. There was not enough room for all, so Hoffman and 19 of his men stayed behind. Boxer came alongside in a boat and urged Hoffman to leave, but Hoffman refused to do so as long as some of his men were still on board. As more French troops arrived with field artillery, Hoffman raised a white flag at about 6:30am.

The French took Hoffman and his men prisoner and refloated Apelles. However, the next day Bermuda and Rinaldo arrived and were able to drive Apelles on shore. Then Castillian and Phipps arrived. Gunfire from the British squadron drove the French off, permitting boats from Bermuda to recapture Apelles.
