= Malvina (ship) =

Several vessels have been named Malvina for Malvina:

- Malvina (1796 ship) was launched in 1796 in the United States. She first appeared in British on-line sources in 1800 as a West Indiaman. She made one voyage as a slave ship in the triangular trade in enslaved persons between May 1803 and late 1804, when she was captured.
- Malvina (1807 ship) was a privateer brig from Nantes commissioned circa 1807. The Royal Navy captured her in 1808.
- Malvina (1810 ship) was launched at Aberdeen in 1810. In 1811, she sailed to North America to acquire timber; on her way over she carried a small number of Scots emigrants. She returned to trading between the United Kingdom and the Mediterranean. A United States privateer captured her in March 1813.
