= HMS Royalist (1807) =

Sloop of the Royal Navy

- Royalist

History

United Kingdom
- Name: HMS Royalist
- Ordered: 27 January 1806
- Laid down: May 1806
- Launched: 10 January 1807
- Honours and awards: Naval General Service Medal (NGSM) with clasps: "Royalist May and June 1810"; "Royalist 29 Decr. 1812"
- Fate: Sold 3 February 1819

General characteristics
- Class & type: Cruizer-class brig-sloop
- Tons burthen: 38232/94 (bm)
- Length: Overall:100 ft 0 in (30.5 m); Keel:77 ft 3 1/2 in (23.6 m)
- Beam: 30 ft 6 in (9.3 m)
- Depth of hold: 12 ft 9 in (3.9 m)
- Sail plan: Brig
- Complement: 121
- Armament: 16 × 32-pounder carronades + 2 × 6-pounder bow chasers

United Kingdom
- Name: Royalist
- Owner: W.Smith
- Acquired: 1819 by purchase
- Fate: Condemned August 1832

General characteristics
- Tons burthen: Whaler (after lengthening):387, or 399, or 400(bm)
- Sail plan: Brig

HMS Royalist was launched in 1807. She captured many privateers and letters of marque, most French, but also some from Denmark and the United States. Her crew twice were awarded the Naval General Service Medal. She was instrumental in the capture of a French frigate. The Royal Navy sold her in 1819. She then became a whaler, making three complete voyages. She was condemned after a mishap while on her fourth.

== Royal Navy ==
=== Commander John Maxwell ===
Commander John Maxwell commissioned Royalist in May 1807 for the Downs.

Lloyd's List (LL) reported that Royalist had detained and sent into the Downs Henry, Thompson, master. Henry had been sailing from Amsterdam to New York.

On 14 December HMS Astraea captured the French privateer lugger Providence. Providence carried 14 guns and a crew of 52 men. At the time of the capture, Royalist had joined the pursuit and gun-brigs Wrangler and Tickler were in sight. Royalist brought her into the Downs. (Note: French sources list a Providence of 1807, a privateer schooner from Genoa, commissioned at an unknown date.)

Royalist recaptured and sent into Dover Hope, of and from Poole, which a French privateer had captured. Hope had been carrying a cargo of pipe clay.

Next, Royalist sent into the Downs Doris and Union, which had been sailing from Rotterdam to the Baltic.

On 16 July 1808 Royalist captured the Danish privateer schooner Aristides after a three-hour chase. Aristides was American-built, pierced for 16 guns but with only six mounted; she had a crew of 41 men. She had sailed that morning from "Flodstrand". She had been provisioned for a five-month cruise off the coast of Scotland. Royalist's arrival on the scene prevented Aristides from succeeding in capturing an English packet boat off Goteborg. Royalist sent Aristides, which she had captured near the Scaw, into the Downs.

On 4 March 1809, Royalist bought into Ramsgate the brig Concordia, of Sunderland. A French privateer lugger had captured Concordia the day before, but when Royalist found the brig she had been abandoned by her captor and crew.

On the evening of 1 May 1809 Royalist was some seven or eight leagues north of Dieppe when she encountered five French privateer luggers. Maxwell immediately gave chase and after two hours 15 minutes succeeded in capturing Princesse, of 16 guns and 50 men. The other four privateers made their escape as Royalist was taking on her crew as prisoners. Maxwell was pleased with his catch as Princess had cruised successfully against British trade. Royalist brought her into the Downs the next day. Osprey was in sight when Royalist captured Princess de Bologna. (Note: Princesse, or Princesse de Bologne, or Princesse de Boulogne was a privateer commissioned at Boulogne in 1807, under Jacques Broquant. She made a second cruise from Dunkirk from March 1808 under a Captain Altazin and a third from Dieppe in September 1808. She operated from Calais from December 1808.)

In July–September 1809 Royalist was one of the many Royal Navy vessels that participated in the Walcheren Campaign. There was a distribution of prize money after 20 March 1813. (Note: A captain's share was worth £7 19s 3½d; the share of a seaman or marine was worth 1s 6¼d.)

On 17 November Royalist was between Dungeness and the South Foreland where she captured the fast-sailing French privateer Grand Napoléon. Grand Napoléon was armed with 18 guns and had a crew of 75 men. Royalist sent Grand Napoléon into the Downs. (Note: Grand Napoléon was from Boulogne, purchased for 25,000 francs from a Mr. Foube from Calais and commissioned in September 1808. Under Pierre-Marie Wasselin she cruised with 68 men from September 1808 to February 1809, and under Antoine Huret, with 55 men, she cruised from June 1809 to November 1809.)

In December Royalist captured two more French privateers. On 6 December she captured the French privateer cutter Heureuse Étoile, of two guns and 15 men. Heureuse Étoile had sailed from Dieppe in the evening of 5 December and had not taken any prizes.

On 10 December Royalist captured Beau Marseille (or more correctly Bon Marcel), a privateer lugger of 14 guns and 60 men. Maxwell described her as "a very beautiful Vessel, only Three Months old, and considered one of the fastest Sailers out of Boulogne." One privateer, probably Heureuse Étoile, arrived at Dover on 8 December. Royalist brought another vessel, almost certainly Beau Marseille, captured off Dungeness, into the Downs on 11 December. The Royal Navy took Bon Marcel into service as HMS Defender.

Still in December, on the 31st Royalist captured François. a privateer lugger of 14 guns and 60 men. François was three days out of Boulogne and had made no captures. (Note: François, from Boulogne, was commissioned in September 1809 under François-Jean-Nicolas Delpierre.) Skylark and the hired armed cutter Gambier were in sight on 31 December when Royalist captured François. They therefore shared in the prize money.

Royalist also recaptured two British merchant vessels. One of these two may have been Alpha, recaptured on 26 December. The other may have been Sincerity, which Royalist recaptured and sent into the Downs. Sincerity had been sailing from London to Dartmouth. Francois arrived in the Downs.

On 24 February 1810 Royalist captured the privateer lugger Prince Eugène, of 14 guns and 55 men. Prince Eugène had left Boulogne that day in the company of three other privateers. She had not made any captures. Prince Eugène arrived in the Downs. (Note: Prince Eugène, of Boulogne, was commissioned in September 1809 under a J-B Fournier, with 45 to 55 men and 14 guns totalling 28 pounds of shot.)

This string of successes led to Maxwell receiving a promotion to post captain in June. Also, in 1847 the Navy awarded any still surviving crew members the clasp "Royalist May and June 1810" to the NGSM. (Curiously, the dates on the medal's clasp are wrong.)

=== Commander George Downie ===
Commander George Downie replaced Maxwell in June 1810 at Portsmouth.

About 4 miles off St. Valery en Caux on 5 December 1810, Royalist captured the privateer lugger Roi de Naples, of 14 guns and 48 men. She was a few hours out of Dieppe and had captured nothing. She came into Dover. (Note: Roi de Naples was from Boulogne and commissioned in July 1810 under Denis-Guillaume Lasalle.)

Then on 18 December, Royalist was about 15 miles off Fécamp when she took the privateer Aventuriers (Aventurière), of 14 guns and 50 men, a one month old lugger a few days into her first cruise. She had taken nothing. Adventuriers came into the Downs on the next day. (unnumbered, p. 333):

Royalist was between Saint-Valery-en-Caux and Fecamp on 3 February 1811 when she sighted a strange sail. Royalist soon made the stranger out to be a privateer lugger and gave chase. A few hours into the chase Castilian came up and the two British brigs were able to get the lugger to strike. She was Braconnier, had a crew of 47 men, and had thrown overboard her 10 guns during the chase. She was two days out of St. Valery and had made no captures. HMS Zephyr was in sight. Braconnier came into the Downs. (Note: Braconnier, from Saint-Valery-en-Caux, was commissioned in January 1810 by Frédéric Follin with 50 men.)

On 12 August Royalist captured the smuggler Extra. Then on the 18th she captured the smuggler Dove.

On 7 October Royalist chased a privateer but lost her quarry when Royalist lost her main top gallant mast.

Then on 19 December Royalist was between Dover and Calais when she captured the privateer Rôdeur after a two-hour chase and an exchange of fire. Rôdeur was armed with 14 guns and had a crew of 60 men. In the engagement Royalist had one man killed and five men wounded; Rôdeur had one man killed and 11 men wounded. Rôdeur, which Royalist had captured between Folkestone and Dungeness, came into Ramsgate. (Note: Rôdeur was a privateer from Bordeaux commissioned in 1810 under a P.A. Marraud with 60 men and 14 guns.) Royalist was in company with Skylark and Rosario awhen Royalist captured "Rondeur" on 19 December.

On 25 December Royalist captured Po.

On the night of 6 January 1812 Royalist was off Folkestone where after a short chase she captured the French privateer lugger Furet. Furet, of 14 guns and 56 men, and was two days out of Calais. She had taken no prizes. (Note: Furet had been commissioned in August 1810 under Thomas Souville.)

Also on 6 January Royalist recovered nine barrels of brandy at sea.

On 10 August Royalist captured Pileus, a smuggler.

On 29 December Royalist captured a French privateer lugger Rusé off Hythe, Kent. Rusé, of 16 guns and 65 men, was an entirely new vessel on her first cruise. She one man killed and one wounded, and her main mast was shot away before she surrendered. This single-ship action resulted in the Admiralty awarding the surviving claimants the NGSM with clasp "Royalist 29 Decr. 1812". (Note: Rusé, of Boulogne, had been commissioned in 1812.)

=== Commander J.J.Gordon Bremer ===
Commander J.J.Gordon Bremer was in command of Royalist in January 1813, off the northern coast of Spain.

On 3 April HMS Belle Poule took Grand Napoléon after a chase of nine hours. She was 29 days from New York, carrying a valuable cargo to Bordeaux. She was a new vessel of 305 tons, pierced for 22 guns but carrying only four, and had a crew of 43 men. Harris described her as "copper-fastened, and in every respect one of the finest vessels I ever saw." That same day Dispatch captured the Prussian vessel Enigheidt. Briton, Belle Poule and Royalist shared by agreement. Belle Poule also captured the American schooner Napoléon, which may have been a different vessel than the Grand Napoléon. With respect to Napoléon, Belle Poule was in company with Briton and the hired armed cutter Fancy, with Dispatch and Royalist sharing by agreement.

Royalist shared in the proceeds of the capture of the American schooner Revenge on 11 May.

Since 25 April 1813 a French force, estimated at 13,000 men, had been investing Castro Urdiales on the north coast of Spain. A Spanish garrison of 1200 men, under the command of Don P.P.Alvarez, were holding the town, the French having been forced out in 1812. On 4 May a small squadron of three British brigs, Lyra under Commander Robert Boyle, Rattler, and Sparrow, had come to aid the Spaniards. The French were erecting batteries to the west and south-west of the town. The British landed two 24-pounder guns, which Sparrow was carrying, to arm two counter batteries. During the day Royalist or Sparrow blockaded Portugalete (Bilbao's port), about 12 miles east, to prevent the French using the port. At night, boats from the two vessels patrolled the port. At some point the schooner Alphea joined the effort. The French forces eventually succeeded in overwhelming the Spaniards. Boyle retrieved the guns Sparrow had landed and the British forces manning them. On the 11th, the Spaniards resisted the French in house-to-house fighting and were able to destroy the cannons in the castle. The four British vessels evacuated the Spanish forces and many of the town's inhabitants. The next day the British landed at Bermeo the troops and civilians they had taken on. Spanish casualties amounted to about 50 men killed and a like number wounded. British casualties amounted to four men from Royalist and six from Sparrow wounded, one severely.

Royalist and the privateer Earl St. Vincent on 31 May captured the American schooner Governor Gerry, of 225 tons, six guns, and 18 men. Governor Gerry was sailing from Lorient to New York with a cargo of brandy and wine. Governor Girard arrived at Plymouth on 6 June.

On 6 September 1813 Royalist captured the American letter of marque schooner Ned, after a four-day chase. Ned, of 280 tons, pierced for 16 guns but carrying six, and with a crew of 45 men, was sailing from New York to Bordeaux. Ned had left New York on 1 August in advance of an expected order from the American government placing an embargo on all ports. Ned, Hatchet, master, came into Plymouth. HMS Ajax and Bellona were in sight at the time of the capture.

On 20 October 1813, Royalist came up with HMS Scylla, which was following French frigate Weser. The two British captains decided to attack Weser. They engaged her for about an hour and a half before they had to withdraw to repair their rigging. At about this time a third British vessel, the fourth rate Rippon came up. The next morning, as Rippon and Royalist sailed towards Scylla to renew their attack, Weser sailed towards Rippon and struck, after first firing two broadsides towards Scylla. Scylla suffered only two men wounded in the entire engagement. Royalist suffered more heavily, having two men killed and nine wounded. Weser lost four men killed and 15 wounded. The Royal Navy took her into service as HMS Weser. (Note: A first-class share of the prize money was worth £190 1s 3 3/4d; a sixth-class share, that of an ordinary seaman, was worth £1 11s 3d.)

On 18 December Royalist captured the American letter of marque Antoinette (or Marie Antoinette). Antoinette, of 240 tons, two guns, and 20 men, was sailing from Philadelphia to Bordeaux. Royalist had chased Antoinette into Basque Roads where she had run on shore. Royalist was able to get her off and brought her into Plymouth on 1 January 1814. (Note: A first-class share of the prize money was worth £230 8s 2d; a sixth-class share, that of an ordinary seaman, was worth £1 10s 1d.)

Royalist sailed from Cork on 15 January 1814 as one of four escorts for the West Indies fleet. The fleet arrived at Madeira on 9 February and immediately proceeded on.

On 18 January 1814 Royalist captured the American schooner Joseph, of 63 tons and eight men. She was sailing from Boston to France. Joseph, Brown, master, from Marblehead to France, arrived at Plymouth on 30 January.

Commander Bremer was promoted to post captain on 7 June 1814.

=== Later commanders ===
Commander Thomas Parry James Parry took command of Royalist at Plymouth on 7 June, but left her in November. In December Commander T. Woolridge replaced Parry. At some point Royalist sailed to North America. On 14 July 1815 Commander Houston Stewart took command of Royalist at Jamaica. He transferred to Rifleman in August 1816 at Jamaica, exchanging with Commander George Bennet Allen, of Rifleman. Royalist returned to England and was paid off in Autumn. By 1817 she was at Chatham, presumably in ordinary as there is no record of subsequent commissioning or commanders.

==== Disposal ====
The Principal Officers and Commissioners of His Majesty's Navy offered the "Royalist brig, of 382 tons", lying at Chatham, for sale on 3 February 1819. She sold on that day to W.S.Harper for £1,130.

==== Post-script ====
Parliament voted a special grant to the officers and crews that served under Admiral Lord Viscount Keith on the north coast of Spain and the coast of France in the years 1812, 1813, and 1814. Royalist was among the many vessels that qualified for the grant for service in 1813 and 1814. (Note: The grant was paid in three tranches. First class shares were worth £121 8s 0d, £80 16s 8d, and £53 19s 1d. Sixth-class shares, those of an ordinary seaman, we worth £2 1s 1d, £1 s 5d, and 18s 4d.)

== Whaler ==
Between 1820 and when she was condemned as unseaworthy in August 1832 Royalist made three complete voyages as a whaler. She was lost on her fourth voyage.

Royalist first appeared in Lloyd's Register (LR) in 1820 with Smith, owner, and trade London-Southern Fishery. She first appeared in the Register of Shipping (RS) in 1821 with J.Cook, master, Smith, owner, and trade London-Southern Fishery.

Lloyd's Register gave her origins as "King's Yard", i.e., a Royal Navy Dockyard, but gave no date. The Register of Shipping gave her origins as Chatham in 1812. There is no naval vessel of the burthens the registers gave that were launched at Chatham in 1812 or so and sold in 1819 or so. By 1833, Lloyd's Register showed her as having been built in a King's Yard in 1808. It also showed her as having been lengthened and almost rebuilt in 1819, something that explains the increase in her burthen between her naval service and her service as a whaler.

=== 1st whaling voyage (1820–1823) ===
Captain J. Cook sailed from London on 2 May 1820. He returned on 13 May 1823 with 480 casks of whale oil.

=== 2nd whaling voyage (1823–1826) ===
Captain J. Cook sailed from London on 28 August 1823. He returned on 26 May 1826 with 600 casks of whale oil, worth £14,040.

=== 3rd whaling voyage (1823–1826) ===
Captain Lyme Harris (and his wife), sailed from London on 26 September 1826, bound for Timor. He returned on 24 March 1829, with 500 casks of whaler oil. A court case determined that an ordinary seaman's 1/140 share of the cargo was worth £100 5s 8d.

=== 4th whaling voyage (1829–1832) ===
Captain Thomas Stephen Harris sailed on 24 June 1829, bound for the seas off Japan. At various time she was reported at Guam, Manila, and the Moluccas.

Royalist had undergone small repairs in 1826 and 1829.

== Fate ==
Royalist struck a reef on one of the Philippine Islands circa July September 1832. She was taken in to Ternate, Moluccas. She was surveyed, and condemned as unseaworthy (leaky and unmanageable), on 5 August 1832 and was declared a constructive total loss. She was subsequently sold.

Royalist had gathered 1800 barrels of whale oil by the time she struck the reef. She lost 600 barrels to the damage. Alexander transshipped the 1200 surviving barrels.
