= HMS Apelles =

Warship

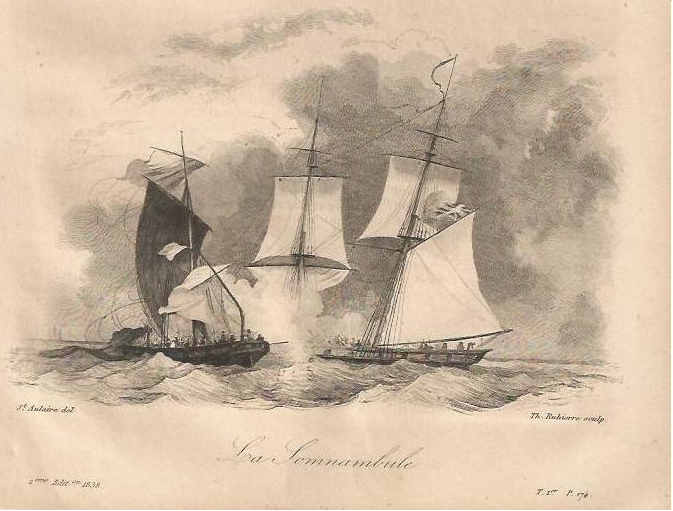
- Apelles and Somnambule. This is an engraving by Felix Achille Saint-Aulaire (1801-99), engraver T. Ruhierre, in the book France Maritime, by Amédée Gréhan, published in 1844, though the picture itself dates to 1837

History

United Kingdom
- Name: HMS Apelles
- Namesake: Apelles
- Ordered: 30 March 1807
- Builder: Woolwich Dockyard (M/s Edward Sison)
- Laid down: February 1808
- Launched: 10 August 1808
- Fate: Sold 1816

General characteristics
- Class & type: Crocus-class
- Type: Brig-sloop
- Tons burthen: 251 41/94 (bm)
- Length: 92 ft 0 in (28.0 m) (gundeck); 72 ft 8 3/4 in (22.2 m) (keel)
- Beam: 25 ft 6 in (7.8 m)
- Depth of hold: 12 ft 8 in (3.9 m)
- Sail plan: Brig rigged
- Complement: 86
- Armament: 2 × 6-pounder bow chasers; 12 × 24-pounder carronades

HMS Apelles was a Crocus-class brig-sloop of the Royal Navy. She was launched in 1808 and sold in 1816. During her service she grounded on the French coast and was in French hands for about a day before the British recaptured her. During her career she captured two French privateers.

== Career ==
Commander Thomas Oliver was appointed captain of Apelles in September 1808. She participated in the ill-fated Walcheren Campaign. Starting on 30 July 1809, a British armed force of 39,000 men landed on Walcheren. However, the French fleet had left Flushing (Vlissingen) and sailed to Antwerp, and the British lost over 4,000 men to "Walcheren Fever", a combination of malaria and typhus, and to enemy action. As the strategic reasons for the campaign dissipated and conditions worsened, the British force withdrew in December. Prize money arising from the net proceeds of the property captured at Walcheren and the adjacent islands in the Scheld was paid in October 1812.

On 19 October 1810 Apelles captured the French privateer Somnambule (or Somnus), of 18 guns and 56 men, off Dieppe. The privateer was so damaged in the engagement before she surrendered that Oliver had to scuttle her.

Before Apelles captured her the privateer had captured the sloop Friends. While Apelles was in sight, Sarpedon recaptured Friends, and sent her into Dover. French sources report that Somnambule (or Somanbule) was a chasse maree commissioned as a privateer in Dieppe in October 1810 under Captain Pierre-Antoine Sauvage. Lieutenant de vaisseau F. Lecomte was Sauvage's second-in-command. In the engagement a musket ball killed Sauvage, and Lecomte took over, and it was he that struck, though not before he himself was wounded. The French sources furthermore give her 11 guns, not 18.

Commander Frederick Hoffman assumed command in December, relieving Oliver. Apelles's officers had informed Admiral George Campbell that Oliver was insane, and that discipline on the sloop had deteriorated. Campbell ordered a Court of Inquiry, and as a result of its report, gently suggested to Oliver that he resign, which, after some hesitation, he did. Hoffman recommissioned her in early 1811.

=== Captured by the French ===
Apelles and Skylark were blockading the French coast between Cape Gris Nez and Étaples when at 3am on the morning of 3 May 1812 a thick fog descended. Within 45 minutes Skylark had grounded.

All efforts to free Skylark failed and in the morning shore batteries started firing on her as French troops started to gather. The crew set fire to Skylark and left in her boats.

Apelles too had run aground in the fog at about 4am, and within sight of Skylark. Shore batteries fired on Apelles also, and troops gathered. All efforts to free her failed and by 6am Commander Frederick Hoffman ordered his crew into the boats. Unfortunately there was not enough room for all, so Hoffman and 19 of his men stayed behind. Commander Boxer, of Skylark, came alongside in a boat and urged Hoffman to leave, but Hoffman refused to do so while some of his men were still on board. As more French troops arrived with field artillery, Hoffman raised a white flag at about 6:30am. Before he gave up his ship, Hoffman and the purser burned all Apelles's signal books and other instructions.

The French took Hoffman and his men prisoner and refloated Apelles. However, the next day Bermuda and Rinaldo arrived and were able to drive Apelles on shore. Then Castillian and Phipps arrived. Gunfire from the British squadron drove the French off, permitting boats from Bermuda to recapture Apelles. (Note: Hoffman remained a prisoner of the French for two years. His court-martial for the loss of Apelles exonerated him completely, returning his sword to him.)

=== Return to service ===
Between May and September Apelles underwent refitting at Sheerness. She then came under the command of Commander Charles Robb.

Robb was already captain in December when Apelles captured the Danish vessels No. 23 (3 December), Haabet (13 December), and Falken (20 December).

At daybreak on 18 February 1813, Apelles captured the French privateer cutter Ravisseur at 57°10′N 5°30′E. Ravisseur was armed with ten 9-pounder carronades and four long 6-pounder guns, and had a crew of 51 men under the command of M. Alexander Happey. She was 12 days out of Dunkirk and had intended to cruise off Flamborough Head, but westerly gales had driven her eastward. She had not made any captures. Apelles sent her into Leith. (Note: Ravisseur was a privateer commissioned in Dunkirk in 1812 under the command of Lieutenant René-Antoine Happey.)

Commander Robb drowned on 27 February off the Isle of May when a gale of wind washed him overboard. He was assisting in throwing her guns overboard to lighten her. (Note: Grocott reports this based on a report in the Naval Chronicle (Vol. 29, p.264.). Apparently the report confused this event with Apelles's grounding on the French coast the year before.)

Commander Alexander M"Vicar (or McVicar) was appointed to Apelles on 8 March, and recommissioned her that month for the North Sea. McVicar tested a new patent compass in July and wrote a testimonial letter on 13 June. Vice-Admiral Robert Otway had ordered him to test the compass belonging to Mr. Alexander, of Leith, and McVicar used it for some nine weeks, finding it better than the other compasses on Apelles. It was quick to come on point and held its direction in heavy seas and despite shocks such as guns firing or seas striking.

On 11 December 1813, Apelles captured Speculation. (Note: A first-class share was worth £60 9s 1d; a sixth-class share was worth £1 16s 10½d) Speculation, of Bergen, Fornguest, master, reached Leith on 21 December.

In 1814 Apelles visited Archangel, having sailed from Leith with a fleet after first having had to put back.

== Fate ==
Apelles was paid off into ordinary in September 1815. The Admiralty offered her for sale at Sheerness on 17 February 1816. Mr. Marclark purchased her on 6 March 1816 for £800.
