= Action of 15 July 1805 =

1805 naval battle

- Part of the Napoleonic Wars
Date	15 July 1805
Location	off Chausey, France
Result	French victory

Belligerents
France	United Kingdom

Commanders and leaders
(France) Commander Joseph Collet	(United Kingdom) Georges Ker; James Garrety

Strength
8 vessels	HMS Plumper; HMS Teazer

Casualties and losses
None, Collet slightly wounded by a splinter	Two gun-brigs captured

The action of 15 July 1805 was a small naval action that took place off Chausey, on the coast of Normandy, involving two British gun-brigs on one side, and vessels on the other. The becalmed gun-brigs became easy targets for the oar-powered gunboats, which were able to manoeuver as to overpower them and force their surrender. Also, the French vessels were armed with guns, which outranged the carronades that constituted the bulk of the British gunboat's armament.

== Battle ==
In July 1805 Plumper, together with her sister-ship Teazer, were part of the Royal Navy force blockading the coat of northern France. On 15 July the two gun-brigs were off Granville, Manche when they became becalmed. To avoid the tide carrying them onto the coast, the two anchored in the afternoon off Chausey.

The news that the gun-brigs were anchored off Chausey was carried to Commander Joseph Collet, commanding officer of the 1st gunboat division of the Boulogne Flotilla stationed in Granville. Collet departed Granville on 15 July at 21:00, leading seven gunboats and a dogger, or six gunboats, a schooner, and a ketch. (Note: This accounting is based on British court martial records.)

A heavy fog came up and at 2:30 am on 16 July, several French vessels were seen to emerge from the darkness. Plumper attempted to get closer to Teazer so that they could support each other, but was unable to so. The French force, which consisted of six brigs, a schooner, and a ketch, stood off and battered Plumper with their guns. Plumper returned fire, but being armed primarily with carronades, was outranged. During the exchange of fire, Lieutenant James Henry Garrety, Plumper's captain, had an arm shot off, a leg crippled by grapeshot, and his chest lacerated by a piece of langrage. Four seamen were also wounded. After an hour, Sub-Lieutenant Richards, who had taken over command after Garrety had been taken below, struck. Later, some of Plumper's crew accused Richards of having too quickly surrendered. (Note: Garrety survived until 1827 and remained in the Royal Navy. On 5 February 1806 the Admiralty granted him a pension that at the time of his death was worth £200 per annum.)

Having overpowered Plumper, Collet anchored his vessels to give his rowers some rest. After daybreak, Collet pressed his attack on Teazer, which struck at 7:30am.

== Aftermath ==
The French took the two badly damaged gun-brigs into Granville. Plumper in particular was in a sinking condition, and barely reached Granville before she ran aground. Collet was slightly wounded by a splinter, but otherwise there were no reported casualties.

Plumper was brought into service in the French Navy, where she served until 1827; from 1815 on her name was Argus. Teazer was also commissioned in the French Navy, and served under the same name until HMS Diana and HMS Semiramis recaptured her on 15 August 1811.

== Notes, citations, and references ==
=== References ===
- Hepper, David J. (1994). British Warship Losses in the Age of Sail, 1650–1859. Rotherfield: Jean Boudriot. ISBN 0-948864-30-3.
- Marshall, John (1823–1835). "Index" . Royal Naval Biography. London: Longman and Company.
- Quintin, Danielle et Bernard (2003). Dictionnaire des capitaines de Vaisseau de Napoléon. S.P.M. p. 105. ISBN 2-901952-42-9.
- Roche, Jean-Michel (2005). Dictionnaire des bâtiments de la flotte de guerre française de Colbert à nos jours 1 1671 - 1870. ISBN 978-2-9525917-0-6. OCLC 165892922.
- Troude, Onésime-Joachim (1867). Batailles navales de la France. Vol. 3. Challamel ainé. pp. 420–421.
- Troude, Onésime-Joachim (1867). Batailles navales de la France. Vol. 4. Challamel ainé.
- Winfield, Rif & Stephen S Roberts (2015 Forthcoming) French Warships in the Age of Sail 1786 - 1862: Design Construction, Careers and Fates. (Seaforth Publishing). ISBN 9781848322042
