= HMS Wolf (1814) =

Naval brig (1813-1825), and merchantman and whaler (1826-1837)

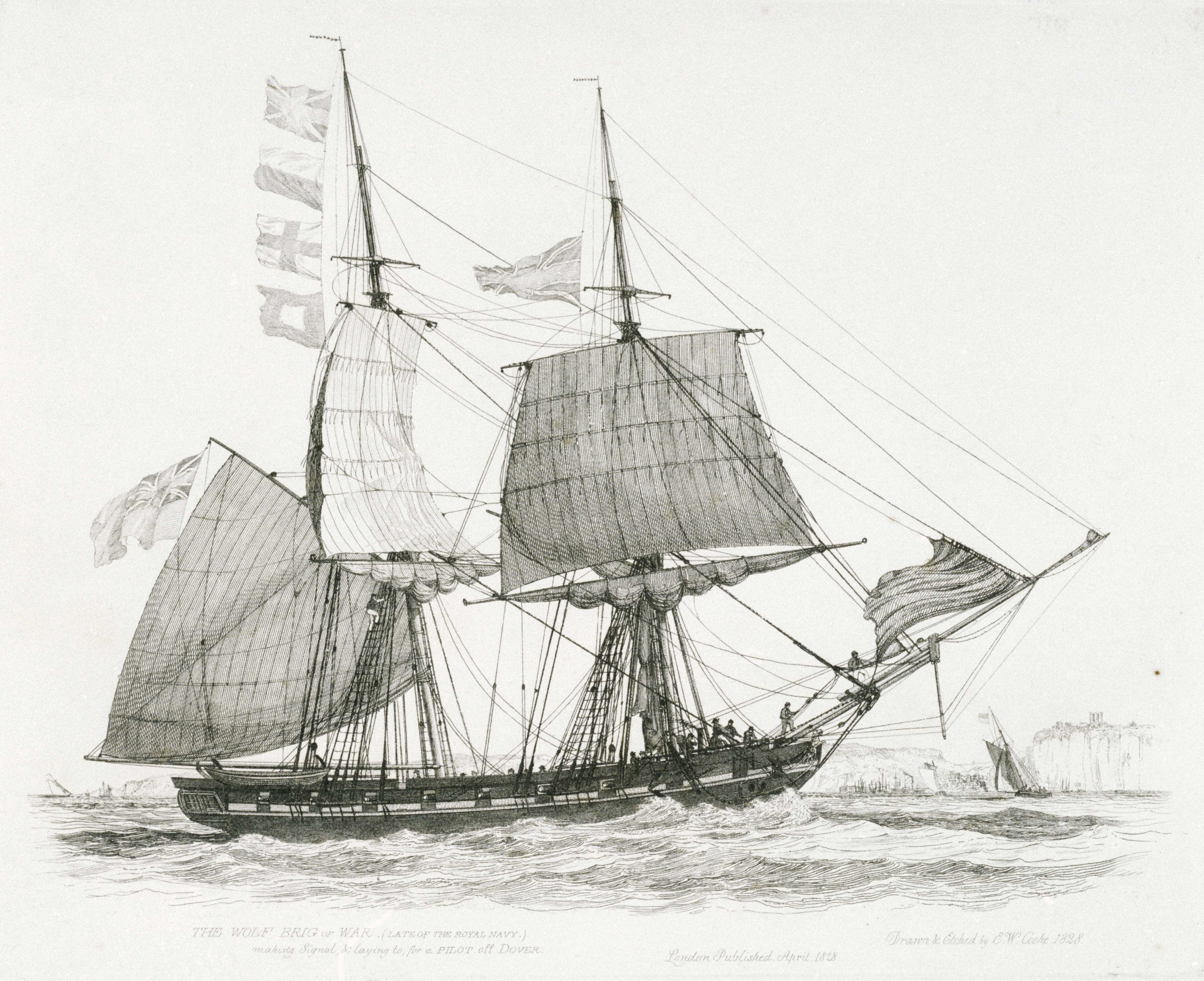
- The Wolf (late of the Royal Navy) making Signal and laying to, for a Pilot off Dover in 1828

History

United Kingdom
- Name: HMS Wolf
- Ordered: 8 August 1810
- Builder: Woolwich Dockyard (M/s Edward Sison)
- Laid down: August 1812
- Launched: 16 September 1814
- Fate: Sold 27 January 1825

United Kingdom
- Name: Wolf
- Acquired: 1825 by purchase
- Fate: Wrecked 1837

General characteristics
- Class & type: Crocus-class brig-sloop
- Type: Brig-sloop
- Tons burthen: 25254/94, or 263, or 265 (bm)
- Length: Overall: 92 ft (28.0 m); Keel: 72 ft 6 5/8 in (22.1 m)
- Beam: 25 ft 7 in (7.8 m)
- Depth of hold: 12 ft 8 1/2 in (3.9 m)
- Sail plan: Brig rigged
- Complement: 86
- Armament: 2 × 6-pounder bow chasers; 12 × 24-pounder carronades

HMS Wolf was a 14-gun brig of the Royal Navy that was launched in 1814 from Woolwich Dockyard, too late for the war. The Navy sold her 1825 and she then became a merchant and whale fishing vessel. She was wrecked in the South Seas in 1837.

== Naval career ==
Wolf sailed to Sheerness on 22 September 1814.

Commander Bernard Yeoman commissioned her on 5 December 1819 for the Cork station. He then sailed her on 27 February 1819. She served on the Irish Station in 1819.

When His Majesty King George visited Dublin in 1821, Wolf was part of the naval escort. Yeoman frequently dined with His Majesty on HMY Royal George, and while the king was in Dublin, Yeoman lived with the household, attended the king in public, and was generally considered as forming part of the royal suite.

== Commercial service ==
Wolf paid off in 1825. The Admiralty listed her for sale at Plymouth on 27 January 1825, and she sold that same day to Thomas S. Benson for £3,1000.

Wolf first appeared in Lloyd's Register (LR) in the volume for 1826.

She underwent several changes of ownership. She was working as a whaler in the Pacific Ocean when she hit an uncharted rock (now called Wolf Rock) on 6 August 1837 off Lord Howe Island, and sank.

Year	Master	Owner	Trade	Notes
1826	W. Christie	Pearl & Co.	London	
1827	W. Christie	Pearl & Co.	London	
1828	W. Christie	Pearl & Co.	London	
1829	Wilson	Captain & Co.	London & Barbados	
1830	Wilson/ J. Lewis	Captain & Co.	London–Barbados	
1831	J. Lewis	Walker	London–South Seas	
1832	J. Lewis	Walker	London–South Seas	
1833	J. Lewis	Walker	London–South Seas	
1834	J Lewis		London	
1835	J. Lewis		London	
1836	J. Lewis		London	
1837	J. Lewis		London	
1838	J. Lewis		London	
