= HMS Rinaldo (1808) =

1808 brig of the Royal Navy

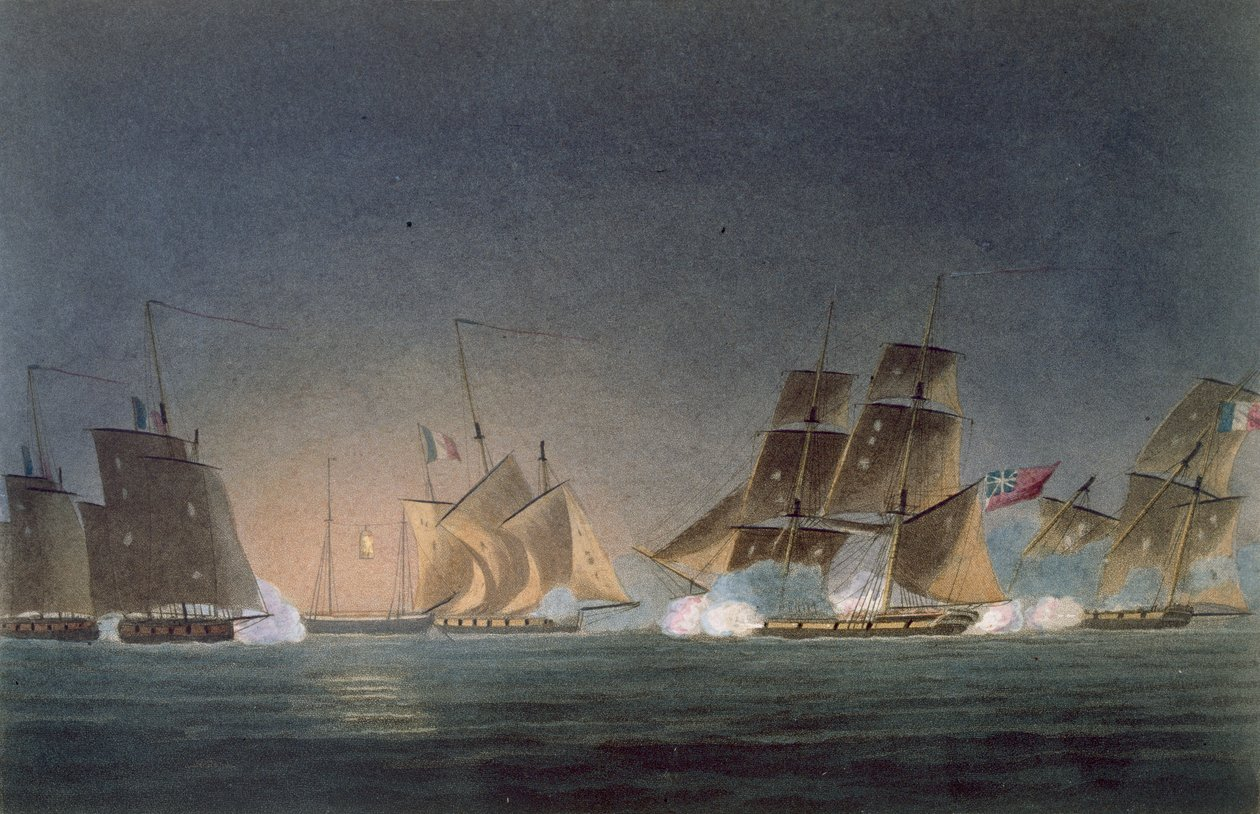
- Rinaldo (second from right) engaging four French privateers

History

United Kingdom
- Name: HMS Rinaldo
- Ordered: 31 December 1807
- Builder: John Dudman & Co. Deptford
- Cost: £3,695
- Laid down: March 1808
- Launched: 13 July 1808
- Completed: 7 September 1808
- Commissioned: September 1808
- Fate: Sold

General characteristics
- Class & type: Cherokee-class brig-sloop
- Tons burthen: 236 66/94 (bm)
- Length: 90 feet 3 inches (27.5 m) (gundeck); 73 feet 10 1/2 inches (22.5 m) (keel)
- Beam: 24 feet 6 1/2 inches (7.5 m)
- Draught: 6 feet 2 inches (2 m) (bow) 9 feet 0 inches (3 m)
- Depth of hold: 11 feet (3 m)
- Propulsion: Sails
- Sail plan: Brig
- Complement: 75
- Armament: 8 × 18-pounder carronades + 2 × 6-pounder long guns

HMS Rinaldo was a Cherokee-class brig-sloop of the Royal Navy that was launched in July 1808. She was 236 66/94(bm), armed with eight 18-pounder carronades and two 6-pound bow chasers, and carried a crew of 75.

Rinaldo was serving in the English Channel Fleet when, on 3 September 1811, she and Redpole attacked the Boulogne flotilla despite being outnumbered. Unable to inflict any substantial damage, the two British brigs eventually withdrew. On 21 September, Rinaldo, Redpole, the frigate HMS Naiad, and the brigs HMS Castilian and HMS Viper were attacked by a division of 12-gun prames and 15 smaller vessels. Rinaldo and Redpole badly damaged the 12-gun Ville de Lyon, which was subsequently boarded and captured by men from Naiad. Under Edmund Lyons, then a commander, Rinaldo and Bermuda chased the 14-gun Apelles onto the shore just west of Boulogne, on 4 May 1812. When Castilian and HMS Phipps turned up, the French abandoned Apelles, allowing boats from Bermuda to secure her.

In 1814, Rinaldo assisted in Thomas Graham's operations in the Low Countries to support an insurrection in the French-held Netherlands. Rinaldo sailed for the West Indies in June 1814 and served for a while on the Jamaica Station before being laid-up at Sheerness in July 1815. Between November 1823 and February 1824, Rinaldo was refitted as a packet boat for service on the Falmouth Packet Station. She paid off for the last time in August 1834 and was sold at Plymouth on 6 August 1835.

== Design and armament ==
HMS Rinaldo was a 10-gun brig-sloop of the Royal Navy. Designed by Henry Peake, she was one of the Cherokee class that were later dubbed 'coffin brigs' because of the large numbers that were wrecked or foundered. They were not as well armed nor as highly regarded as the larger Cruizer class but were nimble; quick to change tack and, with a smaller crew, more economical to run.

The Admiralty ordered Rinaldo on 31 December 1807 and work began in the March following, when her keel was laid down at the yard of John Dudman & Co. in Deptford on the south bank of the Thames.

Launched on 13 July 1808, her dimensions were: 90 feet 3 inches (27.5 m) along the gun deck, 73 feet 10 1/2 inches (22.5 m) at the keel, with a beam of 24 feet 6 1/2 inches (7.5 m) and a depth in the hold of 11 feet (3 m). This made her 236 66/94 tons (bm). She would have a complement of 75 men when fully manned.

Her armament comprised eight 18 lb (8.16 kg) carronades and two 6 lb (2.72 kg) long guns directed forward for use as bow chasers. Carronades were lighter and so could be manoeuvred with fewer men and had a faster rate of fire but a much shorter range than the long guns.

== Service ==
Rinaldo was launched on 13 July 1808 but remained at Deptford while she was completed and fitted out. She was first commissioned in September 1808, under Commander James Irwin and taken to the Downs. On 12 March 1809, she captured the French ketch Ransois. Recommissioned under Commander James Anderson in November 1809, Rinaldo captured a smuggler on 5 January 1810 and a sloop, Hope, on 21 September.

Rinaldo was cruising off Dover on the night of 7 December when she discovered a pair of French armed luggers between her and the English shoreline, which, on seeing her, attempted to run for their own coast. One of the vessels, Marauder, after engaging in a running fight, tried to cross in front of the British brig but was thwarted when the latter closed and the two became entangled. The crews attempted to board each other's vessels. The British, emerging from the fight victorious, took Marauder as a prize. With 14 guns and a crew of 66, the French privateer had been out of Boulogne for 12 days but had failed to make any captures.

Ten days later, off Selsey Bill, Rinaldo engaged four more privateers, sinking one vessel of 16 guns. Rinaldo had left Spithead to take up station at Dover. At 15:30, as she was passing off St Helens, Isle of Wight, the four luggers were seen lying to, out at sea. Rather than indulge in what was thought to be a futile chase, Anderson decided to lure the privateers to him by giving the impression he was fleeing and thus appearing as a potential prize. The plan worked and the four enemy vessels gave chase. The British were careful to hide their armament from view and trimmed the sails to slow Rinaldo down. By the time two of the privateers caught up at 17:00, off the Owers, it was dark. The closest hailed Rinaldo, ordering her to strike while shooting at her with small arms, at which point Rinaldo turned, giving both vessels a broadside with her 18-pound carronades. She then came about and gave the larger of the two a second broadside, bringing down the rigging, and causing so much damage she began to sink. Before she could attend to the stricken ship however, Rinaldo had to force the surrender of the other lugger, which was bearing down on her bow. While Rinaldo was lowering boats to board the one and rescue the crew of the other, the tide carried her onto the Owers lightship, where she became entangled. Seeing an opportunity to escape, the previously struck vessel made off and was joined by her compatriots, the third and fourth privateers, which had since arrived on the scene. On 15 May 1811, Rinaldo recaptured the sloop Speculation.

In 1811, Rinaldo was attached to the Western Squadron in the English Channel to keep an eye on Napoleon Bonaparte's invasion fleet at Boulogne. On 3 September movement was detected among the Boulogne flotilla and Rinaldo and HMS Redpole took up a position to windward in order to attack should any enemy vessels stray too far from the shore. On following a prame and four-gun brig, they discovered a portion of the flotilla which, despite being outnumbered, they attacked. Minimal damage was done however and the two British brigs eventually withdrew.

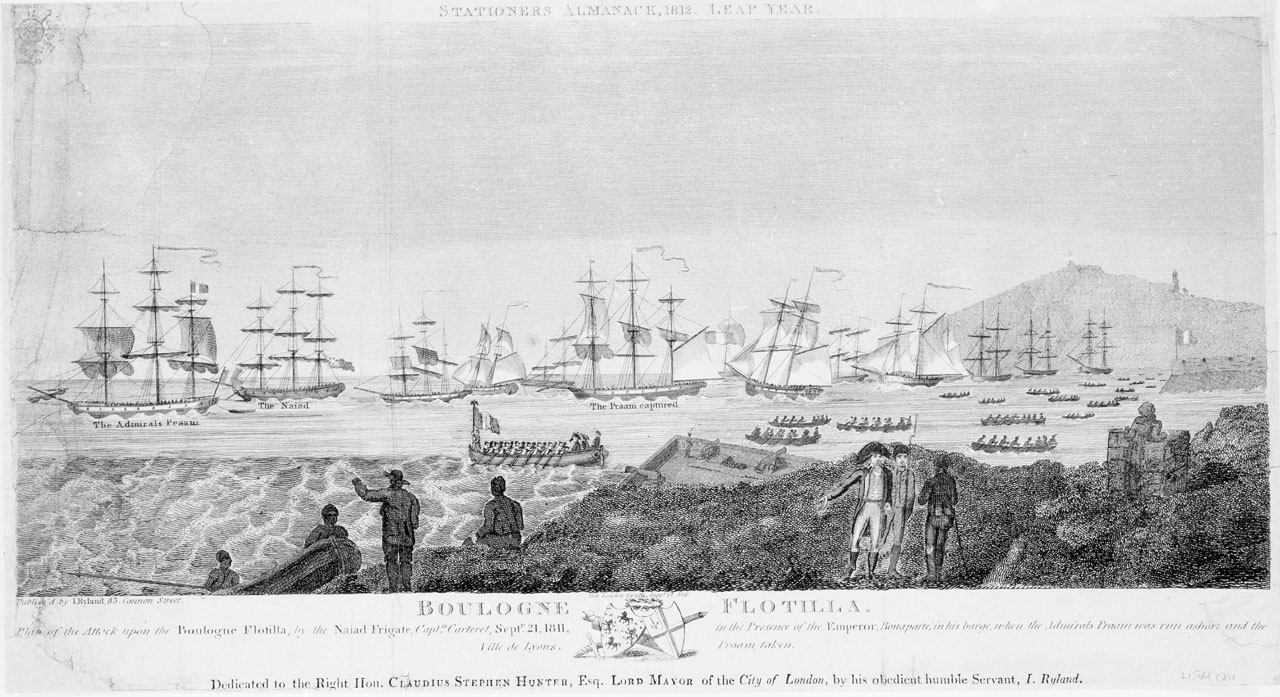
Engagement with the Boulogne flotilla on 21 September 1811

On 20 September, Napoleon arrived to inspect his invasion fleet and, on learning that HMS Naiad was lying off the coast, ordered Rear Admiral Baste to take a division of 12-gun prames, a bomb vessel and ten 4-gun brigs, and attack her. Naiad, anchored with springs, (Note: A spring was a second rope attached to the anchor cable so that by pulling on it, the ship could be slewed round contrary to wind and tide, which would otherwise determine the angle of the vessel.) forced the French to retreat beneath the shore batteries after an hour-and-a-half-long engagement at distance.

The following day, the prames were again sent out with 15 smaller vessels but by then, Naiad had been reinforced by Rinaldo and Redpole, the 18-gun HMS Castilian and 8-gun HMS Viper. Baste only just managed to avoid being captured, and the 12-gun Ville de Lyon, in attempting to rescue his prame, was badly damaged by Rinaldo and Redpole, then boarded and captured by men from the Naiad. The British ships withdrew when the battle drifted within range of the French batteries.

At the beginning of 1812, Rinaldo was under Commander William G Parker but by April he had been replaced by Commander Edmund Lyons. She was cruising off Etaples on 4 May 1812 when, with the assistance of Castilian, the Cherokee-class Bermuda and Phipps, she recaptured the 14-gun Apelles. The French had taken Apelles the previous day, and her British captain and a number of her crew were still aboard. After driving her ashore, the French refloated her, but after being chased by Bermuda and Rinaldo, found themselves on the beach again. When Castilian and Phipps turned up, the French abandoned Apelles, and boats from Bermuda were sent to secure her from under the shore batteries.

In 1814, Rinaldo assisted in Thomas Graham's operations in the Low Countries, in support of an insurrection in French-held Netherlands. Troops from the 30th and 81st regiments of foot, having arrived from Guernsey at Portsmouth on 19 January, boarded transports at Spithead and, accompanied by Rinaldo, sailed on 22 January. Having spent six days beating up the Channel in contrary winds, most of the convoy was forced to anchor at the Downs on 28 January. Two of the transports had separated in the storm; one arrived at the destination four days later than the rest, and the other put into Ramsgate. This vessel had been so badly damaged, the troops were forced to debark to another ship before rejoining Rinaldo. The convoy eventually reached Helvoet Sluys on 10 February.

== Later career and fate ==
Rinaldo sailed for the West Indies in June 1814 under a new commander, Archibald Tisdale, and served for a while on the Jamaica Station. In July 1815 she was under Commander Thomas Wren Carter. By October, she was laid-up at Sheerness. In March 1819 she underwent repairs at Chatham and was fitted for ordinary; the works took until May 1820 and cost £5,396.

Between November 1823 and February 1824, Rinaldo was refitted as a packet boat at a cost of £9,099. She was recommissioned under Lieutenant John Moore for service on the Falmouth Packet Station.

Rinaldo paid off in August 1834 and sold at Plymouth on 6 August 1835 for £610.
