= HMS Phipps =

Brig-sloop of the Royal Navy

History

Kingdom of Holland
- Name: Two Lydias
- Launched: 1807
- Captured: 1808

United Kingdom
- Name: HMS Phipps
- Acquired: 1808 by capture
- Fate: Broken up 1812

General characteristics
- Class & type: 14-gun schooner
- Tons burthen: 212 (bm)
- Sail plan: Schooner
- Armament: 14 guns

HMS Phipps was the Dutch privateer Two Lydias, launched in 1807, that the British Royal Navy captured in 1808 and took into service as HMS Phipps. Phipps captured two privateers, took part in a notable action, and her crew was subjected to mercury poisoning. She was sold for breaking up in 1812.

== Career ==
Commander Christopher Bell commissioned Phipps in Jamaica in January 1808. On 12 April, Phipps captured Heywood. Phipps sent Heywood, M'Intosh, master, who had been sailing to Liverpool from Haiti, into Jamaica. On 15 June Phipps captured Rolla, Thompson, master, which had been sailing from Malta to Haiti, and sent her into Jamaica, where she arrived on 19 June. On 19 June Phipps captured the American vessel Alert, Davidson, master, which had been sailing from Cuba to Alexandria, and sent her too into Jamaica.

Phipps arrived at Portsmouth on 10 October. There she was coppered and fitted.

On 4 February 1809, Phipps returned to Portsmouth after a gale dismasted her while she was escorting a convoy from Cork to the West Indies. Between February and May 1809 Phipps was converted from a schooner to a sloop. Then on 19 May she sailed for Portugal.

On 31 January 1810 Phipps was at Falmouth, having brought mail from Lisbon. On 4 March 1810 she was off Cadiz when a storm damaged a number of Spanish and French vessels. Phipps and the 74-gun third-rate Triumph captured the Spanish vessel Purisima Concepcion, which had been wrecked on the tidal flats of the San Pietro River. She was carrying quicksilver, 130 tons of which the British removed and stored aboard the two vessels. The quicksilver was in kidskin bladders, which started leaking, either because of water damage or attempts by the crew to steal what they thought was silver. As a result, mercury vapor proceeded to disseminate throughout both vessels, causing extensive mercury poisoning among the crew, and killing animals aboard the vessels. Both went to Gibraltar where they underwent cleaning. In the case of the Phipps, the cleaning included boring a hole through the bottom of her hull to let the quicksilver drain out.

Just before midnight on 15 November 1810 Bell chased a French privateer lugger so close inshore off Calais that, after firing some grape-shot into her, he had to let her go. However, having previously noticed two other luggers to windward and decided to try to come up on them unnoticed by beating along the shore. The pilot, Mr Richard Sickett, undertook the task and by about 5 o'clock in the morning Phipps was close enough to start an action with one of the luggers. For a quarter of an hour the lugger's crew fired small arms at Phipps and tried to run her ashore. Bell decided that as the water was only three and a half fathoms deep, the only way to capture the lugger was by boarding. Lieutenant Robert Tryon led the boarding party. The lugger surrendered after a few minutes of fighting during which a seaman was killed and Tryon was dangerously wounded. Tyson died eight weeks later in London of complications from his wounds, which were the result of his being hit by a cannonball accidentally discharged from Phipps.

The French lost six men killed and eleven wounded out of a crew of sixty. The lugger's captain, Francois Brunet, was wounded, as were all but one of her other officers. The lugger was the 16-gun Barbier de Seville. She was a brand new vessel that had left Boulogne two days previously.

At daylight Zephyr, Commander Francis George Dickins, came up. Zephyr assisted with the removal of the prisoners. Phipps then took Barbier de Seville in tow. Unfortunately, the lugger had taken shots between wind and water. These let in water, causing her to founder; in doing so the lugger took a seaman of the prize crew with her.

Goddard Blennerhassett was appointed to Phipps in December. However, he took command of Challenger. In January, Commander Westby Perceval took command of Phipps.

On 2 March 1811, the master of the ship Mercury wrote a letter to the newspaper The Pilot that on 28 February his ship had fought off three French privateers near Dungeness. Bell wrote a letter to the newspaper, and reprinted in the Naval Chronicle, that the supposedly French privateers vessels involved were Phipps and the cutter Dwarf, and that the master had continued firing even after the British vessels had identified themselves. The fire from Mercury had wounded the sergeant of marines on Phipps. The only shots the naval vessels had fired were two musket shots to get Mercury to stop, and the only reason that the naval vessels had not fired their guns was because of the chance that Mercury was a British ship. Bell admonished all merchant captains to be a little more circumspect in the future.

In the summer of 1811 Commander Thomas Wells was appointed to command Phipps. On 11 March 1812 Phipps captured the French privateer lugger Cerf by boarding. Cerf was armed with five guns and eight swivel guns, and had a crew of 31 men. Cerf resisted before surrendering with the result that she sustained two men seriously wounded, while Phipps had three men wounded.

Some two months later, Skylark and Apelles were blockading the French coast between Cape Gris Nez and Étaples when at 3am or so on the morning of 3 May a thick fog descended. Both grounded. All efforts to free them failed and in the morning shore batteries started firing on them as French troops started to gather. Her crew set fire to Skylark as they left.

The French captured Apelles, and her captain and a small number of her crew who were still aboard. The French succeeded in refloating Apelles, however the next day Bermuda and Rinaldo arrived and were able to drive Apelles on shore again. Then Castillian and Phipps arrived. Gunfire from the British squadron drove the French off, permitting boats from Bermuda to recapture Apelles. The British brought Apelles into the Downs on 5 May, together with the entire crew of Skylark and all but Captain Hoffman of Apelles, and 12 of his crew, or 19.

== Fate ==
Phipps was paid off at Sheerness in December 1812 and later broken up.
