= John (1809 ship) =

UK merchant ship, convict transport, and migrant ship 1809–1855

History

United Kingdom
- Name: John
- Launched: 1809 (or 1810), Chester (Note: Hackman says 1809 and Bateson says 1810. Both agree that she was built in Chester and had a burthen of 464 tons. Her master received a letter of marque in 1809.)
- Fate: Wrecked 4 May 1855

General characteristics
- Tons burthen: 464, or 465 (bm)
- Complement: 1809: 40; 1812: 40; 1813: 50
- Armament: 1809: 20 × 9&12-pounder cannons; 1811: 20 × 12-pounder carronades; 1812: 20 × 24&12&9-pounder cannons; 1813: 22 × 18&9-pounder cannons

John was launched at Chester in 1809 as a West Indiaman. Between 1827 and 1833 she made three voyages to New South Wales and two to Van Diemen's Land transporting convicts. Thereafter she traded between the United Kingdom and North America. She was wrecked in May 1855 with heavy loss of life while carrying migrants from Plymouth to Quebec.

== Career ==
John first appeared in Lloyd's Register (LR), in 1809. Captain Thomas Woodhouse acquired a letter of marque on 11 July 1809.

Year	Master	Owner	Trade	Source
1809	Woodhouse	Hind & Co.	Liverpool–Jamaica	LR
1811	Woodhouse; Popplewell	Hind & Co.	Liverpool–Jamaica	LR
1813	Popplewell; Cuthbertson	H.Wilson	Liverpool–Jamaica	LR

On 1 February 1812 Captain Robert Currie acquired a letter of credit. Though he did not appear in Lloyd's Register as a master of John, he did appear as here master on a voyage. Captain Alexander Cuthbertson acquired a letter of marque on 8 January 1813.

Year	Master	Owner	Trade	Source
1814	Popplewell; Dawes	H.Wilson	Liverpool–Jamaica	LR
1815	Popplewell	H.Wilson	Liverpool–Jamaica	LR

On 25 January 1819 John, Popplewell, master, was at Deal. The eastward-bound fleet had had to put back. There John, which was on her way to Madeira and Jamaica, and the southern whale fishery whaler Lyra ran into each other and both sustained damage.

On 14 August 1820 John, Popplewell, master, was returning to London from Jamaica when at 35°50′N 63°10′W she encountered a storm. Though she prepared to weather the storm, it still cost her masts and rigging and for four hours pushed her on her side.

Year	Master	Owner	Trade	Source & notes
1827	Popplewell; Moncrief	H.Wilson	Liverpool–Madeira	LR; large repair 1817 & small repairs 1827
1828	Moncrief	Moates & Co.	London–New South Wales	LR; large repair 1817 & small repairs 1827

1st convict voyage to New South Wales (1827): Captain William John Moncrief sailed from London on 22 July 1827. John arrived at Sydney on 25 November 1827. On the voyage James McKerrow, her surgeon, committed suicide on 16 October by jumping overboard. She had embarked 198 male convicts and arrived with 195, having suffered three convict deaths en route. A detachment from the 40th Regiment of Foot, under the command of Lieutenant James Stopford. An obituary of Lieutenant-Colonel Stopford reported that on the journey to Australia he had suppressed a mutiny by the convicts by having his soldiers fire on them, killing and wounding several. However, the data on deaths en route does not corroborate this story. Contemporary newspaper accounts of John's arrival also make no mention of any mutiny. John, Moncrief, master, sailed from Sydney circa May 1828 and arrived at Portsmouth on 30 November from Batavia.

Year	Master	Owner	Trade	Source & notes
1830	Norsworthy	Moates & Co.	London–New South Wales	LR; small repair 1827 & large repair 1829

2nd convict voyage to New South Wales (1829): Captain Robert Norsworthy sailed from Sheerness on 27 May 1829. she arrived at Sydney on 13 September. She had embarked 188 male convicts and suffered no convict deaths en route. She sailed for England via Manila.

1st convict voyage to Van Diemen's Land (1830–1831): Captain Norsworthy sailed from London on 14 October 1830. John arrived at Hobart on 28 January 1831. She had embarked 200 male convicts and had suffered no convict deaths on her voyage.

3rd convict voyage to New South Wales (1832): Captain Samuel J. Lowe sailed from London on 7 February 1832. John arrived at Sydney on 8 June 1832. She had embarked 200 male convicts and suffered two convict deaths on her voyage.

2nd convict voyage to Van Diemen's Land (1833): Captain Lowe sailed from Spithead on 6 August 1833. John arrived at Hobart on 1 December. She had embarked 260 male convicts and had suffered three convict deaths on her voyage. She sailed in July and arrived back in London on 23 November.

Year	Master	Owner	Trade	Source & notes
1834	S.J.Lowe; White	Ellerby	London–Sydney	LR; small repair 1827 & large repair 1829
1836	White; J.Whyte	Ellerby	London–Sydney; Liverpool–Sydney	LR; large repair 1839 & damages repaired 1837
1839	Carling	Salmon & Co., Bristol	London–Quebec; Bristol–America	LR; large repair 1839 & damages repaired 1837
1840	Carling	Salmon & Co., Bristol	Bristol–America; Bristol–New York	LR; large repair 1839 & damages repaired 1837
1844	Carling; Leighton	Salmon & Co., Bristol	Bristol–New York>br/>Bristol–Bermuda	LR; large repair 1839 & damages repaired 1837
1846	Leighton; Hutchins	Salmon & Co. T.Evans, Bideford	Bristol–Bermuda; Bideford–N.America	LR; repair 1833 & large repair 1847
1848	Hutchins	T.Evans, Bideford	Bristol–West Indies; Bristol–Quebec	LR; repair 1833 & large repair 1847
1850	Simmons	Rawle & Co., Plymouth	Plymouth–New York	LR; repair 1833 & large repair 1847
1854	Rawle	Rawle & Co., Plymouth	Plymouth–New York	LR; large repair 1847 & small repairs 1853 & 1854

== Fate ==
John struck The Manacles on 4 May 1855. She consequently sank in Godrevy Cove, Cornwall with the loss of 194 lives. Her crew and about 60 passengers were rescued. She was on a voyage carrying migrants from Plymouth to Quebec City.
