= Ned (1812 ship) =

History

United States
- Name: Price
- Owner: 1812:James and William Bosley; 1813:James and William Bosley, John J. Palmer, and J. K. Hamilton
- Builder: Dorchester County, Maryland
- Launched: 1812
- Captured: September 1813

General characteristics
- Tons burthen: 278 (bm)
- Length: 102 ft 6 in (31.2 m)
- Beam: 25 ft 0 in (7.6 m)
- Sail plan: Schooner
- Complement: 40
- Armament: 5 × 6-pounder guns

Ned was a schooner launched in Maryland in 1812. She sailed as a letter of marque and took one prize in a single-ship action. The Royal Navy captured her in July 1813.

== Career ==
Captain Joseph Dawson commissioned Ned as a letter of marque on 10 October 1812. He then sailed for France. Ned was returning to the United States when she encountered Malvina, of 10 guns, T. Smith, master at 44°54′N 15°0′W as Malvina was returning to London from the Mediterranean. After an action of 50 minutes Malvina struck. Captain Smith, of Malvina was killed; Ned had seven men wounded. Ned arrived back at Baltimore on 26 April 1813. Malvina reached Ocracoke, or Wilmington, North Carolina. Captain William Hackett commissioned Ned on 29 July 1813 at New York. He then sailed for France.

== Fate ==
HMS Royalist captured Ned on 6/7 September 1813 off Arcasson after having chased her for four days. Captain James John Gordon Bremer described his prize as "a very fine copper-bottomed schooner, of two hundred and eighty tons, pierced for sixteen, and mounting six guns, and having forty-five men on board." On 21 September Lloyd's List reported that Ned, Hatchet, master, sailing from New York to Bordeaux, and prize to Royalist, had come into Plymouth. A second report stated that Ned had arrived at Plymouth on 19 September. She had originally left New York on 1 August to avoid an expected American Government embargo on US ports.
