= HMS Zephyr (1809) =

Naval brig (1809-1818)

History

United Kingdom
- Name: HMS Zephyr
- Ordered: 9 June 1808
- Builder: Portsmouth Dockyard (M/s Nicholas Diddams)
- Laid down: October 1808
- Launched: 24 September 1809
- Fate: Sold 29 January 1818

General characteristics
- Class & type: Crocus-class brig-sloop
- Type: Brig-sloop
- Tons burthen: 2536/94 (bm)
- Length: Overall: 92 ft 5 in (28.2 m); Keel: 73 ft 2 in (22.3 m)
- Beam: 25 ft 6 in (7.8 m)
- Depth of hold: 12 ft 9 in (3.9 m)
- Sail plan: Brig rigged
- Complement: 86
- Armament: 2 × 6-pounder bow chasers + 12 × 24-pounder carronades

HMS Zephyr was a 14-gun Crocus-class brig of the Royal Navy built by Nicholas Diddams at Portsmouth Dockyard and launched there in 1809. During her service she captured two armed vessels. The Navy sold her in 1818 for breaking up.

== Career ==
Commander Francis George Dickins, commissioned Zephyr for the Downs and Channel station in June 1809.

Shortly after midnight on 15 November 1810 HMS Phipps captured the French privateer lugger Barbier de Seville. At daylight Zephyr, came up. Zephyr assisted with the removal of the prisoners.

Zephyr was in sight on 3 February 1811 when HMS Royalist and Castilian captured the privateer lugger Braconnier. (Note: Braconnier, from Saint-Valery-en-Caux, was commissioned in January 1810 by Frédéric Follin with 50 men.)

On 8 February 1811 Zephyr captured the French lugger privateer Victoire, of 16 guns and 68 men. Lloyd's List reported Victoire of 16 guns and 80 men, was from Dieppe, and that Zephyr had taken her into the Downs. Victoire had captured Mary, which had been returning to London from Surinam prior to herself being captured. (Note: Victoire may have been a privateer from Saint-Valery-en-Caux (20 miles (32 km) west of Dieppe), commissioned in February 1810 under a captain Molleghem. Victoire did another cruise in 1810 under captain Piquendaire with 50 men, and two more between 1810 and 1811 under an unknown captain.)

Commander Thomas Cuthbert Hichens was appointed to command of Zephyr on 3 August 1811. On 10 December 1812 Zephyr captured the United States letter of marque schooner Antelope, of 10 guns and 32 men. Antelope had been bound to Bordeaux with a cargo from New York. Antelope arrived at Falmouth on 19 December.

Commander Hichens was promoted to post captain in 7 June 1814. Captain Richard Creyke recommissioned Zephyr in July on the Portsmouth station. He was promoted to post captain on 19 December.

Commander George F. Rich recommissioned her in December. He sailed Zephyr to Saint Helena. She returned to Plymouth on 28 September. She was paid off in June 1816.

Commander John Cook Carpenter commanded Zephyrin 1817.

== Fate ==
The "Principal Officers and Commissioners of His Majesty's Navy" offered Zephyr for sale on 5 June 1817 at Plymouth. She finally sold on 29 January 1818 to Thomas Pitman. for £820 for breaking up.
