= Grecian (1824 ship) =

1824 English brig

Coordinates: 33°02′29″S 151°40′54″E

History

Tasmania
- Name: Grecian
- Namesake: Grecian
- Owner: J. & W. Young & J. Grant, Hobart
- Launched: 1824
- Identification: Hobart Registration No: 9/1859
- Fate: Wrecked in 1864

General characteristics
- Class & type: Brig
- Tonnage: 209 gross tons
- Length: 91 feet (28 m)
- Beam: 27.85 feet (8.49 m)
- Depth: 6.1 feet (1.9 m)

Grecian was a sailing ship built in England in 1824. The vessel was taken to Australia where she served as a whaler. Based in Hobart, she made 19 whaling voyages between 1843 and 1865.

She was wrecked on Nine Mile Beach, New South Wales during a gale on 30 April 1864. Captain Grant lost his life.
