= Wolf Rock, Lord Howe Island =

Submerged rock in the Tasman sea

Coordinates: 31.557851°S 159.121350°E

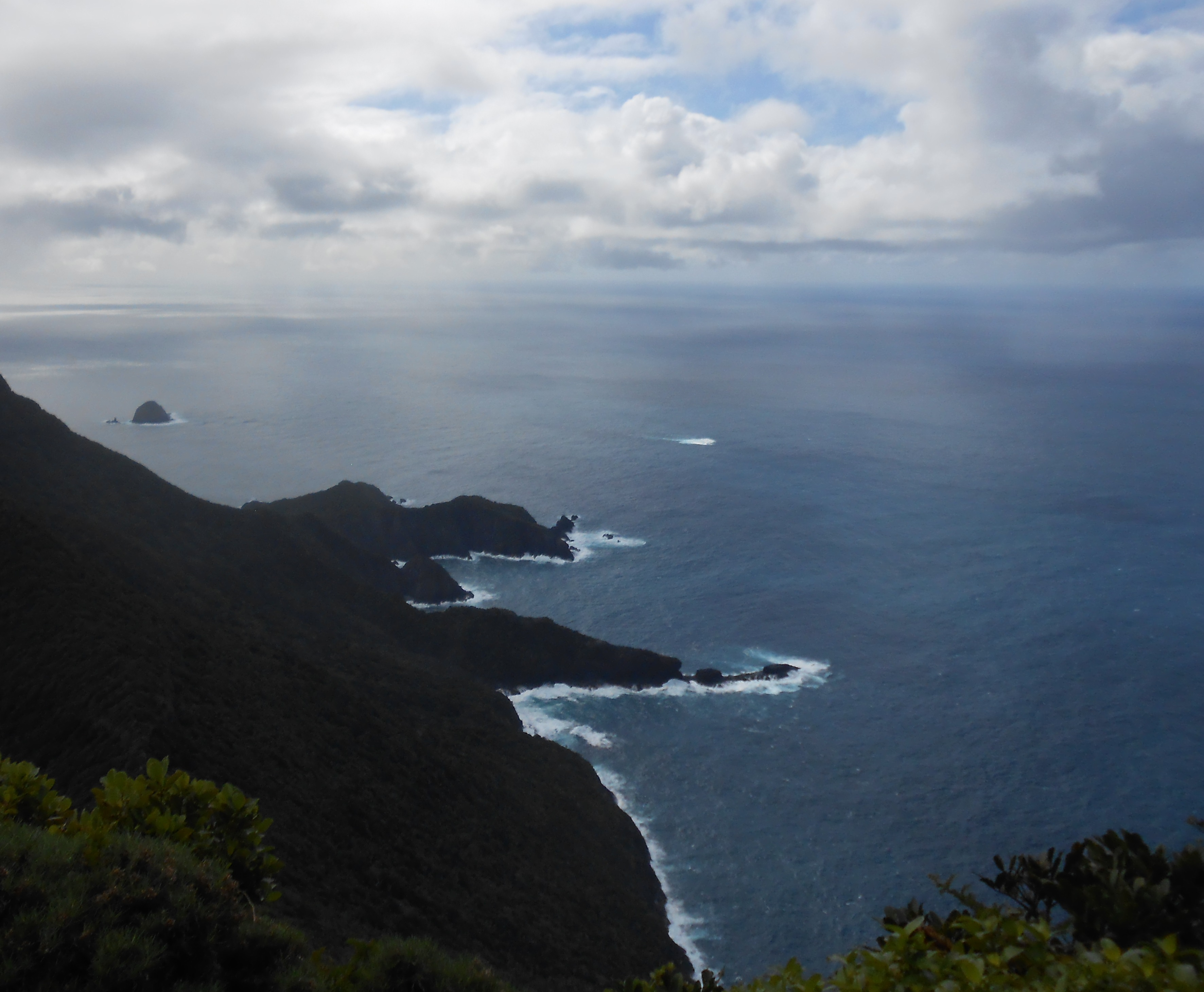
Wolf Rock - East of Lord Howe Island (white foam patch near center of the photo)

Wolf Rock, or sometimes spelt Wolfe Rock in the past, is a submerged rock and reef east of Lord Howe Island. At low tide, it is 9 feet above the water.

The rock is named after the Wolf, an ex-Royal Navy gun brig built in 1814, which was working as a whaling ship when on 6 August 1837 it struck an outer reef near Lord Howe Island. She escaped the reef and was thought to be undamaged, but the vessel sank in deep water about 10 miles off the island, taking with it a valuable cargo of sperm whale oil. In 2002 the Royal Navy destroyer HMS Nottingham struck the rock itself just after manoeuvres to airlift a sick crewman onto Lord Howe Island, causing the ship to nearly sink from resulting serious hull damage to the underwater forward sections and stabilisers.
