= HMS Lyra (1808) =

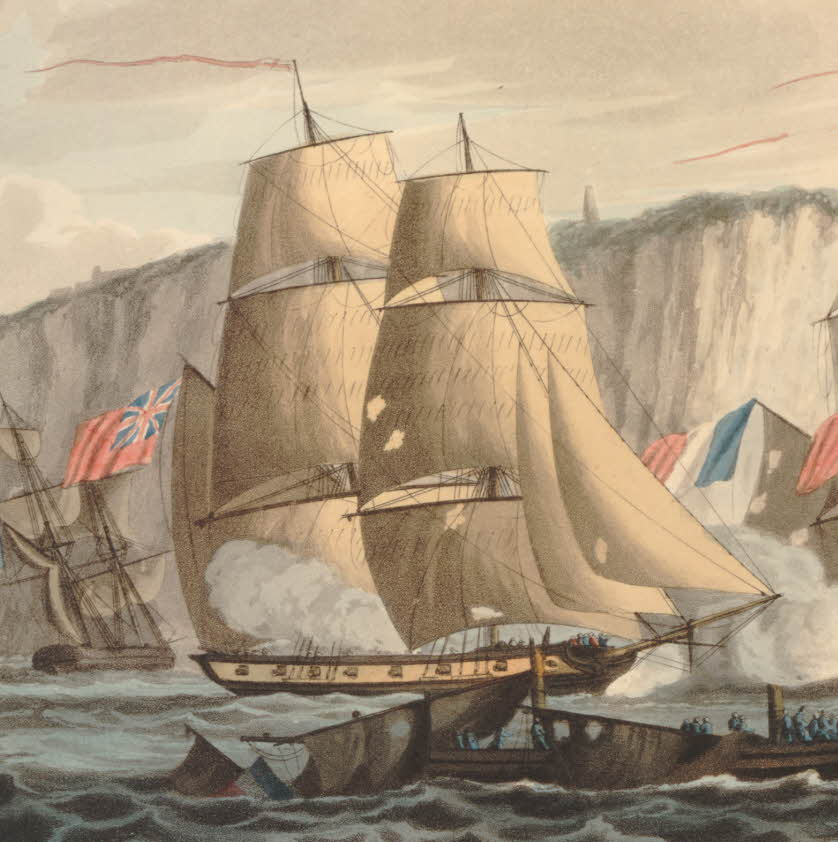
- HMS Rosario, Lyra' sister ship

United Kingdom
- Name: HMS Lyra
- Namesake: Lyra
- Ordered: 31 December 1807
- Builder: John Dudman, Deptford
- Laid down: May 1808
- Launched: 22 August 1808
- Completed: By 21 June 1810
- Honours and awards: Naval General Service Medal with clasp "Basque Roads"
- Fate: Sold July 1818

United Kingdom
- Name: Lyra
- Owner: Samuel Enderby & Sons
- Acquired: 1818 by purchase
- Fate: Last listed in 1833

General characteristics
- Class & type: Cherokee-class brig-sloop
- Tons burthen: 231, or 23988/94 (bm)
- Length: Overall: 90 ft 6 5/8 in (27.6 m); Keel: 74 ft 1 5/8 in (22.6 m)
- Beam: 23 ft 0 in (7.0 m)
- Depth of hold: 10 ft 1 in (3.1 m)
- Propulsion: Sails
- Sail plan: Brig
- Complement: 75
- Armament: 10 × 18-pounder carronades + 2 × 6-pounder chase guns

HMS Lyra was a Cherokee-class brig-sloop launched at Deptford in 1808 for the Royal Navy. In 1809 she was one of the vessels that participated in the Battle of Basque Roads. Thereafter, she captured numerous small prizes. Between 1812 and 1814 she served off the Spanish coast. In 1816 Lyra sailed to China as escort to a diplomatic mission. The Navy sold her in 1818. She then became a whaler. Between 1819 and 1833 she made five voyages in the southern whale fishery. She was last listed in 1833.

== Royal Navy ==
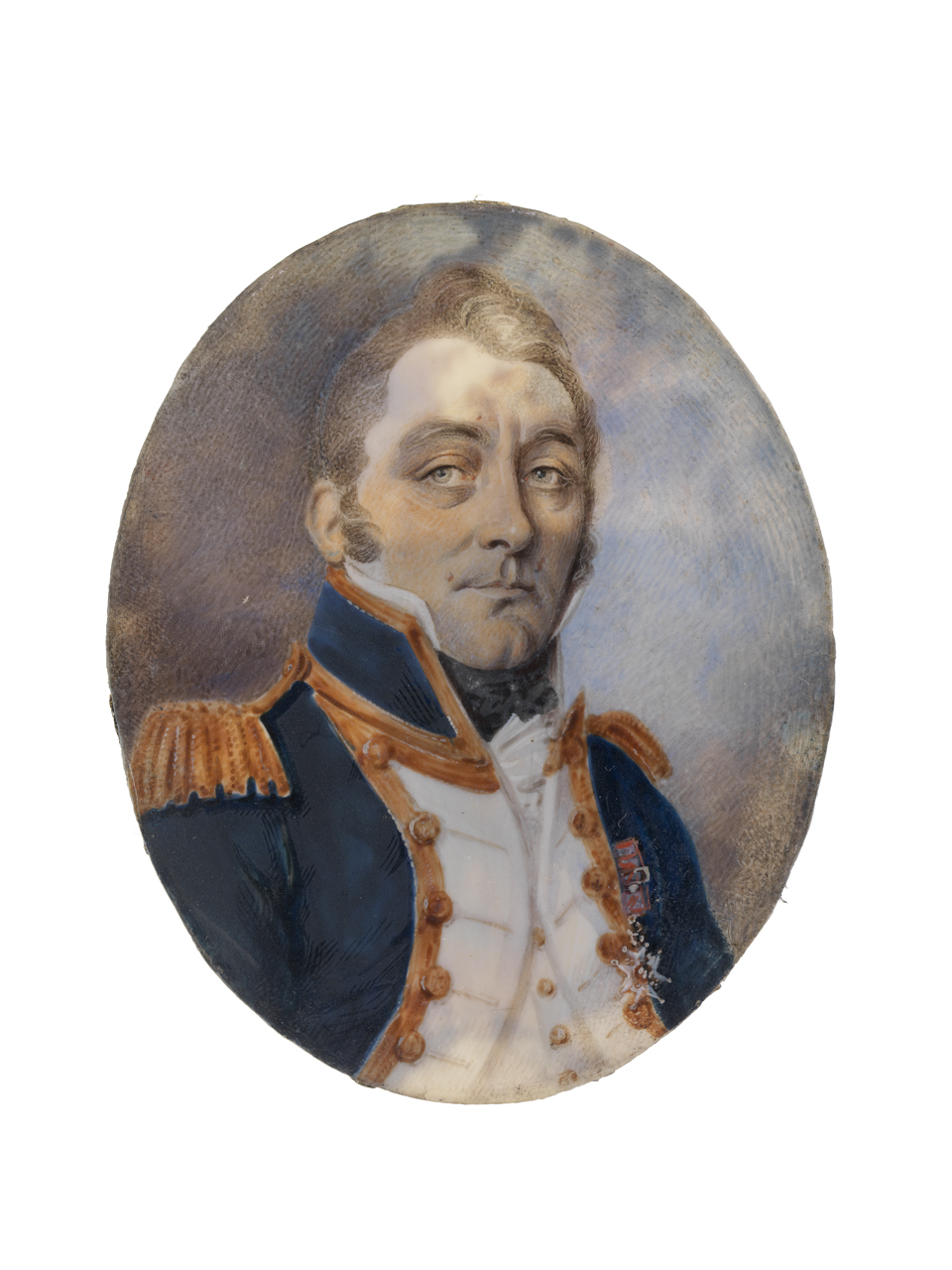
Robert Bloye, Lyra's captain from 1810 to 1813

Commander William Bevians commissioned Lyra in September 1808 for the Channel. Under his command she participated in the battle on 11 April 1809 at the Battle of Basque Roads. Lyra was attached to the fleet under Lord Gambier. On the day after the battle, two luggers captured one of her boats which was engaged in burning the enemy’s ships. The lieutenant commanding the boat and his men remained prisoners of war until the end of the war. In January 1810, Commander Robert Bloye took command of Lyra. Lyra and Amethyst shared in the prize money for the capture on 7 August 1810 of Marie Ange and Marie Louise. They also shared in the prize money for the capture on 4 September of Dolphina. Lyra shared with Pioneer and Constant in the proceeds from the capture on 14 October of Delphina.

On 28 January 1811 HMS Dryad captured the American ship Matilda, in sight of Indefatigable and Lyra. Lyra and Cadmus shared in the prize money for Adolphus, captured 17 February 1811. On 27 May 1811 Lyra captured Fox. In 1812 and 1813 Lyra operated on Spain's northern coast. From May 1812 Lyra was part of a squadron under the command of Captain George Collier in Surveillante, employed off the coast of northern Spain assisting the operations of Spanish partisans. On 17 June HMS Medusa joined Hotspur, Rover, Venerable, Rhin and Lyra off Santoña, and made contact with the guerilla chief Don Gaspar, who arranged an attack on the town and the fort of Lequietio, 12 miles (19 km) to the east. Marines were landed to reinforce the guerillas, and Captain Bouverie supervised the landing of a gun, which made a breach in the fort's wall allowing it to be captured.

In July 1812 Lyra was part of a squadron assisting Spanish guerillas under Colonel Longa. On the 11th, Captain Bloye landed with a party of marines, and knocked the trunions off the guns in the Bagona battery, and destroyed one mounted on a height. Lyra captured the American schooner Enterprise, of 126 tons and eight men on 12 March 1813. Enterprise was sailing from Boston to Bayoririe with a cargo of fish. Then on 20 March, Lyra captured the American schooner Gold Coiner, of 200 tons and 15 men. Gold Coiner was sailing from New York to Bordeaux with a cargo of cotton, potash, and fish. (Note: Gold Coiner, of 15462/95 tons (bm), with a length of 79 ft 6 in (24.2 m), had been launched in 1809 on the Connecticut River.) On 28 March 1813 HMS Medusa captured Ferox and her cargo. Lyra was in company.

On 27 April 1813 HMS Surveillante was involved in an action against the American 6-gun letter of marque Tom. Collier wrote, on 27 April, that he had captured Tom "after a smart chase; she was from Charlestown, bound to Nantz; she is a remarkably fine vessel for her class, and, from her superior sailing, had already escaped eighteen of His Majesty's cruizers." Surveillante was accompanied by Lyra. On 29 May, Lyra captured Hannah Eliza. Commander Bloye was promoted to post captain on 23 September 1813. Commander Dowell O'Reilly replaced him. On 5 December Lyra and Iris captured the schooner Mariner, of 83 tons (bm) and six men. Mariner was on her way from Boston to Bayonne with a cargo of salt fish.

By 20 February 1814, General Wellington, advancing from Spain, had reached the Adour some 10 miles north of Biaritz. O'Reilly commanded a squadron consisting of Lyra, Woodlark, and Matial, was given the task of attempting to cross the bar. On the 23rd, O'Reilly took a Spanish, flat-bottomed boat, which overset. He and his men safely reached shore. The next day a pilot was landed to guide vessels through the bar. A number of boats made it through the bar, though Lyra's master's mate and five seamen drowned in the attempt. Eventually the boats and small vessels necessary to support the army succeeded in crossing the bar and sailing into the river. Captain Basil Hall was appointed to Lyra in October 1815. She underwent fitting in November–December for foreign service. Then on 9 February 1816 she accompanied Lord Amherst's expedition to China. Lyra arrived back in England in October 1817. Disposal: The "Principal Commissioners and Officers of His Majesty's Navy" offered the "Lyra brig, of 240 tons", lying at Portsmouth, for sale on 11 June 1818. Lyra was sold to Thomas Pitman at Portsmouth for £920 on 11 July 1818.

=== Post script ===
In January 1819, the London Gazette reported that Parliament had voted a grant to all those who had served under the command of Lord Viscount Keith in 1812, between 1812 and 1814, and in the Gironde. Lyra was listed among the vessels that had served under Keith in 1812, and 1813 and 1814. (Note: The money was paid in three tranches. For someone participating in the first through third tranches, a first-class share was worth £256 5s 9d; a sixth-class share was worth £4 6s 10d. For someone participating only in the second and third tranches a first-class share was worth £202 6s 8d; a sixth-class share was worth £5 0s 5d.) In 1847 the surviving members of the crews of all the British vessels at the Battle of Basque Roads qualified for the Naval General Service Medal with the clasp "Basque Roads 1809".

== Whaler ==
Samuel Enderby & Sons acquired Lyra. She first appeared in Lloyd's Register (LR) in the volume for 1818.

Year	Master	Owner	Trade	Source & notes
1818		Enderby	London–South Seas	LR; rebuilt 1818

1st whaling voyage (1819–1821): Captain Joseph Winslow (or Winston) sailed from England on 15 January 1819. On 24 January Lyra was at Deal. A gale came up and she parted her cables, as did John, Popplewell, master, and both vessels drove athwart of each other. Both sustained damage. Lyra was reported to be at Kema Roads, on Sulawesi, and at Morotai. She returned to England on 19 September 1821 with 550 casks of whale oil.

2nd whaling voyage (1822–1824): Captain John Smith sailed from London on 6 June 1822. Lyra was reported off Japan and at Morotai. She returned to England on 8 September 1824 with 550 casks of whale oil.

Circa 1824 Enderby sold Lyra to Daniel Bennett & Son.

3rd whaling voyage (1824–1827): Captain J. Renwick (or James Rennick), sailed from London on 2 November 1824. She was reported at Mauritius on her way from the South Seas. She arrived back at London on 27 March 1827 with 500 casks, plus one jaw, and whale teeth.

4th whaling voyage (1827–1829): Captain McLean sailed from London on 12 May 1827. Lyra was reported to be whaling off the Seychelles in September 1828. She returned to London on 20 October 1829.

5th whaling voyage (1830–1833): Captain J. Sullivan sailed from London on 6 April 1830. Lyra was reported whaling in the Japan grounds and in the Moluccas. She returned to London 14 June 1833.

== Fate ==
Lyra was last listed in the registers in 1833.
