= SS Grecian (1891) =

Steel bulk freighter wrecked in Lake Huron

- Grecian Shipwreck Site
- U.S. National Register of Historic Places
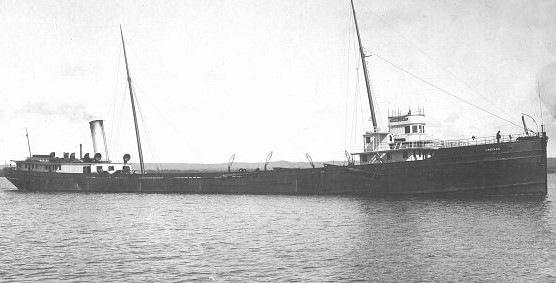
- Grecian underway

- Location within Michigan Location within the United States
- Location: Lake Huron
- Nearest city: Alpena, Michigan
- Coordinates: 44°58′7″N 83°12′3″W
- NRHP reference No.: 100001835
- Added to NRHP: February 8, 2018

Grecian was a steel bulk freighter built in 1891 by Globe Iron Works Company at Cleveland, Ohio. She was a sister ship to Norman, also wrecked nearby. The ship was 296 feet (90 m) long, with a beam of 40 feet (12 m) and a gross register tonnage of 2,348 tons.

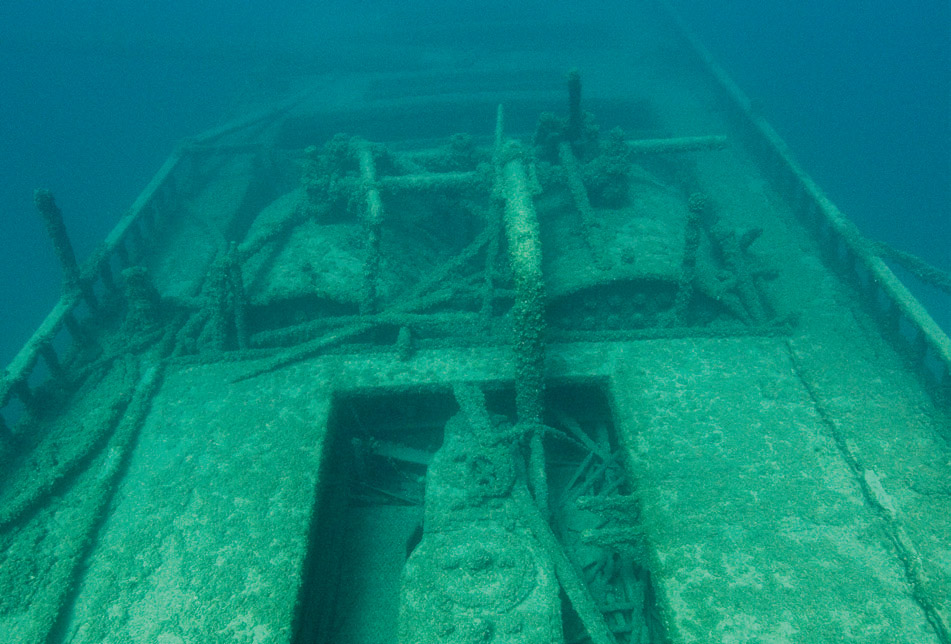
Grecian in shallower water with boiler deckhouse gone

== History ==
Grecian was built to carry iron ore for the Chapin Iron Mining Company, and ran between the company's docks in Escanaba, Michigan and Cleveland, Ohio. In 1896 made 35 trips through the Great Lakes, carrying 93,000 tons of iron ore. On June 7, 1906 the unladen Grecian struck a rock and sank in shallow water near De Tour Village in the St. Mary's River. The ship was refloated, and taken in tow by the steamer Sir Henry Bessemer, with the plan to take it to Detroit, Michigan for repairs. However, on June 15, it unexpectedly sank near Thunder Bay Island. The crew escaped in lifeboats. Salvage was attempted 1909 by the Staud Canalon Salvage Company, but to no avail.

== The wreck ==
The wreck of Grecian sits upright in 100 feet (30 m) of water. The bow and stern lie intact, with a collapsed midships portion. The engine, boiler, sections of the propeller, and the deck machinery all remain in place and are visible. There is also a steel canalon (a salvage lifting device) from the 1909 salvage attempt, which lies off the ship's stern. Most of movable artifacts previously aboard the ship have been taken by salvagers and recreational divers.
