= HMS Grecian (1814) =

American schooner

History

United States
- Name: Grecian
- Owner: Isaac McKim
- Builder: Thomas Kemp, Baltimore
- Launched: c.March 1812
- Captured: Captured on 2 May 1814

United Kingdom
- Name: HMS Grecian
- Acquired: Captured on 2 May 1814; Purchased 3 November 1815
- Fate: Sold 1822

United Kingdom
- Name: Grecian
- Owner: D. Holbrow (captain)
- Port of registry: London
- Acquired: 1823 by purchase
- Fate: Probably lost 1829; last listed 1830

General characteristics
- Tons burthen: 22432/94, or 226, or 229 bm
- Length: 95 ft 11 in (29.2 m) (overall); 74 ft 3 in (22.6 m) (keel)
- Beam: 23 ft (7.0 m)
- Depth of hold: 10 ft 5 in (3.2 m)
- Sail plan: schooner
- Complement: Grecian:24-27; HMS:50
- Armament: Grecian: 2 × 4-pounder + 2 × 6-pounder guns + 5 swivels; HMS: 8 × 18-pounder carronades + 2 × 6-pounder guns (Royal Navy)

Grecian was an American schooner launched in 1812. During the War of 1812 she received a letter of marque. The Royal Navy captured her on 5 February 1814 and took her into service as HMS Grecian. She was sold in 1822. In 1823 she became a merchantman. In 1824 the Chilean Navy captured her, but she escaped, and thereafter may have served for a time as a Spanish privateer. After the end of the Peruvian War of Independence she apparently returned to more conventional pursuits and was probably lost in 1829 though she was still listed in 1830 as sailing between London and Lima.

== American service ==
Thomas Kemp of Baltimore designed Grecian with several innovations. She was pierced for 20 guns, though she never carried that many, and her gunports were unique, designed perhaps to save weight. She had a long, curving stem, and a shallow, less convex bow.

Grecian's first captain was James Phillips, and under him she had made one voyage to France.

She received letter of marque No. 944 in December 1813, under Captain Knapp. She had not captured anything before the boats of HMS Jaseur cut her out under the guns of a battery field pieces on East River, in Chesapeake Bay on 2 May 1814. The British cutting out party under Lieutenant West, first lieutenant of Jaseur, rowed up silently in the night, drove Knapp and the seven members of the crew on watch below deck, fastened the hatches, cut her cables, and sailed off.

== Royal Navy service ==
The British commissioned her as HMS Grecian under the command of Lieutenant Henry Jewry.

After the end of the Napoleonic Wars, Grecian was deployed on anti-smuggling duties in the Channel. On 14 March 1816 Grecian captured the smuggling vessel Betsey. (Note: Jewry's first-class share of the proceeds was worth £60 8s 4d; a fifth-class share, that of a seaman, was worth 11s 4d.) Then a month later, on 18 April, Grecian was in company with the schooner HMS Rosario when they captured the smuggling vessel Nancy. (Note: Jewry's first-class share of the proceeds for 100 kegs of spirits and headmoney for the smuggler's five-man crew was worth £63 5s 8d; a fifth-class share, that of a seaman, was worth 13s 2d.)

In May, Grecian captured three smuggling vessels. Then on 11 and 20 May she captured Active and Market Maid, of Hastings. (Note: The first-class share of the proceeds for both vessels was worth £103 18s 0d; a fifth-class share was worth £1 3s 10d.) The last day of May saw Grecian capture Po. (Note: The first-class share of the proceeds was worth £95 3s 6d; a fifth-class share was worth 19s 10d.) On 30 July Grecian captured Ox, followed on 26 August with the capture of the Three Sisters. Lastly, on 6 December Grecian retrieved 84 kegs of contraband spirits from the sea. (Note: The first class shares, i.e., Jewry's shares of the prize money for these three seizures, were worth £40 13s 6d, £61 8s 10d, and £17 11s 6d. The sixth-class shares, those of an ordinary seaman, were worth 19s, £1 8s 9d, and 8s 1 1/2d.)

On 3 May 1818 Grecian captured the smuggling lugger Fly. (Note: The first-class share was worth £91 6s 0d; a sixth-class share was worth £2 1s 2d.)

On 18 August 1818 Lieutenant Nathaniel Martin was appointed captain of Grecian. Between 30 August 1819 and 20 January 1820, Grecian made several small captures. (Note: The first-class share was worth £28 7s 10 1/2d; a sixth-class share was worth 13s 3d.) Grecian made further sundry small captures on 16 May 1820, 27 March 1821, 20 April, 6 May, and 2 August. (Note: The first-class share was worth £19 1s 4 1/2d; a sixth-class share was worth 8s 0 3/4d.)

== Disposal ==
She was paid off in 1821. The Admiralty put Grecian up for sale in April 1822 at Portsmouth. She was sold to Joshua Crystall for £510 on 18 April 1822.

== Merchantman ==
Grecian appeared in Lloyd's Register in 1823 with D. Holbrow, master and owner, and trade London-Lima. She then got caught up in the Peruvian War of Independence.

Grecian was one of the 16 vessels that HMS Fly got out from Callao and put under her protection on 26 February 1824.

A report dated 23 December 1824, reported that a Chilean Navy squadron captured Grecian as she attempted to return to Callao. Her crew recaptured Grecian and took her to Chiloe.

A report dated Lima 8 October 1825, reported that Grecian, having escaped from Admiral Martin Guise's squadron, had refitted in Chiloe. She then began cruising as a Spanish privateer between Lima and Guayaquil.

== Fate ==
Grecian was lost on the Triangles Reef before 3 July 1829. She was on a voyage from British Honduras to Campeche, Mexico.

Grecian was last listed in Lloyd's Register for 1830 with master D, Holbrow, master, and trade London-Lima.
