= Malvina (1810 ship) =

History

United Kingdom
- Name: Malvina
- Launched: 1810, or 1811, Aberdeen (Note: One source gives a build year of 1806. However, a website for ships built in Aberdeen gives her launch year as 1810.)
- Captured: March 1813

General characteristics
- Tons burthen: 203, or 204 (bm)
- Sail plan: Brig
- Complement: 30
- Armament: 4 × 4-pounder guns + 6 × 9-pounder carronades

Malvina was launched at Aberdeen in 1810. In 1811, she sailed to North America to acquire timber; on her way over she carried a small number of Scots emigrants. She returned to trading between the United Kingdom and the Mediterranean. A United States privateer captured her in March 1813.

== Career ==
Malvina originally traded between the United Kingdom and Cadiz, Oporto, and Teneriffe.

Malvina first appeared in Lloyd's Register (LR) in 1812. She also appeared in the Register of Shipping (RS).

The year 1811 saw a sizeable increase in Aberdeen's trading links with North America. Napoleon had blockaded the timber trade with the Baltic in 1807, forcing British vessels to seek elsewhere for timber. The timber importers succeeded in getting a doubling of the tariff on Baltic timber, making it uncompetitive with North America. Sizeable amounts of timber started to come from the Maritimes, and lesser amounts from the St Lawrence.

Scottish Customs Records show that when Malvina, and four other vessels sailed from Aberdeen in 1811, to collect timber from Canada, they carried a small number of passengers, in all about 100. The passengers that Malvina was carrying may have disembarked at Nova Scotia. (Note: At the time, Malvina was registered at the port of Aberdeen, as were the other four: Ploughman, Mary, Spring, and Centurion.),

Year	Master	Owner	Trade	Source & notes
1813	J.Smith	Captain & Co.	London–Gibraltar	LR

The U.S. privateer Ned was returning to the United States when in April 1813, she encountered Malvina, of 10 guns, John Smith, master, at 44°54′N 15°0′W as Malvina was returning to London from the Mediterranean with a cargo of wine and cork. After an action of 50 minutes Malvina struck. Captain Smith, of Malvina was killed; Ned had seven men wounded. The Americans put a prize crew, under a Mr. Penderson, aboard Malvina. She reached Ocracoke, or Wilmington, North Carolina. Niles Weekly Register merely recorded the capture, without specifying the captor or anything else.

The U.S. District Court for the Albemarle District condemned Malvina in prize to Ned.
