= HMS Rosario (1808) =

Brig-sloop of the Royal Navy

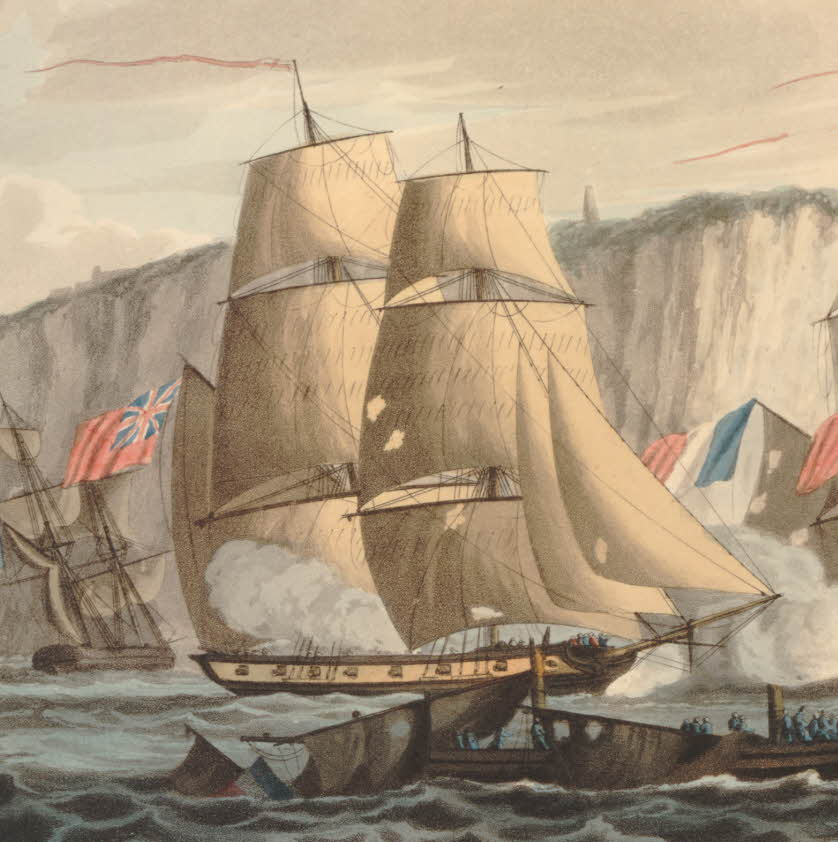
- Rosario

History

United Kingdom
- Name: HMS Rosario
- Ordered: 27 June 1808
- Launched: 7 December 1808
- Commissioned: March 1809
- Decommissioned: February 1822
- Honours and awards: Naval General Service Medal (NGSM) with clasp "Rosario 27 March 1812"
- Fate: Sold in 1832

General characteristics
- Class & type: Cherokee-class brig
- Tons burthen: 23614/94 (bm)
- Length: 90 ft 0 in (27.4 m) (gundeck); 73 ft 5 1/2 in (22.4 m) (gundeck)
- Beam: 24 ft 7 in (7.5 m)
- Draught: 9 ft 0 in (2.7 m) (laden); 6 ft 0 in (1.83 m) (unladen)
- Depth of hold: 11 ft 2 in (3.4 m)
- Sail plan: Brig
- Complement: 75 as a ship-of-war
- Armament: 8 × 18-pounder carronades + 2 × 6-pounder guns

HMS Rosario was a Cherokee-class 10-gun brig of the Royal Navy, launched in 1808. She served during the Napoleonic Wars and participated in one engagement that earned her crew the Naval General Service Medal (NGSM). She was sold in 1832.

== Napoleonic Wars ==
She was commissioned in March 1809, under commander Booty Harvey, for service in home waters. On 10 December 1810, she engaged two French privateers in the English Channel. To avoid being captured, Harvey ran alongside one of the luggers, which he boarded and captured. This was the lugger Mamelouck of 16 guns, under the command of Norbez Lawrence. The other lugger engaged Rosario on the starboard side but then was able to outrun Rosario, which had lost her jib-boom during the boarding, and escape. Mamelouck had seven of her crew of 45 men wounded. Rosario had five men wounded, two severely. Mamelouck was only nine hours out of Boulogne and had not had captured anything.

On 14 April 1811 Vroyd, Griffith, master, came into Ramsgate. Vroyd had been sailing from Carmarthen to London when the French privateer Aventure had captured her. Rosario had recaptured Vroyd and sent her into Ramsgate.

On 19 December 1811, Rosario was in company with HMS Skylark and HMS Royalist when Royalist captured the French privateer Rodeur, of 14 guns and 60 men, between Dover and Calais after a two-hour chase. In the engagement Royalist had one man killed and five wounded; Rodeur lost one man killed and 11 wounded.

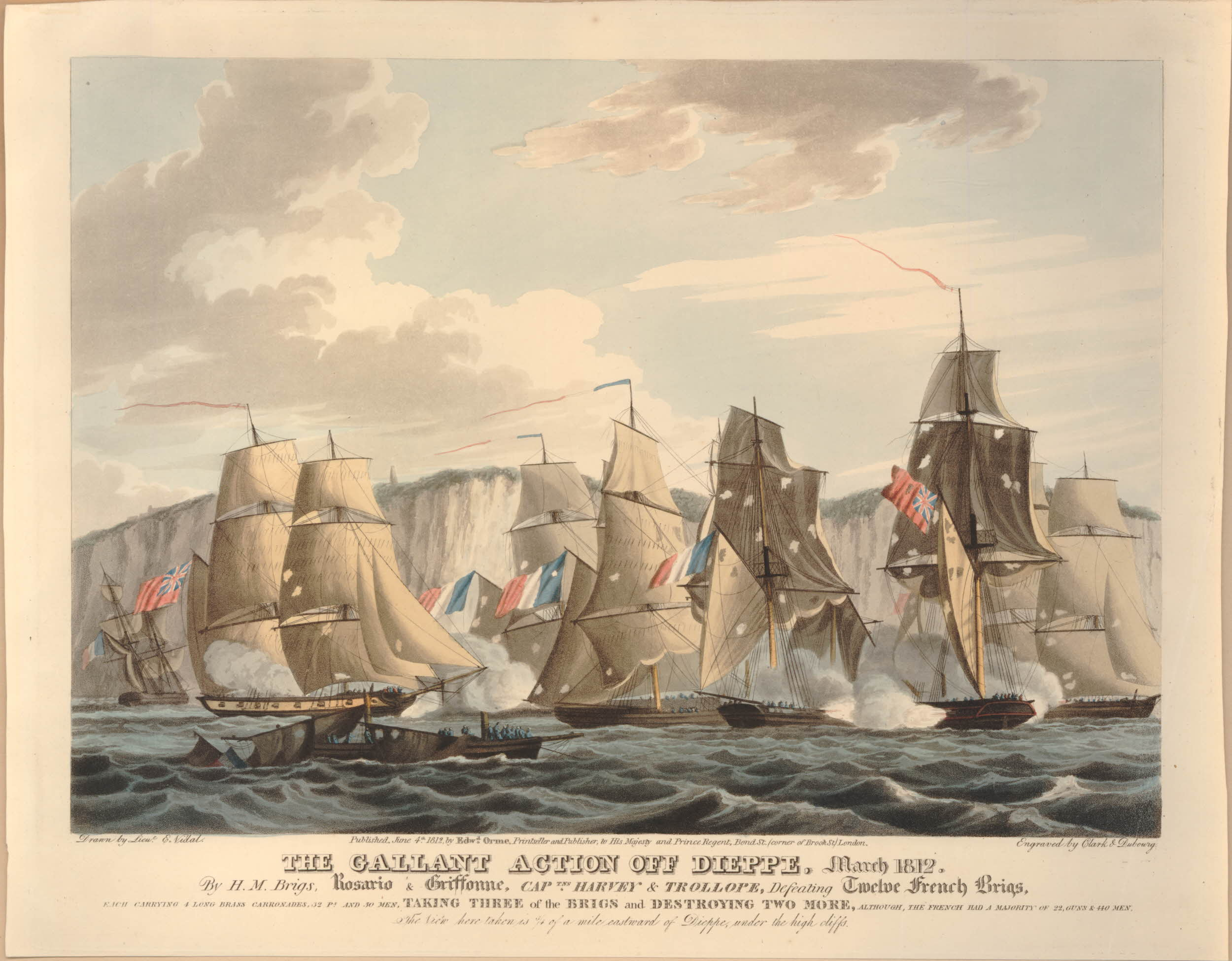
The gallant action off Dieppe, March 1812, by Emeric Essex Vidal

On 27 March 1812, near Dieppe, Rosario intercepted a 13-strong flotilla heading from Boulogne to Dieppe. With the aid of Griffon, she engaged them closely, capturing three brigs (praams Nos. 95, 246, and 314), and driving two more onto the shore. Each French brig was armed with three 24-pounder guns and an 8" howitzer. The British casualties amounted to an officer and four men wounded. On 31 March, as a result, Harvey was promoted to post-captain. In 1847, the Admiralty awarded the Naval General Service Medal with clasp "Rosario 27 March 1812" to the seven surviving claimants from her crew. The admiralty also awarded the medal with clasp "Griffon 27 March 1812" to the five surviving claimants from that vessel. (Note: The listing in the London Gazette mistakenly gives the name of Rosario's commander as "Trollope", and Griffon's commander as "Hervey".)

William Henderson assumed command of Rosario. Thomas Ladd Peake replaced Henderson in June 1813. (Note: For more on Thomas Ladd Peake see: O'Byrne, William R. (1849). "Peake, Thomas Ladd" . A Naval Biographical Dictionary. London: John Murray.)

== Anti-smuggling duty ==
Based in Portsmouth, Rosario spent the following years patrolling the coast.

On 18 April 1816, Rosario was in company with the schooner HMS Grecian when they captured the smuggling vessel Nancy. (Note: Peake's first-class share of the proceeds for 100 kegs of spirits and headmoney for the smuggler's five-man crew was worth £47 8s 11d; a fifth-class share, that of a seaman, was worth 14s.) Then on 4 June Rosario captured Charlotte, which had a three-man crew and was smuggling 85 kegs of spirits. (Note: Peake's first-class share was worth £77 14s 6d; a fifth-class share was worth £1 1s 7d.) Six weeks later, on 17 July, Rosario picked up 200 kegs of contraband spirits at sea. (Note: Peake's share was worth £68 2s 6d; a sixth-class share, that of an ordinary seaman, was worth £1 1s 7d.)

On 12 January 1817, she seized Ino, a smuggling boat loaded with 144 kegs of spirits. (Note: A first-class share of the prize money was worth £43 6s; a sixth-class share was worth £1 6d.) In March 1818, she went to the aid of the merchantman Kingston; her crew were later given a reward of £168. (Note: Peake's first-class share was worth £46 12s 5¼d; a sixth-class share was worth 16s 11¼d.)

In 1819, Rosario came under the command of William Hendry. She then returned to anti-smuggling duties. On 14 May 1819 she captured the sloop Providence, and then five days later, the open boat Fly. Lastly, on 25 June, she seized 98 gallons of spirits. (Note: A first-class share of the proceeds of these captures was worth £9 19s; a sixth-class share was worth 3s 10½d.) Rosario then transferred to the St. Helena station.

Following the death of Napoleon in May 1821, Frederick Marryat was appointed to command her and carry the dispatches announcing Napoleon's death to England. Between 20 September and 8 December Marrayat and Rosario made "sundry captures". (Note: The first-class share for these captures was worth £45 16s; a sixth-class share was worth 19s 7½d.)

== Fate ==
Rosario was paid off in February 1822. The Admiralty advertised that they were putting her up for sale on 22 August 1832 at Portsmouth. She was sold to J. Levy of Rochester for £380 in November 1832.
