= Flottille de Boulogne =

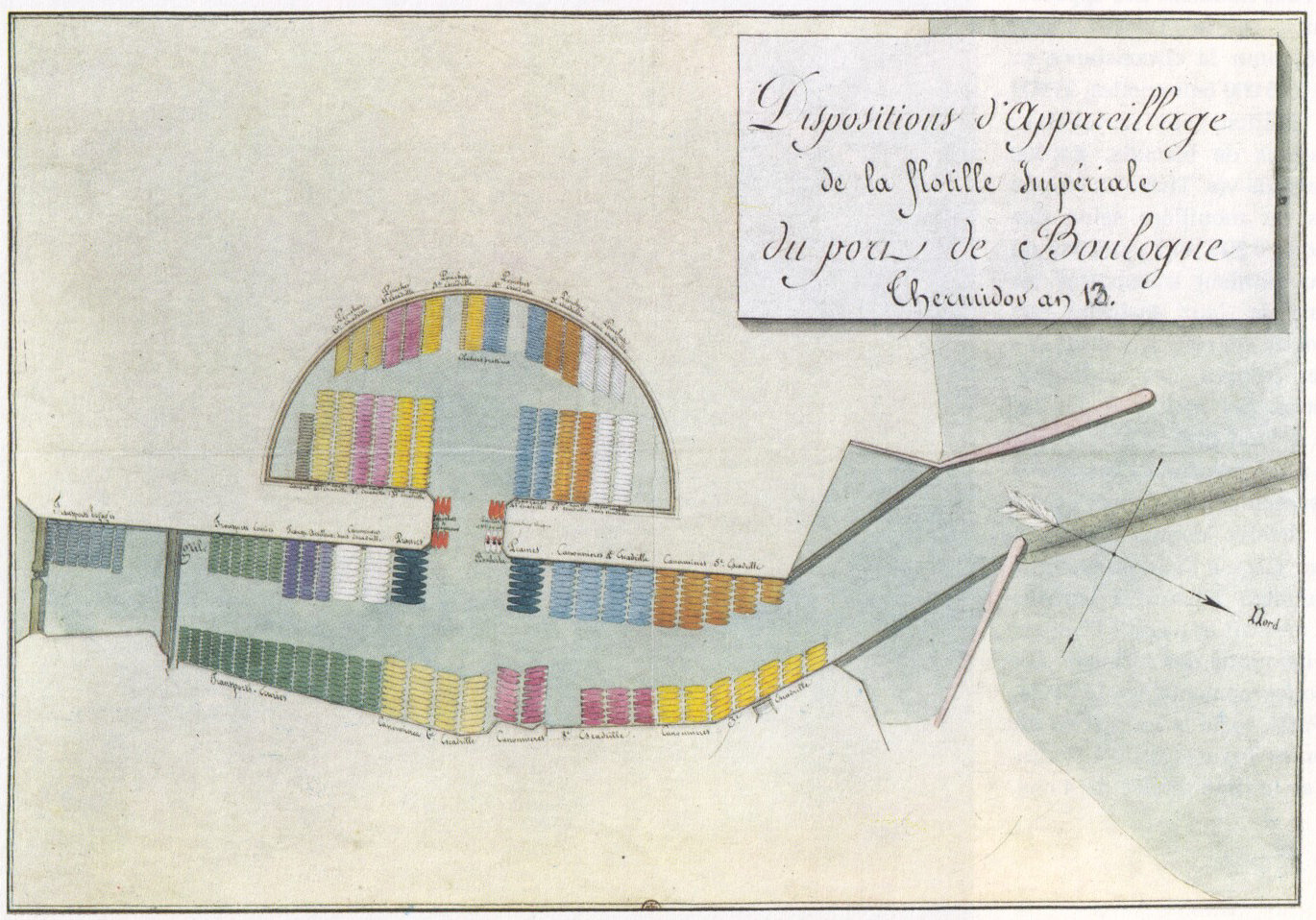
French flotilla intended for Napoleon's invasion of Britain

The Flottille de Boulogne was a large French fleet of small gunboats, brigs, and barges built in Boulogne on the orders of First Consul Napoleon Bonaparte from 1801. It was a key component of Napoleon's planned invasion of the United Kingdom.

== Prelude ==
At the Battle of Svensksund, the Swedes broke the naval stalemate with their Russian opponents and won a spectacular victory by engaging the Archipelago fleet, a flotilla of galleys, prams, and gunboats. With the French Navy weakened by the Glorious First of June, a strategic victory with a crushing tactical cost, and incapable of challenging the Royal Navy head-on since the Croisière du Grand Hiver, the concept of a rush across the English Channel to invade Britain, gained traction.

The plans of the ships designed by the Swedish shipwright Fredrik Henrik af Chapman were transmitted to Pierre-Alexandre-Laurent Forfait by A. M. Muskein in 1796. On 10 October 1794 the Committee of Public Safety created a first draft of the flotilla. On 25 December 1797, the French Directory appointed General Napoleon Bonaparte to the head of the Armée d'Angleterre.

== The flotilla ==
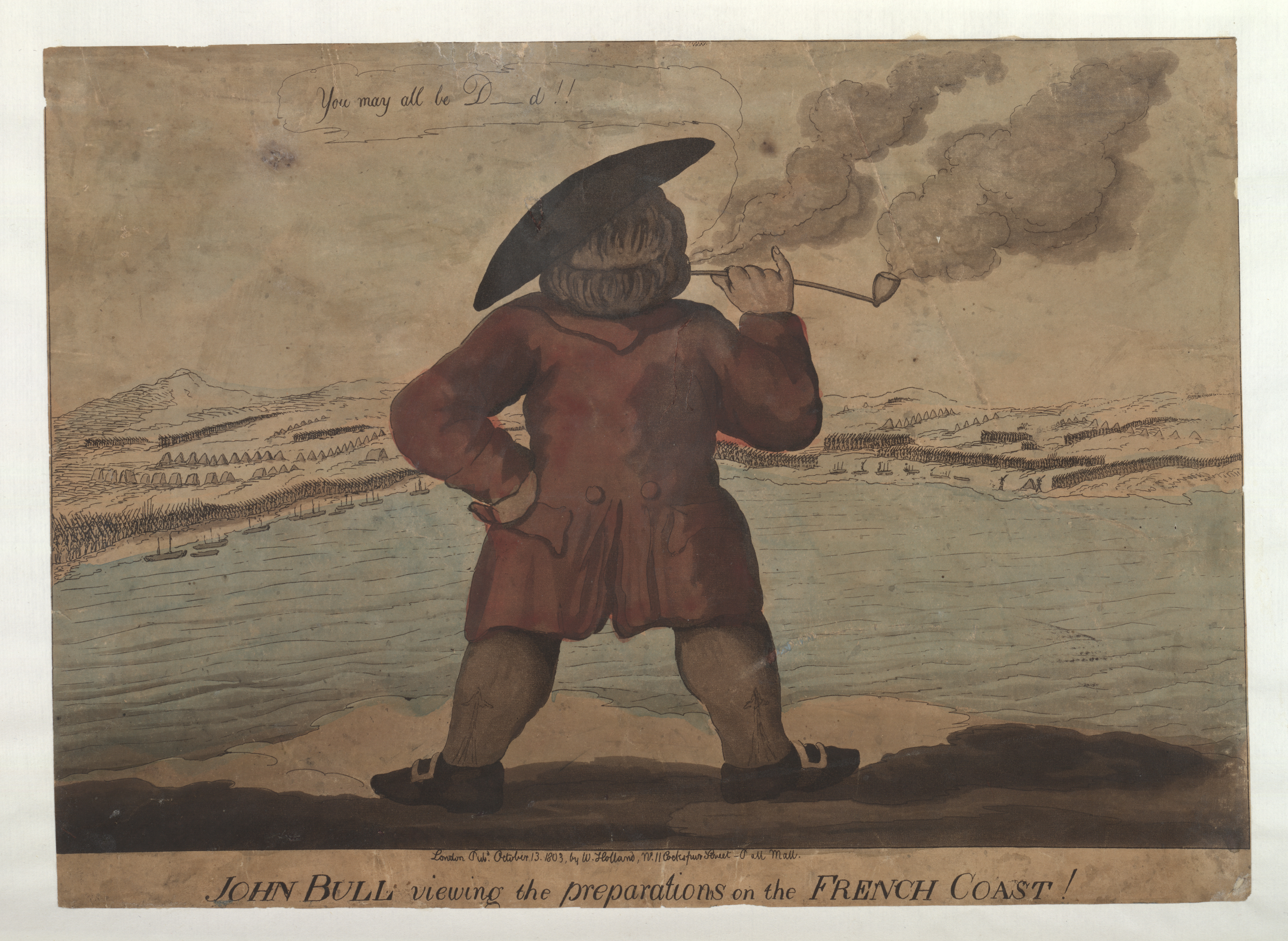
John Bull viewing the preparations on the French coast!, 1803

In a decree of 12 July 1801, the flotilla was organised into nine divisions. It comprised several types of ships:

- Bateau canonnier, a small two-masted fore-and-aft rigged gunboat carrying one large gun
- Chaloupe canonnière (or simply "canonnière"), a small brig
- Balancelle
- Prame, a flat-hulled barge

In the summer, the British under Lord Nelson launched a series of raids on Boulogne, with a first attempt on 4th of August, and others spread between the 15th and 16th of the same month, French admiral Louis-René Levassor de Latouche Tréville organised a successful defence that derailed the attacks.

The Treaty of Amiens of 25 March 1802 suspended the activity of the flotilla, but it was reactivated at the outbreak of the War of the Third Coalition in May 1803. Napoleon reorganised the flotilla, which was regularly attacked by British forces with little effect; against a background of constant harassing actions between small French and British ships, the flotilla achieved some limited victories against larger British warships, such as the capture of frigate HMS Minerve on 2 July 1803 off Cherbourg or the action of 15 July 1805.

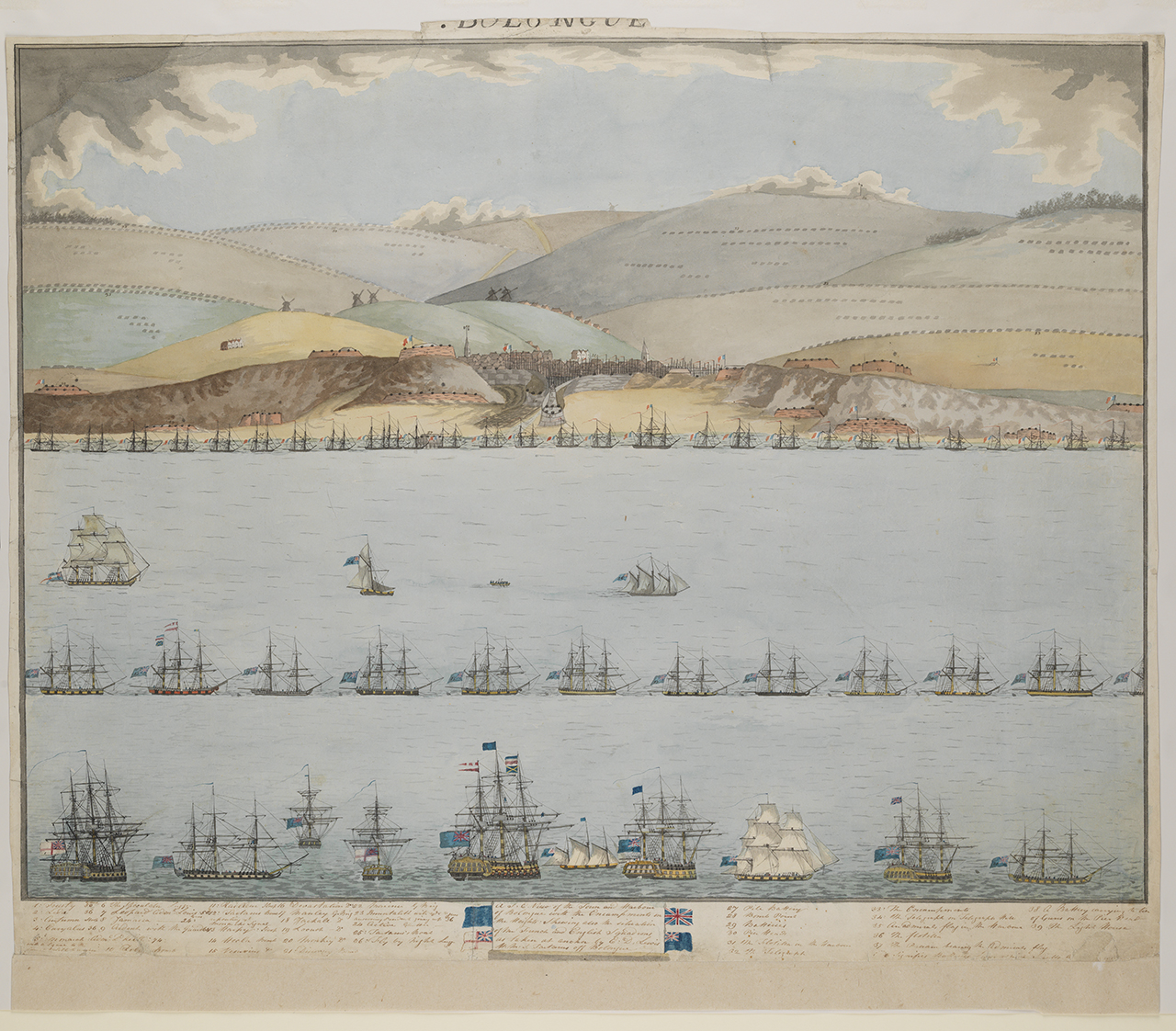
Plan and key of the British attack on Boulogne in October 1804, showing the flotilla hemmed in along the coast

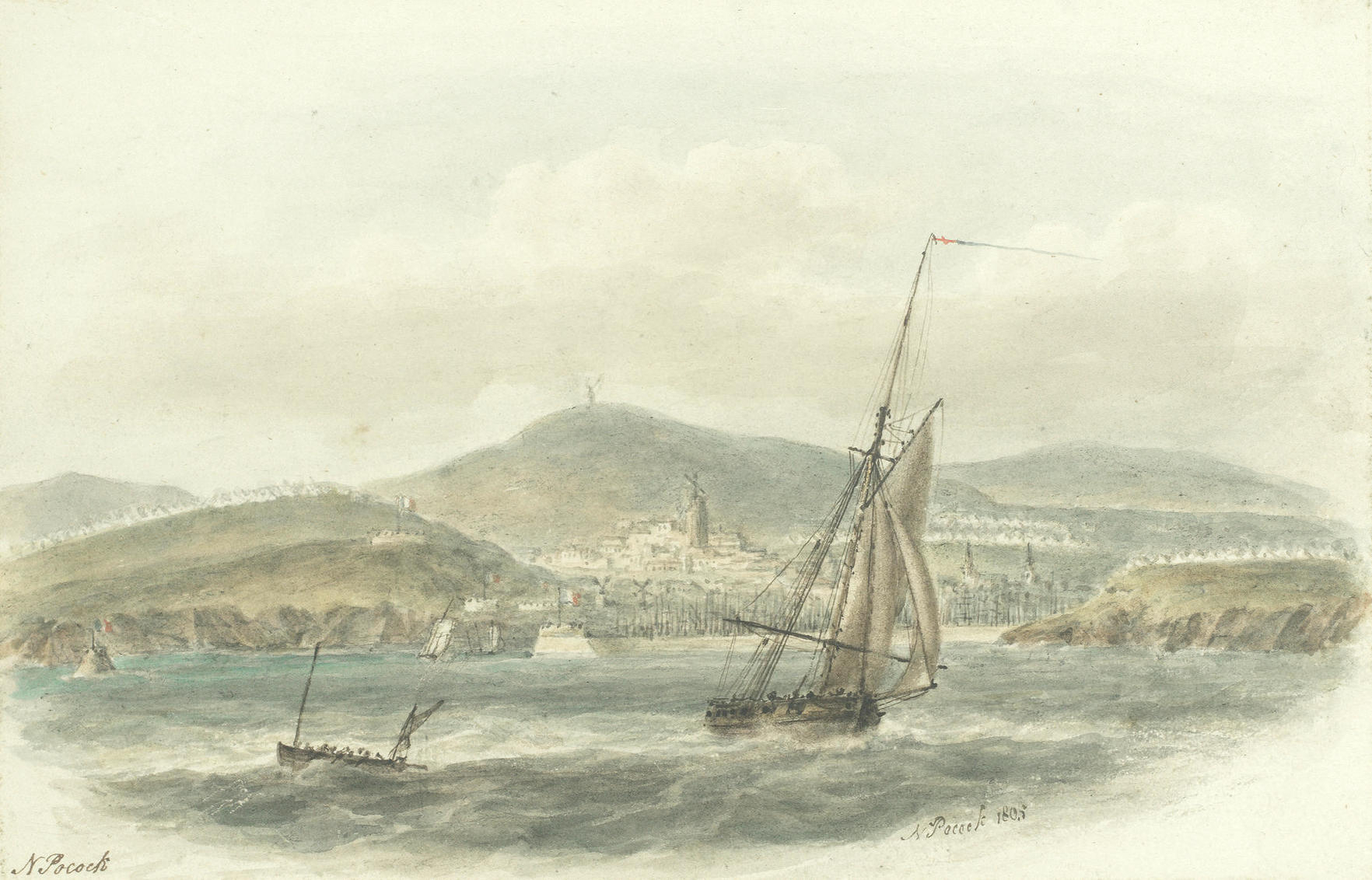
Boulogne Harbour, showing the flottille in the harbour and the army encampments in the hills behind, as recorded from HMS Euryalus in 1805

On 3 October 1804, a British force under Lord Keith attempted to destroy the flotilla using 25 fire ships, which were repelled. The attempt was renewed on 9 October 1806 using Congreve rockets, and the next days by gunfire, with no effect.

== Sources and references ==
=== Bibliography ===
- Gallois, Napoléon (1847). Les Corsaires français sous la République et l'Empire (in French). Vol. 1. Julien, Lanier et compagnie. p. 351.

50°43′27″N 1°35′46″E
