= List of ship launches in 1808 =

The list of ship launches in 1808 includes a chronological list of some ships launched in 1808.

Date	Ship	Class	Builder	Location	Country	Notes
16 January	Sir Joseph Banks	Schooner	Fernie	Arbroath	United Kingdom	For Commissioners of the Northern Lights.
20 January	Earl Fitzwilliam	Full-rigged ship	Robert Gleadow		United Kingdom	For Moxon & Co.
January	Governor Bligh	Merchantman		Green Hills	(United Kingdom of Great Britain and Ireland) New South Wales	For private owner.
1 February	Achates	Cherokee-class brig-sloop	Samuel Brent	Rotherhithe	United Kingdom	For Royal Navy.
13 February	Parthian	Cherokee-class brig-sloop	William Barnard	Deptford	United Kingdom	For Royal Navy.
13 February	Rolla	Cherokee-class brig-sloop	Thomas Pitcher	Northfleet	United Kingdom	For Royal Navy.
19 February	Rover	Cruizer-class brig-sloop	Joseph Todd	Berwick upon Tweed	United Kingdom	For Royal Navy.
24 February	Cherokee	Cherokee-class brig-sloop	John Perry	Blackwall Yard	United Kingdom	For Royal Navy.
26 February	Cadmus	Cherokee-class brig-sloop	John Dudman	Deptford	United Kingdom	For Royal Navy.
26 February	Trelawney	Full-rigged ship	William Bowes	Whitehaven	United Kingdom	For R Whiteside & Co.
27 February	Leveret	Cherokee-class brig-sloop	John Perry	Blackwall	United Kingdom	For Royal Navy.
February	Gunboat No. 16	Gunboat			United Kingdom	For Royal Navy.
February	Bellone	Fifth rate	Jean Jacques Denaix	Saint-Servan	France	For French Navy.
14 March	Thomas Grenville	East Indiaman		Bombay	India	For British East India Company.
15 March	Invincible	Ganges-class ship of the line	Edward Sison	Woolwich Dockyard	United Kingdom	For Royal Navy.
28 March	Bombay	Courageux-class ship of the line	Robert John Nelson	Deptford Dockyard	United Kingdom	For Royal Navy.
30 March	Briton	Brig	Steemson	Paull	United Kingdom	For the Company of Cheesemakers.
30 March	Racoon	Cormorant-class brig-sloop	John Preston	Great Yarmouth	United Kingdom	For Royal Navy.
March	Gunboat No. 32	Gunboat	Wade & Glanfield	Rotherhithe	United Kingdom	For Royal Navy.
March	Gunboat No. 33	Gunboat	Wade & Glanfield	Rotherhithe	United Kingdom	For Royal Navy.
March	Gunboat No. 34	Gunboat	Wade & Glanfield	Rotherhithe	United Kingdom	For Royal Navy.
March	Gunboat No. 35	Gunboat	Wade & Glanfield	Rotherhithe	United Kingdom	For Royal Navy.
March	Gunboat No. 36	Gunboat	Wade & Glanfield	Rotherhithe	United Kingdom	For Royal Navy.
9 April	Pallas	Pallas-class frigate	Mathurin Crucy	Nantes	France	For French Navy.
11 April	Amphitrite	Armide-class frigate	Jacques Louis Bonard	Cherbourg-en-Cotentin	France	For French Navy.
12 April	Venerable	Repulse-class ship of the line	Pitcher	Northfleet	United Kingdom	For Royal Navy.
26 April	Iphigenia	Perseverance-class frigate	Robert Seppings	Chatham Dockyard	United Kingdom	For Royal Navy.
26 April	Peruvian	Cruizer-class brig-sloop	George Parsons	Warsash	United Kingdom	For Royal Navy.
April	Ronco	Friedland-class brig		Venice	Kingdom of Italy	For French Navy.
April	Teulié	Friedland-class brig	Coccon	Venice	Kingdom of Italy	For French Navy.
3 May	Breslaw	Téméraire-class ship of the line		Genoa	Kingdom of Sardinia	For French Navy.
9 May	Sir Joseph Banks	Merchantman		Boston	United Kingdom	For private owner.
10 May	Ville de Varsovie	Bucentaure-class ship of the line	Arsenal de Rochefort	Rochefort	France	For French Navy.
14 May	Bombay	East Indiaman	Jamsetjee Bomanjee Wadia	Bombay	India	For British East India Company.
19 May	Briseis	Cherokee-class brig-sloop	John King	Upnor	United Kingdom	For Royal Navy.
21 May	Ariadna	Ariadna-class corvette		Kazan	Russia	For Imperial Russian Navy.
21 May	Belka	Scchyogol-class lugger	G. I. Koshkin	Kazan	Russia	For Imperial Russian Navy.
21 May	Gornostai	Scchyogol-class lugger	G. I. Koshkin	Kazan	Russia	For Imperial Russian Navy.
21 May	Iashcheritsa	Volga-class brig	G. I. Koshkin	Kazan	Russia	For Imperial Russian Navy.
21 May	Zmeia	Volga-class brig	G. I. Koshkin	Kazan	Russia	For Imperial Russian Navy.
23 May	Elbe	Pallas-class frigate	Mathurin Crucy	Nantes	France	For French Navy.
26 May	Brazen	Bittern-class ship-sloop	Nicholas Diddams	Portsmouth Dockyard	United Kingdom	For Royal Navy.
26 May	Knapton	West Indiaman	John Tindall	Scarborough	United Kingdom	For private owner.
26 May	Podargus	Crocus-class brig-sloop	Nicholas Diddams	Portsmouth Dockyard	United Kingdom	For Royal Navy.
27 May	Jasper	Cherokee-class brig-sloop	Jabez Bailey	Ipswich	United Kingdom	For Royal Navy.
27 May	Polonais	Téméraire-class ship of the line		Lorient	France	For French Navy.
28 May	Ephira	Cherokee-class brig-sloop	John King	Upnor	United Kingdom	For Royal Navy.
5 June	Mouche No. 3	Mouche No. 2-class schooner-aviso		Bayonne	France	For French Navy.
9 June	Tonnerre	Téméraire-class ship of the line		Brest	France	For French Navy.
10 June	Crocus	Crocus-class brig-sloop	Joseph Tucker	Plymouth	United Kingdom	For Royal Navy.
14 June	Bellona	Fifth rate		Venice	Kingdom of Italy	For Royal Italian Navy.
14 June	Mouche No. 2	Mouche No. 2-class schooner-aviso		Bayonne	France	For French Navy.
20 June	Poltava	Poltava-class ship of the line	M. K. Surotsov	Kherson	Russia	For Imperial Russian Navy.
23 June	Merope	Crocus-class brig-sloop	Robert Seppings	Chatham Dockyard	United Kingdom	For Royal Navy.
23 June	Mouche No. 4	Mouche No. 2-class schooner-aviso		Bayonne	France	For French Navy.
25 June	Caledonia	Caledonia-class ship of the line	Joseph Tucker	Plymouth Dockyard	United Kingdom	For Royal Navy.
25 June	Mouche No. 5	Mouche No. 2-class schooner-aviso		Bayonne	France	For French Navy.
25 June	Pelorus	Cruizer-class brig-sloop		Itchenor	United Kingdom	For Royal Navy.
June	Mouche No. 6	Mouche No. 2-class schooner-aviso		Bayonne	France	For French Navy.
1 July	Molniia	Bomb vessel	I. V. Kurepanov	Saint Petersburg	Russia	For Imperial Russian Navy.
1 July	Perun	Bomb vessel	I. V. Kurepanov	Saint Petersburg	Russia	For Imperial Russian Navy.
4 July	Donawerth	Bucentaure-class ship of the line		Toulon	France	For French Navy.
7 July	Ganimed	Ganimed-class lugger	A. I. Melikhov	Saint Petersburg	Russia	For Imperial Russian Navy.
7 July	Gonets	Gonets-class sloop	A. I. Melikhov	Saint Petersburg	Russia	For Imperial Russian Navy.
7 July	Iashcheritsa	Ganimed-class lugger	A. I. Melikhov	Saint Petersburg	Russia	For Imperial Russian Navy.
7 July	Mercurii	Gonets-class sloop	A. I. Melikhov	Saint Petersburg	Russia	For Imperial Russian Navy.
8 July	Calliope	Cherokee-class brig-sloop	John Dudman & Co.	Deptford	United Kingdom	For Royal Navy.
8 July	Mouche No. 7	Mouche No. 2-class schooner-aviso		Bayonne	France	For French Navy.
8 July	Onyx	Sloop-of-war	Jabez Bailey	Ipswich	United Kingdom	For Royal Navy.
8 July	Opossom	Cherokee-class brig-sloop	Edward Muddle	Gillingham	United Kingdom	For Royal Navy.
9 July	Creole	West Indiaman	Brocklebank	Lancaster	United Kingdom	For private owner.
9 July	Renard	Cherokee-class brig-sloop	John King	Upnor	United Kingdom	For Royal Navy.
9 July	Wild Boar	Cherokee-class brig-sloop	John Pelham	Frindsbury	United Kingdom	For Royal Navy.
11 July	Amfitrada	Amfitrada-class frigate	I. V. Kurepanov	Saint Petersburg	Russia	For Imperial Russian Navy.
13 July	Rinaldo	Cherokee-class brig-sloop	John Dudman	Deptford	Russia	For Royal Navy.
15 July	Smelyi	Second rate	A. I. Melikhov	Saint Petersburg	Russia	For Imperial Russian Navy.
15 July	Venera	Fifth rate	A. I. Melikhov	Saint Petersburg	Russia	For Imperial Russian Navy.
21 July	Amélie	Pallas-class frigate		Toulon	France	For French Navy.
22 July	Hope	Sloop-of-war	Jabez Bailey	Ipswich	United Kingdom	For Royal Navy.
23 July	Badger	Cherokee-class brig-sloop	John King	Upnor	United Kingdom	For Royal Navy.
23 July	Génie	Sylphe-class brig	Louis Bretocq	Dunkerque	France	For French Navy.
25 July	Semiramis	Apollo-class frigate	Robert John Nelson	Deptford	United Kingdom	For Royal Navy.
26 July	Chanticleer	Cherokee-class brig-sloop	Daniel List	East Cowes	United Kingdom	For Royal Navy.
26 July	Cordelia	Cherokee-class brig-sloop	John King	Frindsbury	United Kingdom	For Royal Navy.
26 July	Cornelia	Narcissus-class frigate	John Temple	Jarrow	United Kingdom	For Royal Navy.
28 July	Britomart	Cherokee-class brig-sloop	John Dudman & Co.	Deptford	United Kingdom	For Royal Navy.
28 July	Calliope	Cherokee-class brig-sloop	John Dudman	Deptford	United Kingdom	For Royal Navy.
28 July	Prince Arthur	Cherokee-class brig-sloop	John Dudman	Deptford	United Kingdom	For Royal Navy.
29 July	Redpole	Cherokee-class brig-sloop	Robert Guillaume	Northam	United Kingdom	For Royal Navy.
July	Bodryi	Bodryi-class frigate	A. I. Melikhov	Saint Petersburg	Russia	For Imperial Russian Navy.
July	Neva	Bodryi-class frigate	A. I. Melikhov	Saint Petersburg	Russia	For Imperial Russian Navy.
July	Petergof	Bodryi-class frigate	A. I. Melikhov	Saint Petersburg	Russia	For Imperial Russian Navy.
July	Sveaborg	Bodryi-class frigate	A. I. Melikhov	Saint Petersburg	Russia	For Imperial Russian Navy.
5 August	Helicon	Cherokee-class brig-sloop	John King	Upnor	United Kingdom	For Royal Navy.
8 August	Colibri	Palinure-class brig (privateer)	François-Toussaint Gréhan	Havre de Grâce	(flag) France	For French Navy.
8 August	Goldfinch	Cherokee-class brig-sloop	John Warwick	Eling	United Kingdom	For Royal Navy.
8 August	Clorinde	Pallas-class frigate	Mathurin Crucy	Paimbœuf	France	For French Navy.
10 August	Apelles	Crocus-class brig-sloop	Edward Sison	Woolwich Dockyard	United Kingdom	For Royal Navy.
15 August	Austerlitz	Océan-class ship of the line	Jean-Baptiste Lefebvre	Toulon	France	For French Navy.
21 August	Dalmate	Téméraire-class ship of the line		Antwerp	France	For French Navy.
21 August	Renommée	Pallas-class frigate		Nantes	France	For French Navy.
22 August	Vistule	Milanaise-class frigate	Louis Jean Baptiste Bretocq	Dunkerque	France	For French Navy.
22 August	Lyra	Cherokee-class brig-sloop	John Dudman	Deptford	United Kingdom	For Royal Navy.
23 August	Blake	Courageux-class ship of the line	Robert John Nelson	Deptford Dockyard	United Kingdom	For Royal Navy.
August	Atalante	Bermuda-class ship-sloop	Goodrich	Bermuda	(United Kingdom of Great Britain and Ireland) Bermuda	For Royal Navy.
August	Entreprenant	Brig gourable	Grisard	Port-Napoléon	Île de France	For French Navy.
5 September	Mouche No. 8	Mouche No. 2-class schooner-aviso		Bayonne	France	For French Navy.
7 September	Woodman	Merchantman	John Smith	Gainsborough	United Kingdom	For Mr. Bousfield.
8 September	Gainsboro'	Merchantman	Smith	Gainsborough	United Kingdom	For private owner.
10 September	Mouche No. 9	Mouche No. 2-class schooner-aviso	Jean-Baptiste Lemoye-Sérigny	Rochefort	France	For French Navy.
10 September	Mouche No. 10	Mouche No. 2-class schooner-aviso	Jean-Baptiste Lemoye-Sérigny	Rochefort	France	For French Navy.
13 September	Mouche No. 16	Mouche No. 2-class schooner-aviso	Louis Bretocq	location	France	For French Navy.
13 September	Torneo	Bodryi-class frigate	A. I. Melikhov	Saint Petersburg	Russia	For Imperial Russian Navy.
15 September	Mouche No. 17	Mouche No. 2-class schooner-aviso		Vlissingen	(Netherlands) Kingdom of Holland	For French Navy.
15 September	Mouche No. 18	Mouche No. 2-class schooner-aviso		Vlissingen	(Netherlands) Kingdom of Holland	For French Navy.
15 September	Mouche No. 19	Mouche No. 2-class schooner-aviso		Vlissingen	(Netherlands) Kingdom of Holland	For French Navy.
15 September	Shamrock	Shamrock-class schooner		Bermuda	(United Kingdom of Great Britain and Ireland) Bermuda	For Royal Navy.
19 September	Mouche No. 11	Mouche No. 2-class schooner-aviso		Nantes	France	For French Navy.
20 September	Hébé	Sixth rate		Bordeaux	United Kingdom	For French Navy.
22 September	Elisa	Pallas-class frigate	François-Toussaint Gréhan	Havre de Grâce	France	For French Navy.
22 September	Mouche No. 12	Mouche No. 2-class schooner-aviso		Lorient	France	For French Navy.
27 September	Thistle	Shamrock-class schooner		Bermuda	(United Kingdom of Great Britain and Ireland) Bermuda	For Royal Navy.
September	La Louise	Schooner		Plymouth	United Kingdom	For private owner.
2 October	Albanais	Téméraire-class ship of the line		Antwerp	France	For French Navy.
4 October	Favorita	Pallas-class frigate	Battistella	Venice	Kingdom of Italy	For Royal Italian Navy.
6 October	Doterel	Cruizer-class brig-sloop	Richard Blake & John Scott	Bursledon	United Kingdom	For Royal Navy.
12 October	Lord Cathcart	Merchantman	Temple shipbuilders	Jarrow	United Kingdom	For T. & R. Brown.
20 October	Victorious	Swiftsure-class ship of the line	Balthazar Adams	Buckler's Hard	United Kingdom	For Royal Navy.
20 October	William Miles	West Indiaman	Josiah Gist, George Hilhouse, James Martin Hilhouse, Robert Hilhouse and Philip John Miles	Bristol	United Kingdom	For Philip John Miles.
October	La Cornelie	Schooner		Bordeaux	France	For private owner.
October	London	Merchantman		Quebec	(United Kingdom of Great Britain and Ireland) Lower Canada	Forprivate owner.
October	Mouche No. 14	Mouche No. 2-class schooner-aviso	Jean-Charles Garrigues	Boulogne	France	For French Navy.
October	Mouche No. 15	Mouche No. 2-class schooner-aviso	Jean-Charles Garrigues	Boulogne	France	For French Navy.
2 November	Langeland	Brig	Ernst Wilhelm Stibolt	Copenhagen	Denmark-Norway	For Dano-Norwegian Navy.
2 November	Neptune	Brig	Thomas Steemson	Paull	United Kingdom	For the Company of Cheesemakers.
3 November	Bucephalus	Frigate	William Rowe	Newcastle upon Tyne	United Kingdom	For Royal Navy.
3 November	Drake	Cherokee-class brig-sloop	Jabez Bailey	Ipswich	United Kingdom	For Royal Navy.
5 November	Mouche No. 13	Mouche No. 2-class schooner-aviso	Jean-Charles Garrigues	Brest	France	For French Navy.
8 November	Niémen	Armide-class frigate	Jean-François Chaumont	Bordeaux	France	For French Navy.
9 November	Admiraal de Ruyter	Wreeker-class ship of the line	R. Dorman	Amsterdam	(Netherlands) Kingdom of Holland	For Royal Dutch Navy.
12 November	Mariia	Anapa-class ship of the line	M. K. Surovtsov	Kherson	Russia	For Imperial Russian Navy.
17 November	Louisa	Merchantman	Hudson, Bacon, Harvey & Weatherall	Calcutta	India	For John Pascal Larkins.
17 November	Woodlark	Cherokee-class brig-sloop	William Rowe	Newcastle upon Tyne	United Kingdom	For Royal Navy.
18 November	Eylau	Bucentaure-class ship of the line		Lorient	France	For French Navy.
19 November	Admiraal Evertsen	Wreeker-class ship of the line	R. Dorman	Amsterdam	(Netherlands) Kingdom of Holland	For Royal Dutch Navy.
19 November	Béarnais	Palinure-class brig		Bayonne	France	For French Navy.
19 November	Owen Glendower	Apollo-class frigate	Thomas Steemson	Paull	United Kingdom	For Royal Navy.
19 November	Pusey Hall	West Indiaman	John Brockbank	Lancaster	United Kingdom	For James Moore & Co.
21 November	Bheemoolah	Merchantman	Matthew Smith	Howrah	India	For private owner.
21 November	Shearwater	Cherokee-class brig-sloop	William Rowe	Newcastle upon Tyne	United Kingdom	For Royal Navy.
7 December	Rosario	Cherokee-class brig-sloop	Jabez Bailey	Ipswich	United Kingdom	For Royal Navy.
12 December	Wild Boar	Cherokee-class brig-sloop	John Pelham	Frindsbury	United Kingdom	For Royal Navy.
16 December	Tyrian	Cherokee-class brig-sloop	Robert Guillaume	Northam	United Kingdom	For Royal Navy.
20 December	Bermuda	Cherokee-class brig-sloop	John Pelham	Frindsbury	United Kingdom	For Royal Navy.
20 December	Dauntless	Cormorant-class ship-sloop	Robert John Nelson	Deptford Dockyard	United Kingdom	For Royal Navy.
21 December	Danube	Téméraire-class ship of the line		Toulon	France	For French Navy.
December	Gunboat No. 37	Gunboat			United Kingdom	For Royal Navy.
December	Gunboat No. 38	Gunboat			United Kingdom	For Royal Navy.
December	Gunboat No. 39	Gunboat			United Kingdom	For Royal Navy.
December	Gunboat No. 40	Gunboat			United Kingdom	For Royal Navy.
December	Gunboat No. 41	Gunboat			United Kingdom	For Royal Navy.
December	Gunboat No. 42	Gunboat			United Kingdom	For Royal Navy.
December	Gunboat No. 43	Gunboat			United Kingdom	For Royal Navy.
December	Gunboat No. 44	Gunboat			United Kingdom	For Royal Navy.
December	Gunboat No. 45	Gunboat			United Kingdom	For Royal Navy.
December	Gunboat No. 46	Gunboat			United Kingdom	For Royal Navy.
December	Gunboat No. 47	Gunboat			United Kingdom	For Royal Navy.
December	Gunboat No. 48	Gunboat			United Kingdom	For Royal Navy.
December	Gunboat No. 49	Gunboat			United Kingdom	For Royal Navy.
December	Gunboat No. 50	Gunboat			United Kingdom	For Royal Navy.
December	Gunboat No. 51	Gunboat			United Kingdom	For Royal Navy.
December	Gunboat No. 52	Gunboat			United Kingdom	For Royal Navy.
December	Gunboat No. 53	Gunboat			United Kingdom	For Royal Navy.
December	Gunboat No. 54	Gunboat			United Kingdom	For Royal Navy.
December	Gunboat No. 55	Gunboat			United Kingdom	For Royal Navy.
December	Gunboat No. 56	Gunboat			United Kingdom	For Royal Navy.
December	Gunboat No. 57	Gunboat			United Kingdom	For Royal Navy.
December	Gunboat No. 58	Gunboat			United Kingdom	For Royal Navy.
December	Gunboat No. 59	Gunboat			United Kingdom	For Royal Navy.
December	Gunboat No. 60	Gunboat			United Kingdom	For Royal Navy.
December	Gunboat No. 61	Gunboat			United Kingdom	For Royal Navy.
December	Gunboat No. 62	Gunboat			United Kingdom	For Royal Navy.
December	Gunboat No. 63	Gunboat			United Kingdom	For Royal Navy.
December	Gunboat No. 64	Gunboat			United Kingdom	For Royal Navy.
December	Gunboat No. 65	Gunboat			United Kingdom	For Royal Navy.
December	Gunboat No. 66	Gunboat			United Kingdom	For Royal Navy.
December	Gunboat No. 67	Gunboat			United Kingdom	For Royal Navy.
December	Gunboat No. 68	Gunboat			United Kingdom	For Royal Navy.
December	Gunboat No. 69	Gunboat			United Kingdom	For Royal Navy.
December	Gunboat No. 70	Gunboat			United Kingdom	For Royal Navy.
December	Gunboat No. 71	Gunboat			United Kingdom	For Royal Navy.
December	Gunboat No. 72	Gunboat			United Kingdom	For Royal Navy.
December	Gunboat No. 73	Gunboat			United Kingdom	For Royal Navy.
December	Gunboat No. 74	Gunboat			United Kingdom	For Royal Navy.
December	Gunboat No. 75	Gunboat			United Kingdom	For Royal Navy.
December	Gunboat No. 76	Gunboat			United Kingdom	For Royal Navy.
December	Gunboat No. 77	Gunboat			United Kingdom	For Royal Navy.
December	Gunboat No. 78	Gunboat			United Kingdom	For Royal Navy.
December	Gunboat No. 79	Gunboat			United Kingdom	For Royal Navy.
December	Gunboat No. 80	Gunboat			United Kingdom	For Royal Navy.
December	Gunboat No. 81	Gunboat			United Kingdom	For Royal Navy.
December	Gunboat No. 82	Gunboat			United Kingdom	For Royal Navy.
December	Gunboat No. 83	Gunboat			United Kingdom	For Royal Navy.
December	Gunboat No. 84	Gunboat			United Kingdom	For Royal Navy.
December	Gunboat No. 85	Gunboat			United Kingdom	For Royal Navy.
Unknown date	Admiraal Tromp	Third rate		Rotterdam	(Netherlands) Kingdom of Holland	For Royal Dutch Navy.
Unknown date	Atlas	Privateer		St. Michael's, Maryland	United States	For Thomas Tennant.
Unknown date	Auguste	Privateer	Courau Frères	Bordeaux	France	For private owner.
Unknown date	Aurora	Merchantman		Whitby	United Kingdom	For Fishburn & Brodick.
Unknown date	Balder	Gun-brig		Bergen	Denmark-Norway	For Dano-Norwegian Navy.
Unknown date	Bowes	Merchantman		Workington	United Kingdom	For private owner.
Unknown date	Clorinde	Pallas-class frigate			France	For Royal Navy.
Unknown date	Créole	Sloop-of-war		Île de France	Île de France	For French Navy.
Unknown date	Drozd	Drozd-class cutter	G. S. Isakov	Lodeynoye Pole	Russia	For Imperial Russian Navy.
Unknown date	Duc de Dantzig	Brig		Nantes	United Kingdom	For M. Tisset.
Unknown date	Gunboat No. 1	Gunboat			United Kingdom	For Royal Navy.
Unknown date	Gunboat No. 2	Gunboat			United Kingdom	For Royal Navy.
Unknown date	Gunboat No. 3	Gunboat			United Kingdom	For Royal Navy.
Unknown date	Gunboat No. 4	Gunboat			United Kingdom	For Royal Navy.
Unknown date	Gunboat No. 5	Gunboat			United Kingdom	For Royal Navy.
Unknown date	Gunboat No. 6	Gunboat			United Kingdom	For Royal Navy.
Unknown date	Gunboat No. 7	Gunboat			United Kingdom	For Royal Navy.
Unknown date	Gunboat No. 8	Gunboat			United Kingdom	For Royal Navy.
Unknown date	Gunboat No. 9	Gunboat			United Kingdom	For Royal Navy.
Unknown date	Gunboat No. 10	Gunboat			United Kingdom	For Royal Navy.
Unknown date	Gunboat No. 11	Gunboat			United Kingdom	For Royal Navy.
Unknown date	Gunboat No. 13	Gunboat			United Kingdom	For Royal Navy.
Unknown date	Gunboat No. 14	Gunboat			United Kingdom	For Royal Navy.
Unknown date	Gunboat No. 15	Gunboat			United Kingdom	For Royal Navy.
Unknown date	Gunboat No. 17	Gunboat			United Kingdom	For Royal Navy.
Unknown date	Gunboat No. 18	Gunboat			United Kingdom	For Royal Navy.
Unknown date	Gunboat No. 19	Gunboat			United Kingdom	For Royal Navy.
Unknown date	Gunboat No. 20	Gunboat			United Kingdom	For Royal Navy.
Unknown date	Gunboat No. 21	Gunboat			United Kingdom	For Royal Navy.
Unknown date	Gunboat No. 22	Gunboat			United Kingdom	For Royal Navy.
Unknown date	Gunboat No. 23	Gunboat			United Kingdom	For Royal Navy.
Unknown date	Gunboat No. 24	Gunboat			United Kingdom	For Royal Navy.
Unknown date	Gunboat No. 25	Gunboat			United Kingdom	For Royal Navy.
Unknown date	Gunboat No. 26	Gunboat			United Kingdom	For Royal Navy.
Unknown date	Gunboat No. 27	Gunboat			United Kingdom	For Royal Navy.
Unknown date	Gunboat No. 28	Gunboat			United Kingdom	For Royal Navy.
Unknown date	Gunboat No. 29	Gunboat			United Kingdom	For Royal Navy.
Unknown date	Gunboat No. 30	Gunboat			United Kingdom	For Royal Navy.
Unknown date	Gunboat No. 31	Gunboat			United Kingdom	For Royal Navy.
Unknown date	Hero	Brig		Sunderland	United Kingdom	For private owner
Unknown date	Iastreb	Drozd-class cutter	G. S. Isakov	Lodeynoye Pole	Russia	For Imperial Russian Navy.
Unknown date	La Caroline	Privateer schooner		Bayonne	France	For private owner.
Unknown date	Lady Lushington	Merchantman	B. & E. Adams	Bucklers Hard	United Kingdom	For private owner.
Unknown date	Leonidas	Merchantman	John & Philip Laing	Sunderland	United Kingdom	For Mr. Middleton.
Unknown date	Leshch	Drozd-class cutter	G. S. Isakov	Lodeynoye Pole	Russia	For Imperial Russian Navy.
Unknown date	L'Etourdie	Privateer		La Ciotat	France	For private owner.
Unknown date	Los	Drozd-class cutter	G. S. Isakov	Lodeynoye Pole	Russia	For Imperial Russian Navy.
Unknown date	Ludlow	Full-rigged ship			United States	For United States Navy.
Unknown date	Matchless	Smack	Nicholas Bools & William Good	Bridport	United Kingdom	For Matthew Lee Yates.
Unknown date	Muravei	Drozd-class cutter	G. S. Isakov	Lodeynoye Pole	Russia	For Imperial Russian Navy.
Unknown date	Ocean	Merchantman	Barrick	Whitby	United Kingdom	For private owner.
Unknown date	Olen	Drozd-class cutter	G. S. Isakov	Lodeynoye Pole	Russia	For Imperial Russian Navy.
Unknown date	Perseverance	Brig	Samuel Cooke	Deptford	United Kingdom	For Mr. Cook.
Unknown date	Peruvian	Cruizer-class brig-sloop	Parsons	Warsash	United Kingdom	For Royal Navy.
Unknown date	Pugliese	Schooner			Kingdom of Naples	For Royal Neapolitan Navy.
Unknown date	Rapid	Sloop-of-war	Robert Davy	Topsham	United Kingdom	For Royal Navy.
Unknown date	Revenge	Schooner	James Ingraham	Charleston, South Carolina	United States	For United States Navy.
Unknown date	Shchyoglenok	Drozd-class cutter	G. S. Isakov	Lodeynoye Pole	Russia	For Imperial Russian Navy.
Unknown date	Stafford	Brig		Sunderland	United Kingdom	For Mr. Jameson.
Unknown date	Sverchok	Drozd-class cutter	G. S. Isakov	Lodeynoye Pole	Russia	For Imperial Russian Navy.
Unknown date	Swift	Sloop	John Ball	Salcombe	United Kingdom	For private owner.
Unknown date	Thor	Gun-brig		Bergen	Denmark-Norway	For Dano-Norwegian Navy.
Unknown date	Unilo	Fourth rate		Bahia	State of Brazil	For Portuguese Navy.
Unknown date	Wanderer	Schooner	Nicholas Bools & William Good	Bridport	United Kingdom	For Mr. Cummings.
Unknown date	Westmoreland	Merchantman			United Kingdom	For Hartley & Co.
Unknown date	Wilmer	Galley			United States	For United States Navy.
Unknown date	Windham	Merchantman		Demaun	India	For private owner.
Unknown date	No. 89	Drozd-class cutter	G. S. Isakov	Lodeynoye Pole	Russia	For Imperial Russian Navy.
Unknown date	No. 90	Drozd-class cutter	G. S. Isakov	Lodeynoye Pole	Russia	For Imperial Russian Navy.
Unknown date	Name unknown	Merchantman			Sweden	For private owner.
Unknown date	Name unknown	Merchantman		Batavia	(Netherlands) Dutch East Indies	For private owner.
Unknown date	Name unknown	Galiot			Denmark-Norway	For private owner.
