= List of shipwrecks in June 1843 =

The list of shipwrecks in June 1843 includes ships sunk, foundered, wrecked, grounded, or otherwise lost during June 1843.

== 1 June ==
List of shipwrecks: 1 June 1843
Ship	State	Description
Exmouth	United Kingdom	The ship was driven ashore in Colwell Bay. She was refloated the next day and resumed her voyage.
John	United States	The ship was lost off "James's Point". She was on a voyage from New Orleans, Louisiana to New York.
Rose	United Kingdom	The ship was in collision with Mary Ann (United Kingdom) and sank with the loss of all but one of her crew. She was on a voyage from Pictou, Nova Scotia, British North America to Boston, Massachusetts, United States.

== 2 June ==
List of shipwrecks: 2 June 1843
Ship	State	Description
Seahorse	(United Kingdom of Great Britain and Ireland) New South Wales	The steamship was wrecked on a reef at the mouth of the Tamar River. All on board were rescued. She was on a voyage from Port Phillip to Sydney.
Tartar	United Kingdom	The brig, laden with ammunition, caught fire, exploded and sank at Southampton, Hampshire.
Thomas Grenville	United Kingdom	The ship was destroyed by fire at Bombay, India.

== 3 June ==
List of shipwrecks: 3 June 1843
Ship	State	Description
Cingalese	United Kingdom	The ship ran aground near "Maw Eater's Island". Netherlands East Indies. She had been refloated by 8 June and taken into Batavia.
Eagle	United Kingdom	The paddle steamer collided with a sailing barge and sank in the River Thames at Gravesend, Kent. All on board survived. She was refloated on 4 June and towed to the Hungeford Stairs, London by Falcon (United Kingdom).

== 4 June ==
List of shipwrecks: 4 June 1843
Ship	State	Description
Sophia	Spain	The ship ran aground west of Bermuda. She was on a voyage from Porto Rico to Spain. She was refloated.

== 5 June ==
List of shipwrecks: 5 June 1843
Ship	State	Description
Eliza Ann	United Kingdom	The ship was holed by her anchor and sank at Truro. Cornwall. She was refloated on 12 March and beached for repairs.
Josephine	France	The ship was wrecked on a reef off "Porto Real". Her crew were rescued. She was on a voyage from Bordeaux, Gironde to Puerto Rico.
Rocket	United Kingdom	The ship was driven ashore and damaged at Huttoft, Lincolnshire. She was on a voyage from Sunderland, County Durham to King's Lynn, Norfolk.

== 6 June ==
List of shipwrecks: 6 June 1843
Ship	State	Description
Ganymede; Mary	United Kingdom	Mary was driven into Ganymede at British Honduras. Both vessels were severely damaged.
Pink	United Kingdom	The ship was wrecked near "Bangermassing", India.
Wassily Williky	Russia	The ship was driven ashore on Dragør, Denmark. She was refloated the next day.
York	United Kingdom	The ship was driven ashore on Skagen, Denmark. She was on a voyage from St. Jago de Cuba, Cuba to Saint Petersburg, Russia.

== 7 June ==
List of shipwrecks: 7 June 1843
Ship	State	Description
Colyton Union	United Kingdom	The schooner was driven ashore near Seaton, Devon. She had been refloated by 20 June.
Eagle	United Kingdom	The ship was wrecked near Seaton. Her crew were rescued.
Pallion	United Kingdom	The brig was wrecked on the Maplin Sand, in the North Sea off the coast of Essex. Her crew were rescued. She was on a voyage from Sunderland, County Durham to London.
Siren	United Kingdom	The ship was abandoned in the Atlantic Ocean. Her crew were rescued. She was on a voyage from Dublin to Saint John, New Brunswick, British North America.

== 8 June ==
List of shipwrecks: 8 June 1843
Ship	State	Description
Alexander	United Kingdom	The ship was driven ashore and wrecked at "Torwyn", Glamorgan with the loss of her captain. She was on a voyage from Youghal, County Cork to Swansea, Glamorgan.
British Queen	(United Kingdom of Great Britain and Ireland) Guernsey	The ship was driven ashore and damaged at Budleigh Salterton, Devon. She was refloated on 12 June and taken into Starcross, Devon.
Courier	United States	The brig was abandoned in the Atlantic Ocean (50°32′N 12°46′W) with the loss of one of her ten crew. Survivors were rescued by Sarah (United Kingdom). Courier was on a voyage from Miramichi, New Brunswick, British North America to The Mumbles, Glamorgan. She came ashore at A Coruña, Spain on 25 September.
De Spruit	Netherlands	The ship was wrecked in Rathropelan Cove, County Waterford, United Kingdom with the loss of three of her crew. She was on a voyage from Schiedam, South Holland to Liverpool, Lancashire.
Dos Hermanos	Spain	The ship was wrecked at Bilbao. Her crew were rescued. She was on a voyage from Nantes, Loire-Inférieure, France to San Sebastián.
Friends	United Kingdom	The schooner was driven ashore in Clonea Bay, County Waterford with the loss of all hands. She was on a voyage from Neath, Glamorgan to Cork.
Hurricane	United Kingdom	The schooner ran aground and was damaged in the River Thames at Wapping, Middlesex. She was on a voyage from London to Grangemouth, Stirlingshire. She was refloated and put under repair.
Le Père Hetet	France	The brig ran aground on the Long Sand, in the North Sea off the coast of Essex, United Kingdom. She was on a voyage from Newcastle upon Tyne, Northumberland, United Kingdom to Marseille, Bouches-du-Rhône. She was take into Harwich, Essex with the assistance of three smacks.
Margaret	United Kingdom	The ship sank at Dungarvan, County Waterford.
Mary and Betsey	United Kingdom	The ship was driven ashore on the Dyke Sand, in the North Sea. She was refloated on 14 June and taken into Ramsgate, Kent for repairs.
Mary Ann	United Kingdom	The ship was driven ashore and severely damaged at Ingoldmells, Lincolnshire.
Phœbe	United Kingdom	The ship was driven ashore and wrecked at Aberdyfi, Merionethshire.
Sir Robert Campbell	United Kingdom	The ship capsized and sank in the Bute Canal at Cardiff, Glamorgan. She was refloated on 11 June and put under repair.
Vistula	United Kingdom	The ship foundered in the North Sea off St. Abb's Head, Berwickshire. Her crew were rescued by Rhine (United Kingdom). Vistula was on a voyage from Sunderland, County Durham to Nairn, Inverness-shire.

== 9 June ==
List of shipwrecks: 9 June 1843
Ship	State	Description
Alexander	United Kingdom	The ship was wrecked at Pembrey, Glamorgan. Her crew survived. She was on a voyage from Youghal, County Cork to Swansea, Glamorgan.
Ann	United Kingdom	The flat was driven ashore at the mouth of the River Dee. Her crew were rescued by the Point of Ayr Lifeboat.
Caroline	United Kingdom	The ship was driven ashore in Saint Brélades Bay, Jersey, Channel Islands.
Elizabeth	United Kingdom	The ship was driven ashore and wrecked at Crosby Point, Lancashire. She was on a voyage from Mobile, Alabama, United States to Liverpool, Lancashire. She was refloated on 26 June and taken into Liverpool.
Shannon	United Kingdom	The ship was driven ashore and wrecked at Flamborough Head, Yorkshire.
The Friends	United Kingdom	The schooner was driven ashore and wrecked at Dungarvan, County Waterford with the loss of all hands. She was on a voyage from Neath, Glamorgan to Cork.
William Ladd	United States	The barque was driven ashore and wrecked in Brownston Bay, County Waterford, United Kingdom with the loss of either three lives or fifteen of her sixteen crew. Those that survived were rescued by the Coast Guard. She was on a voyage from Mobile, Alabama to Liverpool, Lancashire, United Kingdom.

== 10 June ==
List of shipwrecks: 10 June 1843
Ship	State	Description
Robertina	United Kingdom	The ship ran aground off Trinidad. She was on a voyage from Trinidad to London. She was refloated on 12 June and resumed her voyage.
Rontho	Russia	The ship was driven ashore near Kastrup, Denmark. She was on a voyage from Cardiff, Glamorgan, United Kingdom to Kronstadt.
Saucy Jack	United Kingdom	The ship was holed by her anchor and sank at Dundalk, County Louth. She was later refloated.

== 11 June ==
List of shipwrecks: 11 June 1843
Ship	State	Description
Anna Elizabeth	United Kingdom	The ship was sunk by ice off "Soesnowetz Island", Russia. Her crew were rescued by Abus (United Kingdom. Anna Elizabeth was on a voyage from Sunderland, County Durham to Arkhangelsk, Russia.

== 12 June ==
List of shipwrecks: 12 June 1843
Ship	State	Description
Neptune	(United Kingdom of Great Britain and Ireland) Guernsey	The ship struck a rock and was damaged entering port in Guernsey.
Norman	United Kingdom	The ship was driven ashore near "Balius Point", British North America. She was on a voyage from Saint John, New Brunswick to Liverpool, Lancashire.

== 13 June ==
List of shipwrecks: 13 June 1843
Ship	State	Description
Velocity	United Kingdom	The ship struck the Crow Rock, in the Irish Sea off the coast of Pembrokeshire and sank. Her crew were rescued. She was on a voyage from Barrow-in-Furness, Lancashire to Cardiff, Glamorgan.

== 14 June ==
List of shipwrecks: 14 June 1843
Ship	State	Description
Arichat	United Kingdom	The ship foundered in the English Channel 20 nautical miles (37 km) north east of Cherbourg, Seine-Inférieure, France. Her crew were rescued. She was on a voyage from Newcastle upon Tyne, Northumberland to Jersey, Channel Islands.
Naiad	Haiti	The ship ran aground at Port-au-Prince. She was on a voyage from Port-au-Prince to Gonaïves. She was refloated on 17 June.
Reform	United Kingdom	The ship ran aground on the Cleopatra Rocks, in the Irish Sea off the coast of Anglesey and was severely damaged. She was on a voyage from Newport, Monmouthshire to Bowling, Dunbartonshire. She was refloated and taken into Holyhead, Anglesey.

== 15 June ==
List of shipwrecks: 15 June 1843
Ship	State	Description
Fountain	United Kingdom	The ship ran aground and was severely damaged at Saint-Malo, Ille-et-Vilaine, France.

== 17 June ==
List of shipwrecks: 17 June 1843
Ship	State	Description
Abus	Hamburg	The ship was severely damaged by ice at Saint Petersburg, Russian Empire.
Eagle	United Kingdom	The ship was wrecked on Cape Sable Island, Nova Scotia, British North America with the loss of three of her crew. She was on a voyage from Liverpool, Lancashire to Saint John, New Brunswick, British North America.
Mercury	Stettin	The ship ran aground on the Goodwin Sands, Kent, United Kingdom and was abandoned. She was on a voyage from Memel, Prussia to Dieppe, Seine-Inférieure, France.
Providencia	Portugal	The barque was wrecked in the Babuyan Islands. Her crew were rescued.
Saladin	United Kingdom	The ship was severely damaged by ice. She was on a voyage from Hartlepool, County Durham to Onega, Russia. She put into Saint Petersburg.
St. Aubin	(United Kingdom of Great Britain and Ireland) Jersey	The ship was severely damaged by ice at Saint Petersburg.

== 18 June ==
List of shipwrecks: 18 June 1843
Ship	State	Description
Frances and Margaret	United Kingdom	The ship sprang a leak in the North Sea off Newbiggin-by-the-Sea, Northumberland and caught fire when her cargo of quicklime got wet. She was on a voyage from North Shields, County Durham to the Clyde. Frances and Margaret put back to North Shields.
Les Deux Adeles	France	The brig was wrecked on the Long Sand, in the North Sea off the coast of Essex, United Kingdom with the loss of two of her eight crew. Survivors were rescued by Rapid (United Kingdom). Les Deux Adeles was on a voyage from Newcastle upon Tyne, Northumberland, United Kingdom to Toulon, Var.
Lima	United Kingdom	The ship was driven ashore at Arkhangelsk, Russia.
Neptune	United Kingdom	The ship was driven ashore at Arkhangelsk.
Newton	United Kingdom	The ship foundered in the North Sea 20 nautical miles (37 km) south south east of Flamborough Head, Yorkshire. Her crew were rescued by Catherine (United Kingdom). She was on a voyage from Warkworth, Northumberland to London.
Ocean Queen	United Kingdom	The ship ran aground and was damaged on the Goodwin Sands, Kent. She was on a voyage from South Shields, County Durham to Nantes, Loire-Inférieure, France. She was refloated and taken into Ramsgate, Kent.
St. Theodor	Russia	The ship was driven ashore and severely damaged at Arkhangelsk.
Triton	United Kingdom	The ship was driven ashore at Arkhangelsk.

== 19 June ==
List of shipwrecks: 19 June 1843
Ship	State	Description
Amoy	United Kingdom	The ship ran aground on the Brake Sand, in the English Channel off the coast of Kent. She was on a voyage from Newcastle upon Tyne, Northumberland to Bombay, India. She was refloated and put into Portsmouth, Hampshire for repairs.
Emma	United Kingdom	The ship ran aground on the Muschel Schap, off the coast of County Durham.
Joseph and Victor	United Kingdom	The ship was wrecked at the Coringa Lighthouse, India. All on board were rescued. She was on a voyage from Île Bourbon to Calcutta, India.

== 21 June ==
List of shipwrecks: 21 June 1843
Ship	State	Description
Fulmar	United Kingdom	The ship was driven ashore at Troy, Ottoman Empire. She was later refloated.

== 24 June ==
List of shipwrecks: 24 June 1843
Ship	State	Description
Antilles	United Kingdom	The ship ran aground on the Falsterbo Reef, in the Baltic Sea. She was on a voyage from Matanzas, Cuba to Saint Petersburg, Russia. She was refloated on 27 June and taken into Helsingør, Denmark.
Eugenia	France	The ship was driven ashore at Ténès, Algeria. She was consequently condemned.
Hero	United Kingdom	The brig was driven ashore east of Calais, France. She was on a voyage from Leith, Lothian to Rouen, Seine-Inférieure, France. She was consequently condemned.

== 25 June ==
List of shipwrecks: 25 June 1843
Ship	State	Description
HMS Fantome	Royal Navy	The brig-sloop ran aground on the Las Pepas Reef, off Colonia del Sacramento, Uruguay. Her crew were rescued. She had been taken into Colonia del Sacramento by 15 July, described as "in a shattered state".
L'Aigrette	France	The barque was wrecked at Maldonado, Uruguay with the loss of fourteen of her crew.

== 26 June ==
List of shipwrecks: 26 June 1843
Ship	State	Description
Amphitrite	United Kingdom	The ship was wrecked on the English Bank, off the coast of Uruguay. Her crew were rescued.
James	United Kingdom	The ship struck rocks off the Orkney Islands and was wrecked. Her crew were rescued. She was on a voyage from South Shields, County Durham to Quebec City, Province of Canada, British North America.
Leda	United Kingdom	The ship ran aground off Landskrona, Sweden. She was on a voyage from Danzig to an Englisn port. She was refloated and taken into Landskrona for repairs.

== 27 June ==
List of shipwrecks: 27 June 1843
Ship	State	Description
Isabel	United Kingdom	The ship sprang a leak and foundered in the North Sea. Her crew were rescued by Arthur (United Kingdom). Isabel was on a voyage from Montrose, Forfarshire to Riga, Russia.

== 28 June ==
List of shipwrecks: 28 June 1843
Ship	State	Description
Addingham	United Kingdom	The ship departed from Newcastle, New South Wales. Subsequently destroyed by fire in the Strait of Magellan. Her crew survived. Wreck discovered 14 October.

== 29 June ==
List of shipwrecks: 29 June 1843
Ship	State	Description
Unity	United Kingdom	The ship sprang a leak and foundered in the Atlantic Ocean 10 nautical miles (19 km) north of Newquay, Cornwall. Her crew survived. She was on a voyage from St. Ives, Cornwall to Cardiff, Glamorgan.

== 30 June ==
List of shipwrecks: 30 June 1843
Ship	State	Description
Emerald	United States	The ship capsized in the Atlantic Ocean off "Guy's Head" with the loss of all but two of her crew. She was on a voyage from Norfolk, Virginia to Eastport, Maine.

== Unknown date ==
List of shipwrecks: Unknown date in June 1843
Ship	State	Description
Carl	Sweden	The ship was wrecked at "Mariom". She was on a voyage from "Mariom" to Gothenburg.
Cosmopolite	United Kingdom	The ship was wrecked on Langlade Island before 9 June. Her crew were rescued. She was on a voyage from Quebec City, Province of Canada, British North America to Padstow, Cornwall.
Favourite	United Kingdom	The ship was driven ashore whilst on a voyage from Vizigapatam to Madras, India. All on board were rescued.
Harmony	United Kingdom	The ship capsized in the North Sea off the coast of Forfarshire before 10 June with the loss of all hands.
Heinrich	Denmark	The ship sprang a leak and foundered off Nantes, Loire-Inférieure, France. Her crew were rescued.
Isabella	United Kingdom	The ship ran aground and was damaged on the Herd Sand, in the North Sea off the coast of County Durham before 8 June. She was refloated on 10 June and towed into North Shields, County Durham.
Joseph and Victor	United Kingdom	The ship was wrecked near Madras before 19 June. All on board were rescued. She was on a voyage from Île Bourbon to Calcutta, India.
Lord	United Kingdom	The brig was abandoned in the Atlantic Ocean west of Ireland before 10 June.
