= List of shipwrecks in March 1822 =

The list of shipwrecks in March 1822 includes some ships sunk, foundered, grounded, or otherwise lost during March 1822.

== 1 March ==
List of shipwrecks: 1 March 1822
Ship	State	Description
Britannia	United Kingdom	The ship was driven ashore at Greenore Point, County Wexford. She was on a voyage from Swansea, Glamorgan to Wexford.
Clyde	United Kingdom	The schooner was wrecked on the west coast of Berbice with the loss of three lives. She was on a voyage from Berbice to Demerara.
Emma	United Kingdom	The ship was wrecked at Stavanger, Norway. Her crew were rescued.
John	United Kingdom	The sloop was driven ashore at Fraserburgh, Aberdeenshire.
Lively	United Kingdom	The ship ran aground on the Herd Sand, in the North Sea off the coast of County Durham and sank. She was on a voyage from Pittenweem, Fife to Newcastle upon Tyne, Northumberland. Lively was later refloated and taken in to South Shields, County Durham.

== 2 March ==
List of shipwrecks: 2 March 1822
Ship	State	Description
Laurel	United Kingdom	The ship was wrecked on the Île-à-Vache, Haiti. She was on a voyage from Jacmel, Haiti to London.
Ruth	United Kingdom	The schooner was wrecked on Long Island, New York, United States. She was on a voyage from Demerara to Saint John, New Brunswick, British North America.

== 3 March ==
List of shipwrecks: 3 March 1822
Ship	State	Description
Ajax	United Kingdom	The ship, bound for Malta, put back to Calcutta leaky, and was condemned.
Ann	United Kingdom	The ship was driven ashore on Skagen, Denmark. She was on a voyage from South Shields, County Durham to Swinemünde, Prussia. Ann was later refloated and taken in to a Swedish port for repairs.

== 4 March ==
List of shipwrecks: 4 March 1822
Ship	State	Description
John & George	United Kingdom	The ship was wrecked on Rottum, Groningen, Netherlands.

== 5 March ==
List of shipwrecks: 5 March 1822
Ship	State	Description
Active	United Kingdom	The brig was driven ashore near Workington, Cumberland.
Ant	United Kingdom	The brig was driven ashore in Loch Indaal. She was on a voyage from Liverpool, Lancashire to Galway.
Brothers	United Kingdom	The ship was driven ashore at Kirkcudbright.
Catherine	United Kingdom	The ship was driven ashore and wrecked at Westport, County Mayo. She was on a voyage from Westport to Liverpool.
HMRC Defence	Board of Customs	The cutter was driven ashore at Allonby, Cumberland.
Defiance	United Kingdom	The ship was driven ashore north of Maryport, Cumberland.
Dido	United Kingdom	The brig was wrecked at Kirkcudbright. Her crew were rescued. She was on a voyage from Harrington, Cumberland to Dublin.
Dove	United Kingdom	The brig was driven ashore and wrecked at Red Nose Point, Parton, Cumberland with the loss of three of her crew.
Eliza & Jean	United Kingdom	The sloop was wrecked at Lamlash, Isle of Arran. She was on a voyage from Glasgow, Renfrewshire to Stranraer, Wigtownshire.
Falcon	United Kingdom	The brig was driven ashore at Kirkcudbright with the loss of two of her seven crew.
Fanny	United Kingdom	The brig was driven ashore near Workington.
Hebe	United Kingdom	The brig was driven ashore near Maryport.
Hope	United Kingdom	The ship was driven ashore at Maryport.
Hope	United Kingdom	The schooner was driven ashore at Kirkcudbright.
Jenny	United Kingdom	The schooner was driven ashore at Kirkcudbright.
John Craig	United Kingdom	The brig was driven ashore at Whitehaven. She was on a voyage from Liverpool to Lisbon, Portugal.
Joshua	United Kingdom	The snow was wrecked at Kirkcudbright with the loss of all hands. She was on a voyage rom Whitehaven to Dublin
Lady Elizabeth	United Kingdom	The ship was driven ashore at Kirkcudbright.
Lune	United Kingdom	The ship was driven ashore in Bootle Bay. She was on a voyage from Berbice to Liverpool. Lune was refloated on 22 March and taken in to Liverpool.
Margaret	United Kingdom	The brig was driven ashore in Loch Indaal. She was on a voyage from Campbeltown, Argyllshire to Limerick.
Mary	United Kingdom	The brig was driven ashore near Maryport.
Mary	United Kingdom	The ship was driven ashore at Maryport with the loss of two of her crew.
Mary and Francis	United Kingdom	The ship was driven ashore at Kirkcudbright.
Mary and Isabella	United Kingdom	The brig was wrecked at Beckfoot, Cumberland with the loss of all but one of her crew. She was on a voyage from Whitehaven to Dublin.
Matilda	United Kingdom	The East Indiaman was wrecked in Sangor Bay, Cape of Good Hope. Her crew survived. She was on a voyage from London to Bengal, India.
Mentor	United Kingdom	The ship was lost in Mount's Bay with the loss of a crew member. She was on a voyage from São Miguel Island, Azores, Portugal to London.
Mermaid	United Kingdom	The ship was driven ashore in Loch Indaal. She was on a voyage from Liverpool to Galway.
Orion	United States	The ship was driven ashore in Loch Indaal. She was on a voyage from New Orleans, Louisiana to the Clyde.
Recovery	United Kingdom	The ship was driven ashore at Kirkcudbright.
Speedwell	United Kingdom	The ship was driven ashore at Kirkcudbright.
Wellington	United Kingdom	The schooner was wrecked at Kirkcudbright.

== 6 March ==
List of shipwrecks: 6 March 1822
Ship	State	Description
Adventure	United Kingdom	The ship was driven ashore and damaged at Ramsgate, Kent. She was on a voyage from London to Rouen, Seine-Inférieure, France. Adventure was later refloated and taken in to Ramsgate for repairs.
Ant	United Kingdom	The ship was driven ashore in Loch Indaal. She was on a voyage from Liverpool, Lancashire to Galway.
Drey Gebruder	Bremen	The ship was wrecked in the Eider. Her crew were rescued. She was on a voyage from Brement to a Baltic port.
Heart of Oak	United Kingdom	The schooner foundered in the North Sea off Whitstable, Kent with the loss of two of her crew.
Hoppet	(Russian Empire) Grand Duchy of Finland	The ship was wrecked at Ulverston, Lancashire, United Kingdom of Great Britain and Ireland. She was on a voyage from Liverpool to Helsingfors.
Margaret	United Kingdom	The ship was driven ashore in Loch Indaal. She was on a voyage from Campbeltown, Argyllshire to Limerick.
Mary Ann	United Kingdom	The ship was wrecked at Corry, Isle of Skye. She was on a voyage from Liverpool to Sligo.
Melville	United Kingdom	The ship was abandoned in the North Sea off Flamborough Head, Yorkshire. Her crew were rescued by Defence )United Kingdom). Melville was on a voyage from Newcastle upon Tyne, Northumberland to Lisbon, Portugal
Mermaid	United Kingdom	The ship was driven ashore in Loch Indaal. She was on a voyage from Liverpool to Sligo.
Oronoco	United Kingdom	The ship was driven ashore at Kingsdown, Kent. She was refloated but consequently foundered off the Gull Lightship ( Trinity House). Oronoco was on a voyage from Demerara to London.
William	United Kingdom	The ship foundered in the North Sea off the coast of Norfolk. Her crew were rescued by Peace (United Kingdom).

== 7 March ==
List of shipwrecks: 7 March 1822
Ship	State	Description
Charlotta	Hamburg	The ship departed from Hamburg for Messina, Sicily. No further trace, presumed foundered with the loss of all hands.
Elegant	United Kingdom	The collier, a brig, was wrecked on the Rough Sand, in the North Sea with the loss of eight of her nine crew. The survivor was rescued by Hero (United Kingdom).
Fanny	United Kingdom	The ship foundered in the Irish Sea off Blackpool, Lancashire. All on board were rescued. She was on a voyage from Liverpool to Belfast, County Antrim.
Robert	United Kingdom	The whaler was wrecked in the New South Shetland Islands.
Sea Gull	United Kingdom	The ship was driven ashore and wrecked on the Isle of Skye. She was on a voyage from Liverpool, Lancashire to Lerwick, Shetland Islands.

== 8 March ==
List of shipwrecks: 8 March 1822
Ship	State	Description
Alida Jantina	Netherlands	The ship was driven ashore on Texel, North Holland. She was on a voyage from Bordeaux, Gironde, France to Amsterdam, North Holland.
Betsey	United Kingdom	The ship was abandoned in the North Sea. Her crew were rescued by the fishing smack Britannia (United Kingdom). Betsey was on a voyage from South Shields, County Durham to London.
Flora	Prussia	The ship was driven ashore and wrecked on South Ronaldsay, Orkney Islands, United Kingdom. She was on a voyage from Liverpool, Lancashire, United Kingdom to Königsburg.
Florida	United States	The ship was driven ashore on Texel. She was on a voyage from Amsterdam to St. Ubes, Portugal.
Johann	Netherlands	The ship was driven ashore and wrecked on Texel. She was on a voyage from Amsterdam to Batavia, Netherlands East Indies.
Lavinia	United Kingdom	The ship was driven ashore near Wigtown with the loss of three or four of her crew. She was on a voyage from Demerara to Belfast, County Antrim.
Leda	United States	The ship was driven ashore and wrecked on Texel. She was on a voyage from Amsterdam to Baltimore, Maryland.
Martha	United Kingdom	The ship foundered in the Irish Sea off "Craton Head" with the loss of nine of the ten people on board. She was on a voyage from Waterford to Liverpool, Lancashire.
Martha	United States	The ship was driven ashore on Texel. She was on a voyage from New York to Amsterdam
Neptunus	Netherlands	The ship was driven ashore on Texel. She was on a voyage from Amsterdam to Port-au-Prince, Haiti.
Three Brothers	Netherlands	The ship foundered off Texel. She was on a voyage from Amsterdam to Havre de Grâce, Seine-Inférieure, France.
Verhildersum	Netherlands	The ship was driven ashore and severely damaged on Texel. She was on a voyage from Amsterdam to Lisbon, Portugal.
Vriendschap	United Kingdom	The ship was driven ashore on Texel. She was later refloated. Vriendschap was on a voyage from Amsterdam to St. Thomas, Virgin Islands.
William	United Kingdom	The ship was driven ashore on Texel. She was on a voyage from Amsterdam to Liverpool, Lancashire.
William Penn	United States	The ship was driven ashore on Texel. She was on a voyage from Amsterdam to St. Ubes.

== 9 March ==
List of shipwrecks: 9 March 1822
Ship	State	Description
Argo	United Kingdom	The ship was abandoned in the Atlantic Ocean with the loss of two of her crew. Survivors were rescued by Illinois (United States). She was on a voyage from Saint John, New Brunswick, British North America to Liverpool, Lancashire.
Bee	United Kingdom	The ship was driven ashore at Shoeburyness, Essex. She was refloated in mid-April.
Catherine	United Kingdom	The sloop sank at Irvine, Ayrshire.
Charlotte	United Kingdom	The ship was driven ashore at Helensburgh, Renfrewshire.
James and Margaret	United Kingdom	The ship was driven ashore on South Ronaldsay, Orkney Islands, She was on a voyage from Aberdeen to New York, United States.
Peggy	United Kingdom	The ship was run down and sunk by Britannia (United Kingdom) in the Firth of Clyde 3 nautical miles (5.6 km) off Pladda. She was on a voyage from Glasgow, Renfrewshire to Dublin.

== 10 March ==
List of shipwrecks: 10 March 1822
Ship	State	Description
Angelina	United Kingdom	The ship was driven ashore at Port Glasgow, Renfrewshire. She was on a voyage from Belfast, County Antrim to Charleston, South Carolina, United States.
Calcutta	United States	The brig was driven ashore and wrecked on Folly Island, South Carolina. She was on a voyage from Amsterdam, North Holland, Netherlands to Boston, Massachusetts.
Charlotte	United Kingdom	The brig was driven ashore and wrecked at Helensburgh, Dunbartonshire. She was on a voyage from Belfast, County Antrim to Jamaica.
Dunkirk	France	The brig ran aground on the Florida Reef and was abandoned by her crew. She was on a voyage from Campeche, Mexico to Havre de Grâce, Seine-Inférieure.
Eleanor	United Kingdom	The ship was wrecked at Icacos Point, Trinidad. Her crew survived. She was on a voyage from Saint Thomas, Virgin Islands to Havana, Cuba.
Faken	Norway	The ship was driven ashore and wrecked at Helsingør, Denmark.
Massachusetts	United States	The ship was driven ashore on Eierland, North Holland, Netherlands. She was on a voyage from Charleston, South Carolina to Hamburg.
Stark	United Kingdom)	The ship was lost off Lerwick, Shetland Islands with the loss of all hands. She was on a voyage from Liverpool, Lancashire to Rostock.
Tasso	United Kingdom	The brig was driven ashore crewless at Dingle, County Kerry. She was on a voyage from Miramichi Bay to Liverpool.
Vrow Jopkins	Netherlands	The ship foundered in the North Sea off Egmond aan Zee, North Holland. Her crew were rescued.

== 11 March ==
List of shipwrecks: 11 March 1822
Ship	State	Description
Actif	Netherlands	The ship was driven ashore at Bergen, Norway. She was on a voyage from Antwerp to Aberdeen, United Kingdom. Activ was refloated on 22 April and taken in to Bergen.
Black Prince	United Kingdom	The ship was lost at the mouth of the Eider. Her crew were rescued. She was on a voyage from Newcastle upon Tyne, Northumberland to Littlehampton, Sussex.
Cremonmogate	United Kingdom	The ship was driven ashore at "Robsnout", Jutland. She was on a voyage from Aberdeen to Riga, Russia. Cremongate was refloated on 27 July and resumed her voyage.
Gottfried	Hamburg	The ship was driven ashore at the mouth of the Eider with the loss of all but one of her crew. She was on a voyage from Trieste to Hamburg.
Henry	United Kingdom	The ship was driven ashore near "Torko". She was on a voyage from Newcastle upon Tyne to Memel, Prussia.
Johanna	United Kingdom	The ship was wrecked on a reef off Rocky Point, Jamaica.
Ladies Adventure	United Kingdom	The schooner was driven ashore and severely damaged at Lerwick, Shetland Islands.
Lord Fife	United Kingdom	The ship was driven ashore and wrecked at Lerwick.
Margaret	Hamburg	The ship foundered in the North Sea off the coast of Friesland, Netherlands. She was on a voyage from Hamburg to Amsterdam, North Holland, Netherlands.
Three Brodre	Norway	The galiot was driven ashore on the Swedish coast.
Trelawney	United Kingdom	The ship was wrecked at Montego Bay, Jamaica.
William	United Kingdom	The ship was driven ashore at Kungsbacka, Sweden. She was on a voyage from Hull, Yorkshire to Riga, Russia.

== 12 March ==
List of shipwrecks: 12 March 1822
Ship	State	Description
Ceres	United Kingdom	The brig was wrecked on the Middle Sand, in the North Sea. Her crew were rescued.
Herstelling	Netherlands	The ship departed from Demerara for Amsterdam, North Holland. No further trace, presumed foundered with the loss of all hands.

== 13 March ==
List of shipwrecks: 13 March 1822
Ship	State	Description
Ceres	United Kingdom	The brig was wrecked on the Middle Sand, in the North Sea off the coast of Essex. Her crew were rescued.
Diana	Portugal	The ship foundered in the Atlantic Ocean off the coast of Brazil, Her crew survived. She was on a voyage from Porto to Rio de Janeiro, Brazil.
Elizabeth	Portugal	The ship was wrecked on Cape Recife, Africa. Her crew were rescued. She was on a voyage from Algoa Bay to Table Bay.
Falmouth	United States	The ship was wrecked on the Exumer Keys.
Hero	United Kingdom	The ship was driven ashore at Demerara. She was on a voyage from Demerara to London. Hero was refloated on 15 March and proceeded on her voyage.
James Fitzpatrick	United Kingdom	The ship was driven ashore at Youghall, County Cork.
Mary & Isabella	United Kingdom	The ship ran aground at North Shields, County Durham. She was later refloated.
Redlap	United Kingdom	The ship was driven ashore at Saltdean Gap, Sussex. She was on a voyage from Messina, Sicily to Amsterdam, North Holland, Netherlands. Redlap was declared a total loss. She was refloated on 22 March and taken in to Newhaven, Sussex.
Twey Gebroeders	Netherlands	The ship was driven ashore near "Tedderwarden". Her crew were rescued. She was on a voyage from Bremen to Amsterdam.

== 14 March ==
List of shipwrecks: 14 March 1822
Ship	State	Description
Actif	France	The ship was lost off Guernsey, Channel Islands. She was on a voyage from Morlaix, Finistère to London, United Kingdom.
Helen	United Kingdom	The ship was abandoned in the North Sea 30 nautical miles (56 km) west of Heligoland. Her crew were rescued by a Hamburg whaler. Helen was on a voyage from Newcastle upon Tyne, Northumberland to London.
William	United Kingdom	The ship was driven ashore in Kongsbacka Bay. She was on a voyage from Hull to Riga, Russia.

== 15 March ==
List of shipwrecks: 15 March 1822
Ship	State	Description
Fairless	United Kingdom	The ship was lost near "Waarde", Jutland. She was on a voyage from Newcastle upon Tyne, Northumberland to Bremen.
Felicity	United Kingdom	The ship was driven ashore near Calais, France. She was on a voyage from Waterford to London. Felicity was later refloated and taken in to Calais.
Freden	Sweden	The ship was driven ashore on Saltholm, Denmark. She was on a voyage from Malmö to Stockholm.

== 16 March ==
List of shipwrecks: 16 March 1822
Ship	State	Description
General Brock	United States	The ship was driven ashore near Wilmington, Delaware. She was later refloated.
Gertrude	Bremen	The ship was driven ashore near "Lac Mata", Spain. She was on a voyage from Cette, Hérault, France to Bremen. Gertrude was refloated on 18 March and taken in to Alicante, Spain for repairs.
Jonge Albert	Netherlands	The ship was driven ashore on the Île de Batz, Finistère, France. She was on a voyage from Cette, Hérault, France to Antwerp.

== 17 March ==
List of shipwrecks: 17 March 1822
Ship	State	Description
Felicity	United Kingdom	The ship was driven ashore 7 nautical miles (13 km) west of Calais, France. She was on a voyage from Waterford to London.
Jane	United Kingdom	The ship was driven ashore near "Robsnout", Jutland and was abandoned by her crew.
Margaret	United Kingdom	The ship was driven ashore on Walney Island, Cumberland. She was on a voyage from the Isle of Man to Liverpool, Lancashire. Margaret was refloated on 19 March but drove shore again on 21 March and was wrecked.

== 18 March ==
List of shipwrecks: 18 March 1822
Ship	State	Description
Ann	United Kingdom	The ship was driven ashore at Ambleteuse, Pas-de-Calais, France. She was on a voyage from Southampton, Hampshire to Newcastle upon Tyne, Northumberland.
Lady Warren	United Kingdom	The ship was wrecked on the Burrow of Ballyteague. She was on a voyage from Porto, Portugal to Dublin.
Snelheid	Netherlands	The ship was driven ashore at Ostend. She was on a voyage from Bayonne, Basses-Pyrénées France to Ostend. Snelheid was refloated the next day but sank. Her crew were rescued.
Sorpesa	Spanish Navy	The brigantine was driven ashore and wrecked between Rota and Chipiona. Her crew were rescued. She was on a voyage from Havana, Cuba to Cádiz.
Swiftsure	United Kingdom	The steamship ran aground on a sandbank and was damaged. She was on a voyage from King's Lynn, Norfolk to London. Swiftsure was refloated and taken in to Harwich, Essex.

== 19 March ==
List of shipwrecks: 19 March 1822
Ship	State	Description
Aid	United Kingdom	The ship was driven ashore and wrecked near Burghead, Morayshire. She was on a voyage from "Ballintraad" to London.

== 20 March ==
List of shipwrecks: 20 March 1822
Ship	State	Description
Margaret	United Kingdom	The ship was driven ashore on the Isle of Walney, Cumberland. She was on a voyage from Ramsey, Isle of Man to Liverpool, Lancashire.

== 21 March ==
List of shipwrecks: 21 March 1822
Ship	State	Description
Alert	United Kingdom	The ship was driven ashore near Memel, Prussia. She was on a voyage from London to Memel.
Brothers	United Kingdom	The sloop was wrecked whilst on a voyage from Bristol, Gloucestershire to Conwy, Caernarfonshire.
Brutus	United Kingdom	The ship was driven ashore and wrecked on Læsø, Denmark. Her crew were rescued. She was on a voyage from Hull, Yorkshire to Riga, Russia.

== 23 March ==
List of shipwrecks: 23 March 1822
Ship	State	Description
Garland	United Kingdom	The ship was wrecked at Karlskrona, Sweden with the loss of five of her nine crew. She was on a voyage from Sunderland, County Durham to Riga, Russia.
Partridge	United Kingdom	The ship was driven ashore near Memel, Prussia. She was on a voyage from Newcastle upon Tyne, Northumberland to Memel.

== 24 March ==
List of shipwrecks: 24 March 1822
Ship	State	Description
Linen Hall	United Kingdom	The ship was wrecked on the Arklow Bank, in the Irish Sea off the coast of County Wexford. Her crew were rescued. She was on a voyage from Dublin to London.

== 25 March ==
List of shipwrecks: 25 March 1822
Ship	State	Description
Hound	United Kingdom	The ship was driven ashore on Gotland, Sweden. She was on a voyage from Memel, Prussia to Hull, Yorkshire. Hound was later refloated and taken in to Ronehamn.
Rambler	United Kingdom	The ship departed from Saint John, New Brunswick, British North America for Demerara. No further trace, presumed foundered with the loss of all hands.
São Joao Baptista	Portugal	The ship was run down and sunk off St. Ubes by Perola (Portugal). Her crew were rescued by Perola. São Joao Baptista was on a voyage from St. Ubes to Porto.

== 26 March ==
List of shipwrecks: 26 March 1822
Ship	State	Description
Don Amigos	Spain	The ship was driven ashore at Cádiz. She was on a voyage from Puerto Rico to a port in Catalonia.
Santa Cristo de la Sud	Spain	The ship was driven ashore and wrecked at Cádiz. She was on a voyage from Gibraltar to Cádiz.

== 27 March ==
List of shipwrecks: 27 March 1822
Ship	State	Description
Volusia	United Kingdom	The ship was driven ashore near Wells-next-the-Sea, Norfolk. She was on a voyage from King's Lynn Norfolk to London. She was refloated on 29 March and taken in to Wells-next-the-Sea.

== 28 March ==
List of shipwrecks: 28 March 1822
Ship	State	Description
Wear	United Kingdom	The ship was sunk by ice. Her eleven crew survived.

== 30 March ==
List of shipwrecks: 30 March 1822
Ship	State	Description
Betsey	United Kingdom	The ship was driven ashore and wrecked near Mundesley, Norfolk with the loss of all nut one of her crew.
Bird	United Kingdom	The brig was driven ashore and wrecked near Mundesley weith the loss of all hands.

== 31 March ==
List of shipwrecks: 31 March 1822
Ship	State	Description
Betsey	United Kingdom	The ship was driven ashore and wrecked 1 nautical mile (1.9 km) south of Mundesley, Norfolk with the loss of all but one of her crew.
Bird	United Kingdom	The brig was driven ashore and wrecked at Mundesley with the loss of all hands.
James and Francis	United Kingdom	The ship was driven ashore at Horsey, Norfolk. She was on a voyage from London to Selby, Yorkshire.
John and Robert	United Kingdom	The ship was driven ashore and wrecked on the north coast of Jersey, Channel Islands. She was on a voyage from New Brunswick, British North America to Liverpool, Lancashire.
Lady Hood	United Kingdom	The ship was driven ashore and damaged at Campbeltown, Argyllshire. She was on a voyage from the Clyde to Livorno, Grand Duchy of Tuscany and Naples, Kingdom of the Two Sicilies. Lady Hood was later refloated and taken in to Campbeltown for repairs.
McDuff	United Kingdom	The ship was driven ashore near Alnmouth, Northumberland. She was on a voyage from Bo'ness, Lothian to London.
Myrtle	United Kingdom	The ship was driven ashore in the Weser.
Salus	United Kingdom	The ship was driven ashore at Cuxhaven. She was on a voyage from Hamburg to London. Salus was later refloated and taken in to Cuxhaven.
Scipio	United Kingdom	The ship was driven ashore and damaged at Liverpool. She was on a voyage from Liverpool to Virginia, United States. She was refloated later that day.
Thetis	United Kingdom	The ship was driven ashore and severely damaged at Cuxhaven. She was on a voyage from Hamburg to London. Thetis was later refloated and taken in to Cuxhaven.

=== Unknown date ===
List of shipwrecks: Unknown date in March 1822
Ship	State	Description
Ann	United Kingdom	The ship was driven ashore near Tunis, Tunisia and was abandoned by her crew. She was on a voyage from Malta to an English port.
Auguste	Hamburg	The ship was driven ashore in the Elbe. She was on a voyage from Bahia, Brazil to Hamburg.
Chance	United Kingdom	The ship was driven ashore 2 nautical miles (3.7 km) north of Bovenbergen, Denmark. She was on a voyage from Hamburg to London.
Carl Johnan	Sweden	The ship was severely damaged or sunk at Stavanger, Norway between 8 and 15 March.
Diana	Sweden	The ship was severely damaged or sunk at Stavanger between 8 and 15 March.
Edward	Russia	The ship was severely damaged or sunk at Stavanger between 8 and 15 March.
Elizabeth	United Kingdom	The ship was driven ashore on Scio, Greece. She was on a voyage from Salonica, Greece to Smyrna, Ottoman Empire.
Exertion	United States	The schooner was captured by pirates and destroyed.
Felicity	United Kingdom	The ship was driven ashore in Loch Indaal in early March. She was on a voyage from London to Sligo.
Five Brothers	Russia	The ship was severely damaged or sunk at Stavanger between 8 and 15 March.
Four Friends	United Kingdom	The ship foundered in the North Sea. Her crew were rescued by Request (United Kingdom). She was on a voyage from South Shields, County Durham to London.
Graff Bernstoff	Russia	The ship was driven ashore and severely damaged near "Egvod", Norway. She was later refloated.
Hope	United Kingdom	The ship was driven ashore in Loch Indaal in early March. She was on a voyage from Liverpool, Lancashire to Limerick.
Horizon	United States	The ship was driven ashore near "Udoe", Norway. She was on a voyage from Hamburg to New York. Horizon was later refloated and taken in to Christiansand.
Indefatigable	United Kingdom	The ship was driven ashore and wrecked near Liebau, Prussia.
Isabella	United Kingdom	The ship was abandoned in the North Sea before 14 March. She was on a voyage from Gothenburg, Sweden to Leith, Lothian.
Janet	United Kingdom	The ship was driven ashore in Loch Indaal in early March. She was on a voyage from Liverpool to Dundalk, County Louth.
John	United Kingdom	The ship was wrecked at Kinnaird Head, Aberdeenshire. Her crew were rescued. She was on a voyage from Macduff, Aberdeenshire to the Firth of Forth.
John & Mary	United Kingdom	The ship was abandoned in the North Sea before 14 March. Her crew were rescued by Dee (United Kingdom). John & Mary was on a voyage from Newcastle upon Tyne. Northumberland to King's Lynn, Norfolk.
Kelvin	United Kingdom	The sloop was wrecked on North Uist, Orkney Islands with the loss of all hands. She was on a voyage from Westport, County Mayo to Liverpool.
Kron Prindsen von Denmark	Norway	The ship foundered in the North Sea off Bergen, She was on a voyage from Bergen to Trieste.
Marianne Henrietta	Sweden	The ship was severely damaged or sunk at Stavanger between 8 and 15 March.
Mary	United Kingdom	The ship was wrecked on Bornholm, Denmark. She was on a voyage from London to Memel, Prussia.
Messenger	United Kingdom	The ship foundered off Skagen, Denmark.
Nancy	United Kingdom	The ship was driven ashore in Loch Indaal. She was on a voyage from Belfast, County Antrim to Londonderry.
Perseverance	United States	The ship was driven ashore in Loch Indaal in early March. She was on a voyage from New York to Londonderry.
Pulteney	(United Kingdom of Great Britain and Ireland) Guernsey	The ship was wrecked on Sylt, Duchy of Schleswig. She was on a voyage from Guernsey to Hamburg.
Resolution	United Kingdom	The ship was driven ashore in Loch Indaal in early March. She was on a voyage from Liverpool to Greenock, Renfrewshire.
St. Ives	United Kingdom	The ship was driven ashore and wrecked at Pontrieux, Côtes-du-Nord, France in early March.
St. Johannes	Norway	The ship sank at "Tannager", Norway
Superb	United States	The ship foundered in the Atlantic Ocean off Land's End, Cornwall, United Kingdom.
Thistle	United Kingdom	The whaler was driven ashore in Loch Indaal in early March.
Triunfante	Malta	The ship was lost at Alexandria, Egypt.
William	United Kingdom	The ship was driven ashore in Kongsbakka Bay. She was on a voyage from Hull, Yorkshire to Riga, Russia. William was later refloated.
William	United Kingdom	The ship was driven ashore in the Eider. She was on a voyage from Glasgow, Renfrewshire to Hamburg. William was refloated on 24 March and taken in to Tönningen, Duchy of Holstein for repairs.
