= HMS Carnatic (1783) =

Ship of the line of the Royal Navy

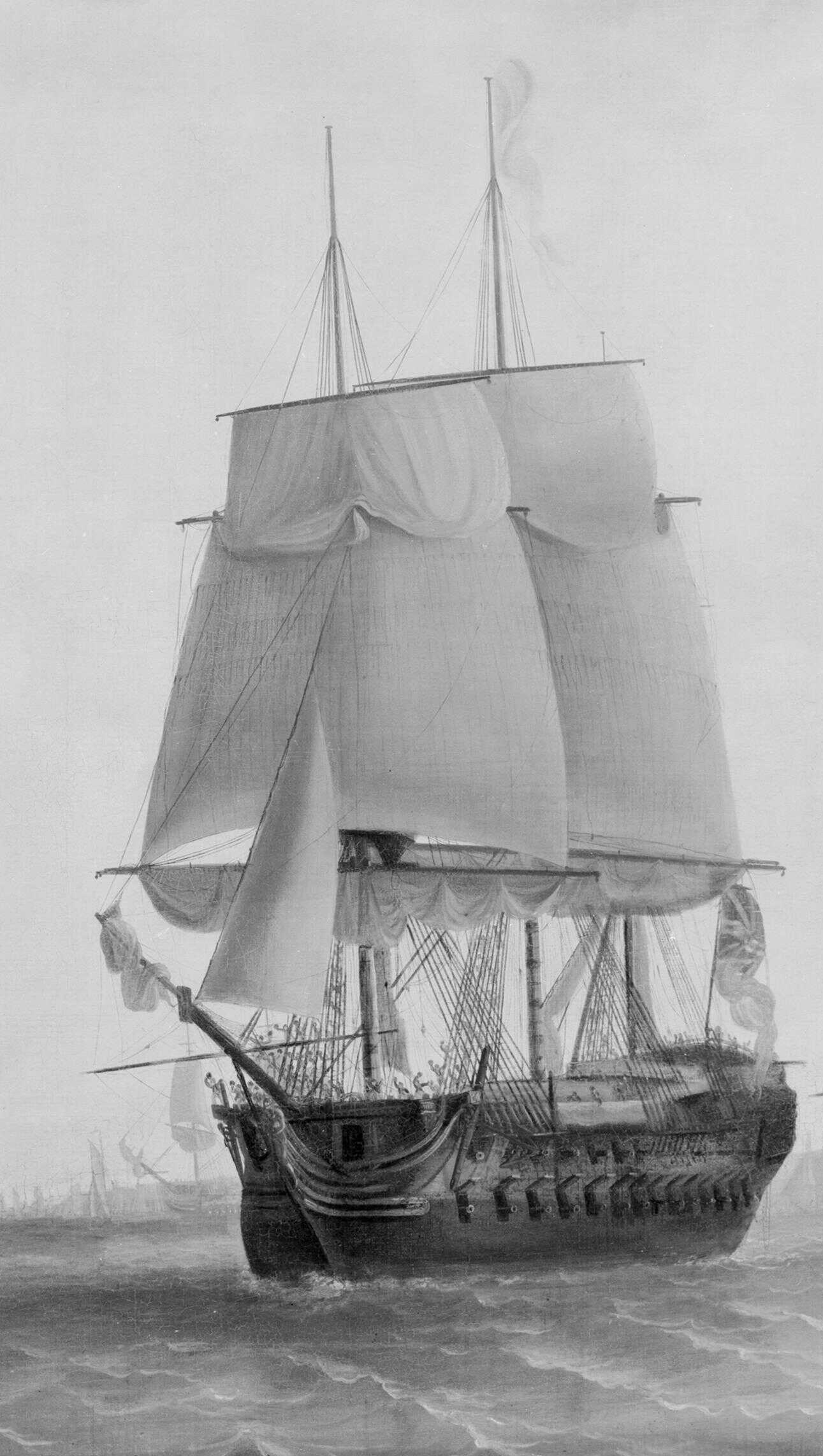
- HMS Carnatic off Plymouth, 18 August 1789

History

Great Britain
- Name: HMS Carnatic
- Ordered: 14 July 1779
- Builder: Dudman, Deptford Wharf
- Laid down: March 1780
- Launched: 21 January 1783
- Renamed: HMS Captain, 1815
- Fate: Broken up, 1825

General characteristics
- Class & type: Courageux-class ship of the line
- Tons burthen: 171930/94 (bm)
- Length: 172 ft 4 1/2 in (52.5 m) (gundeck); 140 ft 5 1/4 in (42.8 m) (keel)
- Beam: 48 ft 0 in (14.6 m)
- Depth of hold: 20 ft 9 1/2 in (6.337 m)
- Propulsion: Sails
- Sail plan: Full-rigged ship
- Armament: Gundeck: 28 × 32-pounder guns; Upper gundeck: 28 × 18-pounder guns; QD: 14 × 9-pounder guns; Fc: 4 × 9-pounder guns

HMS Carnatic was a 74-gun third rate ship of the line of the Royal Navy, launched on 21 January 1783 at Deptford Wharf. The British East India Company paid for her construction and presented her to the Royal Navy.

Sometime prior to 16 September 1799 the American schooner "Violet" was capsized and sunk by a waterspout at (27°30′N 62°00′W). 14 days later they were rescued by Carnatic. Four perished during the ordeal.

On 11 May 1801 she, in company with HMS Sans Pareil and HMS Cumberland, made contact with USS Ganges in the West Indies, Lat 22.01 N.

On 17 May 1815, the Admiralty renamed her HMS Captain. The ship was broken up on 30 September 1825.
