= HMS Aboukir (1807) =

Ship of the line of the Royal Navy

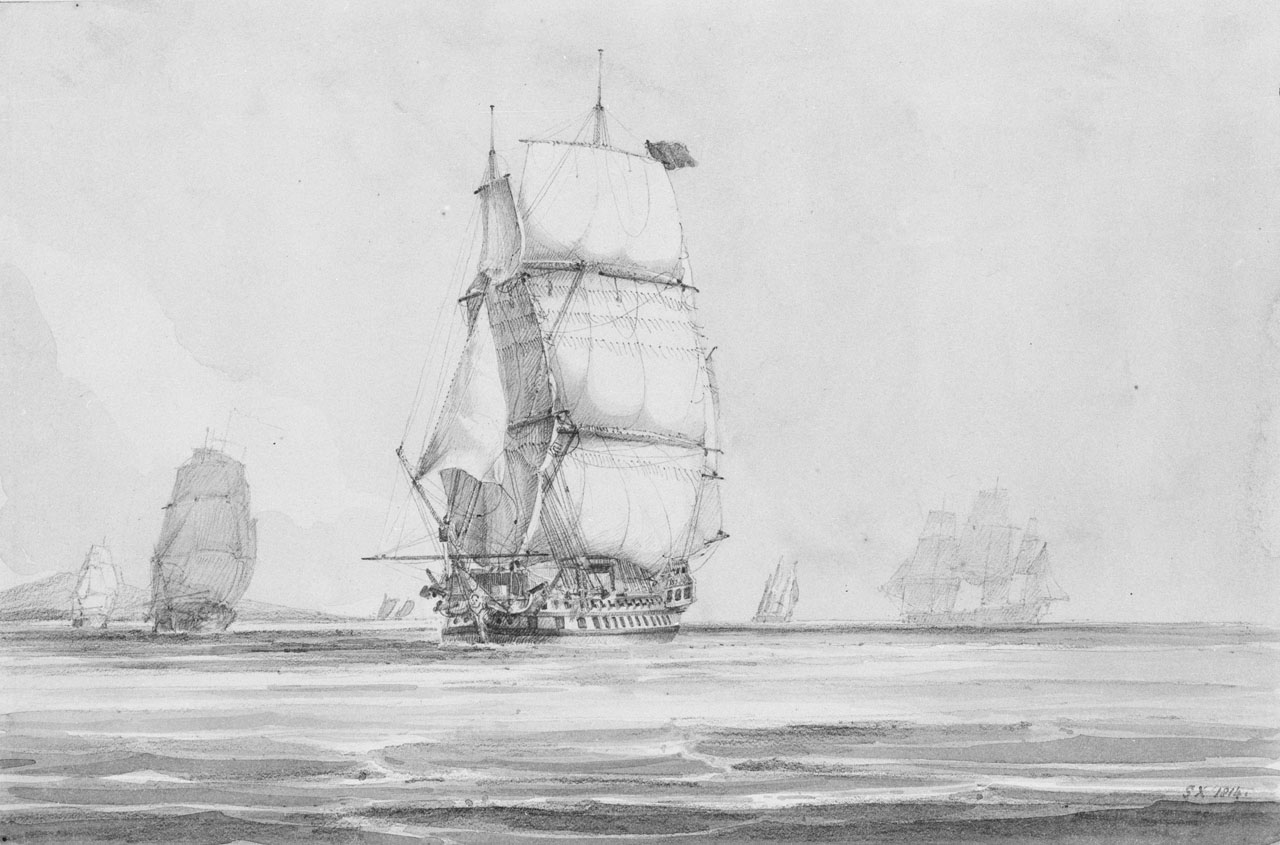
- A drawing of HMS Aboukir

History

United Kingdom
- Name: HMS Aboukir
- Ordered: 24 November 1802
- Builder: Brindley, Frindsbury
- Laid down: June 1804
- Launched: 18 November 1807
- Fate: Sold, 1838

General characteristics
- Class & type: Lengthened Courageux-class ship of the line
- Tons burthen: 1703 bm
- Length: 172 ft 3.5 in (52.515 m) (gundeck)
- Beam: 47 ft 9 in (14.55 m)
- Depth of hold: 20 ft 9 in (6.32 m)
- Propulsion: Sails
- Sail plan: Full-rigged ship
- Armament: 74 guns: Gundeck: 28 × 32-pounders; Upper gundeck: 28 × 18-pounders; Quarterdeck: 2 × 9-pounders; 12 × 32-pounder carronades; Forecastle: 2 × 9-pounders; 2 × 32-pounder carronades; Poop deck: 6 × 18-pounder carronades

HMS Aboukir was a 74-gun third-rate ship of the line of the Royal Navy, launched on 18 November 1807 at Frindsbury.

In 1812 Aboukir served as the flagship to Rear-Admiral Thomas Byam Martin in the Baltic Sea and participated in the defence of Riga.

She was placed on harbour service in 1824, and was sold in 1838.
