= Courageux-class ship of the line =

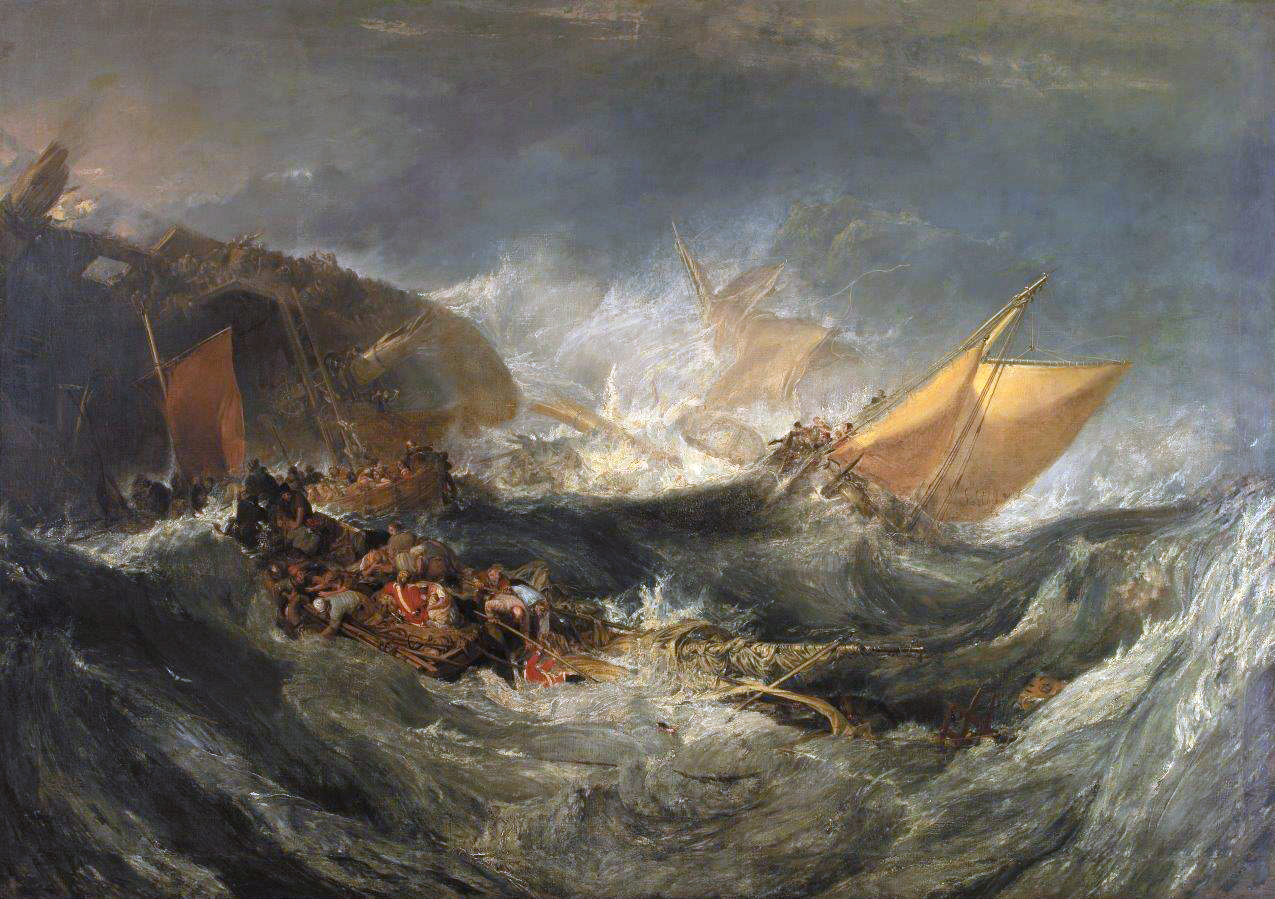
- The shipwreck of the Minotaur, depicted in The Wreck of a Transport Ship by J. M. W. Turner in 1810

Class overview
- Name: Courageux
- Operators: Royal Navy
- Preceded by: Ganges class
- Succeeded by: Mars class
- In service: 21 January 1783 – 1848
- Completed: 8
- Lost: 2

General characteristics
- Type: Ship of the line
- Length: Standard: 172 ft 3 in (52.5 m) (gundeck); 140 ft 5¼ in (42.8 m) (keel); Lengthened: 172 ft 3½ in (52.5 m) (gundeck); 140 ft 5¼ in (42.8 m) (keel); Modified: 180 ft (54.9 m) (gundeck); 147 ft 7 in (45 m) (keel)
- Beam: Standard, Lengthened: 47 ft 9 in (14.6 m); Modified: 48 ft ¾ in (14.6 m)
- Propulsion: Sails
- Armament: 74 guns: Gundeck: 28 × 32-pounders; Upper gundeck: 28 × 18-pounders; Quarterdeck: 14 × 9-pounders; Forecastle: 4 × 9-pounders
- Notes: Ships in class include: Carnatic, Colossus, Leviathan, Minotaur, Aboukir, Bombay, Blake, San Domingo

The Courageux-class ships of the line were a class of six 74-gun third rates of the Royal Navy. Their design was a direct copy of the French ship Courageux, captured in 1761 by HMS Bellona. This class of ship is sometimes referred to as the Leviathan class. A further two ships of the class were built to a slightly lengthened version of the Courageux draught. A final two ships were ordered to a third modification of the draught.

== Ships ==
=== Standard group ===
- HMS Carnatic

Builder: Dudman, Deptford
Ordered: 14 July 1779
Launched: 21 January 1783
Fate: Broken up, 1825

- HMS Colossus

Builder: Clevely, Gravesend
Ordered: 13 December 1781
Launched: 4 April 1787
Fate: Wrecked, 1798

- HMS Leviathan

Builder: Chatham Dockyard
Ordered: 9 December 1779
Launched: 9 October 1790
Fate: Sold out of the service, 1848

- HMS Minotaur

Builder: Woolwich Dockyard
Ordered: 3 December 1782
Launched: 6 November 1793
Fate: Wrecked, 1810

=== Lengthened group ===
- HMS Aboukir

Builder: Brindley, Frindsbury
Ordered: 24 November 1802
Launched: 18 November 1807
Fate: Sold, 1838

- HMS Bombay

Builder: Deptford Dockyard
Ordered: 23 July 1805
Launched: 28 March 1808
Fate: Broken up, 1825

=== Modified group ===
- HMS Blake

Builder: Deptford Dockyard
Ordered: 30 October 1805
Launched: 23 August 1808
Fate: Sold, 1816

- HMS San Domingo

Builder: Woolwich Dockyard
Ordered: 30 October 1805
Launched: 3 March 1809
Fate: Sold, 1816
