= The Wreck of a Transport Ship =

Painting by J. M. W. Turner

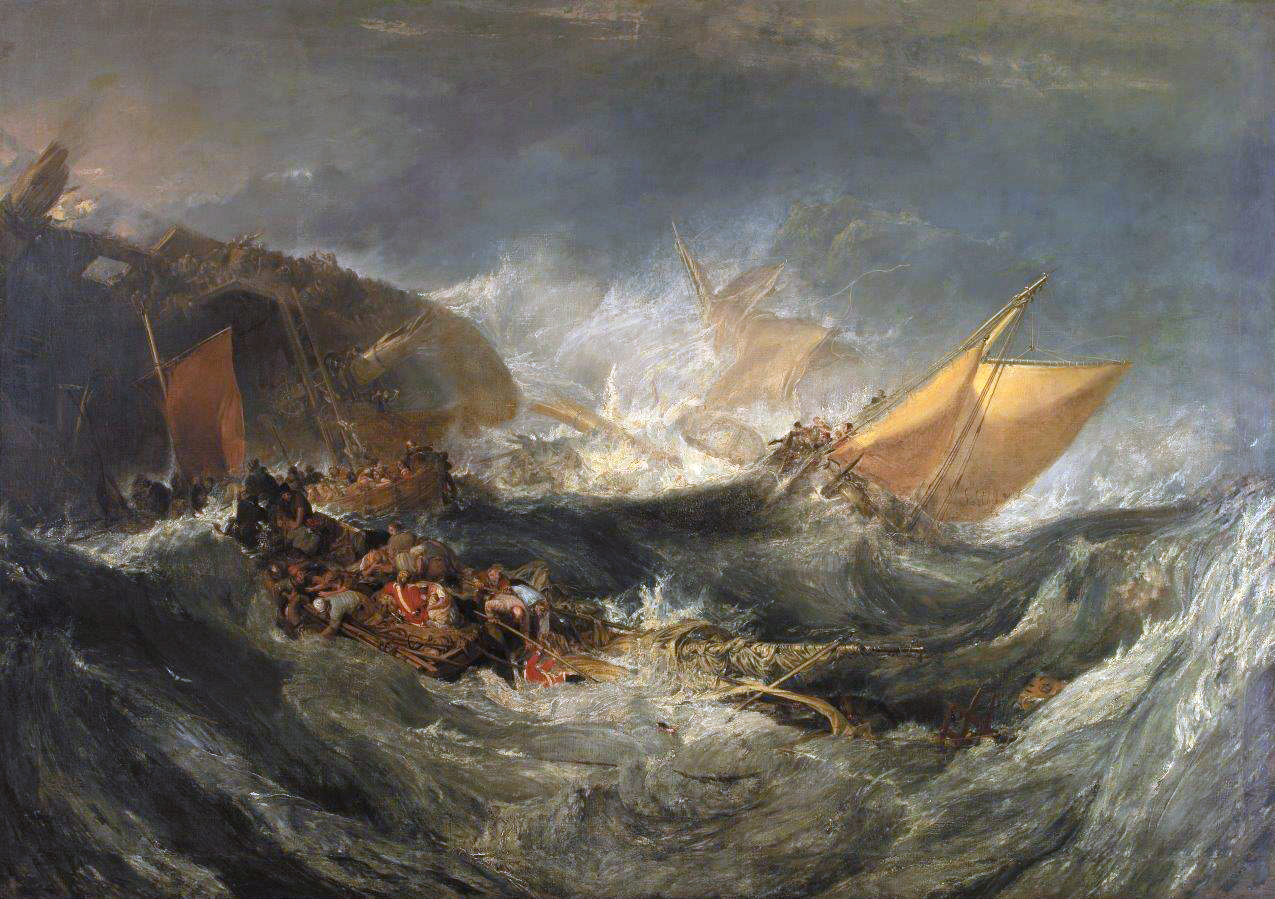
- Artist: J. M. W. Turner
- Year: 1810
- Type: Oil on canvas, seascape painting
- Dimensions: 91.5 cm × 123.2 cm (36.0 in × 48.5 in)
- Location: Calouste Gulbenkian Museum, Lisbon
- Website: gulbenkian.pt/...cargueiro/

The Wreck of a Transport Ship is an 1810 oil painting by the British artist J.M.W. Turner. A seascape, it depicts a ship overwhelmed by wind and waves at the height of a fearsome storm. The floundering vessel is doomed to become a shipwreck as lifeboats attempt pick up survivors.

Although not originally based on the loss of the HMS Minotaur of the Royal Navy in November 1810, the real life event boosted the work's topicality. Turner had been producing preparatory sketches before the incident. The Minotaur was wrecked off the coast of the Netherlands with heavy loss of life during the Napoleonic Wars. Storms and shipping disasters were a recurring theme of the Romantic Era and Turner frequently portrayed them in works such as Calais Pier, The Shipwreck and the later painting The Slave Ship.

Today the painting is in the collection of the Calouste Gulbenkian Museum in Lisbon, having been acquired in 1920. The gallery also holds another Turner painting, the landscape Quillebeuf, Mouth of the Seine.

== See also ==
- List of paintings by J. M. W. Turner

== Bibliography ==
- Casaliggi, Carmen. John Ruskin, J.M.W. Turner and the Art of Water. Cambridge Scholars Publishing, 2022.
- Jamieson, Alan G. Out of the Depths: A History of Shipwrecks. Reaktion Books, 2024.
- Shanes, Eric. The Life and Masterworks of J.M.W. Turner. Parkstone International, 2012.
