= Quillebeuf-sur-Seine =

- Commune
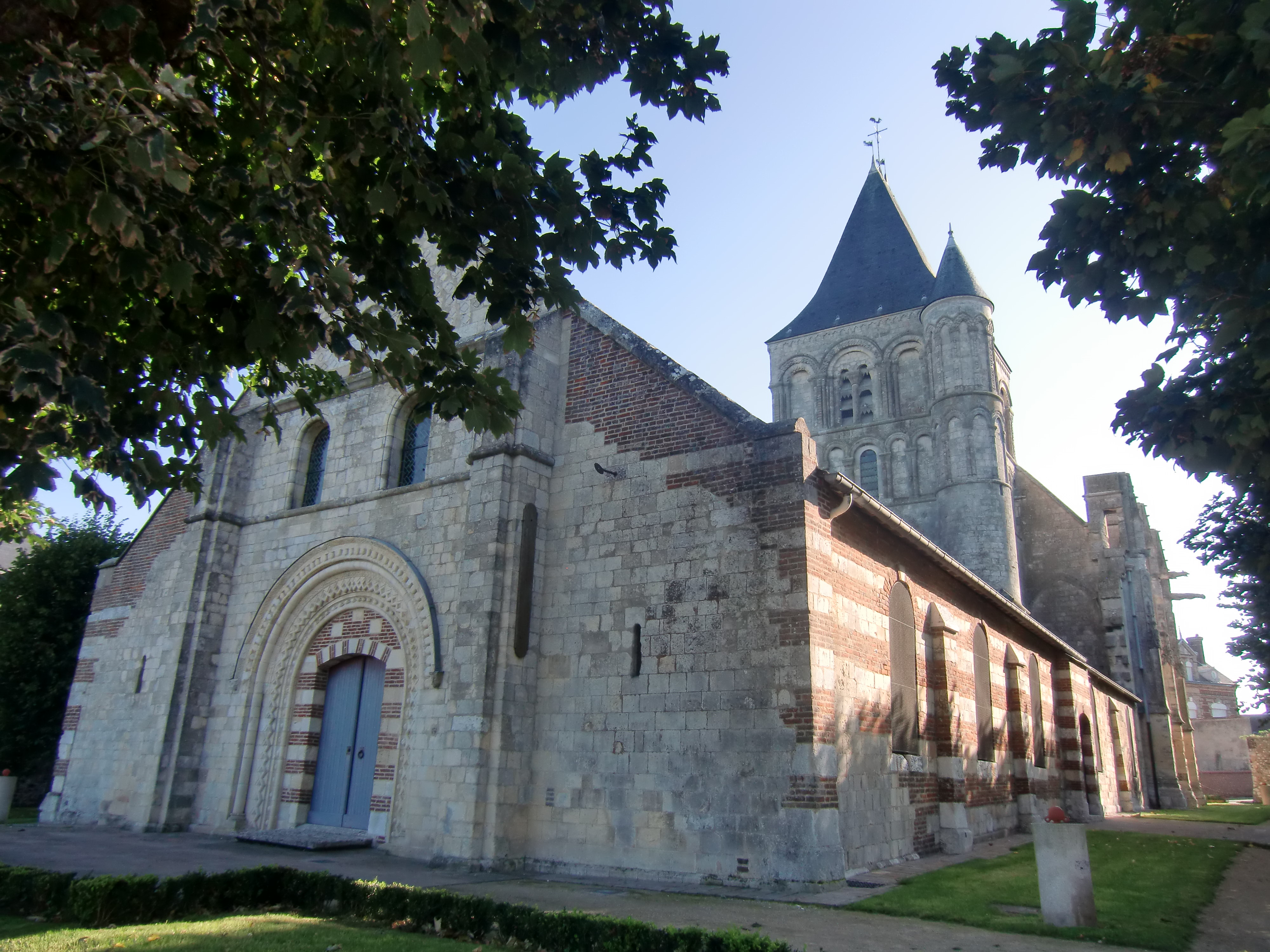
- The church in Quillebeuf

- Coat of arms
- Location of Quillebeuf-sur-Seine
- Location within France Location within Normandy
- Coordinates: 49°28′22″N 0°31′37″E
- Country: France
- Region: Normandy
- Department: Eure
- Arrondissement: Bernay
- Canton: Bourg-Achard
- Intercommunality: Pont-Audemer / Val de Risle

Government
  - Mayor (2020–2026): Carine Boquet
- Area^{1}: 10.11 km^{2} (3.90 sq mi)
- Elevation: 10 m (33 ft)
- Highest elevation: 23 m (75 ft)
- Lowest elevation: 0 m (0 ft)
- Population (2023): 859
  - Density: 85.0/km^{2} (220/sq mi)
- Time zone: UTC+01:00 (CET)
  - Summer (DST): UTC+02:00 (CEST)
- INSEE/Postal code: 27485 /27680
- ^{1} French Land Register data, which excludes lakes, ponds, glaciers > 1 km^{2} (0.386 sq mi or 247 acres) and river estuaries.

Quillebeuf-sur-Seine (French pronunciation: [kijbœf syʁ sɛn], literally Quillebeuf on Seine) is a commune in the north-western part of the Eure department in Normandy in northern France.

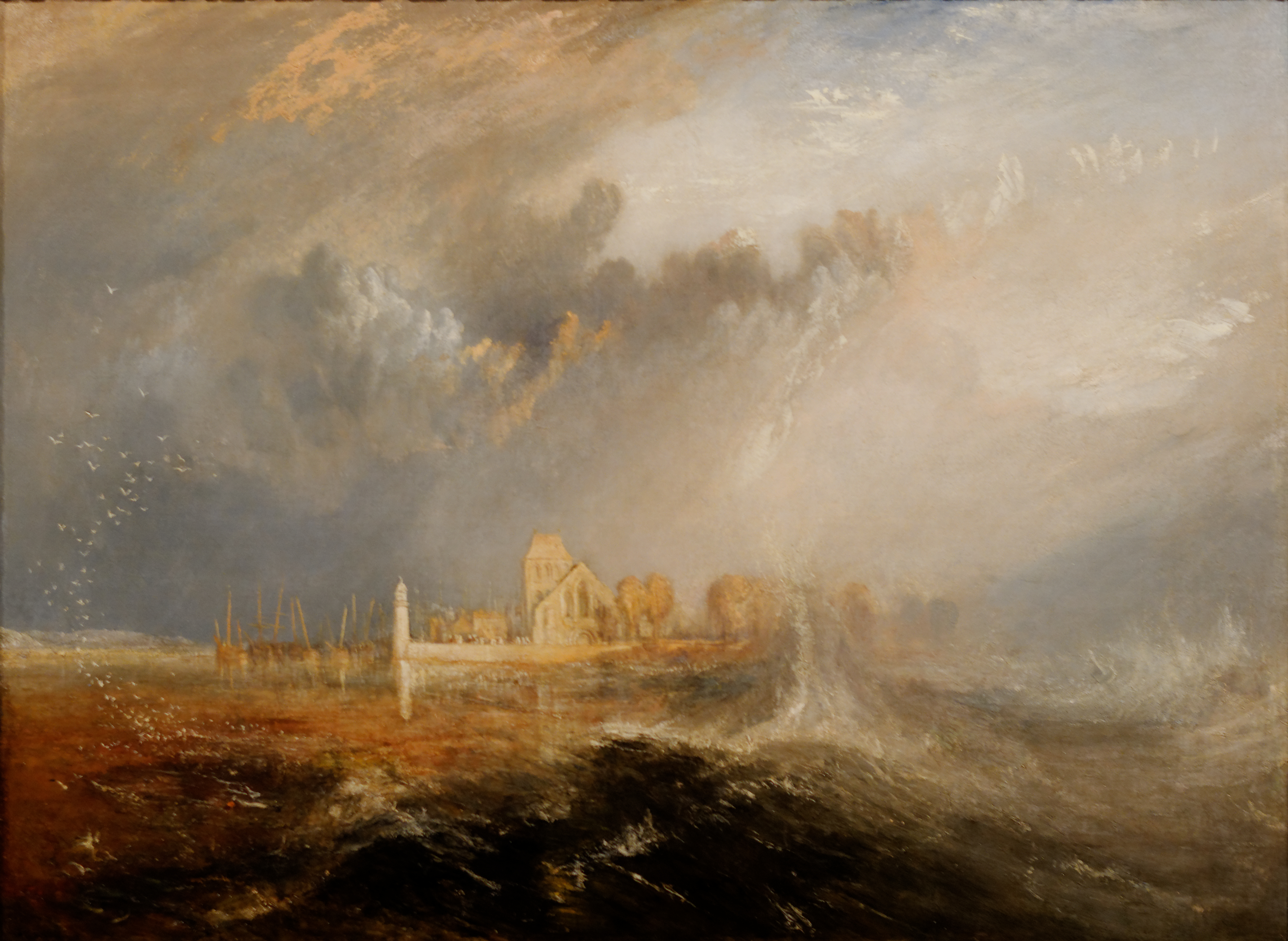
Quillebeuf, Mouth of the Seine by J.M.W. Turner, 1833

Quillebeuf, which is an old port, is located on left bank of the Seine. The town is connected to Port-Jérôme-sur-Seine, in Seine-Maritime via a car ferry.

In the nineteenth century the English artist J.M.W. Turner visited the village four times and produced an oil painting Quillebeuf, Mouth of the Seine as well as several watercolours.

== Population ==
Historical population
Year	Pop.	±% p.a.
1968	1,245	—
1975	1,201	−0.51%
1982	1,100	−1.25%
1990	1,044	−0.65%
1999	1,011	−0.36%
2007	1,020	+0.11%
2012	973	−0.94%
2017	870	−2.21%
2023	859	−0.21%
Source: INSEE

== See also ==
- Communes of the Eure department
