= Quillebeuf, Mouth of the Seine =

Painting by J. M. W. Turner

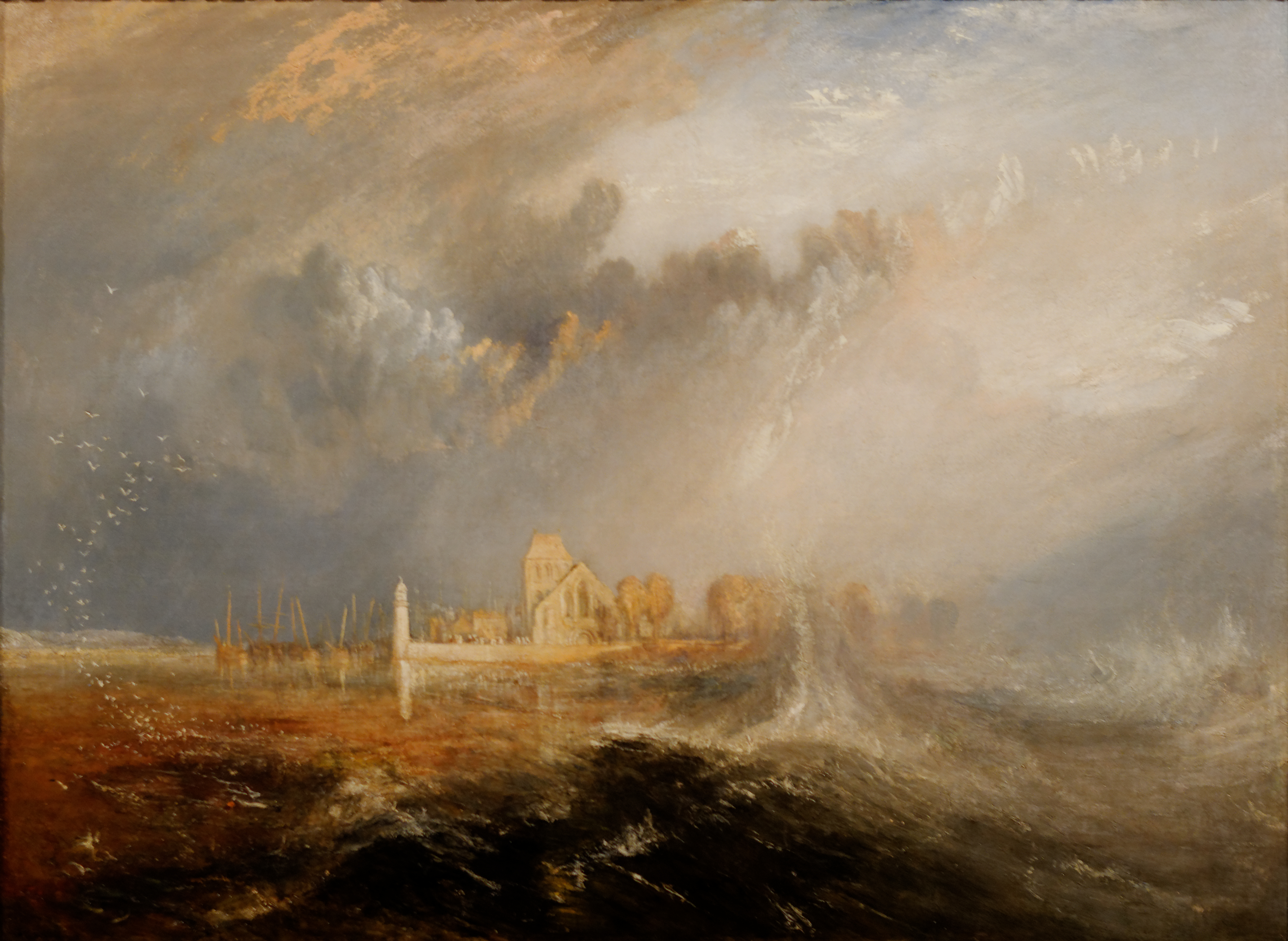
- Artist: J. M. W. Turner
- Year: 1833
- Type: Oil on canvas, landscape painting
- Dimensions: 91.5 cm × 123.2 cm (36.0 in × 48.5 in)
- Location: Calouste Gulbenkian Museum, Lisbon
- Website: gulbenkian.pt/...seine

Quillebeuf, Mouth of the Seine is an 1833 landscape painting by the British artist J.M.W. Turner. It features a view of the village of Quillebeuf-sur-Seine in Normandy. It features the church and lighthouse that were at the time at the mouth of the River Seine on the English Channel. Since the estuary has become silted up and are now some distance from the sea.

Turner was fascinated by the location and visited four different times on his trips to France and also produced several watercolours based on it. he painting was displayed at the Royal Academy Exhibition of 1833 at Somerset House in London. Today it is in the collection of the Calouste Gulbenkian Museum in Lisbon, having been acquired in 1946.

== See also ==
- List of paintings by J. M. W. Turner

== Bibliography ==
- Bailey, Anthony. J.M.W. Turner: Standing in the Sun. Tate Enterprises, 2013.
- Shanes, Eric. The Life and Masterworks of J.M.W. Turner. Parkstone International, 2012.
- Warrell, Ian. turner on the Seine. Tate Gallery, 1999.
