= HMS Bombay (1808) =

Ship of the line of the Royal Navy

History

United Kingdom
- Name: HMS Bombay
- Ordered: 23 July 1805
- Builder: Deptford Dockyard
- Laid down: October 1805
- Launched: 28 March 1808
- Renamed: HMS Blake, 1819
- Fate: Broken up, 1855

General characteristics
- Class & type: Lengthened Courageux-class ship of the line
- Tons burthen: 1701 (bm)
- Length: 172 ft 3 1/2 in (52.515 m) (gundeck)
- Beam: 47 ft 9 in (14.55 m)
- Depth of hold: 20 ft 9 in (6.32 m)
- Propulsion: Sails
- Sail plan: Full-rigged ship
- Armament: Gundeck: 28 × 32-pounders; Upper gundeck: 28 × 18-pounders; QD: 2 × 9-pounders, 12 × 32-pounder carronades; Fc: 2 × 9-pounders, 2 × 32-pounder carronades; Poop deck: 6 × 18-pounder carronades

HMS Bombay was a 74-gun third rate ship of the line of the Royal Navy, launched on 28 March 1808 at Deptford.

On 24 January 1813 Bombay, then under the command of Captain Norman Thompson, detained the Dumpteur des Ondts. (Note: A first-class share of the prize money was worth £494 4s 8¼d; a sixth-class share, that of an ordinary seaman, was worth £2 7s 8d.). She went on to be flagship of Rear-Admiral Sir John Beresford from July 1814, and of Sir Charles Penrose in 1816.

Bombay was renamed HMS Blake in 1819 in honour of Admiral Robert Blake, and was converted to harbour service in 1828.

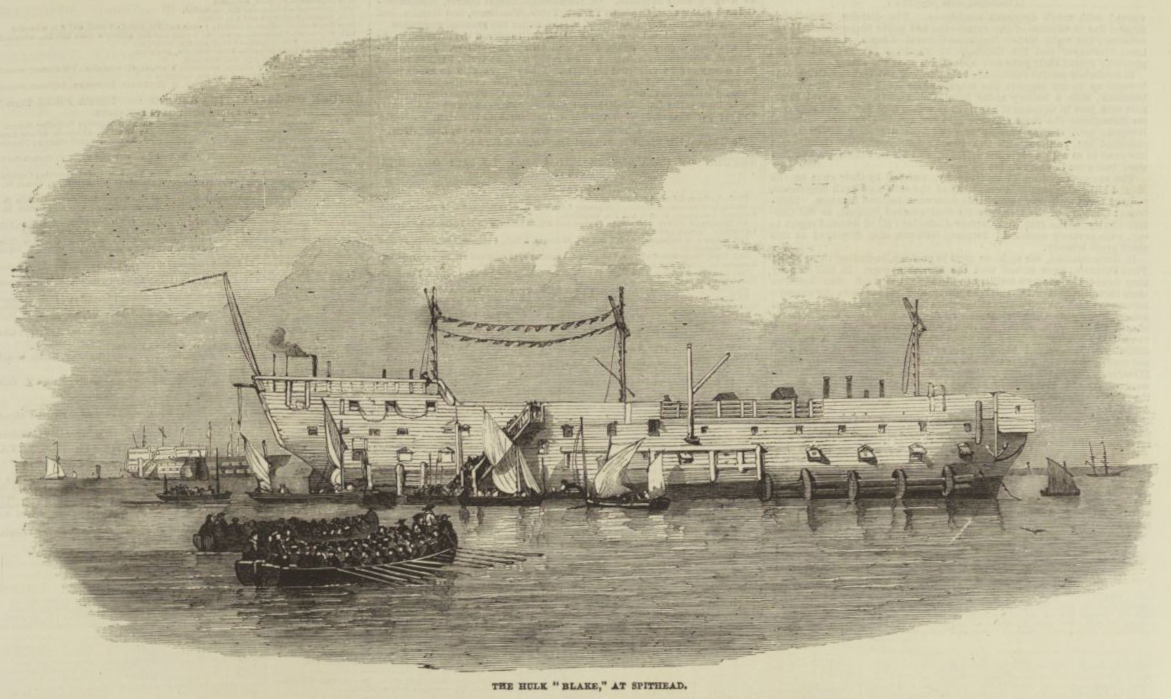
The hulk Blake at Spithead in 1854.

She was broken up in December 1855.
