= Rose in June (1810 ship) =

History

Denmark-Norway
- Builder: Denmark
- Launched: 1808
- Captured: 1810

United Kingdom
- Name: Rose in June
- Acquired: 1810 by purchase of a prize
- Captured: 5 January 1813 and burnt

General characteristics
- Tons burthen: 62, or 67 (bm)
- Notes: Fir-built

Rose in June was a galliot built in Denmark in 1808 and taken in prize in 1810 by the British. The French navy captured and burnt her in 1813 off the coast of West Africa.

Year	Master	Owner	Trade	Source
1810	Jonghurst (or Longhurst)	Wilson & Co.	London–Senegal	LR

On 17 June 1810 Rose in June, Longhurst, master, sailed from Portsmouth for Senegal in company with two other vessels.

Rose in June appeared on a list of vessels that imported goods into the colony of Sierra Leone between May 1812 and June 1814.

Year	Master	Owner	Trade	Source
1813	Jonghurst	Wilson & Co.	London–Senegal	LR

The French frigates Elbe and Hortense captured and burnt Rose in June on 5 January 1813. She was on a voyage from Sierra Leone to Gorée.
