= Aurora (1808 ship) =

History

United Kingdom
- Name: Aurora
- Owner: 1808:Broderick; 1814:Fishburn; 1830:Broderick & Co.
- Builder: Fishburn & Brodrick, Whitby
- Launched: 1808
- Fate: Last listed in 1847

General characteristics
- Tons burthen: 468, or 471 (bm)
- Length: 115 ft 6 in (35.2 m)
- Beam: 30 ft 8 in (9.3 m)
- Armament: 10 × 18-pounder carronades

Aurora was launched at Whitby in 1808. She did not enter Lloyd's Register until 1814, when she became a transport operating out of Plymouth. In 1820 she carried settlers to South Africa. Thereafter she traded to the Baltic and North America. In 1830 she transferred her registry to Hull. She was last listed in 1847.

== Career ==
Aurora first appeared in Lloyd's Register (LR) in 1814 with T. Pearson, master, Fishburn, owner, and trade Plymouth transport.

Year	Master	Owner	Trade	Source
1815	T.Pearson	Fishburn	Plymouth transport	LR
1820	T.Pearson	Fishburn	Plymouth transport	LR

In 1820 she carried settlers to South Africa under the British government's 1820 Settlers scheme. Captain Thomas Pearson sailed from England on 15 February 1820 with 344 settlers. Aurora reached Simon's Bay on 1 May, and arrived at Algoa Bay, Algoa Bay, Port Elizabeth, on 15 May.

Year	Master	Owner	Trade	Source
1825	T.Pearson	Fishburn	London–"Mrmac"	LR
1830	T.Dearness	Broderick	Hull–Quebec	LR
1835	Chambers	Broderick	Hull–Saint Petersburg	LR
1840	T.Hunter	Broderick	Hull–Quebec	LR; small repairs in 1837
1845	T.Hunter	Broderick	Hull–America	LR; small repairs in 1837 & 1841

== Fate ==
Aurora was last listed in 1847 with no trade, and with stale master and ownership data.
