= HMS Blake (1808) =

Ship of the line of the Royal Navy

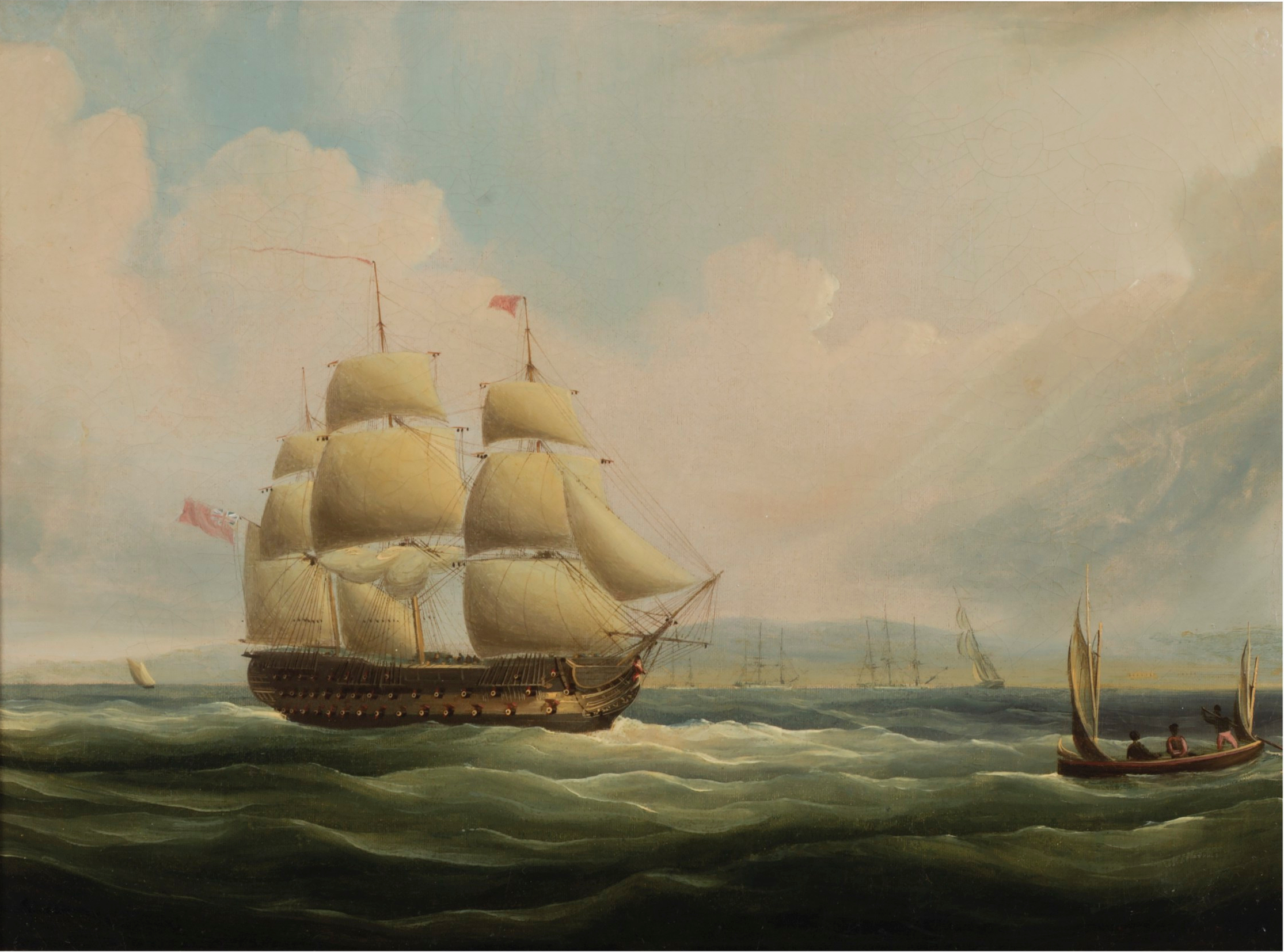
- Blake leaving Port Royal, Jamaica. (Thomas Buttersworth)

History

United Kingdom
- Name: HMS Blake
- Ordered: 30 October 1805
- Builder: Deptford Dockyard
- Laid down: April 1806
- Launched: 23 August 1808
- Fate: Sold, 1816

General characteristics
- Class & type: Modified Courageux-class ship of the line
- Tons burthen: 1822 (bm)
- Length: 180 ft (54.9 m) (gundeck)
- Beam: 48 ft 0 3/4 in (14.6 m)
- Depth of hold: 20 ft 10 in (6.4 m)
- Sail plan: Full-rigged ship
- Armament: Gundeck: 28 × 32-pounder guns; Upper gundeck: 28 × 18-pounder guns; QD: 4 × 12-pounder guns, 10 × 32-pounder carronades; Fc: 2 × 12-pounder guns, 2 × 32-pounder carronades; Poop deck: 6 × 18-pounder carronades

HMS Blake was a 74-gun third-rate ship of the line of the Royal Navy, launched on 23 August 1808 at Deptford and named in honour of Admiral Robert Blake.

On 26 September 1812, Blake and Franchise provided naval support to a land attack, at night, on Tarragona by troops under the command of General Joaquín Ibáñez Cuevas, Baron d'Eroles. The attack was successful, and resulted, inter alia, in the capture of several small vessels. The Spanish troops suffered three men killed and eight wounded; the British had no casualties whatsoever. Captain Edward Codrington, of Blake, wrote to Baron d'Eroles and to Admiral Sir Edward Pellew, Commander-in-Chief in the Mediterranean, that the officers and crew declined any prize money from the action, in favour of the Spanish troops, "in admiration of the valour and the discipline which they shewed upon the occasion."

== Fate ==
From 1814 Blake served as a prison ship. In 1816 she was sold out of the navy.
