= HMS Wild Boar (1808) =

British naval brig-sloop (1808–1810

History

United Kingdom
- Name: HMS Wild Boar
- Ordered: 31 December 1807
- Builder: John Pelham, Finsbury
- Laid down: March 1808
- Launched: 12 December 1808
- Commissioned: April 1808
- Fate: Wrecked 15 February 1810

General characteristics
- Class & type: Cherokee-class brig-sloop
- Tons burthen: 238 bm
- Length: 90 feet 0 inches (27.4 m) (gundeck); 73 feet 6 1/2 inches (22.4 m) (keel)
- Beam: 24 ft 8 in (7.5 m)
- Depth of hold: 11 ft 0 in (3.4 m)
- Propulsion: Sails
- Complement: 75
- Armament: 8 × 18-pounder carronades + 2 × 6-pounder bow chasers

HMS Wild Boar was a brig-sloop launched in 1808. She was wrecked in 1810.

== Career ==
Captain Thomas Burton commissioned Wild Boar in October 1808.

On 12 April 1809, Wild Boar captured Verite.

On 13 May Burton sailed Wild Boar for Portugal.

Lloyd's List reported on 23 May that Wildboar had detained and sent into Falmouth Gustaff, Trent, master, which had been sailing from Bordeaux.

While Wild Boar was on the Lisbon station she captured a French schooner carrying some staff officers from Ferrol to Bayonne. She returned from the Tagus to land at Falmouth an army officer with dispatches.

== Fate ==
Commander Villiers Francis Hatton was appointed to Wild Boar at the beginning of 1810 but before he could take command she was wrecked on 15 February on the Runnel Stone, Isles of Scilly. Lloyd's List reported on 20 February that Wildboar had left Falmouth on the 15th with dispatches for Lisbon.

The courtmartial of Burton and his crew took place on 23 March. It found that Wild Boar had been sailing from Falmouth to Cork and was passing between Scilly and the mainland when she struck in fine weather on the Runnelstone. She took on water so quickly most of the crew had to jump into the sea.

Earl of Uxbridge fortuitously and fortunately was in sight and came to Wild Boar's rescue. (Note: Earl of Uxbridge, of 120 tons (bm), B. Jenkins, master, had been launched in Wales in 1783.) Even so, 12 men drowned.

The court martial exonerated Burton and blamed the loss on the incompetence of the master. It also described the master's behaviour as reprehensible; when she struck he had jumped into the jolly boat and made off. The court martial ordered him dis-rated, to serve only as a seaman.

Captain Burton went on to commission the new sloop HMS Primrose.
