= Westmoreland (1808 ship) =

History

United Kingdom
- Builder: Whithaven
- Launched: 1808
- Fate: Wrecked 5 December 1822

General characteristics
- Tons burthen: 310 (bm)
- Armament: 10 × 6-pounder guns

Westmoreland was a ship launched at Whithaven in 1808 as a West Indiaman. She was lost on 5 December 1822.

== Career ==
Westmoreland first appeared in Lloyd's Register (LR) in 1809.

Year	Master	Owner	Trade	Source & notes
1809	L.Bouch	Hartley & Co.	Whithaven–Jamaica	LR
1813	L.Bouch; H.Morris; Hamlin	Hartley & Co.	Cork; Greenock–Demerara	LR
1814	Hamlin	Hamilton & Co.	Greenock–Demerara	LR
1821	Y.Hamlin; Marjoribnks	Hamilton & Co. Ogilvie	Greenock–Demerara; London–Jamaica	LR; small repairs 1820
1824	Majoribanks	Olgivie & Co.	London–Jamaica	LR; small repairs 1820

== Fate ==
Westmoreland, Majoribanks, master, was wrecked on 5 December 1822 in the Caicos Islands. Her crew and a small part of her materials were rescued. She was on a voyage from Quebec City to Jamaica. LR for 1824 carried the annotation "lost" by her name.
