= Trelawney (1808 ship) =

UK merchant ship (1808–1822)

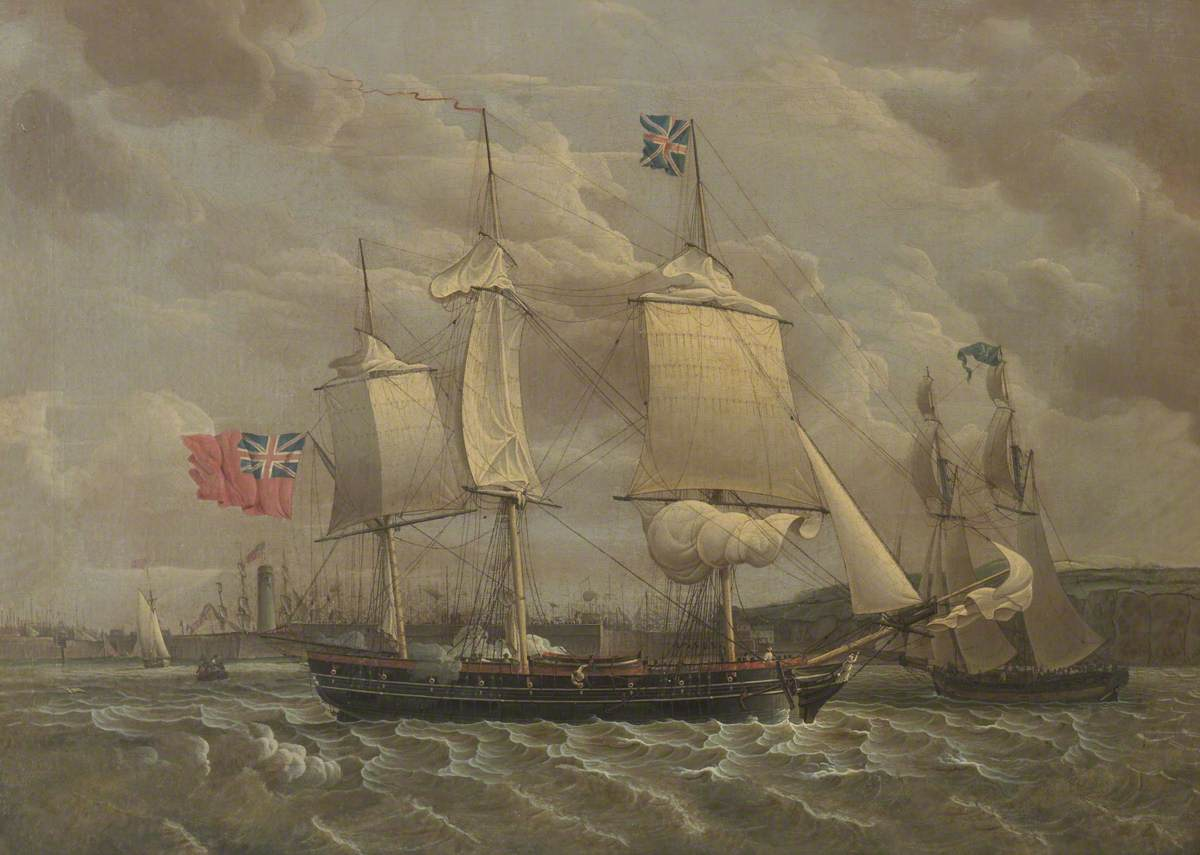
- Trelawney at Whitehaven. Beacon Museum, Whitehaven; Robert W. Salomon (1775–1851)

History

United Kingdom
- Name: Trelawney
- Builder: William Bowes, Whitehaven
- Launched: 26 February 1808
- Fate: Wrecked 11 March 1822

General characteristics
- Tons burthen: 275, or 276 (bm)
- Armament: 8 × 9-pounder guns; 10 × 9&18-pounder cannon

Trelawney was launched in 1808 at Whitehaven as a West Indiaman. She was wrecked on 11 March 1822.

== Career ==
Trelawney first appeared in Lloyd's Register (LR) in 1808.

Year	Master	Owner	Trade	Source
1808	J. Whiteside	R. Whiteside and Co.	Whitehaven	LR

Although Lloyd's Register did not specify where Trelawney was sailing, Lloyd's List's ship arrival and departure data showed that she was trading with the West Indies, particularly Jamaica. In 1808 she arrived back at Liverpool from Jamaica with a cargo sugar, rum, cotton, coffee, sweatmeats, staves, and lime juice.

Year	Master	Owner	Trade	Source
1812	J. Whiteside; Coulthirst	R. Whiteside and Co.	Cork	LR
1813	Coulthirst	R. Whiteside and Co.	Dublin–Jamaica	LR
1816	Coulthirst; Coulthard	R. Whiteside and Co.	Cork–Jamaica; Liverpool–West Indies	LR
1818	W.Bell; M'Crever	Whitesides	Whitehaven–Jamaica	LR
1819	M'Crever; M'Iver	Whitesides	London–Jamaica	LR

== Loss ==
Trelawney, M'Iver, master, of Whitehaven, was totally lost on 11 March 1822 during a severe gale at Montego Bay, Jamaica.
