= Thomas Grenville (1808 EIC ship) =

India-built UK merchant ship 1808–1843

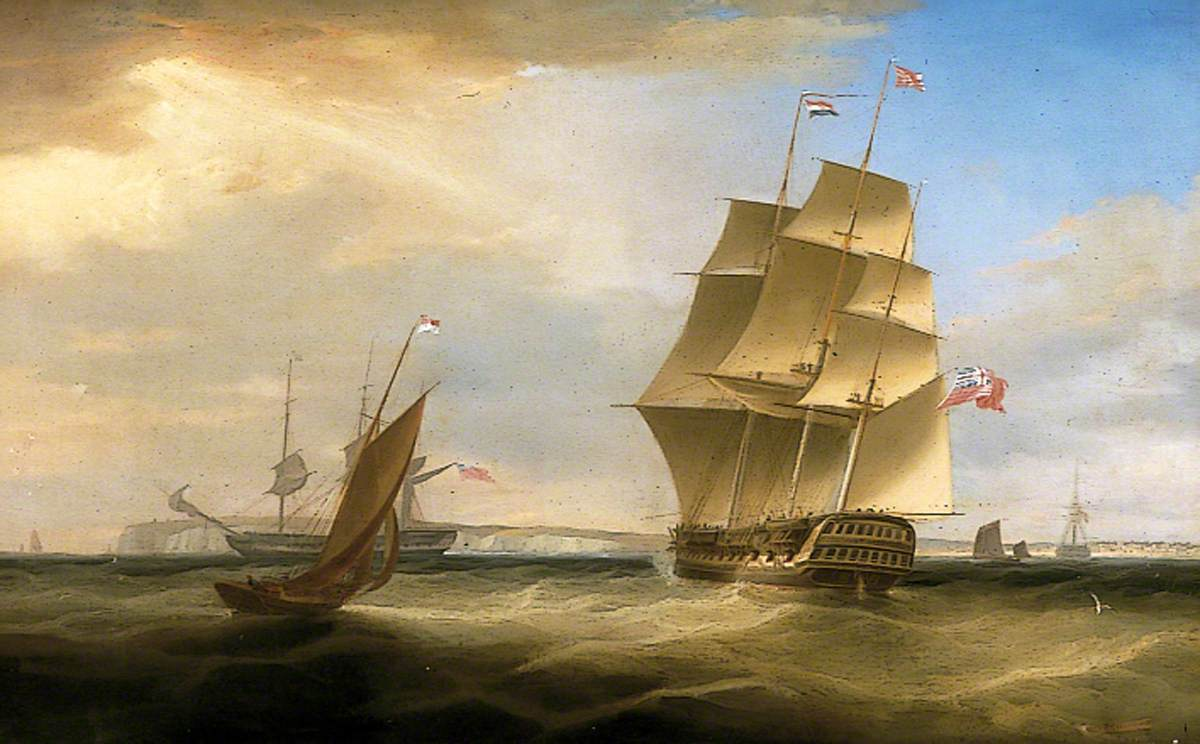
- Thomas Grenville in 1824

History

United Kingdom
- Name: Thomas Grenville
- Namesake: Thomas Grenville
- Owner: British East India Company
- Builder: Bombay Dockyard
- Cost: Rupees 359,488
- Launched: 14 March 1808
- Fate: Burnt 2 June 1843

General characteristics
- Tons burthen: 856, or 886, or 889, or 894, or 923, or 92354/94 (bm)
- Length: Overall:145 ft 10 in (44.5 m); Keel:117 ft 5 in (35.8 m)
- Beam: 37 ft 8 in (11.5 m)
- Depth of hold: 15 ft 2 in (4.6 m)
- Complement: 110
- Armament: 32 × 18-pounder guns

Thomas Grenville was an East Indiaman launched at the Bombay Dockyard for the British East India Company (EIC), and one of only a handful of East Indiamen that it actually owned. She made 14 voyages for the EIC. It sold her in 1834 when it gave up its maritime activities. She was sold for a free trader and burnt in Bombay in June 1843 in a suspicious fire.

== Career ==
Thomas Grenville sailed to China from Bombay with a cargo of cotton.

1st EIC voyage (1809–1810): Captain William Patterson sailed from Canton, bound for England. Thomas Grenville crossed the Second Bar on 24 February 1809. She reached Penang on 30 March and St Helena on 10 July. She arrive in the Downs on 8 September.

2nd EIC voyage (1810–1811): Captain Patterson acquired a letter of marque on 17 April 1810. He sailed from Portsmouth on 11 May 1810, bound for Ceylon and Bengal. Thomas Grenville was at Madeira on 27 May, reached Colombo on 2 October, and arrived at Diamond Harbour on 9 December. Homeward bound, she sailed from Saugor on 11 February 1811, stopped at Colombo again on 7 March, reached St Helena on 30 May, and arrived in the Downs on 8 August.

3rd EIC voyage (1812–1813): Captain Patterson sailed from Portsmouth on 15 May 1812, bound for Ceylon and Bengal. Thomas Grenville was at Madeira on 2 June, reached Colombo on 2 October, and arrived at Saugor on 19 December. Homeward bound, she sailed from Saugor on 7 April 1813, reached St Helena on 10 August, and arrived in the Downs on 7 November.

4th EIC voyage (1814–1815): Captain Patterson sailed from Portsmouth on 9 April 1814, bound for China. Thomas Grenville arrived at Whampoa Anchorage on 7 September. Homeward bound, she crossed the Second Bar on 8 January 1815, reached St Helena on 19 April, and arrived in the Downs on 23 June.

5th EIC voyage (1815–1816): Captain Patterson sailed from Portsmouth on 10 October 1815, bound for China. Thomas Grenville arrived at Whampoa on 5 June 1816. Homeward bound, she crossed the Second Bar on 7 July 1815, reached St Helena on 23 October, and arrived in the Downs on 15 October.

6th EIC voyage (1817–1818): Captain Richard Alsager sailed from the Downs on 23 April 1817, bound for Bengal. Thomas Grenville reached the Cape on 5 July, and arrived at Diamond Harbour on 1 September and the New Anchorage (New Anchorage, Calcutta, near Diamond Harbour and Kedgeree), on 7 November. Homeward bound, she left the New Anchorage on 17 January 1818, reached the Cape on 11 March and St Helena on 27 March, before arriving in the Downs on 21 June.

7th EIC voyage (1819–1820): Captain William Manning sailed from the Downs on 22 April 1819, bound for Madras and Bengal. Thomas Grenville reached Madras on 6 August and arrived at the New Anchorage on 1 September. Homeward bound, she sailed from Saugor on 25 February 1820, reached St Helena on 29 April, and arrived in the Downs on 21 June.

8th EIC voyage (1821–1822): Captain Manning sailed from the Downs on 21 May 1821, bound for Madras and Bengal. Thomas Grenville reached Madras on 5 September and arrived at the New Anchorage on 30 September. Homeward bound, she sailed from the New Anchorage on 24 January 1822, reached St Helena on 31 March, and arrived in the Downs on 23 May.

9th EIC voyage (1823–1824): Captain Manning sailed from the Downs on 18 June 1823, bound for Bengal. Thomas Grenville arrived at Diamond Harbour on 6 October. Homeward bound, she left Bengal on 22 December. She reached St Helena on 1 March 1824 and arrived in the Downs on 23 April.

10th EIC voyage (1825–1826): Captain Manning sailed from the Downs on 11 June 1825, bound for Bengal. Thomas Grenville arrived at Fultah on 2 October. Homeward bound, she sailed from Bengal on 27 February 1826, reached St Helena on 15 May, and arrived at the Downs on 4 July.

11th EIC voyage (1827–1828): Captain Charles Shea sailed from the Downs on 23 June 1827, bound for Bengal. Thomas Grenville arrived at Diamond Harbour on 7 November. Homeward bound, she sailed from Saugor on 14 March 1828, reached St Helena on 15 June, and arrived at the Downs on 7 August.

12th EIC voyage (1829–1830): Captain Shea sailed from the Downs on 13 March 1829, bound for Madras and Bengal. Thomas Grenville reached Madras on 27 August and arrived at Diamond Harbour on 26 September. Homeward bound, she sailed from Saugor on 2 February 1829, was at Madras on 15 February, reached St Helena on 19 April, and arrived at the Downs on 13 June.

13th EIC voyage (1831–1832): Captain Shea sailed from Plymouth on 22 June 1831, bound for Bengal and Madras. Thomas Grenville arrived at Diamond Harbour on 14 October and Calcutta on 5 November. She left Bengal on 12 January 1832, stopped at Madras on 19 January, reached St Helena on 7 April, and arrived at the Downs on 30 May.

14th EIC voyage (1833–1834): Captain James B. Burnett sailed from the Downs on 5 May 1833, bound for China. She arrived at Whampoa 27 September. Homeward bound, she crossed the Second Bar on 13 June 1834, reached St Helena on 16 March, and arrived back at the Downs on 6 May.

The Government of India Act 1833 (3 & 4 Will. 4 c. 85), removed the company's remaining trade monopolies and divested it of all its commercial functions. On 2 July 1834 the EIC sold Thomas Grenville to Ward and Somes for £6650.

Thomas Grenville continued to trade with India and China. She was listed in Lloyd's Register until 1838 with minimal data, and left the register thereafter.

== Fate ==
Thomas Grenville, Thornville, master, was in Bombay harbour when she burnt on 2 June 1843 in a suspicious fire. She was preparing to sail to China with a cargo of cotton and opium. A steamer towed the burnt-out hull up the harbour where it was later sold. The ship and her cargo were reportedly worth £10,000.
