= Manship (1785 EIC ship) =

British East Indiaman 1785–1803

History

Great Britain
- Name: Manship
- Owner: 1785:Jeffery Jackson; 1801:James Annen
- Builder: Wells, Deptford
- Launched: October 1785
- Captured: Sold to the British government as a hulk in 1803.

General characteristics
- Tons burthen: 811, 812, or 8122/94, or 818, or 854 (bm)
- Length: Overall: 145 ft 3 1/2 in (44.3 m); Keel: 117 ft 9 1/2 in (35.9 m)
- Beam: 36 ft 0 in (11.0 m)
- Depth of hold: 14 ft 9 in (4.5 m)
- Complement: 1793:100; 1796:80; 1801:75
- Armament: 1793:20 × 9-pounder guns; 1796:26 × 9&4-pounder guns; 1801:18 × 9-pounder guns
- Notes: Three decks

Manship was launched in 1785 as an East Indiaman. She made six voyages as a "regular ship" for the British East India Company (EIC). In June 1795 Manship shared with several other Indiamen and the Royal Navy in the capture of eight Dutch East Indiamen off St Helena. Her owners sold her in 1801 and she then made one voyage for the EIC as an "extra ship" on a voyage charter. Her owners sold her to the British government in 1803 for use as a powder hulk.

== Career ==
=== EIC voyage #1 (1785–1787) ===
Captain Charles Gregorie (or Gregory) sailed from The Downs on 30 December 1785, bound for Madras and Bengal. Manship was at Madeira on 29 January 1786 and reached Madras on 30 June. She arrived at Calcutta on 10 July. Homeward bound, she was at Cox's Island on 2 November, and Madras again on 16 December. She reached St Helena on 24 February 1787, and arrived at The Downs on 28 April.

=== EIC voyage #2 (1788–1789) ===
Captain Gregorie sailed from The Downs on 4 April 1788, bound for Madras and Bengal. Manship reached Madras on 14 July and arrived at Diamond Harbour on 23 July. Homeward bound, she was at Cox's Island on 20 November, and Saugor on 24 December. She was at Madras again on 1 January 1789, reached St Helena on 23 April, and arrived at The Downs on 21 June.

=== EIC voyage #3 (1791–1792) ===
Captain John Lloyd sailed from The Downs on 26 April 1791, bound for Madras and Bengal. Manship reached Madras on 14 August and arrived at Bankshall on 3 October. (Note: Bankshall was a general term for the office of harbor-master or other port authority; at Calcutta the office stood on the banks of the Hooghli River.) Homeward bound, she was at Cox's Island on 2 February 1792, and Saugor on 11 March. She was at Madras again on 24 March, reached St Helena on 26 August, and arrived at The Downs on 31 October.

=== EIC voyage #4 (1794–1795) ===
War with France had commenced on 1 February 1793 and Captain Lloyd acquired a letter of marque on 20 November 1793. The British government held Manship at Portsmouth, together with a number of other Indiamen in anticipation of using them as transports for an attack on Île de France (Mauritius). It gave up the plan and released the vessels in May 1794. It paid £2,562 10s for having delayed her departure by 123 days.

Captain Lloyd sailed from Portsmouth on 2 May 1794, bound for Madras and Bengal. Manship reached Madras on 11 September, and arrived at Diamond Harbour on 15 October. Homeward bound, she was at Cox'x Island on 13 December and Saugor on 19 February 1796. She reached Madras on 3 March and St Helena on 24 May.

While the Indiamen gathered at St Helena, the 64-gun third rate HMS Sceptre, under the command of Captain William Essington, arrived with a convoy of EIC ships sailing to India and China. She brought the news that France had invaded the Netherlands in January. Furthermore, under an order dated 9 February 1795, Royal Navy vessels and British letters of marque were instructed to detain Dutch vessels and cargoes and bring them into British ports that they might be detained provisionally. Then on 2 June the packet ship Swallow arrived from the Cape of Good Hope with the news than a convoy of Dutch East Indiamen had left the Cape, sailing for the Netherlands. Essington had prevailed upon Colonel Robert Brooke, the governor of St Helena, to lend him some troops and to put the EIC vessels there at the time under his command to form a squadron to try and intercept the Dutch.

Between 3 June and 17 June the ad hoc squadron consisting of Sceptre and the Indiamen General Goddard and several East Indiamen, succeeded in capturing eight Dutch East Indiamen off St Helena.

In the morning of 15 June, General Goddard, Busbridge, and Asia, boarded the Dutch vessels. There were no casualties on either side. The British then brought their prizes into St Helena on 17 June. On 22 August the returning EIC ships and the prizes, a convoy of some 20 vessels, sailed for Shannon, where most arrived on 13 December. (Three of the Dutch prizes were lost.) Manship arrived at the Downs on 15 October. Manship shared in the prize money for the captured Dutch vessels.

=== EIC voyage #5 (1796–1798) ===
Captain John Altham Cumberlege acquired a letter of marque on 9 February 1796 and sailed from Portsmouth on 12 April 1796, bound for Madras and Bengal. Manship was at the Cape on 21 July, . arrived at Madras on 17 November. She visited Trincomallee on 10 December before returning to Madras on 4 January 1797. She arrived at Kedgeree on 2 February. She sailed for Bombay, reaching Anjengo on 17 April and arriving at Bombay on 4 June. Homeward bound, she was at the Cape on 16 October, reached St Helena on 11 November, and arrived at The Downs on 30 January 1798.

=== EIC voyage #6 (1799–1800) ===
Captain John Altham Cumberlege sailed from Portsmouth on 2 April 1799, bound for Madras and Bengal. Manship reached Madras on 2 August and arrived at Diamond Harbour on 15 September. Homeward bound, she was at Saugor on 10 December and Madras on 15 January 1800. She reached St Helena on 23 April and Cork on 29 June, and arrived at The Downs on 5 July.

=== EIC voyage #7 (1801–1803) ===
Jeffrey Jackson sold Manship to J. Annen. She appeared in Lloyd's Register in 1802 with John Logan, master, J. Annen, owner, and trade London–India.

Captain John Logan acquired a letter of marque on 17 July 1801. Manship left Portsmouth on 9 September 1801, bound for Bengal. She was part of a convoy under escort by HMS Seahorse that also included General Stuart, Northampton, Sarah Christiana, Comet, Sovereign, Caledonia, Ann, Princess Mary, Varuna, Carron, Elizabeth, Monarch, and Friendship. The convoy reached Madeira on 23 September, and left the next day.

Manship reached Colombo on 23 January 1802, and arrived at Diamond Harbour on 1 April. Homeward bound, she was at Saugor on 4 November and the Cape on 24 February 1803. She reached St Helena on 24 March and arrived at The Downs on 26 May.

== Fate ==
Manship was sold in 1803 to the Government for use as a powder hulk. However, Lloyd's Register and the Register of Shipping listed her until 1807 with John Logan, captain, J. Annen, owner, and trade: London – India.
