= Monarch (1800 ship) =

British merchant vessel (1800–1820)

History

Great Britain
- Name: Monarch
- Owner: Peter Everitt Mestaer
- Builder: Patrick Beatson, Quebec
- Launched: 25 July 1800
- Fate: Broken up in 1820

General characteristics
- Tons burthen: 609, or 615, or 645, or 64546/94, or 646(bm)
- Length: Overall:124 ft 6 in (37.9 m), or 126 ft 0 in (38.4 m); Keel:98 ft 8 in (30.1 m)
- Beam: 34 ft 1 in (10.4 m)
- Depth of hold: 16 ft 9 1/2 in (5.1 m)
- Propulsion: Sail
- Complement: 1801:60; 1804:60
- Armament: 1801:16 × 9&18-pounder guns; 1804:18 × 18-pounder carronades

Monarch was built at Quebec in 1800. She sailed to England, being captured and recaptured shortly before arriving. In England, under new ownership, she proceeded to make five voyages for the British East India Company (EIC) as an "extra ship", that is, under voyage charter. In 1813 she became a transport, and then in 1818 or so a regular merchantman. She was broken up in 1820.

== Career ==
Monarch was the first large vessel built at Quebec. As Monarch, Davidson, master, was sailing to England from Quebec with a cargo of wood, on 16 September 1800 she encountered the French privateer Bellone, which captured her. However, four days later, HMS Immortalite recaptured Monarch, of 645 tons (bm), and sent her into Plymouth.

Monarch first appeared in Lloyd's Register (LR) for 1801 with Mortimer, master, and P.Mestaer, owner. Her trade was London–India. The EIC had Mestaers measure Monarch. It then chartered her on 25 March 1801 for one voyage to at a rate of £37/ton (bm) plus £12/ton "Surplus", for 620 tons.

=== EIC voyage #1 (1801–1802) ===
Captain Thomas Mortimer acquired a letter of marque on 1 August. He sailed from Portsmouth on 9 September, bound for Madras. Monarch was part of a convoy under escort by HMS Seahorse that also included Northampton, Manship, Sarah Christiana, Comet, Sovereign, Caledonia, Ann, Princess Mary, Varuna, Carron, Elizabeth, General Stuart, and Friendship. The convoy reached Madeira on 23 September, and left the next day.

Monarch arrived at Madras on 3 February 1802. Homeward bound, she reached at St Helena on 13 June and arrived at the Downs on 20 August.

On 14 March 1804 the EIC chartered Monarch for four voyages at a rate of £12 19s/ ton (bm) peace freight, plus £19 8s/ton for contingencies, all on a per voyage basis and based on 600 tons (bm).

=== EIC voyage #2 (1804–1805) ===
Captain Stephen Hawes acquired a letter of marque on 8 June 1804. Hawes sailed from Portsmouth on 10 July, bound for Bengal. Monarch reached Madeira on 24 July, and arrived at Calcutta on 8 December. Homeward bound, she was at Saugor on 23 January 1805 and Madras on 12 February. She reached St Helena on 20 June and arrived at the Downs on 9 September.

=== EIC voyage #3 (1806–1807) ===
Captain Hawes sailed from Portsmouth on 14 May 1806, bound for Bengal. Monarch reached the Cape of Good Hope on 6 August, and was at Penang on 14 October. She arrived at Diamond Harbour on 13 December. Homeward bound, she was at Saugor on 16 February 1807 and Pointe de Galle on 13 May. She reached St Helena on 16 June and arrived at the Downs on 6 September.

=== EIC voyage #4 (1808–1810) ===
Captain Hawes sailed from Portsmouth on 10 June 1808, bound for Bengal. Monarch reached Madeira on 25 July, and arrived at Calcutta on 28 November. On the way she and Earl Spencer rescued all of the passengers and all but 16 of the crew of Travers, which had hit a rock on 7 November at 15°38′N 94°20′E.

Homeward bound, Monarch was at Saugor on 6 March 1809. In March, Hawes joined several other EIC captains (Kymer of Lord Castlereagh and Hemming of Earl Spencer, in a letter of protest against the British Royal Navy's having impressed seamen from Indiamen. Monarch lost 19 of 57 men.

On 2 May 1809 she departed from the Sandheads with a convoy of four other Indiamen and several smaller vessels, all under the escort of HMS Victor. On 24 May a storm split the convoy and Victor and the small ships separately lost touch with the Indiamen. Monarch had a leak that had worsened. She received permission from Captain John Dale of Streatham, the senior EIC captain of the five vessels and so commodore, to sail to Penang. Hawes requested that another of the Indiamen accompany him in case Monarch foundered. Dale detailed Earl Spencer to go with Monarch. The three remaining Indiamen, Streatham, Europe, and Lord Keith continued on their way while hoping to meet up with Victor. The French frigate Caroline captured Streatham and Europe in the action of 31 May 1809. Lord Keith too exchanged broadsides with Caroline and was damaged; still, she escaped and sailed to Penang to repair.

Monarch arrived at Penang on 4 June where she underwent repairs. Lord Keith arrived a few days later and too underwent repairs. Monarch, Earl Spencer, and Lord Keith then sailed together and reached St Helena on 14 November; they arrived at the Downs on 19 January 1810.

=== EIC voyage #5 (1810–1812) ===
Captain Thomas Havard sailed from Portsmouth on 9 June 1810, bound for Bengal. Monarch reached Madeira on 25 June, and arrived at Diamond Harbour on 10 December and Calcutta on 24 December. On 25 January 1811 she was at Saugor, and on 28 February Madras. She then returned to Calcutta on 8 April. Next, she was at Diamond Harbour on 11 June, and Saugor on 5 July. She was again at Madras on 26 September. She reached Mauritius on 17 November, and St Helena on 3 January 1812.

As HMS Nyaden was carrying dispatches from Lisbon back to Great Britain, a flotilla of five French ships of the line that had escaped from Lorient spotted her. The French ships pursued Nyaden and shots were exchanged, but although some shots damaged her rigging, she managed to flee and warn a convoy of three East Indiamen, Northampton, Monarch, and Euphrates. The French, bound for Brest, continued on their route without giving chase.

Monarch arrived at the Downs on 30 March.

== Later career and fate ==
Monarch underwent a thorough repair in 1813. She then served as a London-based transport into 1818.

The Register of Shipping (RS) for 1819 showed her trade as London–"Yeatn". The volume for 1820 showed it as London–India.

On 31 August 1820 Monarch's register was cancelled, demolition having been completed.
