= Sarah Christiana (1798 ship) =

History

Great Britain
- Name: Sarah Christiana
- Owner: 1798: Robert Charnock; 1801: Henry Bonham; 1810: Todd & Co.; 1820: Spencer
- Builder: Randall, Brent & Sons, Rotherhithe
- Launched: 14 July 1798
- Fate: Broken up in 1828

General characteristics
- Tons burthen: 557, 561, or 56744/94 (bm)
- Length: Overall: 124 ft 8 in (38.0 m); Keel: 100 ft 3 in (30.6 m)
- Beam: 32 ft 4 in (9.9 m)
- Depth of hold: 12 ft 10 in (3.9 m)
- Complement: 1798:45; 1801: 52; 1805: 50; 1810: 40
- Armament: 1798: 12 × 9&6-pounder guns; 1801: 12 × 6-pounder guns; 1805: 12 × 12&6-pounder guns + 9 swivel guns; 1810: 4 × 9-pounder guns + 16 × 18-pounder carronades

Sarah Christiana was launched in 1798. She made one voyage as an "extra ship" for the British East India Company (EIC). She then made a voyage to Jamaica. On her return, the EIC engaged her for four more voyages as an East Indiaman. In 1810 she was sold and became a West Indiaman. She was broken up in 1828.

== Career ==
=== EIC voyage #1 (1798–1799) ===
Captain Richard Ayton acquired a letter of marque on 30 July 1798. He sailed from Portsmouth on 4 October 1798, bound for Madras. Sarah Christiana reached the Cape of Good Hope on 14 January 1799, and arrived at Madras on 9 May. Homeward bound, she reached St Helena on 18 July, was at Galway Bay on 8 September, and arrived at The Downs on 29 October.

=== West Indiaman (1800) ===
The EIC had originally engaged Sarah Christiana for only one voyage. Therefore, on her return, her owners had her sail to Jamaica. The Register of Shipping for 1801 showed Sarah Christiana's master as R. Ayton, her owner as Keighly, and her trade as London–Jamaica.

The EIC again engaged Sarah Christiana for a voyage.

=== EIC voyage #2 (1801–1802) ===
Captain Charles Graham acquired a letter of marque on 29 May 1801. Sarah Christiana left Portsmouth on 9 September, bound for Bengal. She was part of a convoy under escort by HMS Seahorse that also included General Stuart, Northampton, Manship, Comet, Sovereign, Caledonia, Ann, Princess Mary, Varuna, Carron, Elizabeth, Monarch, and Friendship. The convoy reached Madeira on 23 September, and left the next day.

Sarah Christiana arrived at Calcutta on 5 February 1802. Homeward bound, she was at Kedgeree on 31 March, reached St Helena on 7 July, and arrived at The Downs on 4 September.

The EIC then engaged her for another two voyages. It accepted a tender from Henry Bonham on 19 February 1805 at a rate of £15 4s per ton (for 562 ton), peace time freight plus £12 for war contingencies.

=== EIC voyage #3 (1805–1807) ===
Captain Thomas Mackeson acquired a letter of marque on 6 July 1805.

Sarah Christiana was one of the EIC vessels that were part of the expedition under General Sir David Baird and Admiral Sir Home Riggs Popham that would in 1806 capture the Dutch Cape Colony. They would carry supplies and troops to the Cape, and then continue on their voyages, in Sarah Christiana's case, Madras and Bengal.

Sarah Christiana was at Cork on 31 August and Madeira on 29 September. She was with the fleet at She and the fleet were at St Salvador Bay on 11 November and the Cape of Good Hope on 4 January 1806.

After the Dutch Governor Jansens signed a capitulation on 18 January 1806, and the British established control of the Cape Colony, HMS Belliqueux escorted the East Indiamen William Pitt, Jane, Duchess of Gordon, Sir William Pulteney, Comet to Madras. The convoy included the Northampton, Streatham, Europe, Union, Glory, and Sarah Christiana.

Sarah Christiana reached Madras on 22 April. At Madras, the captains of the eight East Indiamen in the convoy joined to present Captain George Byng, of Belliqueux, a piece of silver plate worth £100 as a token of appreciation for his conduct while they were under his orders. Byng wrote his thank you letter to them on 24 April.

Sarah Christiana arrived at Calcutta on 14 May. Homeward bound, Sarah Christiana was at Culpee on 23 August. She returned to Madras on 29 September and the Cape on 18 December. She reached St Helena on 6 January 1807, and was at Cork on 16 March and the Scilly Isles on 29 March, before she arrived at Falmouth on 2 April.

=== EIC voyage #4 (1807–1808) ===
Captain Mackeson sailed from Portsmouth on 15 September 1807, bound for Madras and Bengal.

She was reported well on 28 November at 30°10′S 5°20′W. She was in convoy with Northampton, Ann, Union, Diana, Sir William Pulteney, and Glory. Their escort was the 64-gun third rate HMS Monmouth.

Sarah Christiana reached Madras on 17 February 1808, and arrived at Calcutta on 18 March. Homeward bound, she was at Diamond Harbour on 17 May and Saugor on 15 June. She reached St Helena on 28 September and arrived at The Downs on 9 December.

On 15 March 1809, the EIC accepted a tender from James Innes for one voyage at a rate of £39 15s per ton for 564 tons.

=== EIC voyage #5 (1809–1810) ===
Captain Mackeson sailed from Portsmouth 7 July 1809, bound for Bengal and Madras. Sarah Christiana arrived at Calcutta on 12 December. Homeward bound, she was at Culpee on 14 February 1810, Madras on 17 March, and the Cape on 12 July. She reached St Helena on 30 July, and arrived at The Downs on 26 September.

=== West Indiaman ===
In 1810 Sarah Christian was sold to Todd & Co., London, who employed her as a West Indiaman. Captain James Young acquired a letter of marque on 21 December 1810.

Year	Master	Owner	Trade	Source
1811	Mackerson; T. Young	D. Scott; Todd & Co.	London–India; London–G	Register of shipping (RS)
1815	T. Young	Todd & Co.	London–Grenada	RS
1820	Fisher	Spencer	London–Grenada	RS
1825	Fisher	Spencer	London–Jamaica	RS

== Fate ==
On 15 February 1828, the London Public Ledger And Daily Advertiser carried an advertisement for the sale on 19 February in a candle auction at Lloyd's Coffee House of Sarah Christiana. The advertisement gave the name of her master as David Briggs and stated that she was fully equipped for her next voyage. A second advertisement in the same publication, dated 17 June, described her as fully repaired for a voyage, and lying at a dockyard in Limehouse. On 27 November 1828, her register was cancelled, demolition being completed.
