= General Stuart (1801 ship) =

British East India Company ship

History

United Kingdom
- Name: General Stuart
- Owner: EIC voyage #1 Thomas Wilkinson: EIC voyages #2-3 Moses Agar; EIC voyage #4:Samuel Hale; EIC voyages #5-6:John Hotson; EIC voyage #7:Thomas G Murray; 1814:Hamilton
- Builder: J.Dudman, Deptford
- Launched: 27 June 1801
- Fate: No longer listed after 1825

General characteristics
- Tons burthen: 600, 607, or 635, or 637, or 63788/94 (bm)
- Length: Overall:134 ft 7 in (41.0 m); Keel:110 ft 4 in (33.6 m)
- Beam: 32 ft 2 1/2 in (9.8 m)
- Depth of hold: 12 ft 2 in (3.7 m)
- Complement: 1801:39; 1803:55; 1805:100; 1806:65; 1808:50
- Armament: 1801:12 × 18-pounder guns; 1803:14 × 18&9-pounder guns; 1805:18 × 18&9-pounder guns; 1806:18 × 18&9-pounder guns; 1808:18 × 18&9-pounder guns
- Notes: Three decks

General Stuart (or General Stewart) was launched in 1801 as an East Indiaman. She made seven voyages as an "extra ship" for the British East India Company (EIC) between 1801 and 1814. She then sailed between England and India under a license from the EIC. In 1819 she transported convicts from England to New South Wales. She continued to trade with Australia and was last listed in 1825.

== EIC voyages ==
=== EIC voyage #1 (1801–1803) ===
Captain Robert Abbon Marsh acquired a letter of marque on 29 July 1801. He sailed from Portsmouth on 9 September 1801, bound for Madras and Bengal. General Stuart was part of a convoy under escort by HMS Seahorse, and also included Northampton, Manship, Sarah Christiana, Comet, Sovereign, Caledonia, Ann, Princess Mary, Varuna, Carron, Elizabeth, Monarch, and Friendship. The convoy reached Madeira on 23 September, and left the next day.

General Stuart reached Madras on 4 February 1802, and arrived at Calcutta on 5 March. Homeward bound, she was at Kedgeree on 1 September, and Madras again on 29 September. She reached St Helena on 4 January 1803 and arrived at The Downs on 23 March.

On 1 April 1803, the EIC accepted a tender from Moses Agar, General Stuart's owner, of a rate of £13 19s per ton for 600 tons, for six voyages.

=== EIC voyage #2 (1803–1804) ===
Captain Thomas Mortimer acquired a letter of marque on 8 June 1803. He sailed from Plymouth on 17 July 1803, bound for Madras. On 28 July General Stuart was at Madeira.

On 27 August, General Stuart captured the French brig Aurora.

General Stuart was at Fernando de Noronha on 15 September. She had arrived there because of weak winds near the equator. She tried to take on water but the well there was dry and she was able to gather only nine butts. She arrived at Madras on 3 January 1804. Homeward bound, she reached St Helena on 29 June and arrived at The Downs on 10 October.

=== EIC voyage #3 (1805–1806) ===
Captain John Rogers acquired a letter of marque on 18 March 1805. He sailed from Portsmouth on 25 April, bound for Madras and Bengal. General Stuart reached Madras on 23 August, and arrived at Diamond Harbour on 11 September. Homeward bound, she was at Saugor on 14 November. She first sailed to Bencoolen where she arrived on 26 December. She reached St Helena on 10 April 1806 and arrived at The Downs on 13 June.

=== EIC voyage #4 (1805–1806) ===
Captain Rogers acquired a new letter of marque on 12 October 1806. He sailed from Portsmouth on 4 January 1807, bound for Madras and Bengal. General Stuart was at the Cape of Good Hope on 13 April, reached Madras on 11 June, and arrived at Diamond Harbour on 18 July. Homeward bound, she was at Saugor on 30 September, reached St Helena on 14 February 1808, and arrived at Gravesend on 12 April.

=== EIC voyage #5 (1808–1810) ===
Captain James Jameson acquired a letter of marque on 5 August 1808. He sailed from Portsmouth on 17 September 1808, bound for Madras and Bengal. General Stuart was at Madeira on 28 September, reached Madras on 11 February 1809, and arrived at Calcutta on 24 March. Homeward bound, she was at Diamond Harbour on 4 July and Madras again on 12 September. At Madras George Herbart Gall, the commander of the Governor General's bodyguard, presented Jameson with a vase worth £150 on behalf of his fellow officers and the passengers who had sailed on her from Bengal.

General Stuart was at the Cape on 25 December, reached St Helena on 27 January 1810, and arrived at Long Reach on 16 April.

=== EIC voyage #6 (1811–1812) ===
Captain Jameson sailed from Torbay on 12 May 1811, bound for Madras and Bengal. General Stuart reached Madras on 12 September and arrived at Calcutta on 21 October. Homeward bound, she was at Saugor on 24 December, reached St Helena on 12 May 1812, and arrived at Blackwall on 27 July.

=== EIC voyage #7 (1813–1814) ===
Captain Jameson sailed from Portsmouth on 18 March 1813, bound for Madras and Bengal. General Stuart was at Johanna on 13 July, reached Madras on 9 August, and arrived at Calcutta on 27 August. Homeward bound she was at Saugor on 6 November and the Cape on 1 March 1814. She reached St Helena on 18 March and arrived at Blackwall on 4 June.

== Later career ==
The EIC in 1814 lost its monopoly on the trade between England and India. Many shipowners then sailed that trade under license from the EIC. General Stewart appeared in Lloyd's Register in 1814 with J. Jameson, master, Hamilton, owner, and trade London–Bengal. General Stuart, W.S. Robb, master, sailed from London for Bengal on 1 September 1814. On 21 June 1815 General Stuart sailed from Bombay, bound for London. The next day she had to put back. She had sprung a leak and only with difficulty, and after having thrown some cargo overboard, was she able to get back into the harbour. She had 10 feet of water in her hold.

On 22 January 1816, General Stuart (or General Stewart) was offered for sale at Lloyd's Coffee House for breaking up. Instead, she instead underwent a "good repair" and continued to sail.

Lloyd's Register for 1816 showed General Stewart's master changing from J. Jameson to R. Grainger.

On 2 November 1816 General Stuart sailed from The Downs, bound for Bombay. Off Ushant she lost two top sails, but suffered no further damage. Still, she put back into Portsmouth on 14 November.

=== Convict transport ===
Captain Robert Granger sailed from Portsmouth on 19 July 1818. General Stewart stopped at St Helena and arrived at Port Jackson on 31 December. She had embarked 250 convicts and she landed 246, four having died on the way. After delivering her convicts, General Stewart was expected to sail on to Bombay.

== Fate ==
Between 1820 and 1825 the registers continued to show General Stuart trading with New South Wales. She is no longer listed after 1825.
