= Ann (1801 ship) =

History

United Kingdom
- Name: Ann
- Owner: EIC voyage #1:Matthew White; EIC voyages #2-6:William Masson; EIC voyage #7:Shakespeare Read; EIC voyage #8:James Masson; 1818:W. Masson
- Builder: Randall, Rotherhithe
- Launched: 15 June 1801
- Fate: Last listed 1826

General characteristics
- Tons burthen: 508, 50824/94, 531, or 533, or 600 (bm)
- Length: 128 ft 7 in (39.2 m) (overall); 105 ft 10 1/2 in (32.3 m) (keel)
- Beam: 30 ft 2 1/22 in (9.2 m)
- Depth of hold: 15 ft 4 1/2 in (4.7 m)
- Sail plan: Full-rigged ship
- Crew: 1801:60; 1803:50
- Armament: 1801:16 × 12-pounder guns; 1803:16 × 12-pounder guns
- Notes: Three decks

Ann was launched at Rotherhithe in the River Thames in 1801. She made eight voyages for the British East India Company (EIC) as an "extra ship", i.e., under charter, between 1801 and 1817. After 1817 she traded with India for some time and she was last listed in 1826.

== Career ==
=== EIC voyage #1 (1801-1802) ===
Captain Alexander Sinclair acquired a letter of marque on 10 August 1801. Sinclair sailed from Portsmouth on 9 September, bound for Madras and Bengal. Ann was part of a convoy under escort by HMS Seahorse that also included General Stuart, Manship, Sarah Christiana, Northampton, Sovereign, Caledonia, Comet, Princess Mary, Varuna, Carron, Elizabeth, Monarch, and Friendship. The convoy reached Madeira on 23 September, and left the next day.

Ann reached Madras on 4 February 1802, and arrived at Calcutta on 5 March. Homeward bound, she was at Kedgeree on 25 May, reached St Helena on 17 September, and arrived at Long Reach on 26 November.

=== EIC voyage #2 (1803-1805) ===
Captain Thomas Price acquired a letter of marque on 11 June 1803. He sailed from Plymouth on 17 July, bound for Madras and Bombay. Ann was at Rio de Janeiro on 23 September, and arrived at Madras on 2 February 1804. She was at Bombay on 25 May, reached St Helena on 4 November, and arrived at Long Reach on 11 February 1805.

=== EIC voyage #3 (1805-1807) ===
Captain James Masson sailed from the Downs on 7 June 1805, bound for Madras and Bengal. Ann stopped at Cork on 31 August. She was at Madeira on 29 September and Fernando de Noronha on 20 November, together with Tigris; Ann arrived at Madras on 2 March 1806. She then arrived at Diamond Harbour on 5 April. Homeward bound, she was at Saugor on 20 September and Madras on 10 October. She reached the Cape of Good Hope on 31 December and St Helena on 24 January 1807, before arriving at Purfleet on 15 April.

=== EIC voyage #4 (1807-1809) ===
Captain Masson sailed from Portsmouth on 15 September 1807, bound for Madras and Bengal. Ann was at Madeira on 28 September. She was reported well on 28 November at 30°10′S 5°20′W. She was in convoy with Northampton, Sarah Christiana, Union, Diana, Sir William Pulteney, and Glory. Their escort was the 64-gun third rate HMS Monmouth.

Ann arrived at Madras on 17 February 1808. She then reached Calcutta on 18 March. Homeward bound, she was at Diamond Harbour on 23 August, and again at Madras on 9 September. She reached the Cape on 19 January 1809 and St Helena on 25 February, and arrived at Long Reach on 24 May.

=== EIC voyage #5 (1810-1811) ===
Captain Peter Cameron sailed from Portsmouth on 13 April 1810, bound for Madras and Bengal. Ann was at Madeira on 17 May and arrived at Madras on 13 October. She then reached Calcutta on 20 November. Homeward bound, she was at Saugor on 29 December and Vizagapatam on 31 January 1811, and again at Madras on 26 February. She reached St Helena on 16 June, and arrived at Long Reach on 2 September.

=== EIC voyage #6 (1812-1813) ===
Captain Cameron sailed from Portsmouth on 8 April 1812, bound for Madras and Bengal. Ann was at Madeira on 23 April and arrived at Madras on 16 September. She then reached Calcutta on 3 November. Homeward bound, she was at Saugor on 21 January 1813. She was at Mauritius on 4 May, reached St Helena on 3 August, and arrived at Blackwall on 10 November.

=== EIC voyage #7 (1814-1815) ===
Captain Cameron sailed from Portsmouth on 8 June 1814, bound for Bengal and Bencoolen. Ann was at Madeira on 23 June and arrived at Diamond Harbour on 1 December. She reached Bencoolen on 16 March 1815. Homeward bound, she reached St Helena on 14 July, and arrived at Blackwall on 20 September.

=== EIC voyage #8 (1816-1817) ===
(8) 1815/6 Bombay. Captain James Masson sailed from the Downs on 19 May 1816, bound for Bombay. Ann was at Madeira on 31 May Madeira and arrived at Bombay on 22 September. Homeward bound, she was at Cochin on 31 December, reached the Cape on 19 February 1817 and St Helena on 14 March, and arrived at Northfleet on 29 May.

=== Post-EIC ===
Some reports have Ann being sold in 1817 for breaking up. However, she appears to have continued in the India trade, sailing under a license from the EIC.

Ann, of 600 tons (bm), River-built in 1801, appeared in Lloyd's Register for 1818 with Reynolds, master, Masson & Co., owner, and trade London–India. The 1819 volume showed her master changing from Reynolds to Thacker. She appears in the 1820 volume with Thatcher, master, and Mason, owner.

In late 1819 the government appointed Captain Francis Augustus Collier of Liverpool to command the naval portion of a joint navy-army punitive expedition against the Joasmi (Al Qasimi) pirates at Ras al-Khaimah in the Persian Gulf. The naval force consisted of Liverpool, Eden, Curlew, several EIC cruisers including HCS Aurora, and a number of gun and mortar boats. There were also a large number of transports to carry troops and supplies. One of the transports was an Ann.

After the British destroyed Ras-al-Khaima, they then spent the rest of December and early January moving up and down the coast destroying forts and vessels. The capture and destruction of the fortifications and ships in the port was a massive blow for the Gulf pirates. British casualties were minimal.

== Fate ==
Ann was last listed in Lloyd's Register in 1821 with Thatcher, master, W. Masson, owner, and trade London–Bombay. She was last listed in the Register of Shipping in 1826, still with Thatcher, master, and Mason, owner.
