= North Gate Bridge Gaol =

The North Gate Bridge Gaol was the prison for Cork City from the early 1700s. From 1798 it was used to hold United Irishmen prisoners from the Irish Rebellion of 1798 until they were transferred to the convict transports Minerva (1773 ship) and Friendship (1793 ship) in 1799 until they sailed for the penal colony of New South Wales in August of that year. Since it was built on a confined city centre site it was overcrowded and unhygienic, it was replaced by a more modern prison in Cork City Gaol in the early 1800s.

== Former prisoners ==
- Giusto Fernando Tenducci, 1766
