= Northampton (1801 ship) =

History

British East India Company
- Name: Northampton
- Owner: EIC Voyages 1-2:Moses Agar; EIC Voyages 3-7: John Crosthwaite; EIC Voyages 8-9: George Palmer
- Builder: Peter Everitt Mestaer, King and Queen Dock, Rotherhithe
- Launched: 11 July 1801
- Fate: Sold for breakup in 1819 but listed through 1822

General characteristics
- Tons burthen: 523, 542, 54247/94, 548, or 573 (bm)
- Length: 123 ft 6 in (37.6 m) (overall); 99 ft 1 in (30.2 m) (keel)
- Beam: 32 ft 1 in (9.8 m)
- Depth of hold: 12 ft 6 in (3.8 m)
- Propulsion: Sail
- Complement: 1801: 50; 1803: 55; 1807: 60; 1811: 55
- Armament: 1801: 14 × 12- & 9-pounder guns; 1803: 14 × 12- & 9-pounder guns; 1807: 16 × 12- & 24-pounder guns; 1811: 16 × 12-pounder guns

Northampton, was a three-decker merchant ship launched in 1801 upon the River Thames, England. She made eight voyages to India as an extra (chartered) ship for the British East India Company (EIC) between 1801 and 1819. During the same period she made one separate trip transporting convicts from Britain to New South Wales, followed by a voyage for the EIC from China back to England. In 1820 she carried settlers to South Africa. She is last listed in Lloyd's Register in 1822.

== Launching ==
Northampton was launched gradually at the top of the tide and at the turn of the tide went into the dock to finish coppering. Many boats observed the launch, as did many visitors at a gallery that Captain Robert Barker had erected. On the evening of 29 July 1801, Barker provided a dinner for 300 guests at the London Tavern. The dinner was set out in the workshop and 180 ladies took their seats. Afterwards, the tables were removed and the evening concluded with a ball.

== Voyages ==
=== EIC Voyage 1 (1801-03) ===
Captain Robert Barker received a letter of marque on 11 August 1801. Northampton was sailing during the French Revolutionary Wars and the letter authorized Barker to engage in offensive, not just defensive, action against the French and their allies should the opportunity arise.

Northampton left Portsmouth on 9 September 1801, bound for Bengal. She was part of a convoy under escort by HMS Seahorse that also included General Stuart, Manship, Sarah Christiana, Comet, Sovereign, Caledonia, Ann, Princess Mary, Varuna, Carron, Elizabeth, Monarch, and Friendship. The convoy reached Madeira on 23 September, and left the next day.

Northampton reached Bombay on 11 February 1802. From there she sailed up to Surat, which she reached on 2 April. She returned to Bombay five days later. She arrived at Calcutta on 14 May. For her homeward bound trip she passed Sagar Island on 19 October and reached St Helena on 14 January 1803. She arrived at the Downs on 23 March.

=== EIC Voyage 2 (1803-05) ===
Barker left Plymouth for Bengal on 17 July 1803. The Napoleonic Wars had broken out after the one-year Peace of Amiens, so her required a new letter of marque, which he had received on 20 June 1803.

Northampton left Plymouth on 17 July, reached Rio de Janeiro on 23 September. On 16 October she was three days out of Rio and in convoy with Lord Melville, Earl Spencer, Princess Mary, Anna, Ann, Glory, and Essex. Their escorts were the 74-gun third rate ships of the line HMS Russell, Albion, and Sceptre, and the fourth rate HMS Grampus.

Northampton arrived at Calcutta on 12 February 1804. She was at Diamond Harbour on 29 April. She left Bengal on 5 July in company with Maria, Mornington, and Princess Mary. However, eight days later Northampton parted company, and being "very Crank, it is supposed put back to Bengal." Northampton finally reached St Helena on 22 November, and arrived at the Downs on 9 February 1805.

=== EIC Voyage 3 (1805-07) ===
Barker left Cork on 31 August 1805, bound for Madras and Bengal. Northampton reached Madeira on 28 September.

Northampton was one of the EIC vessels that were part of the expedition under General Sir David Baird and Admiral Sir Home Riggs Popham that would in 1806 capture the Dutch Cape Colony. They would carry supplies and troops to the Cape, and then continue on their voyages.

Northampton reached the Cape on 5 January 1806. On 11 February Northampton and the convoy she was with were well, three days out of the Cape on their way to Madras. The convoy was under the escort of HMS Belliqueux, a 64-gun third rate, and also included William Pitt, Streatham, Europe, Jane Duchess of Gordon, Sir William Pulteney, Union, Comet, Glory, and Sarah Christiana.

Northampton reached Madras on 22 April. At Madras, the captains of the eight East Indiamen in the convoy joined together to present Captain George Byng, of Belliqueux, a piece of silver plate worth £100 as a token of appreciation for his conduct while they were under his orders. Byng wrote his thank you letter to them on 24 April.

Northampton arrived at Calcutta on 8 June. Homeward bound, she passed Sagar on 20 April, returned to Madras on 9 October, reached Trincomalee on 18 October, the Cape on 30 December, and St Helena on 23 January 1807. She arrived at the Downs on 12 April.

=== EIC Voyage 4 (1807-08) ===
Captain Thomas Sanders replaced Barker for this and the next voyage. The change of masters meant the need for a new letter of marque, and Sanders received his on 13 August 1807.

Northampton left Portsmouth on 15 September 1807, bound for Madras and Bengal. She reached Madeira on 28 September. She was reported well on 28 November at 30°10′S 5°20′W. She was in convoy with Sarah Christiana, Ann, Union, Diana, Sir William Pulteney, and Glory. Their escort was the 64-gun third rate HMS Monmouth.

Northampton reached Madras on 15 February 1808. She arrived at Kidderpore on 19 March and was at Culpee, an anchorage towards Calcutta, and closer than Sagar, on 15 May. Homeward bound, She passed Saugor on 3 June, reached St Helena on 28 September. She arrived at the Downs on 12 December, but a gale came up on 16–7 December in which she lost an anchor and cable in Margate roads. Several other East Indiamen also suffered damage and Walpole, Sandlands, master, was driven aground.

On 24 December 1808, 15 seamen from Northampton's crew were delivered to the Royal Navy receiving ship HMS El Corso at Gravesend. The men had joined Northampton at Calcutta on 1 June. (Seamen on Indiamen were vulnerable to impressment on their return to England.)

=== EIC Voyage 5 (1809-10) ===
Sanders sailed Northampton from Portsmouth on 7 July 1809, bound for Bombay. She reached Madeira on 19 July, and Bombay on 24 November. Returning home, she visited Point de Galle on 22 February 1810, reached St Helena of 4 May, and arrived at the Downs on 6 July.

=== EIC Voyage 6 (1811-12) ===
Captain Thomas Barker resumed command of Northampton for her sixth voyage. The change of master again necessitated a new letter of marque, and Barker received one on 4 February 1811. Northampton left Portsmouth on 12 March, bound for Bombay and Madras. (Note: The National Archives reports that Northampton left on 12 May 1811, but Lloyd's List reported her at sea well before then, and at the Cape in early June.) Northampton was in convoy with a number of East Indiamen, Carnatic, Castle Eden, Hope. Metcalf, Princess Amelia, Rose, Taunton Castle, and Union. In April, Lloyd's List reported that they had been seen well at 35°42′N 15°0′W (approximately 400 km NNE of Funchal), and under the escort of the frigate HMS Curacoa. They reached the Cape on 9 June and Curacoa met up with them three days later.

Northampton arrived at Bombay on 20 July, and Madras on 3 September. She left Bombay on 21 August and Madras on 20 October. She then reached St Helena on 3 January 1812. There she joined Monarch and Euphrates, and the three vessels sailed on 21 January with HMS Java and HMS Madagascar as escorts.

While Northampton, Euprates, and Monarch were in the Channel, they encountered the British frigate Nayaden, which signalled that a flotilla of five French ships of the line that had escaped from Lorient were in the vicinity and that she had exchanged some shots with them. The French, bound for Brest, continued on their route without giving chase. Monarch and Euphrates arrived at Portsmouth on 23 March. Northampton arrived at the Downs on 30 March.

=== EIC Voyage 7 (1812-14) ===
Barker left Portsmouth for Bengal on 14 July 1812. Northampton reached Madeira on 30 July, the Cape on 21 October, and Colombo on 5 January 1813. She arrived at Calcutta on 16 March. Homeward bound, she passed Sagar on 12 May. However, she had to put back in Calcutta in early July because she was in a leaky state. She sprang a leak three times while descending the Bengal River and had to return to Calcutta to be docked. After repairs, she finally arrived at the Downs on 20 May 1814. Northampton acquired a new owner, Palmer & Co.

=== Convict transport (1815) ===
Northampton's next voyage was not for the EIC. Furthermore, with the wars with France and America drawing to a close, her master for this voyage did not acquire a letter of marque.

Under the command of John Tween, Northampton sailed from Portsmouth on 1 January 1815. WhenNorthampton sailed war had not ended. There are reports that an American privateer detained her on 18 February, but did not take her as a prize as the Americans did not want to deal with the prisoners. Northampton arrived at Port Jackson on 18 June. She had left with 110 female convicts, plus passengers and cargo. Four female convicts died on the voyage.

=== EIC Voyage 8 (1816) ===
Northampton left Port Jackson on 8 November bound for China. Northampton was "at China" on 14 January 1816 and arrived at Whampoa on 17 January.

She crossed the First Bar on the Pearl River on 2 March. She reached St Helena on 25 June and arrived at the Downs on 4 September.

=== EIC Voyage 9 (1818-19) ===
Captain Charles Tebbut (or Tebbutt) left Portsmouth on 16 May 1818, bound for Madras and Bengal. Northampton reached Madras on 7 September and arrived at Calcutta on 5 October. Homeward bound, she passed Sagar on 22 January 1819, reached St Helena on 26 March, and arrived at the Downs on 27 June.

Although one source reports that she was sold in 1819 for breaking up, she apparently made one more notable voyage.

=== Emigrant transport (1820) ===
A list of "Licensed India ships" showed Northampton, Tebbutt, master, Palmer, owner, sailing to Bencoolen on 17 November 1819. She did not.

Instead, Captain Charlton sailed from London on 13 December 1819, with 257 emigrants, bound for South Africa under the British Government's 1820 Settlers scheme. Northampton arrived at Table Bay, Cape Town, on 26 March 1820, and Algoa Bay, Port Elizabeth, on 30 April.

Northampton, Charlton, master, sailed from the Cape to Bengal, where she arrived on 31 August. She left Bengal for London and on 26 January 1821, was at 30°26′S 80°30′E. She arrived at the Cape on 28 February and left on 18 March. She arrived at Gravesend on 11 June. That is the last entry for her in Lloyd's List's ship arrival and departure data.

=== The registers ===
Northampton was last listed Lloyd's Register (LR) and the Register of Shipping (RS) in 1822. LR apparently carried stale data from 1819. The Register of Shipping carried the voyage to South Africa. The registers were only as accurate as owners chose to maintain them.

Year	Master	Owner	Trade	Source
1820	C. Tebbut	Palmer & Co.	London–India	LR; thorough repairs in 1809 and 1817
1820	Charlton	Tibbet & Co.	London–Cape of Good Hope	RS; good repair 1817
1822	C. Tebbut	Palmer & Co.	London–India	LR; thorough repair in 1817
1822	Charlton	Tibbet & Co.	London–Cape of Good Hope	RS; good repair 1817
