= Princess Mary (1796 ship) =

History

Great Britain
- Name: Princess Mary
- Owner: EIC voyages 1-3:Matthew White; EIC voyage 4:Joseph Smith; 1805:M. Agar; 1810:J&J Dawson; 1815:Johnson
- Builder: Bernard & Edward Adams, Bucklers Hard, Hampshire
- Launched: 7 July 1796
- Captured: 1794

General characteristics
- Tons burthen: 462, or 46226/94, 464, or 466 (bm)
- Length: Overall:116 ft 0 1/2 in (35.4 m); Keel:92 ft 11 in (28.3 m)
- Beam: 30 ft 7 in (9.3 m)
- Depth of hold: 12 ft 0 in (3.7 m)
- Complement: 1796:34; 1799:60; 1803:50
- Armament: 1796:10 × 6-pounder guns; 1799:10 × 6-pounder guns; 1803:10 × 6-pounder guns
- Notes: Three decks

Princess Mary was a ship launched in 1796 that made four voyages as an "extra ship" for the British East India Company (EIC). From 1805 on she was a West Indiaman, sailing primarily between London and Jamaica. In 1813 she suffered damage in a gale at Halifax, Nova Scotia, but returned to service. She was broken up in 1816.

== EIC voyages ==
The EIC engaged Princess Mary as an "extra ship" and she made four voyages for the company. Before she left on her first voyage, Captain James Nash acquired a letter of marque on 22 August 1798.

=== EIC voyage #1 (1796-1799) ===
Captain Nash sailed from Portsmouth on 26 October 1796, bound for Bengal and Madras. On 23 December Princess Mary was at the Cape of Good Hope; she arrived at Calcutta on 20 April. There the British government hired her to serve as a transport in a planned attack on Manila.

On 14 July she was at Diamond Harbour and on 3 August Kedgeree. She was at Penang on 1 September, and returned there on 13 October.

However, the British Government cancelled the invasion following a peace treaty with Spain and the British government released the vessels it had engaged. It paid Princess Mary's owners £10,148 13s 7d for her services.

On 11 December Princess Mary was at Madras and on 8 January 1798 at Colombo. She returned to Calcutta on 28 February. Homeward bound, she was at Saugor on 3 May, reached the Cape on 21 August and St Helena on 17 November, and arrived at The Downs on 3 February 1799.

After her return Peter Mestaer repaired her.

=== EIC voyage #2 (1799-1801) ===
Captain Nash sailed from Portsmouth on 18 November 1799, bound for St Helena and Bengal. Princess Mary reached St Helena on 29 January 1800, and arrived at Calcutta on 27 May. She was at Culpee on 30 July and Kedgeree on 27 August. Homewared bound, she reached the Cape on 8 January 1801 and St Helena on 28 January. She arrived back at The Downs on 10 April.

=== EIC voyage #3 (1801-1802) ===
Captain Andrew Grieve acquired a letter of marque on 10 August 1801. Princess Mary sailed from Portsmouth on 9 September 1801, bound for St Helena and Bengal. She was part of a convoy under escort by HMS Seahorse that also included General Stuart, Manship, Sarah Christiana, Northampton, Ann, Sovereign, Caledonia, Comet, Varuna, Carron, Elizabeth, Monarch, and Friendship. The convoy reached Madeira on 23 September, and left the next day.

Princess Mary reached St Helena on 2 December and arrived at Calcutta on 21 March 1802. Homeward bound, she was at Diamond Harbour on 11 May and Kedgeree on 25 May. She reached St Helena on 16 September and arrived at The Downs on 22 November.

=== EIC voyage #4 (1803-1805) ===
By the time Captain Grieve sailed again, war with France had resumed and he acquired a new letter of marque on 2 May 1803. He sailed from Portsmouth on 30 June, bound for Bengal. Princess Mary reached Rio de Janeiro on 16 September and arrived at Calcutta on 14 February. Homeward bound, she was at Diamond Harbour on 30 April and Saugor on 30 June. She reached St Helena on 18 October and arrived at The Downs on 12 January on 1805.

== West Indiaman ==
In 1805 Princess Mary was sold. She appears in Lloyd's Register for 1805 with B. Stout, master, M(oses) Agar, owner, and trade London–Jamaica.

Year	Master	Owner	Trade	Source
1810	Wilson	J&J Dawson	London–Jamaica	Register of Shipping
1815	J. Storey	J&J Dawson	London–Jamaica	Register of Shipping
1815	J.Storey; T.Ward	Dawsons; Johnson & Co.	London–Jamaica	Lloyd's Register
1816	Ward	Johnson	London–Bermuda	Register of Shipping

On 12 October 1812 Princess Mary, Storey, master, was at 44°33′N 12°10′W. She was part of a 30-vessel West Indies-bound convoy under escort by HMS Victorious. On 28 May 1813 Princess Mary, Storey, master, was in a convoy from Jamaica when she proved leaky. She left the convoy on 2 June and sailed for Halifax, Nova Scotia.

On 12 November a gale hit Halifax harbour, destroying or damaging many vessels, military and civilian. Princess Mary was among the vessels gathering to sail back to England under convoy by HMS Poictiers, which rode out the gale. The letter in Lloyd's List mentions Princess Mary three times, possibly referring to the same vessel as there are few other vessels by that name in Lloyd's Register. One other that may have been in Halifax at that time was a Falmouth packet, but none of the mentions refers to a packet ship. 1) Princess Mary, bound for London, was ashore having lost all but her foremast. 2) A Portuguese vessel ran afoul of Princess Mary, driving her from her moorings. Princess Mary went ashore on the rocks north of Tuft's Cove. 3) Princess Mary was got off but would have to land her cargo.

== Fate ==
On 29 January 1816 her entry in the Register was cancelled as her demolition had been completed.
