= Varuna (1796 ship) =

History

Great Britain
- Name: Varuna
- Namesake: Varuna
- Owner: 1796:Prinsep & Co.; 1803:J. Lowe; 1809:Bruce, Fawcett, and Co.
- Builder: Calcutta
- Launched: 2 April 1796 (Note: The British Library voyage summary, and Phipps, both give a launch year of 1795. However, Hackman gives a precise day and month in 1796. Lloyd's Register and the Register of Shipping also give a year of 1796.)
- Fate: Lost 1811

General characteristics
- Tons burthen: 520, 526, or 52648/94, or 548, or 700 (bm)
- Length: Overall:116 ft 8 in (35.6 m); keel:91 ft 11 1/4 in (28.0 m)
- Beam: 32 ft 9 3/4 in (10.0 m)
- Draft: 13 ft 10 1/2 in (4.2 m)
- Complement: 60
- Armament: 1796:12 × 6-pounder guns; 1805:18 × 9&6-pounder guns; 1806::2 × 4-pounder + 6 × 6-pounder guns
- Notes: Teak-built three-decker

Varuna (or Varunna) was launched at Calcutta in 1796. She made four voyages as an "extra ship" for the British East India Company (EIC), and then spent two years as a troopship. She returned to India in 1806. She was lost in 1811, probably in a typhoon.

== Career ==
EIC voyage #1 (1796–1797): Captain Henry Mathias Elmore sailed from Saugor on 31 May 1796, bound for England. Varuna was at Pondicherry on 6 July and reached St Helena on 11 October. She left there on 13 November and reached Bristol on 14 January 1797. She left Bristol on 10 March and arrived at The Downs on 25 March.

Varuna was admitted to the Registry of Great Britain on 11 May 1797. She then made three more voyages for the EIC after having undergone repairs by Barnard. She entered Lloyd's Register in 1797 (published in 1796), with H. Elmore, master, Princep & Co. owners, and trade London−Bengal.

EIC voyage #2 (1797–1799): The EIC chartered Varunna for one voyage at a rate of £24/ton for 550 measured tons, and £12/ton for surplus. Captain Elmore sailed from London on 5 July, and from Torbay on 22 September 1797, bound for Bengal and Madras. Varuna reached the Cape of Good Hope on 22 December and departed on 19 February 1798. She arrived at Diamond Harbour on 4 May. On his arrival at Calcutta Captain Elmore retired.

Homeward bound, she departed Kedgeree on 21 September and reached Madras on 13 October. She was at the Cape on 3 January 1799, reached St Helena on 9 February, which she left on 9 May, and arrived at The Downs on 13 July. By one report her master on her return was Thomas Thomas. She returned as part of the homeward-bound East India fleet under the escort of HMS Raisonable.

Varuna sailed from London on 20 November 1799 bound for Madras and Bengal with a cargo £45,000 declared value.

EIC voyage #3 (1800–1801): Captain William Ward Farrer sailed from Bengal in 1800, bound for England. Varuna left Saugor on 11 December 1800, reached the Cape on 15 February 1801 and St Helena on 7 March, and arrived at The Downs on 29 May. Varuna was part of a small convoy under escort by Buffalo that also included Minerva, Highland Chief, and Friendship.

The convoy also brought with it Colonel Robert Brooke, The former governor of St Helena. Varuna sailed back to Calcutta on 24 August 1801.

Varuna sailed from Portsmouth on 9 September 1801, bound for Bengal. She was part of a convoy under escort by HMS Seahorse that also included General Stuart, Manship, Sarah Christiana, Northampton, Ann, Sovereign, Caledonia, Comet, Princess Mary, Carron, Elizabeth, Monarch, and Friendship. The convoy reached Madeira on 23 September, and left the next day.

EIC voyage #4 (1803): Captain John Lowe sailed from Kedgeree on 19 February 1803, bound for England. Varuna reached St Helena on 19 May. She arrived at the River Shannon on 26 July and left on 14 August. She arrived at the Downs on 24 August.

=== Subsequent career ===
Between 1803 and 1805 Varuna served the Transport Board as a troopship.

The Register of Shipping for 1806 (published in 1805), gives the name of Varuna's master and owner as Dennison, and her trade as London–India. Captain Edward Stephenson Dennison acquired a letter of marque on 28 June 1805. He then sailed from London on 4 July, bound for India.

Varuna was one of the EIC vessels that were part of the expedition under General Sir David Baird and Admiral Sir Home Riggs Popham that would in 1806 capture the Dutch Cape Colony. They would carry supplies and troops to the Cape, and then continue on their voyages.

At 3:30 a.m. on 1 November, near Rocas Atoll at 3°51′27″N 33°48′57″W, HMS Leda sighted breakers and fired a gun, the signal to tack, herself barely missing the danger. King George was unable to tack and wrecked. As Britannia was on the point of tacking she ran afoul of Streatham and lost her bowsprit and foretopmast. She then drifted on to the atoll where she lost her rudder and bilged. In the morning Leda was able to rescue the survivors from King George and Comet, Europe, and Varuna sent their boats and were able to rescue about 400 people from Britannia, including Captain Brisk, his crew, and recruits for the EIC's armies.

At St Salvador Bay Biard hired her to take on board some of the crew and troops from Britannia and King George.

The British fleet, including Varuna, arrived in Table Bay on 5 January 1806 and anchored off Robben Island. The military and naval commanders paid the Government in Bengal £3370 for beer taken out of Varuna and issued to the King's ships. After Jansens, the Dutch Governor, signed a capitulation on the 18 January, and the British established control of the Cape Colony, Belliqueux escorted the East Indiamen After the Dutch Governor Jansens signed a capitulation on 18 January 1806, and the British established control of the Cape Colony, HMS Belliqueux escorted the East Indiamen William Pitt, Jane, Duchess of Gordon, Sir William Pulteney, and Comet to Madras. The convoy included the Northampton, Streatham, Europe, Union, Glory, and Sarah Christiana.

== Fate ==
Varuna appears to have sailed as a country ship, i.e., in the East Indies and possibly to China, after her return to India.

Varuna arrived in Calcutta on 9 October 1806 from Penang, having sailed from there on 4 October. She carried Captain Forest, whose ship Sydney had wrecked at New Guinea.

An 1809 listing of vessels belonging to Bombay lists Varuna. with George Douglas, master, and Bruce, Fawcett, and Co., owners.

Varuna, Douglas, master, appears in a list of country ships lost in the India and China Seas. Varuna was lost in the China Seas in 1811, presumed to have foundered in a typhoon.
