= Minerva (1773 ship) =

History

Great Britain
- Name: Minerva
- Namesake: Minerva
- Owner: Robert Charnock; 1802: James Pycroft
- Builder: Bombay
- Launched: 1773
- Fate: Lost c.1806

General characteristics
- Tons burthen: Originally: 440, or 441, or 558; 1802:560; 1803 & 1804:564 (bm)
- Length: 1802: 118 ft 3 1/4 in (36.0 m) (overall); 93 ft 0 in (28.3 m) (keel)
- Beam: 1802: 33 ft 18 in (10.5 m)
- Depth of hold: 15 ft 0 in (4.6 m)
- Complement: 1803: 50; 1804: 35
- Armament: 8 carriage guns + 2 swivel guns; 1803: 16 × 6-pounder guns; 1804: 2 × 9-pounder guns + 12 × 24-pounder carronades; 1806: 14 × 24-pounder carronades

Minerva was a merchantman launched in 1773, in the East Indies. She traded there for more than 20 years before she made three voyages for the British East India Company (EIC). The first EIC voyage was from 1796 to 1798. In 1799, she transported convicts from Ireland to Australia while under charter to the EIC. From Australia she sailed to Bengal, and then back to Britain. She underwent repairs in 1802, and then traveled to St Helena and Bengal for the EIC. She was lost in 1805 or 1806, under circumstances that are currently unclear.

== EIC voyage #1 (1796-98) ==
Captain Thomas Blany (or Blamey) sailed Minerva from Southampton on 22 May 1796, bound for Bengal. She reached Gibraltar on 14 June, Santa Cruz de Tenerife on 8 July, and the Cape on 19 September. She arrived at Diamond Harbour on 10 February 1797.

The British government planned an expedition 1797-8, against Manila. The EIC held eight regular ships, and three "dismantled ships" in India to support the expedition, and hired some others. Minerva, one of the hired vessels, left Calcutta on 25 April, and passed Diamond Harbour on 3 May. However, a peace treaty with Spain resulted in the British cancelling the planned expedition. Minerva's owners claimed demurrage; the amount they claimed was £2,508 6s 8d for 106 days.

Homeward bound, Minerva, reached the Cape on 29 August, and St Helena on 29 September. She arrived at the Downs on 30 January 1798.

Lloyd's List for 2 February 1798, reported that Minerva, Blaney, master, had run afoul of Castor, Salkeld, master, from Bengal, in the Downs. Castor was on shore at Ramsgate, and the cargo was expected to be saved.

Minerva was admitted to the Registry of Great Britain on 14 April 1798.

== Convict transport and EIC voyage #2 (1799-1801) ==
Under the command of Joseph Salkeld (or Stalkeld), Minerva left the Downs, on 6 August 1798, arriving in Cork on 10 August 1798. The government had compelled the EIC to charter the vessels the government had engaged as convict ships, rather than chartering the EIC's East Indiamen to carry convicts. The EIC had originally refused to charter Minerva, but under government duress the EIC reversed its original decision, chartered Minerva for a voyage from India on her homeward journey from Port Jackson, and waived its usual surveys.

Minerva's departure was initially delayed due to the brig Lively, commanded by Captain Dobson, not arriving in Cork until 29 January 1799. Further delay then occurred due to the poor health of Irish political prisoners Lively had carried down from Dublin. These combined to postpone Minerva's departure by more than a year. Surgeon John Washington Price, inspecting Lively, recorded in his journal that the prisoners were, ‘in the most wretched, cruel and pitiable condition I’d ever seen human beings in’. He further recorded, 'It appears to me that Mr. Dobson endeavors to aggravate the punishment of these wretches by every means in his power.' Seven of Lively's prisoners died before the remainder were eventually transferred to Minerva, along with other rebel prisoners from Cork's North Gate Bridge Gaol before it sailed from Cork, Ireland on 24 August 1799, with 165 male and 26 female convicts. Three children of convicts and a fourth belonging to Joseph Holt were born during the voyage. Minerva also carried a detachment of 20 men from the New South Wales Marine Corps to guard the prisoners, and several passengers. One passenger was Joseph Holt, who as a general for the United Irish, had led a large guerrilla force that had fought against British troops in County Wicklow from June–October 1798. A second passenger was Henry Fulton, who was a clergyman in the Diocese of Killaloe, and who also had been involved in the Irish Rebellion of 1798. Both men travelled to Australia with their families, all sharing a cabin. They were not convicts per se. Holt was among seven transportees who had agreed to self-exile in lieu of punishment. Fulton may have been numbered among the 70 men classified as political prisoners. A third notable passenger was Captain William Cox, who had been appointed paymaster of the New South Wales Corps.

Minerva sailed in company with Friendship and some other vessels. On 14 September, Minerva parted from Friendship, and their escort, HMS Dryad, left them to return to Ireland. Two weeks later, on 30 September, Minerva exchanged shots at some distance with two strange vessels that sported Portuguese colors, but both sides did not pursue the matter. Three days after that Minerva encountered two Spanish vessels, a galleon and what appeared to be a prison ship. The British made ready to fight as Spain was an enemy of Britain's. The British also permitted Holt to form a gun crew from among the political prisoners, they having agreed to fight. As Minerva approached, the supposed prison ship fired a broadside. At that, Salkeld sailed away, and so did the Spaniards. Later, Holt admitted that had the Spanish boarded, he and his men would have mutinied.

Minerva reached Rio de Janeiro on 10 October, and arrived at Port Jackson on 11 January 1800. She arrived there a month before Friendship. Three male convicts died on the voyage; this was a particularly low rate for such a long voyage. Salkeld had a liberal attitude with respect to restrictions on the conduct of the female convicts and a number of marriages eventuated. Holt later credited Cox with fostering the humane treatment of the prisoners that had resulted in the low death rate, and ended up managing Cox's farm.

Minerva left Port Jackson for Bengal in April 1800. She arrived at Calcutta on 7 June. Homeward bound, she passed Kedgeree on 27 October, reached St Helena on 24 February 1801, and Ascension Island on 22 March, and arrived at the Downs on 26 May. She had travelled with several other EIC "extra ships", viz Varuna, William Ward Farrer, master, Highland Chief, Scott, master, and Friendship. HMS Buffalo, a 12-gun storeship, had been their escort.

In 1802, Minerva changed hands, and underwent extensive repairs by Perry. At this time she had her measurements taken, and her burthen was reported as changing from 440 tons to 560 tons. Her new owner was James Pycroft, and her new master became George Weltden.

Lloyd's Register
Year	Master	Owner	Trade	Notes
1801	J. Stalkeld	Charrock	Cork – Botany Bay	441 tons (bm)
1802	J. Stalkeld; G. Wilsden	Charrock; J. Pycroft	Cork - Botany Bay; London - India	440 tons (bm); 567 tons (bm)
1803	G. Wilsden	J. Pycroft	London - India	558 tons (bm)

== EIC voyage #3 (1802-1803) ==
Weltden left the Downs on 14 June 1802, bound for St Helena and Bengal, and in company with the East Indiaman Lord Eldon. One of the passengers on board was Henry Salt, who would later go on to become consul general in Egypt and a noted Egyptologist; he was travelling as secretary to Viscount Lord Valentia. Minerva reached Madeira around 29 June, and St Helena on 20 August. From there she reached the Cape on 20 October. At the Cape she picked up the future General Vandeleur and a portion of the 8th Light Dragoons. She separated from Lord Eldon at the Cape and reached the Nicobar Islands on 5 January 1803; she arrived at Calcutta on 29 January. On her homeward bound trip she passed Saugor on 10 March, reached the Nicobars again on 13 April, Colombo on 10 May, St Helena on 2 August, and Cork on 29 November, and arrived at the Downs on 12 December.

Minerva had left Britain during the Peace of Amiens, which broke down in March 1803. Weltden received a letter of marque dated 6 July 1803, i.e., after he had left.

== Later career ==
The 1803 Lloyd's Register notes that Minerva had a new master, one Dodds by name. The letter of marque issued on 11 October 1804, to "Dods", shows her armament as two 9-pounder guns and twelve 24-pounder carronades.

The 1806 Lloyd's Register shows Minerva as travelling between London and Barbados, and armed with fourteen 24-pounder carronades. The entries continue relatively unchanged through the 1808 Lloyd's Register, and then end. However, the Register of Shipping for 1806 has a voyage of London—Jamaica, and the notation "LOST".
