= Comet (1800 ship) =

History

Great Britain
- Name: Comet
- Namesake: Comet
- Owner: John St Barbe
- Builder: Pitcher, Northfleet
- Launched: 29 March 1800
- Fate: Lost 1815, or 1816

General characteristics
- Tons burthen: 529, or 5291/94, or 535, or 553 (bm)
- Length: 120 ft 1 1/2 in (36.6 m) (overall)*95 ft 7 1/2 in (29.1 m) (keel)
- Beam: 32 ft 2 in (9.8 m)
- Depth of hold: 12 ft 5 in (3.8 m)
- Propulsion: Sail
- Complement: 1801:50; 1803:50; 1805:50; 1808:40; 1809:47
- Armament: 1800:4 × 4-pounder + 2 × 6-pounder guns + 10 × 18-pounder carronades; 1801:16 × 6&18&24-pounder cannons; 1803:16 × 12-pounder guns; 1805:12 × 12&6-pounder guns; 1808:20 × 6&9&12&18-pounder guns; 1809:20 × 18&12&9&6-pounder guns; 1815:8 × 6-pounder + 2 × 9-pounder guns
- Notes: Three decks

Comet was launched in 1800 on the Thames. In 1801 she made a voyage under charter to the British East India Company (EIC). On her second voyage, in 1803, the French captured her. Still, in 1804 her previous owners were able to reacquire her. She then made another voyage for the EIC. On her return she first served as a troopship and then in the West Indies trade. She apparently was lost in 1815 or 1816.

== Career ==
Comet's first voyage, under the command of Captain J. Mooring, was to Surinam. (Mooring or Moring had come from Duckenfield Hall, another St Barbe ship.) St Barbe then chartered Comet to the EIC, which first had Wells inspect and measure her.

Captain Thomas Larkins (or Larkens), received a letter of marque on 22 June 1801. Comet left Portsmouth on 9 September 1801, bound for Bengal. She was part of a convoy under escort by HMS Seahorse that also included General Stuart, Manship, Sarah Christiana, Northampton, Sovereign, Caledonia, Ann, Princess Mary, Varuna, Carron, Elizabeth, Monarch, and Friendship. The convoy reached Madeira on 23 September, and left the next day.

Comet arrived at Calcutta on 9 February 1802. Homeward bound, she was at Diamond Harbour on 7 May, before returning to Calcutta on 23 May. Comet had grounded in the Bengal River and had to put back for repairs. Again homeward bound, she was at Diamond Harbour on 7 July, and Kedgeree on 2 August. She reached St Helena on 8 November, and arrived at Long Reach on 5 January 1803.

Prior to Comet's ill-fated, second voyage for the EIC, Captain James Moring received a letter of marque on 20 May 1803. (He had been first officer under Larkin on Comet's first voyage.) He sailed from Portsmouth on 21 June 1803, bound for St Helena and Bengal. On 1 July the French captured Comet 160-190 leagues north of Madeira. The French squadron, which consisted of five ships of the line and some frigates, had been returning to France from San Domingo. They took Comet into Ferrol.

The French liberated their English prisoners promptly. By September Moring was in English hands, revealing what he had seen at Ferrol.

A year later Comet too was back in English hands. The French had sold Comet at A Coruña (across the bay from Ferrol), to an American company in London. The Americans then sent her in August in ballast to England. While she was on her way, HMS Northumberland, flagship to Admiral Alexander Cochrane, detained her and sent her into Plymouth, where she arrived on 2–3 September 1804.

Lloyd's Register for 1805 shows Comet, "Mooring", master, and St Barbe, owner, with trade London—India. Captain James Moring received a letter of marque on 15 March 1805. Comet left Cork on 31 August, bound for Madras and Bengal. She was at Madeira on 29 September.

Comet was one of the EIC vessels that were part of the expedition under General Sir David Baird and Admiral Sir Home Riggs Popham that would in 1806 capture the Dutch Cape Colony. They would carry supplies and troops to the Cape, and then continue on their voyages.

At 3:30 a.m. on 1 November, near Rocas Atoll at 3°51′27″N 33°48′57″W, HMS Leda sighted breakers and fired a gun, the signal to tack, herself barely missing the danger. King George was unable to tack and wrecked. As Britannia was on the point of tacking she ran afoul of Streatham and lost her bowsprit and foretopmast. She then drifted on to the atoll where she lost her rudder and bilged. In the morning Leda was able to rescue the survivors from King George and Comet, Europe, and Varuna sent their boats and were able to rescue about 400 people from Britannia, including Brisk, his crew, and recruits for the EIC's armies.

Comet was at San Salvador on 12 November, and the Cape of Good Hope on 6 January 1806. Shortly after she arrived the cannon fire from the battle of Blaauwberg (8 January) could be heard.

The captains of the Indiamen William Pitt, Jane, Duchess of Gordon, Sir William Pulteney, and Comet made themselves useful during the operations. After the Dutch Governor Jansens signed a capitulation on the 18 January and the British established control of the Cape Colony, Belliqueux escorted the East Indiamen to Madras.

Comet reached Madras on 22 April. At Madras, the captains of the eight East Indiamen in the convoy joined together to present Captain George Byng, of Belliqueux, a piece of silver plate worth £100 as a token of appreciation for his conduct while they were under his orders. Byng wrote his thank you letter to them on 24 April.

Comet reached Masulipatnam on 5 June and arrived at Calcutta on 17 June. Homeward bound, Comet was at Culpee on 18 August, Saugor on 24 September, Madras again on 10 October, Trincomalee on 18 October, the Cape on 30 December, and St Helena on 23 January 1807. She arrived at Blackwall on 15 April.

Comet apparently served as a troopship before her owners placed her in the West Indies trade. Captain George Higton received a letter of marque for Comet on 22 February 1808, but there is no sign in online resources that he actually took command. Captain James McDonald received a letter of marque on 7 February 1809, but the supplemental pages to Lloyd's Register for 1808 already list him as master.

== Fate ==
Year	Master	Owner	Trade	Source
1815	J.Wilson	Dawson & Co.	London—Gibraltar	Lloyd's Register
1815	Burnell	T&J Dawson	London—St Croix	Register of Shipping
1816	Wilson	Dawson & Co.	London—Jamaica	Lloyd's Register

One source states that Comet was lost at sea in 1816. Lloyd's List has no mention of the loss of a Comet in 1816. It does list two as being lost in 1815. On 7 July 1815 it reported that Comet, Wilson, master, had been lost on 29 June on West Hoyle sandbank as she was sailing from Dublin to Chester. The crew was saved.
