= Carron (1792 ship) =

History

Great Britain
- Name: Carron
- Owner: Bruce, Fawcett & Co.
- Builder: Bombay Dockyard
- Launched: 21 July 1792
- Fate: Sold to Royal Navy 1805

United Kingdom
- Name: HMS Duncan
- Namesake: Admiral Adam Duncan
- Acquired: 1805 by purchase
- Renamed: HMS Dover in 1807
- Fate: Wrecked 2 May 1811

General characteristics
- Class & type: Fifth rate
- Tons burthen: 990, or 1072 (bm)
- Length: c.130 ft (39.6 m)
- Beam: c.35 ft (10.7 m)
- Sail plan: Full-rigged ship
- Complement: Carron:100; Duncan:35
- Armament: Carron:20 × 12&4-pounder guns; Duncan:38 guns
- Notes: Teak-built

Carron was launched at Bombay Dockyard in July 1792. She was a country ship that made several voyages for the British East India Company (EIC) before the Royal Navy purchased her in 1804 to use as a fifth-rate frigate, and renamed Duncan. In 1807 the Navy renamed her Dover. She was wrecked off Madras on 2 May 1811.

== EIC voyages ==
Carron made several voyages for the EIC.

In 1795 Captain Francis Simpson sailed from Bengal for China, and then for Britain. Carron was at Whampoa on 24 November 1795, crossed the Second Bar on 11 January 1796, and left China on 15 February. She reached Saint Helena on 5 May, and arrived at Long Reach on 8 August.

Carron was admitted to the Registry in Great Britain on 23 November 1796. Simpson received a letter of marque on 25 November. He then sailed for China and Bengal on 27 November.

In August 1797 Surat Castle arrived at Portsmouth from the West Indies. She was one of five vessels that the government had chartered to carry invalids and prisoners from the West Indies. The other four were Bombay Anna, Bengal Anna, Surat Castle, and Coromandel. In August the Directors of the EIC agreed to permit Bombay Anna, Bengal Anna, Carron, and Surat Castle to return to the Indies with exports to proceed to China and then to return to England with early cargoes for the EIC, in accordance with the engagement they had entered into before they had gone to the West Indies at the government's behest.

In 1799 Simpson sailed from China for Britain. Carron was at Lintin on 9 February 1799, and at Malacca on 22 February. She reached St Helena on 11 May, and arrived at The Downs in July.

She then returned to Bombay, leaving Britain on 13 February 1800. When she left England she was in company with Cuvera, Scaleby Castle, and Minerva. She returned from Bombay on 17 June 1801.

Carron sailed from Portsmouth on 9 September 1801. She was part of a convoy under escort by HMS Seahorse that also included General Stuart, Manship, Sarah Christiana, Northampton, Ann, Sovereign, Caledonia, Comet, Varuna, Princess Mary, Elizabeth, Monarch, and Friendship. The convoy reached Madeira on 23 September, and left the next day.

On 14 February 1804 Carron was one of 11 country ships present at the Battle of Pulo Aura, though she took no part in the engagement. She, like the rest of the flotilla of East Indiamen and country ships, was coming back from China.

== HMS Duncan ==
Rear-Admiral Edward Pellew, took up the post of Commander-in-Chief of the East Indies Station in 1805. He purchased Carron that year and named her HMS Duncan.

Initially she was under the command of Lieutenant Clement Sneyd (acting). Under his command she captured a number of French vessels.

On 11 October Duncan captured the French sloop Pincon, of 30 tons, which was sailing from Madagascar to a port north-west, when Duncan took her off St Dennis and destroyed her at sea;

Prior to 7 November Duncan captured Emilie, a French privateer, after an engagement off Réunion. On 7 November, as Duncan was sailing into the main anchorage at Mahé, Seychelles, Sneyd observed a strange sail anchored between the islands of Thérèse and Conception and sent Emilie to investigate.

On 9 November Emilie rejoined Duncan, having with her the French brig Courier, of 280 tons, fitted as a slaver. Courier (or Courier des Seycelles) was based in the Seychelles and the governor, Jean Baptiste Quéau de Quincy, protested to Sneyd that it was one of the vessels that the capitulation of the Seychelles exempted from seizure. (Note: In 1794, when the first British warships arrived at the Seychelles, Quncy (or Quinssy), did not offer any resistance. Instead, he successfully negotiated a capitulation to Britain that gave the settlers a privileged position of neutrality.)

As soon as the captain of Courier des Seychelles saw Duncan and Emilie, he hid on shore the 200 slaves that he had been carrying. He also hid his all his cables and anchors. Sneyd sent search parties that succeeded in despoiling the homes of owners of Courier des Seychellles, and bringing back her sails, cables and anchors. However, not only did they not find the 200 slaves, but four British sailors deserted, with their weapons, and also could not be found. While at Mahé, Duncan's crew captured the French brig Sirius, of 80 tons (bm), carrying a cargo of gum, rosin, and plank, French brig of unknown name, of 90 tons (bm). This brig the British burned. Sneyd sent his men on punitive raids along the west coast. They fired on and forced to run aground at Anse Boileau a brig coming from Madagascar. They also found and set on fire Rosalie, a small vessel undergoing repairs at Anse á la Mouche. It is possible that Sirius was the brig coming from Madagascar, and Rosalie the brig of 90 tons.

Sneyd and Duncan stayed less than a week at Mahé before sailing off with Emilie and Courier des Seychelles. (Note: In May 1808 the proceeds of the sale of the vessels Courier and Emilie were deposited in the High Court of Admiralty.)

On 27 November Duncan captured the French schooner Cacotte, of 70 tons (bm), pierced for eight guns but only carrying four. She was carrying cocoa nuts when Duncan captured her off Diego Garcia.

Lieutenant Charles Hawtayne (acting) replaced Sneyd. Not long thereafter Pellew appointed Hawtayne governor of the naval hospital at Madras. Captain Lord George Stuart replaced him as captain of Duncan.

On 8 April 1806 Duncan captured the French privateer Île de France, of 8 guns and 71 men, at sea and destroyed her. Head money was paid in November 1827 for 69 men. (Note: A first-class share of the prize money was worth £102 11¼d; a fifth-class share, that of a seaman, was worth 6s 6¼.) (Note: French records indicate that on 15 May 1806, the French frigate Sémillante recaptured Île de France, but scuttled her as she was "of low value and a poor sailer".)

In June 1806 Duncan, still under Stuart's command, returned to Mahé. This time Quincy quickly arranged a renewal of the capitulation with Stuart. A few days later the 74-gun Russell joined Duncan. Both vessels stayed only a few days to replenish their water and provisions before sailing off. This time too, some four crew members from Duncan took the opportunity to desert successfully.

== HMS Dover ==
In 1807 Duncan was registered with the Admiralty (on 24 March), and received the name HMS Dover. In the summer, Stuart was appointed to Aimable. Captain Edward Tucker replaced Stuart on Dover.

In February 1810 Captain Tucker commanded a small squadron comprising Dover, the frigate Cornwallis, and the sloop Samarang. Their objective was the island of Amboyna. On their way, on 6 February Dover captured the Dutch brig-of-war Rambang.

The British launched their attack on 16 February, capturing one battery that overlooked the port, the city of Ambon, and Fort Victoria. They then took another battery. During the night, Samarang landed forty men, who were joined by two field pieces from Dover. These joined in the bombardment of Fort Victoria from the two captured batteries. On 18 February the town capitulated. British casualties were extremely light, with only three dead, one of whom was a marine from Samarang.

During the campaign the British captured several Dutch vessels. One was the Dutch brig Mandurese, Captain Guasteranus. She had 12 guns. She was one of three vessels sunk in the inner harbor of Amboyna. However, the British raised her after the island surrendered. They took her into service as Mandarin. (Note: In January 1816, Dover, Cornwallis, and Samarang received a last payment of prize money for Amboyna and the vessels captured there. A first-class share was worth £991 13s 9d; a sixth-class share was worth £9 2s 3d.) (Note: A payment for certain public property captured on and around Amboyna was also large. A first-class share was worth £1,637 6d; a sixth-class share was worth £15 10½d.) From Amboyna, the squadron went on to capture the islands of Saparua, Harouka, Nasso-Laut, Buru, and Manipa.

After the attack on Amboyna, Samarang captured the Dutch brig Recruiter on 28 March. Samarang shared the prize money by agreement with Dover and Cornwallis. (Note: A first-class share was worth £23 18s 9½d; a sixth-class share was worth 3s 10d.)

Between 29 April and 18 May, Dover, Cornwallis, and Samarang captured Engelina and Koukiko.

On 26 June Dover captured the island of Manado. (Note: A first-class share of the prize money was worth £270 9s; a sixth-class share was worth £2 8s 7½d.)

== Fate ==
Dover was at Madras Roads on 1 May 1811 undergoing a refit when a major gale struck. She was at anchor, with topmasts struck and foreyard lowered. Tucker had gone ashore and so she was under the command of Lieutenant Charles Jeffries. Although Jeffries dropped a second anchor and later a bower anchor after her anchor cable parted, a sudden squall drove her into the northeast corner of Fort Saint George during the night of 2 May. Despite attempts to save her, the storm battered her against the fort's walls until she foundered. Two men drowned.

The violent gale also claimed the transport Chichester, several merchant vessels, and some 70 small craft. (Note: In addition to enumerating many of the vessel losses, Lloyd's List allocated the two naval sailors who drowned to Chichester.)
