= Friendship (1793 ship) =

History

Great Britain
- Name: Friendship
- Namesake: Friendship
- Owner: 1794: Oldham & Co.; 1797: John and James Mangles
- Builder: William & John Wells, Rotherhithe
- Launched: 26 August 1793
- Fate: She was deleted from the registry on 5 July 1819, having been broken up

General characteristics
- Tons burthen: 1793: 339 or 341; 1797: 407, 40716/94, or 430 (bm)
- Length: 118 ft 0 in (36.0 m) (overall); 96 ft 4 in (29.4 m) (keel)
- Beam: 28 ft 2 1/4 in (8.6 m)
- Depth of hold: 12 ft 2 1/2 in (3.7 m)
- Complement: 1796:20; 1797:24; 1799:24; 1801:28
- Armament: 1794: 6 × 12-pounder guns; 1796: 10 × 12-pounder guns + 2 swivel guns; 1797: 6 × 12-pounder guns; 1799: 10 × 6-pounder guns + 2 × 18-pounder carronades + 12 × swivel guns; 1801: 10 × 6-pounder guns; 1809: 2 × 6-pounder guns + 10 × 18-pounder carronades

Friendship was a three-decker merchantman, launched in 1793. She made three voyages for the British East India Company (EIC). During her first voyage, in 1796, a French privateer captured her, but the Royal Navy recaptured her. On the second, in 1799, she transported convicts from Ireland to Australia. She made a second voyage transporting convicts in 1817-18. On her way back she was broken up in 1819, at Mauritius after having been found unseaworthy.

== Career ==
In 1794, Friendship was under the command of Captain Thomas Black and sailing between London and Jamaica. Lloyd's Register for 1795, continues the information unchanged. Lloyd's Register for 1796, shows Friendship changing her trade to London-Cape of Good Hope.

=== EIC voyage #1 (1796) ===
Captain Black received a letter of marque on 16 February 1796. Friendship left Portsmouth on 23 February 1796, bound for Bengal. She reached São Tiago on 5 April, Simons Bay on 28 May, and the Cape on 13 June.

On 27 October, Friendship was on her way home when the French privateer Aventure captured her and placed her crew on the American ship Henry. The capture took place at 50°17′N 13°30′E and her captor sent Friendship towards France. On 4 November HMS Cerberus recaptured Friendship and sent her into Plymouth.

=== Restoration ===
Lloyd's Register for 1797, showed several changes: J. Newham replaced Black as master, and her trade changed to London-Bengal. However the most dramatic change was that her burthen changed from 341 tons (bm) to 430 tons (bm). The explanation rests in the annotations: Friendship had undergone lengthening. Her ownership remains Oldham & Co. However, the next year Lloyd's Register reported it as having changed to Mangles & Co.

=== EIC voyage #2 (1797–98) ===
Captain John Newham received a letter of marque on 11 April 1797. For Friendship's second voyage for the EIC, Newham left Falmouth on 11 May 1797, bound for Bengal and Madras. Friendship arrived at Calcutta on 28 October. Homeward bound, she was at Saugor on 21 January 1798. She reached Madras on 4 February, the Cape on 26 May, and St Helena on 26 May. She arrived at Long Reach on 4 August.

=== Convict transport and EIC voyage #3 ===
On 4 March 1799, Captain Hugh Reid received a letter of marque for Friendship.

Friendship, under Reid's command, sailed from Cork, Ireland on 24 August 1799. She left in company with Minerva, but the vessels separated and Friendship arrived at Port Jackson on 16 February 1800, a month after Minerva. Friendship left with 133 male convicts, a number of whom were members of the Society of United Irishmen. Among them were Fr James Dixon, who would become the first Catholic priest permitted to minister in Australia, and James Meehan, later a prominent surveyor. Nineteen convicts died on the voyage. The captain's wife, Mary Ann Reid, wrote an account of the voyage.

Friendship left Port Jackson for Bengal on 11 May 1800.

Friendship reached Malacca on 9 August, Penang on 20 August, and Diamond Harbour on 16 September. For her return to Britain she passed Culpee, an anchorage towards Calcutta and closer than Saugor, on 29 November. On 1 March 1801, she reached St Helena and on 30 May, she arrived at Long Reach. She had been part of a small convoy under escort by Buffalo that also included Minerva, Varuna, and Highland Chief.

=== Subsequent career ===
On 15 August 1801, Captain James Smith of Friendship received a letter of marque. He sailed from Portsmouth on 9 September, bound for India. Monarch was part of a convoy under escort by HMS Seahorse that also included Northampton, Manship, Sarah Christiana, Comet, Sovereign, Caledonia, Ann, Princess Mary, Varuna, Carron, Elizabeth, General Stuart, and Monarch. The convoy reached Madeira on 23 September, and left the next day.

Lloyd's Register for 1803, gives Friendship's trade as London to Jamaica. In 1809, her trade changes to London to Cape of Good Hope, and her armament changes too, though there is no change in ownership or master. By 1811, her trade is again London - Jamaica. In 1813, her master becomes E. Smith.

=== Second convict voyage (1817–18) ===
Friendship, under the command of Captain Armet and with surgeon Peter Cosgreave, left England on 3 July 1817, and arrived at Port Jackson on 14 January 1818. She carried 101 female convicts, four of whom died on the voyage.

South west of Madeira, Friendship encountered an open boat with six Spaniards and an American on board. The men had fashioned sails out of their shirts, and were exhausted and hungry, having had nothing but a little raw turtle in the preceding six days. Armet took the men aboard and on 7 August, was able to transfer them to an American ship.

During the voyage there was apparently a great deal of prostitution by the female convicts on what had been a fairly lengthy voyage of 194 days. The problem had begun before the ship left England and despite the efforts of Armet and Cosgreave, continued unabated. When Friendship reached St Helena, Cosgreave asked the admiral in charge of the station for assistance in prohibiting cohabitation between the women and the ship's officers and seamen; two post captains made an inquiry, but without any resolution. When Friendship reached Port Jackson, Governor Macquarie appointed three magistrates to conduct a second, separate inquiry that exonerated Armet and Cosgreave of any dereliction of duty.

== Fate ==
Friendship, Armet, master, arrived at Port Louis, Mauritius on 5 August 1818, from Sumatra. There she was surveyed and condemned as being unseaworthy. Lloyd's List reported that she and her cargo were to be sold on 23 September. Friendship was broken up in 1819.
