= Battle of Skopelos =

- Part of the Anglo-Turkish War of 1807–1809
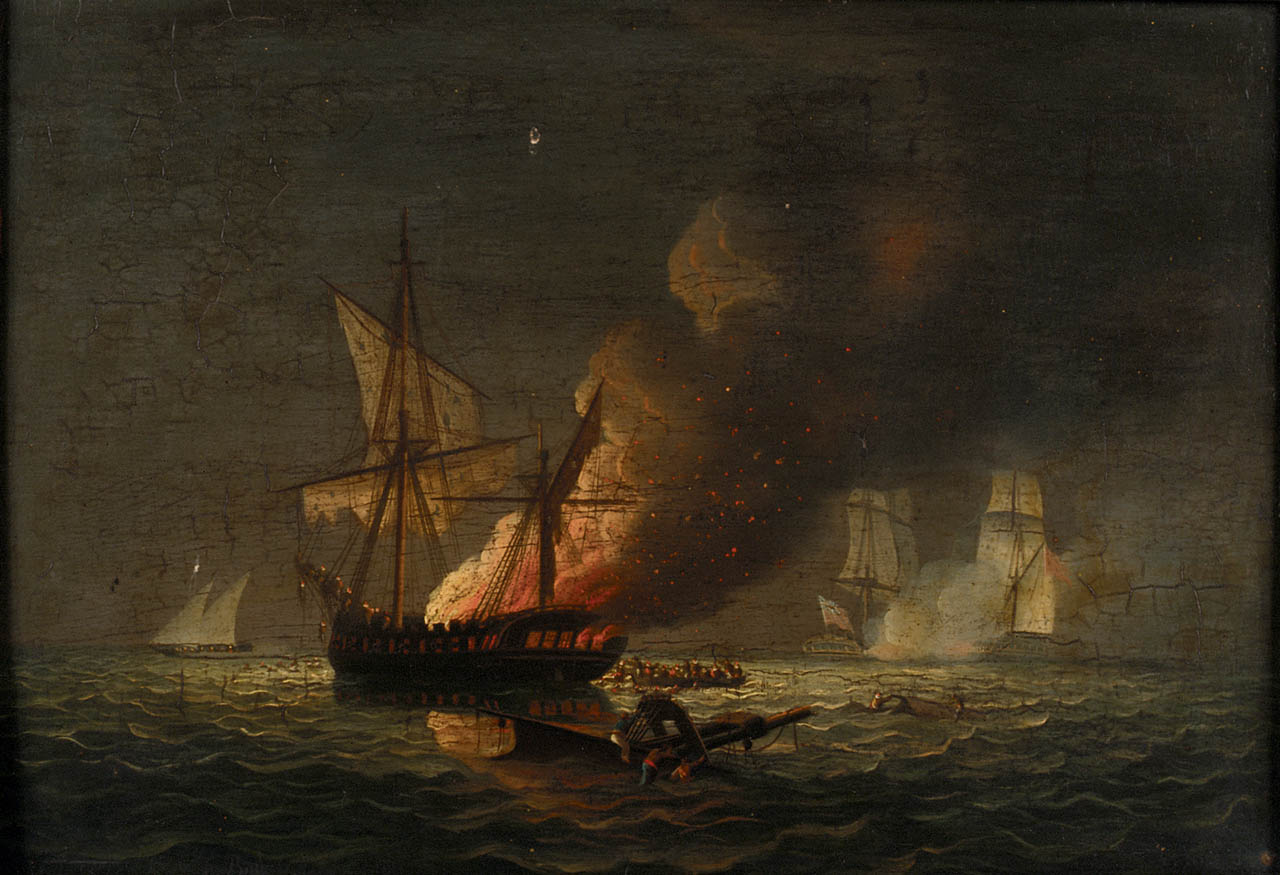
- Painting of the battle by Thomas Buttersworth
| Date | 5–6 July 1808 |
| Location | Off Skopelos, Aegean Sea |
| Result | British victory |

Belligerents
| United Kingdom | Ottoman Empire |

Commanders and leaders
| John Stewart | Albay Scandril Küçük Ali (surrendered); Yarbay Duragardi Ali |

Strength
| 1 frigate | 1 frigate 1 corvette |

Casualties and losses
| 5 killed 10 wounded | 170 killed 200 wounded 1 frigate captured |

The Battle of Skopelos was fought on 5–6 July 1808 off Skopelos in the Aegean Sea during the Anglo-Turkish War of 1807–1809. It involved the 38-gun British frigate HMS Seahorse against the 52-gun Ottoman frigate Bedr-i Zafer and 26-gun corvette Alis Fezzan. Bedr-i Zafer surrendered after a hard fight; while Alis Fezzan withdrew damaged.

== Battle ==
On 1 July 1808, while anchored off Syros, Captain John Stewart of HMS Seahorse learned that Ottoman Navy warships were operating near Chiliodromia in the Northern Sporades and weighed anchor to investigate. Seahorse was caught in heavy squalls and briefly forced to triple-reef her topsails. The weather moderated by the afternoon of 5 July, when she sighted two men-of-war and gave chase. All three ships ran south on a northerly breeze as Stewart prepared for action and moved Seahorse onto the windward quarter of the larger vessel.

Stewart soon identified the larger ship as Ottoman and, aware that she was likely better manned than the already understrength Seahorse, attempted to compel her surrender by sending a Gibraltarian pilot fluent in Turkish to hail the stranger. The senior Ottoman captain, Albay Scandril Küçük Ali, ignored the demand; Stewart then ordered a double-shotted broadside into the vessel. Scandril returned fire and a sharp action developed before he eased away to allow his consort, the 26-gun Alis Fezzan under Yarbay Duragardi Ali, to engage Seahorse. When Alis Fezzan fired across the stern of Scandril's ship, Bedr-i Zafer, Scandril attempted to maneuver alongside Seahorse with the apparent intention of boarding. Anticipating this, Stewart put Seahorse into the wind and brought her round onto the larboard tack, exposing his starboard battery and preventing the Ottoman ship from closing for boarding. Scandril then wore ship and both Ottoman vessels turned back east on converging courses.

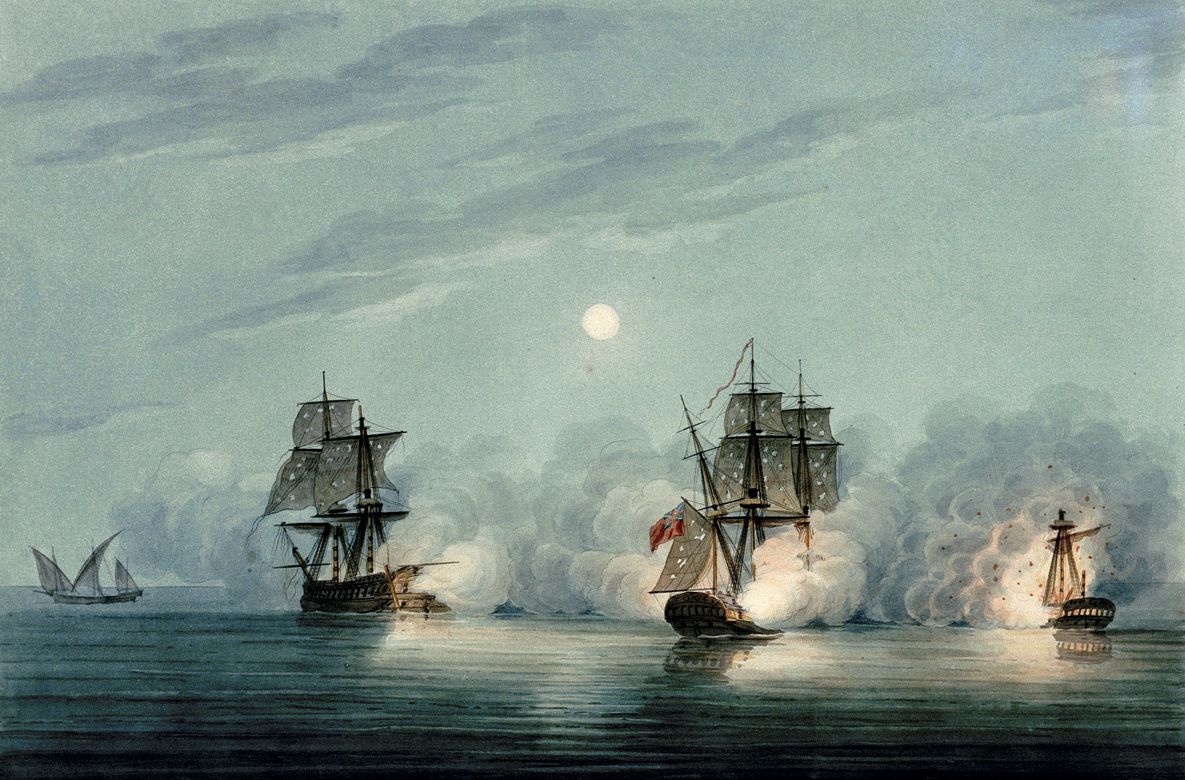
Seahorse engaging both Bedr-i Zafer and Alis Fezzan during the battle

Around 21:30, Seahorse closed in on Alis Fezzan from the port quarter, cutting off her wind and quickly overtaking her. A starboard broadside fired by Stewart caused an explosion aboard the sloop, and within fifteen minutes Alis Fezzan was left wrecked. Duragardi Ali turned away beneath Seahorse's stern and withdrew from the engagement. Stewart renewed the chase of Bedr-i Zafer, closing so quickly that at about 22:30 he ordered Seahorse's topgallant yards lowered and resumed the engagement. Both ships ran before the north-veering breeze and exchanged fire—Seahorse's starboard battery against Bedr-i Zafer's port guns—until Scandril again attempted to come alongside. As Bedr-i Zafer closed, Seahorse surged ahead and raked the Ottoman forecastle with grape from her stern chasers, inflicting casualties among the boarders assembled there.

Both ships were slightly damaged, and Bedr-i Zafer soon moved in close again. They continued fighting and exchanged heavy gunfire. During this, Bedr-i Zafer lost one of its masts. By almost midnight on 5 July, her guns were nearly silent. Stewart repeatedly called on the Ottoman ship to surrender, but received no answer, even after two more masts were shot down. Stewart then sailed behind the Ottoman ship and moved close along her left side to demand surrender again. Instead of replying, Scandril fired a few guns. In response, Seahorse immediately fired a full broadside. By this time it was after 1:00 a.m. on 6 July. Both ships stopped moving, facing west. Their crews were exhausted and fell asleep at their positions, although Seahorse fired an occasional shot to keep the Ottoman crew awake.

At daylight on 6 July, Bedr-i Zafer was observed making way, her shredded courses squared before the wind and her ensign still flying. Seahorse made sail in pursuit, ran across the Ottoman ship's stern and again raked her with a starboard broadside. Captain Scandril remained on his quarterdeck, refusing to surrender, but several of his officers and crew seized him and hauled down the Ottoman colours. Brought aboard Seahorse, Scandril resisted handing over his Damascus sword, but the British prize crew under Lieutenant Downie were already taking possession. Bedr-i Zafer was wrecked aloft, hulled and leaking.

== Aftermath ==
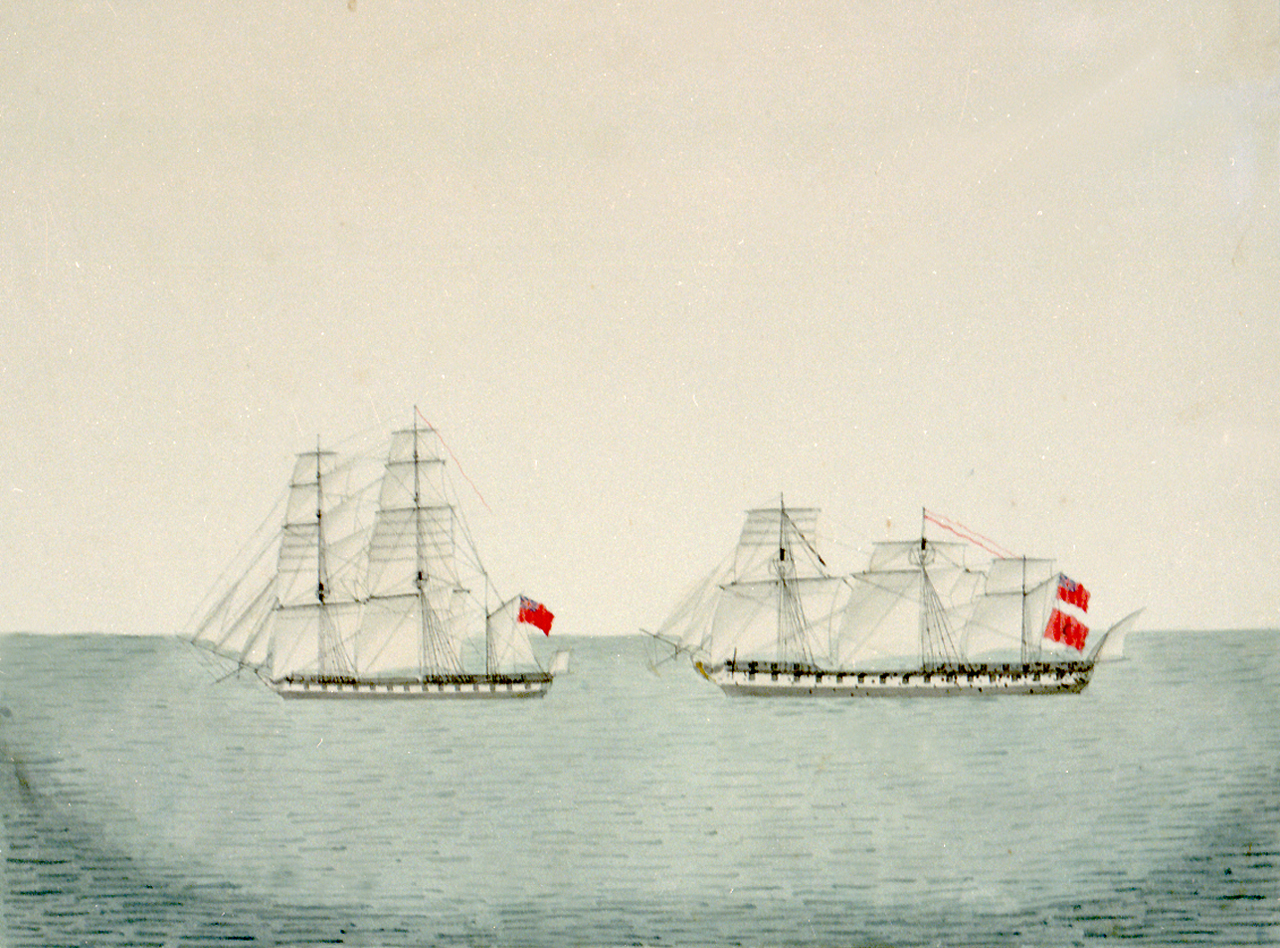
Seahorse towing Bedr-i Zafer to Malta after the battle

Out of a complement of 543 men, Bedr-i Zafer lost approximately 170 killed and 200 wounded, many of them mortally. The scale of the Turkish losses — together with their inability to inflict heavy damage on Seahorse — underscores the desperate nature of their resistance and suggests rudimentary gunnery; moreover, the two Ottoman ships did not coordinate their efforts, a failure that greatly simplified Seahorse's task Despite being under-manned, the British frigate benefited from greater sea experience, and Stewart's handling of Seahorse, particularly during the night action, proved effective. Seahorse sustained the loss of her mizzen topmast and had her sails badly damaged, but her crew of 251 men and boys suffered comparatively light casualties, with five killed and ten wounded.

Seahorse arrived at Mykonos with Bedr-i Zafer in tow. During the passage, Scandril, who had been returned to his captured ship, attempted to destroy her. At Mykonos it took three days to re-rig Bedr-i-Zafer and render her seaworthy. Stewart then sent the Ottoman crew back to Constantinople in Greek vessels and towed Bedr-i Zafer to Malta. There she was sold to Maltese merchants, who loaded her with Egyptian cotton and dispatched her to London. She subsequently made a voyage to Brazil and back before being broken up at Deptford. After the action, Seahorse conveyed a British plenipotentiary to Constantinople, where she passed Alis Fezzan in a dismantled condition. The diplomatic mission resulted in a peace treaty signed on 5 January 1809 with Mahmud II, the new sultan who had emerged victorious from the political struggles at the Topkapı Palace.
