= HMS Seahorse (1794) =

Frigate of the Royal Navy

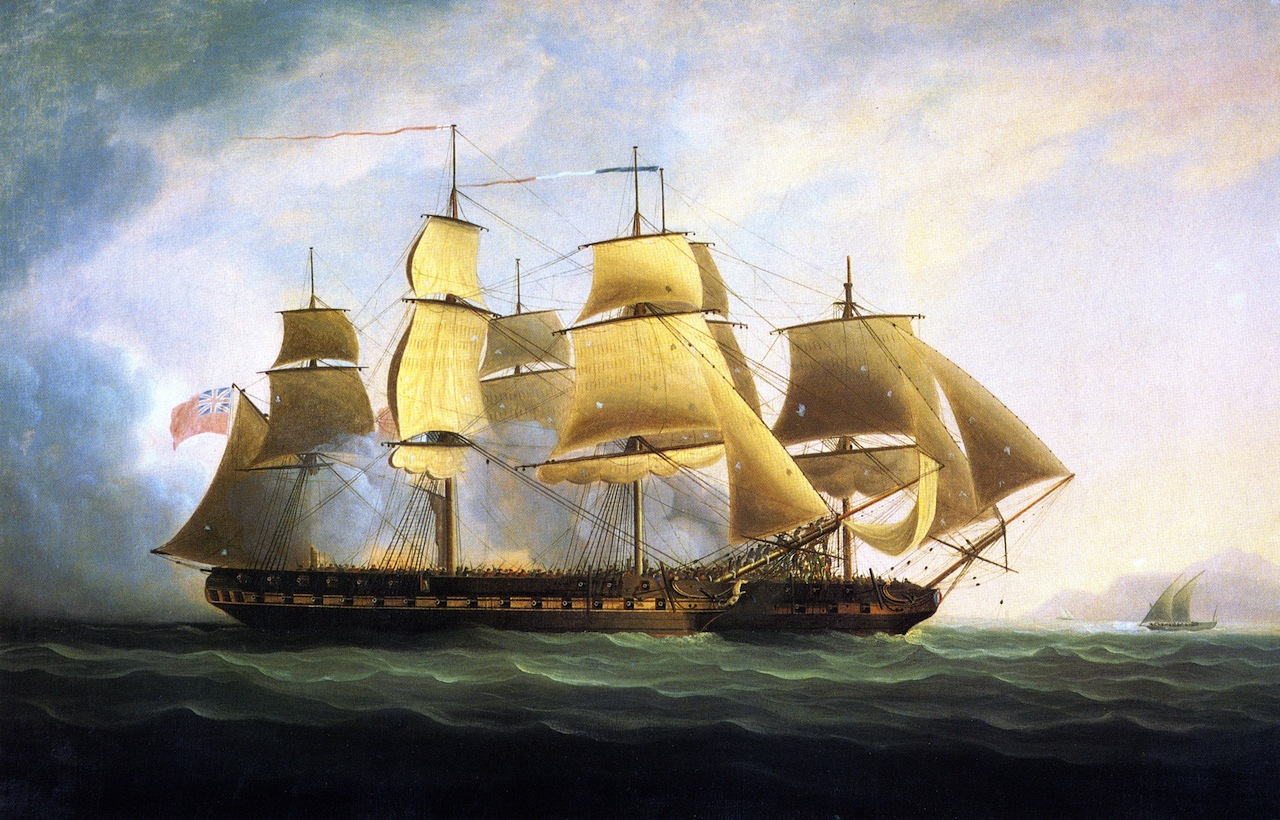
- Seahorse (left) at the action of 27 June 1798

History

Great Britain
- Name: HMS Seahorse
- Ordered: 14 February 1793
- Builder: Marmaduke Stalkartt, Rotherhithe
- Laid down: March 1793
- Launched: 11 June 1794
- Commissioned: 16 June 1794
- Honours and awards: Naval General Service Medal (NGSM) with clasps: "Seahorse with Badere Zaffere"; "The Potomac 17 August 1814"; "Boat Service 14 December 1814"
- Fate: Broken up in July 1819

General characteristics
- Type: 38-gun Artois-class fifth-rate frigate
- Tons burthen: 999 43/94 bm
- Length: 146 ft 3 in (44.6 m) (overall); 121 ft 8 1/2 in (37.1 m) (keel)
- Beam: 39 ft 3 1/2 in (12.0 m)
- Depth of hold: 13 ft 9 in (4.19 m)
- Sail plan: Full-rigged ship
- Complement: 270 (later 315)
- Armament: Upper deck: 28 × 18-pounder guns; QD: 2 × 9-pounder guns + 12 × 32-pounder carronades; Fc: 2 × 9-pounder guns + 2 × 32-pounder carronades

HMS Seahorse was a 38-gun Artois-class fifth-rate frigate of the Royal Navy. She was launched in 1794 and broken up in 1819.

== French Revolutionary Wars ==
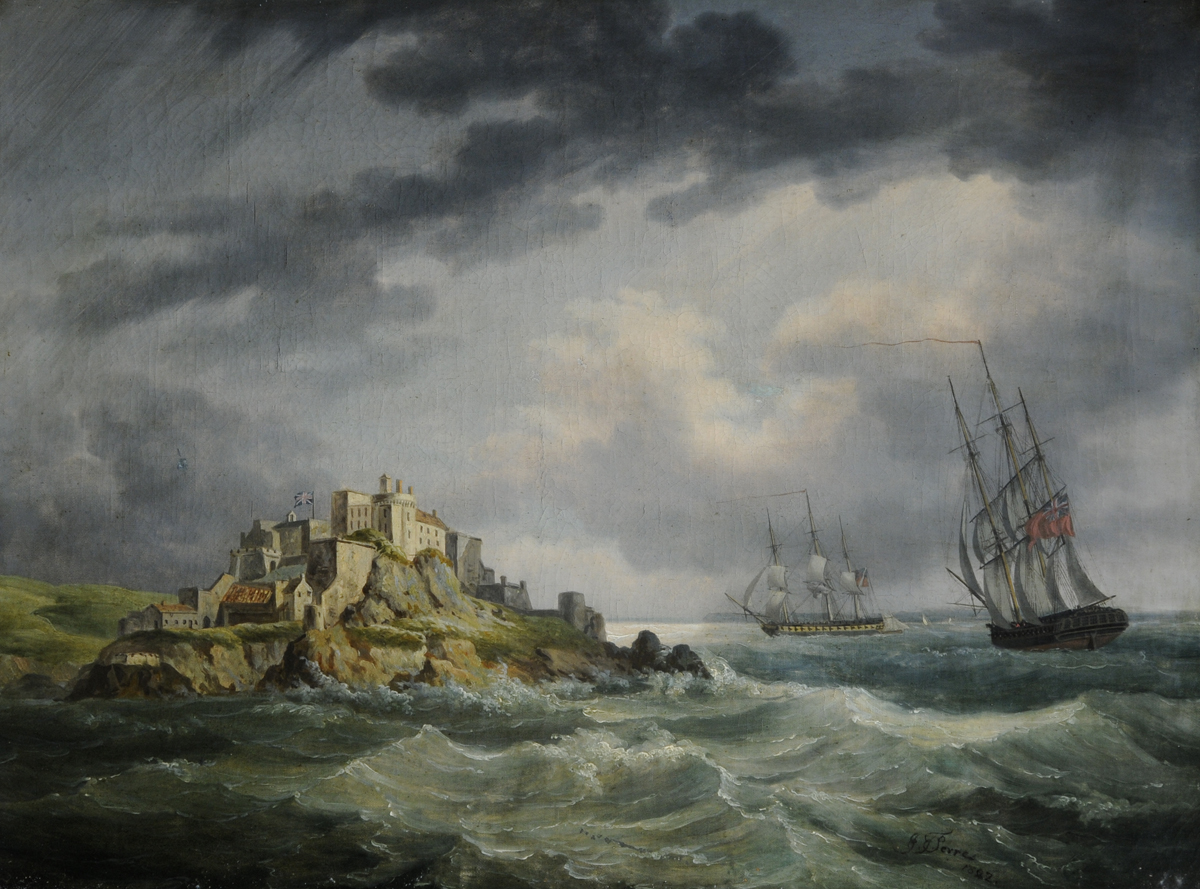
Seahorse and Cerberus off Mont Orgueil in 1796

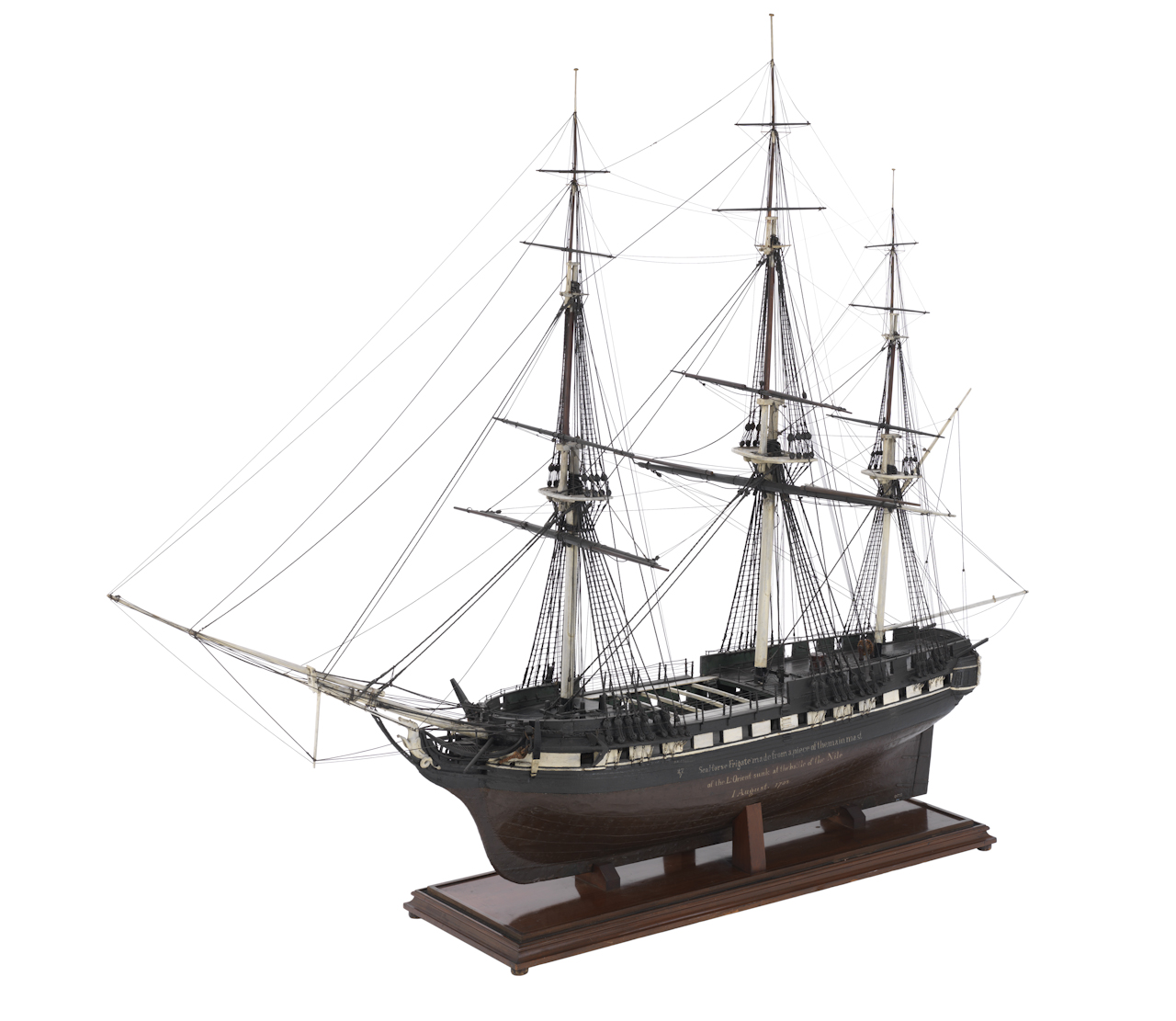
Model of Seahorse made from Orient's mainmast

Launched in June 1794, Seahorse was commissioned the following month by Captain John Peyton for the Irish Station. In July 1796, HMS Cerberus (1794) and Seahorse took the privateer cutter Calvados (or Salvados). Calvados carried six guns and ten swivels, and had a crew of 38 men. She was ten days out of Brest, France, but had not made any captures. Joined by Diana, Cerberus and Seahorse captured the 14-gun privateer Indemnité on 28 August. Indemnité, of Boulogne, was pierced for 14 guns but carried ten. She had a crew of 68 men. On 14 September, Cerberus, Seahorse and Diana captured the Brazilian ship Santa Cruz. Seahorse took part in Horatio Nelson's failed attack on Santa Cruz de Tenerife on 25 July 1797. She captured the French frigate Sensible in the action on 27 June 1798 in the Strait of Sicily.

She was with Vice-Admiral Hood's squadron off Alexandria in August 1798. On 2 September, while on patrol in the company of Zealous, Goliath, Swiftsure, Emerald, Alcmene, and Bonne Citoyenne, Seahorse assisted in the destruction of Anemone, a French aviso. Anemone had left Toulon on 27 July and Malta on 26 August. Emerald and Seahorse chased Anemone inshore where she anchored in the shallow water, out of reach of the two British frigates. When the frigates despatched boats, Anemone cut her anchor cable and drifted on to the shore. While the Frenchmen were attempting to escape along the coast, unfriendly Arabs captured them and stripped them of their clothes, shooting those who resisted. The commander and seven others escaped naked to the beach where the British, who had swum ashore with lines and wooden casks, rescued them. (Note: The Arabs captured some 17 to 20 survivors (accounts differ), and offered them to General Kléber, who ransomed them.) Anemone had a crew of 60 men under the command of enseigne de vaisseau Garibou, and was also carrying General Camin and Citoyen Valette, aide de camp to General Napoleon Buonaparte, with dispatches from Toulon, as well as some other passengers. Camin and Valette were among those the Arabs killed. (Note: Anemone was the tartane Cincinnatus, which the French Navy had commissioned in June 1794 as an aviso, and renamed in May 1795. Her armament consisted of two 6-pounder and two 4-pounder guns, and four swivel guns.)

Seahorse arrived at Portsmouth in October 1799, and returned to the Mediterranean in May 1800 as the flagship of Rear-admiral Sir Richard Bickerton. On the way, in the evening of 4 April, she encountered the merchantman Washington which was sailing from Lisbon to Philadelphia, and which cleared for action. Both parties were able to identify themselves in time. On 9 September 1801, Seahorse left Portsmouth, escorting a convoy bound for Bengal. The convoy, reached Madeira on 23 September, and left the next day. The convoy consisted of the East Indiamen Northampton, Manship, Sarah Christiana, Comet, General Stuart, Sovereign, Caledonia, Ann, Princess Mary, Varuna, Carron, Elizabeth, Monarch, and Friendship.

== Mediterranean ==
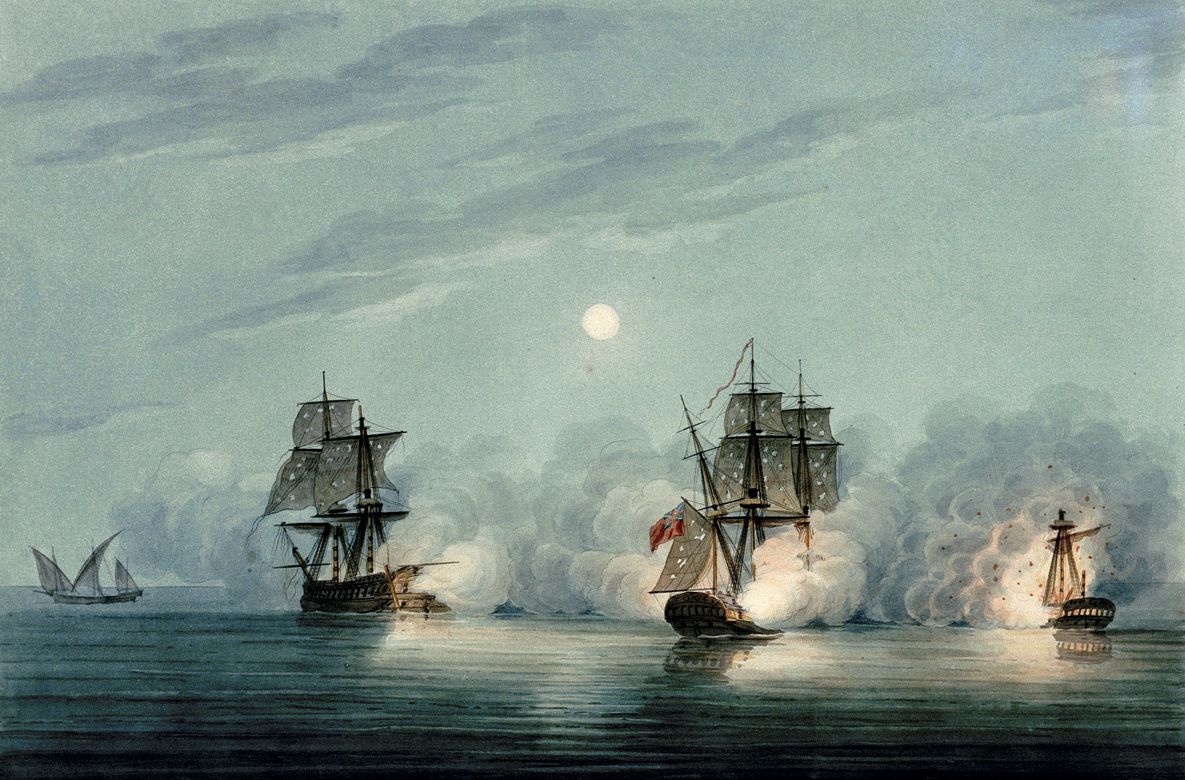
Seahorse (second from right) at the Battle of Skopelos

Seahorse was paid off on October 1802 and recommissioned in May 1803. She saw combat at Le Lavandou on 11 July 1804. Seahorse was at Malta on 1 November 1804 under Captain Boyle. On 6 July 1808, Seahorse under Captain John Stewart captured the Ottoman frigate Bedr-i Zafer at the Battle of Skopelos. Stewart was awarded a gold medal for the capture by George III, one of only 18 instances of such an award being given. In 1847 the British Admiralty authorized the issue of the NGSM with clasp "Seahorse with Badere Zaffere" to all the surviving claimants from the action. On 10 May 1809, a landing party from Seahorse and HMS Halcyon landed on French-held islands of Pianosa and Giannutri. The landing party destroyed several forts and captured about 100 prisoners during four hours of fighting. British losses were one marine killed and one wounded.

On 8 May 1810 Seahorse captured the 2-gun Neapolitan privateer Stella di Napoleon and her 40-man crew. On 22 August 1810, while cruising off Tuscany Seahorse encountered French brig Renard and Ligurie. Ligurie escaped immediately but Seahorse was able to drive Renard ashore and attack her there. Even so, Renard was little-damaged and was able to get off after Seahorse had left. Renard limped back to Genoa and e route met Seahorse again, but sought refuge under the shore batteries of Levanto which, although in bad shape, proved sufficient to deter Seahorse.

Seahorse was paid off for a second time in June 1811, and was under repair at Woolwich from August to October 1812. She was recommissioned in September 1812 under the command of Sir James Gordon. She sank the 16-gun privateer lugger Subtile off Beachy Head on 13 November 1813 after a chase of three hours. The lugger had been so damaged in the chase that she sank before Seahorse could take off her crew. As a result, of her crew of 72 men, all but 28 drowned, her captain, François-David Drosier, and all his officers, among them. She was a few days out of Dieppe and had captured a Swedish brig laden with salt, and a light collier. HMS Urgent was in sight at the time. On 24 March 1814 Seahorse recaptured the Swedish ship Maria Christina while in company with Pactolus and another warship. (Note: A first-class share of the prize money was worth £187 3s 3 3/4d; the prize money for an ordinary seaman was £2 2s 4 1/2d. For an ordinary seaman, this would have amounted to about six weeks' wages.)

== War of 1812 ==
Seahorse was off the Atlantic Coast of Northern America in 1814, taking part in an action off the Potomac on 17 August 1814. (John Robyns, Captain of the Royal Marine detachment of HMS Albion, reckoned Seahorse took £100,000 in prizes.) In September, she was present at the Battle of Baltimore. (Note: The warships present off Baltimore were Tonnant (80), Albion (74), Madagascar (74), Ramillies (74), Royal Oak (74), Severn (50), Diomede (50), Havannah (42), Weser (44), Brune (38), Melpomene (38), Seahorse (38), Surprise (38), Trave (38), Thames (32), Rover (18), & Wolverine (18). Also present were the troopships Diadem, Dictator & Regulus.)

Thereafter, Seahorse served off the Gulf Coast, and her captain commanded a squadron of vessels upon arriving on 31 October at Pensacola, Florida. (Note: The Honourable Captain Percy commanded the Squadron before my arrival (on the 31st Ultimo)) Seahorse was at Pensacola until the arrival of General Andrew Jackson's forces caused the British to depart in November.

Whilst accompanied by Alceste and Sophie passing Lake Borgne in the direction of the Chandeleur Islands, they were fired upon by two gunboats of the US Navy. Her boats were to participate in the Battle of Lake Borgne. Her officers and crew qualified for the clasps to the Naval General Service Medal that the Admiralty issued in 1847 to all surviving claimants, for the former and latter actions of 17 August 1814 and 14 December 1814 respectively. (Note: The 'Names of Ships for which Claims have been proved' are as follows: warships Tonnant, Norge, Royal Oak, Ramillies, Bedford, Armide, Cydnus, Trave, Seahorse, Sophie, and Meteor; troopships Gorgon, Diomede, Alceste, and Belle Poule.)

Seahorse stopped off at Apalachicola, Florida to embark 64 Royal Marines being withdrawn from Prospect Bluff, on the Apalachicola River. She departed on 15 April 1815, stopped at Havana, then A Coruña on 25 May 1815, and arrived at Portsmouth on 30 May 1815.

== Fate ==
Seahorse was broken up in July 1819.
