= Highland Chief (1798 ship) =

History

United Kingdom
- Name: Highland Chief
- Owner: 1798:Lennox & Co.; 1802:John Cleland
- Launched: 10 February 1798
- Fate: Captured 1802

General characteristics
- Tons burthen: 46264/94 or 463, or 500, or 550 (bm)
- Propulsion: Sail
- Armament: 8 × 6-pounder guns
- Notes: Three decks; teak-built

Highland Chief was launched at Calcutta in 1798. She made two voyages for the British East India Company (EIC) before a French privateer captured her in 1802, south of the Bay of Bengal.

== Career ==
EIC voyage #1 (1799): Captain Thomas Scott sailed from Bengal on 16 January 1799. Highland Chief reached St Helena on 10 April. She was part of a convoy of some 18 ships that left St Helena on 9 May under escort by HMS Raisonnable. Highland Chief arrived at the Downs on 13 July.

She was admitted to British Registry on 14 August 1799. Highland Chief appears in Lloyd's Register in 1799 with Scott, master. Lennox & Co., owner, and trade London—India. On 17 October Captain William Greenway (or Greenaway) sailed from Falmouth for Bengal. The 14-gun brig HMS Falcon was to escort the merchantmen.

EIC voyage #2 (1800–1801): Captain William Greenway left Bengal on 11 December 1800, bound for England. Highland Chief reached St Helena on 24 February 1801. She was part of a small convoy under escort by Buffalo that also included Minerva, Varuna, and Friendship.

In May during a fog off the Lizard a frigate ran into Highland Chief. Both vessels sustained substantial damage. Highland Chief arrived on 23 May at Plymouth "in distress". Then on 7 June the hired armed lugger Valiant escorted Highland Chief and a convoy to the River Thames. Highland Chief finally arrived in the Downs on 10 June, and Gravesend two days later.

== Capture ==
Highland Chief, Captain Greenaway, sailed from Gravesend on 23 September, bound for India. She sailed via Madeira and Rio de Janeiro, and arrived at the Cape of Good Hope on 16 December.

On 13 August 1802 Lloyd's List reported that a small privateer had captured Highland Chief as she was on her way to Bengal and that her captain had been killed when the privateers boarded her. The privateer sent Highland Chief into Île de France. Then on 26 December Lloyd's List reported that Porcher, Tay, and Highland Chief had been taken into Île de France and condemned there as prizes of war.

On 5 February 1802 Highland Chief encountered the French privateer Subtilite (or Subtile), of five guns and 116 men under the command of Captain Pineau at 2°12′S 93°36′E. (Note: A key French source states simply that Subtil was a privateer active in March 1802. Nothing more is known about her.) Subtile was flying American colours and seemed unarmed; Greenway thought that it might be the American brig Roebuck, which they had seen several times since leaving the Cape. As the vessel got close, the British realized that it was armed, much more heavily crewed than it had initially appeared to be, and was hostile. An engagement ensued of about half an hour. At the outset, Highland Chief's Portuguese and lascar crewmen fled below, leaving only 21 English crew to continue the fight. After the exchange of four or five broadsides Subtile came alongside and 95 Frenchmen came on board, capturing her.

Highland Chief had already struck when one of the Frenchmen in the rigging fired a Blunderbuss at Captain Greenway, who was standing on the poop deck, killing him. In addition to the loss of Captain Greenway, several crew had been wounded by cutlasses during the boarding. The French had lost eight men dead and 19 wounded.

Next day Subtile captured Roebuck, firing on her despite the fact that she was flying American colours and hence was a neutral vessel. The French plundered Roebuck, transferring both that plunder and Highland Chief's guns and some other items to Subtile. After about 30 hours Pineau dispatched Highland Chief to Mauritius. He put all his prisoners aboard Roebuck, put some extra water and provisions aboard her, and sent her on to India. She arrived at Vizagaptam around 5 March.

In June 1802, Earl Cornwallis sailed to Île de France having on board a number of French prisoners, who had been detained in Bengal. The prisoners were under the charge of Mr. Campbell, who the Bengal Government had also charged with negotiating with the Governor of Île de France for the release of Tay, Highland Chief, and Porcher. The vessels and their cargoes were estimated to be worth £100,000. That the preliminaries had been signed was known at the time of capture to both the captain of Porcher and the captain of Bellone, the privateer that had captured her and Tay. Even so, the French prize court upheld the seizures.

Porcher eventually returned to British ownership following a recapture. It is not currently clear what subsequently happened to Highland Chief or Tay. (Note: Reports exist that Highland Chief was under the command of Captain Scott, that it was he who was killed, that she was captured on 30 March, and that her captor was Bellone. None of these items is correct. The same source reports that this Highland Chief and a later one, also captured by the French, were later recaptured when the British captured Île de France (Mauritius) on 3 December 1810. It has not been possible to verify via online resources the accuracy of the claim of either Highland Chief being recaptured. No vessel named Highland Chief appears on a list of vessels captured at Port Napoleon.)
