= Marmaduke Stalkartt =

English shipwright

- Born: 1750
- Died: September 24, 1805 (aged 54–55); Calcultta
- Occupation: naval architect
- Notable work: Naval architecture
- Parents: Hugh Stalkartt (father); Mary Burchett (mother)

Marmaduke Stalkartt (1750 – 24 September 1805) was an English shipwright.

== Life ==
Marmaduke Stalkartt was the fourth child of Mary Burchett and Hugh Stalkartt. After presumably serving an apprenticeship at Deptford Dockyard, he was sent to India in 1796 to establish shipyards to build men-of-war in teak.

Stalkartt's Naval architecture (1781) was divided into seven books: 'Of Whole-Moulding'; 'Of the Yacht'; 'Of the Sloop'; 'Of the Forty-Four-Gun-Ship'; 'Of the Seventy-Four-Gun-Ship'; 'Of the Cutter, and Ending of the Lines'; and 'Of the Frigate'. It was reviewed appreciatively in The Critical Review and The Monthly Review.

A copy originally purchased by George, Prince of Wales in 1781 is held by the Royal Collections Trust, one the first books he led a subscription list for. A further copy, identically bound in a cover decorated with gold embossed nautical images, was owned by King George III, and is held by the British Library.

Stalkartt died on 24 September 1805 in Calcultta.

== Works ==
- Naval architecture, or, The rudiments and rules of ship building: exemplified in a series of draughts and plans: with observations sending to the further improvement of that important art, 1781. Google Books
