= Sagar Island =

Island in West Bengal, India

Geography
- Location: Bay of Bengal
- Archipelago: Sundarbans

Administration
- India
- State: West Bengal
- District: South 24 Parganas

Demographics
- Population: 212037

Sagar Island is an island in the Ganges delta, lying on the continental shelf of Bay of Bengal about 100 km (54 nautical miles) south of Kolkata. This island forms the Sagar CD Block in Kakdwip subdivision of South 24 Parganas district in the Indian State of West Bengal. It is the largest island in West Bengal. Although Sagar Island is a part of Sundarbans, it does not have any tiger habitation or mangrove forests or small river tributaries as is characteristic of the overall Sundarban delta. This island is a place of Hindu pilgrimage. Every year on the day of Makar Sankranti (14 January), hundreds of thousands of Hindus gather to take a holy dip at the confluence of river Ganges and Bay of Bengal and offer prayers (puja) in the Kapil Muni Temple. Kolkata Port Trust has a pilot station and a light house.

== Geography ==
Places in Kakdwip subdivision (Kakdwip, Sagar, Namkhana, Patharpratima CD blocks) in South 24 Parganas district
R: rural/ urban centre
Places linked with coastal activity are marked in blue
Owing to space constraints in the small map, the actual locations in a larger map may vary slightly

=== Location ===
Sagar Island is located at 21°39′10″N 88°04′31″E. It has an average elevation of 4 metres (13 ft).

=== Climate ===
Climate data for Sagar Island (1991–2020, extremes 1865–2010)
Month	Jan	Feb	Mar	Apr	May	Jun	Jul	Aug	Sep	Oct	Nov	Dec	Year
Record high °C (°F)	30.6 (87.1)	33.9 (93.0)	38.3 (100.9)	39.4 (102.9)	38.7 (101.7)	40.0 (104.0)	36.1 (97.0)	36.7 (98.1)	36.1 (97.0)	34.0 (93.2)	32.9 (91.2)	32.9 (91.2)	40.0 (104.0)
Mean daily maximum °C (°F)	25.0 (77.0)	27.4 (81.3)	30.3 (86.5)	31.9 (89.4)	32.8 (91.0)	31.8 (89.2)	31.0 (87.8)	31.0 (87.8)	31.2 (88.2)	31.1 (88.0)	29.3 (84.7)	26.6 (79.9)	29.9 (85.8)
Mean daily minimum °C (°F)	15.6 (60.1)	20.0 (68.0)	23.9 (75.0)	25.3 (77.5)	26.3 (79.3)	27.0 (80.6)	26.5 (79.7)	26.0 (78.8)	26.0 (78.8)	24.5 (76.1)	21.2 (70.2)	17.3 (63.1)	23.5 (74.3)
Record low °C (°F)	7.8 (46.0)	7.2 (45.0)	12.2 (54.0)	12.9 (55.2)	17.5 (63.5)	18.0 (64.4)	16.2 (61.2)	16.4 (61.5)	17.6 (63.7)	17.2 (63.0)	12.2 (54.0)	9.4 (48.9)	7.2 (45.0)
Average rainfall mm (inches)	13.6 (0.54)	17.5 (0.69)	25.0 (0.98)	36.8 (1.45)	156.0 (6.14)	259.5 (10.22)	353.0 (13.90)	321.7 (12.67)	291.9 (11.49)	226.2 (8.91)	41.4 (1.63)	5.8 (0.23)	1,748.3 (68.83)
Average rainy days	0.9	1.1	1.5	2.4	6.1	9.9	14.8	15.3	11.8	6.9	1.7	0.3	72.7
Average relative humidity (%) (at 17:30 IST)	71	75	76	80	81	83	85	85	83	79	73	69	78
Source: India Meteorological Department

== History ==
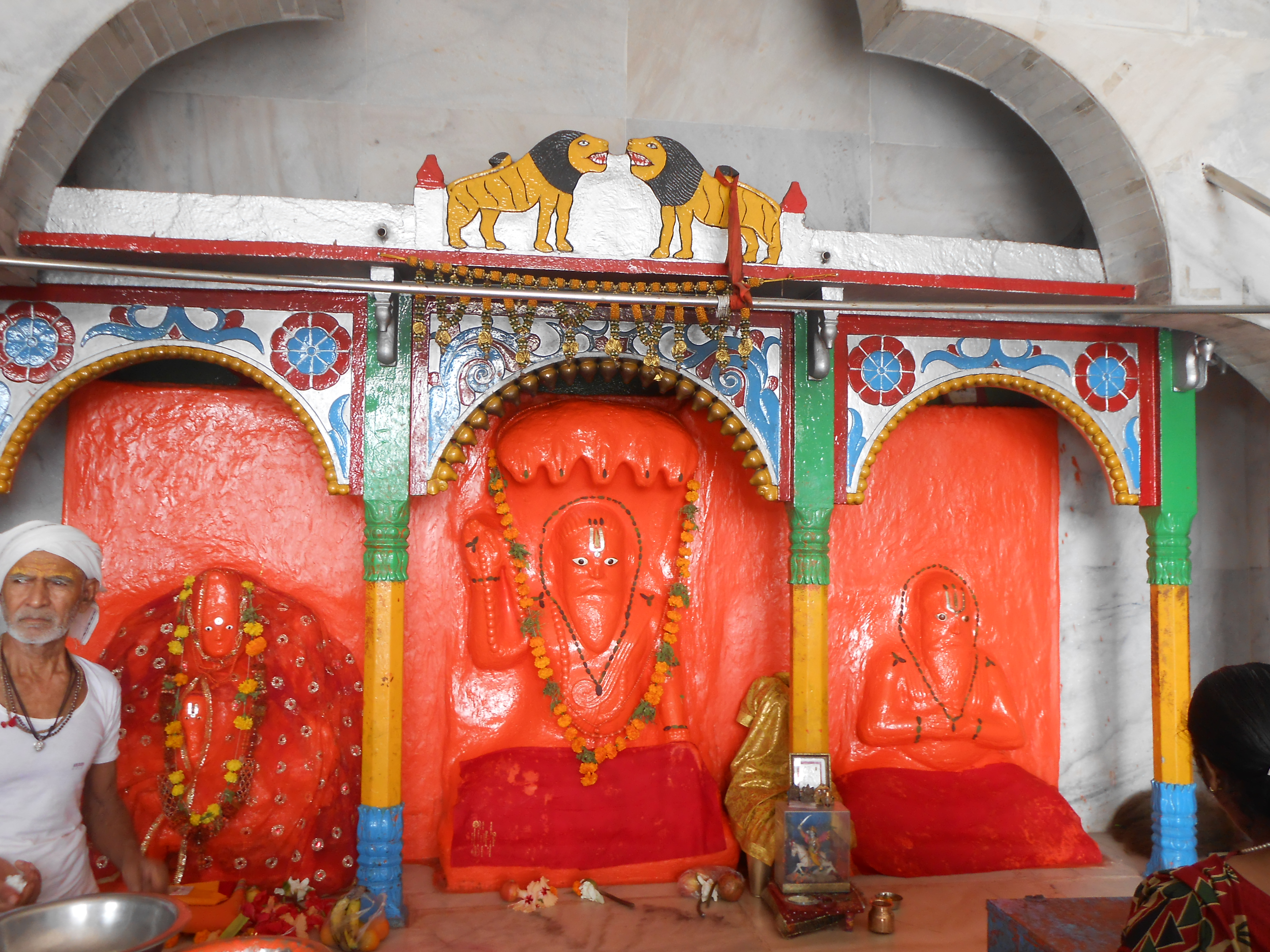
Kapil Muni Ashram at Gangasagar

A holy man, Kardam Muni, made a pact with Vishnu that he would undergo the rigours of marital life, on the condition that Vishnu would incarnate as his son. In due time Kapil Muni was born as an incarnation of Vishnu and became a great saint. Kapil Muni's ashram was located on the island. One day King Sagar's sacrificial horse disappeared; it had been stolen by Indra.

The king sent his 60,000 sons to find it, and they found it next to Kapil Muni's ashram, where Indra had hidden it. Mistaking Kapil Muni for the thief, the sons accused Kapil Muni, who in his wrath at the false accusation burned the sons to ash and sent their souls to Hell. Later having compassion for the King Sagar's sons, Kapil Muni acceded to the prayers of King Sagar's descendants, agreeing to the restoration of the sons, if Parvati in the form of the river goddess Ganga would descend to Earth to perform the Last Ritual (Hindus also called as"Tarpan") of mixing the ashes with holy water (niravapanjali).

Through deep meditation, King Bhagiratha induced Shiva to order Ganga down from heaven and the 60,000 sons were freed (moksha) and ascended to Heaven, but the river Ganges stayed on the Earth. The date of the descent of Ganga was the date, as is at present the 15th Day of January of the Gregorian Calendar which coincides with that of Makar Sankranti (when Surya enters Makar Constellation, i.e. "Uttarayan" of Hindu Panchangam).

Based on this mythology the then Zamindar, the Gayen family of Ganga Sagar Island or also called as Sagar Island (Sagar Dwip in Bangla) who moved in from north of South 24 Parganas donated huge lands to establish the Kapil Muni Ashram twice. But later they i.e. the Gayen family's majority members embraced Islam but remained close to Kapil Muni and Jagadhatri Puja as they were then the Zamindars during the British Rule.

== Demographics ==
As per 2011 Census of India, Sagar Island had a total population of 212,037, of which 109,468 (52%) were males and 102,569 (48%) were females. Population younger than six years was 26,212. The total number of literates was 156,476 (84.21% of the population over 6 years).

== Pilgrimage ==
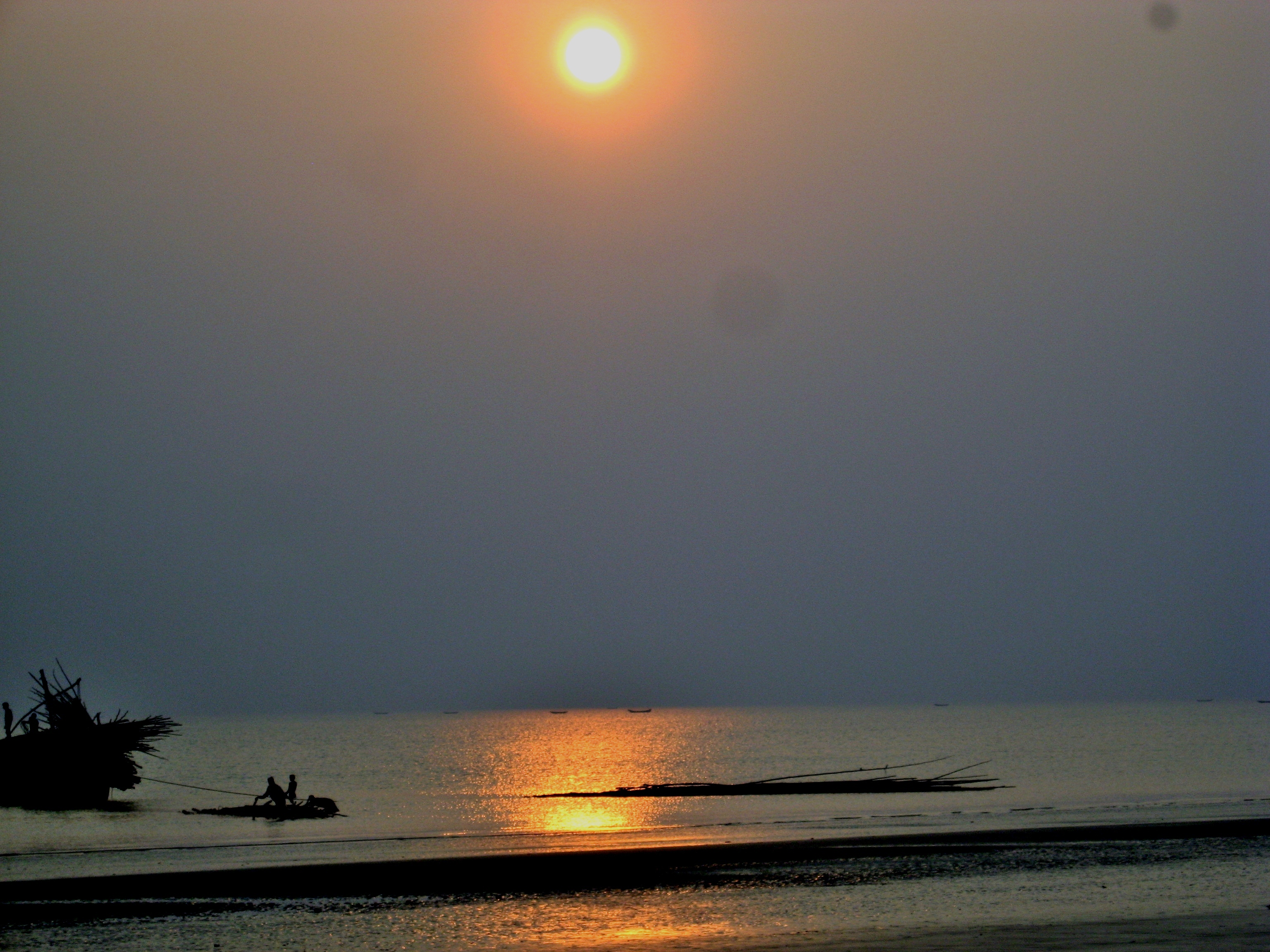
Sunset at Gangasagar.

The Gangasagar fair and pilgrimage is held annually on Sagar Island's southern tip, where the Ganges enters the Bay of Bengal. This confluence is also called Gangasagar or Gangasagara. Near the confluence is the Kapil Muni Temple. The Gangasagar pilgrimage and fair is the second largest congregation of mankind after the triennial ritual bathing of Kumbha Mela.

In 2007, about 300,000 pilgrims took the holy dip where the Hooghly meets the Bay of Bengal on the occasion of Makar Sankranti. Almost five-hundred thousand pilgrims thronged Sagar Island in 2008. For the rest of the year about 500,000 people come to the island. According to reports on 14 January 2018, 18-2 million people had visited Ganga Sagar in 2018, against 1.5 million in 2017.

== Travel ==
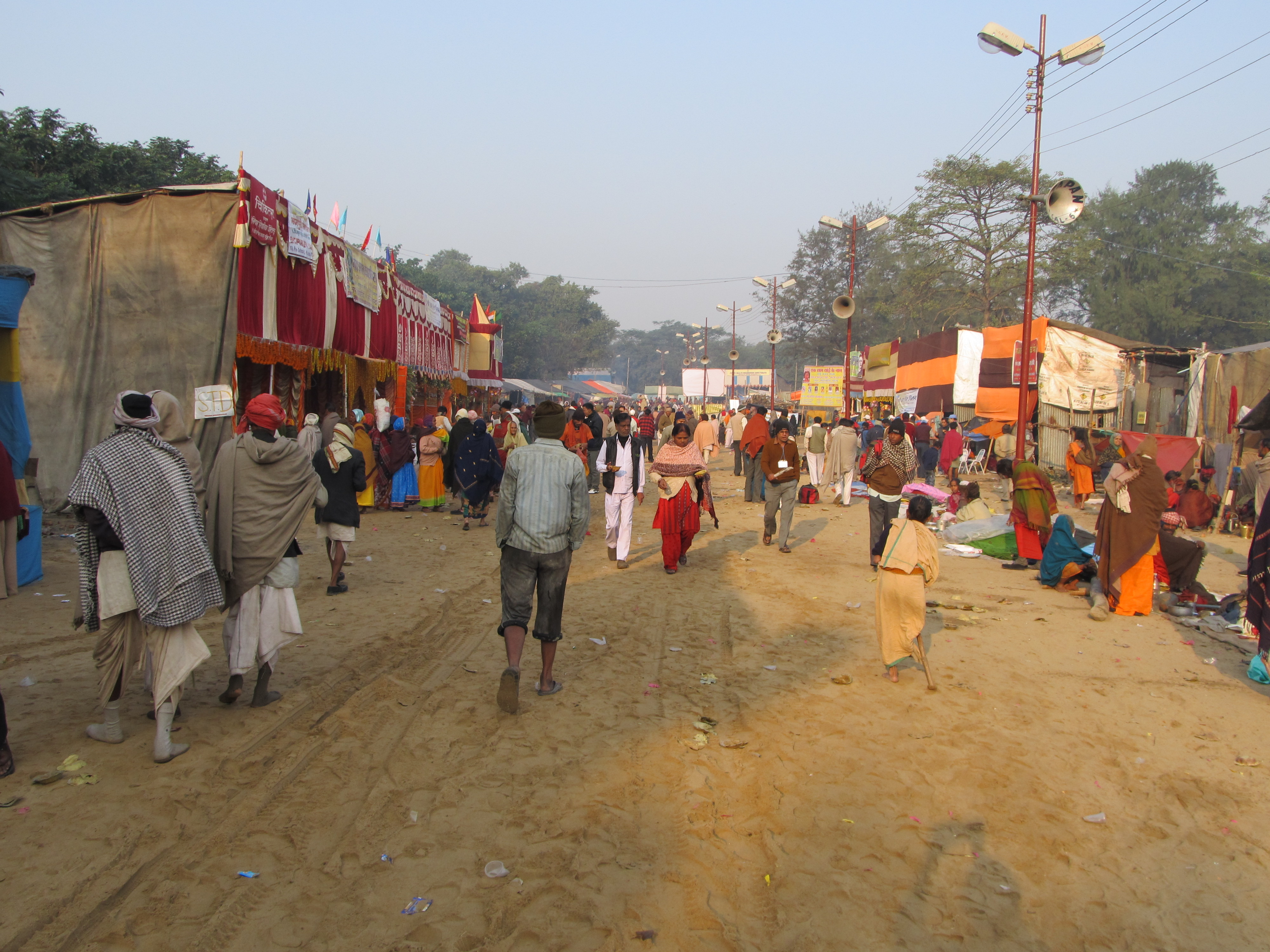
Gangasagar Fair Transit Camp, 2012

From Kolkata, Diamond Harbour Road (NH-12) runs south around 90 km (55 mi) to Harwood Point, near Kakdwip, where a ferry runs to Kachuberia at the north end of the island. The Panchyat Samity maintains a parking area near the ferry landing. The ferry travels about 3 1/2 km (2 1/4 mi) across a distributary of the Ganges river (also known as Hooghly River or Muriganga river locally) to reach Kachuberia. Small boats also cross from Harwood Point to Kachuberia. Private cars and buses travel the roughly 32 km (20 mi) to the pilgrimage site at Sagardwip. From the pilgrimage parking area the Kapil Muni Temple is about 200 metres (660 ft) and the Gangasagar confluence is about 700 metres (2,300 ft).

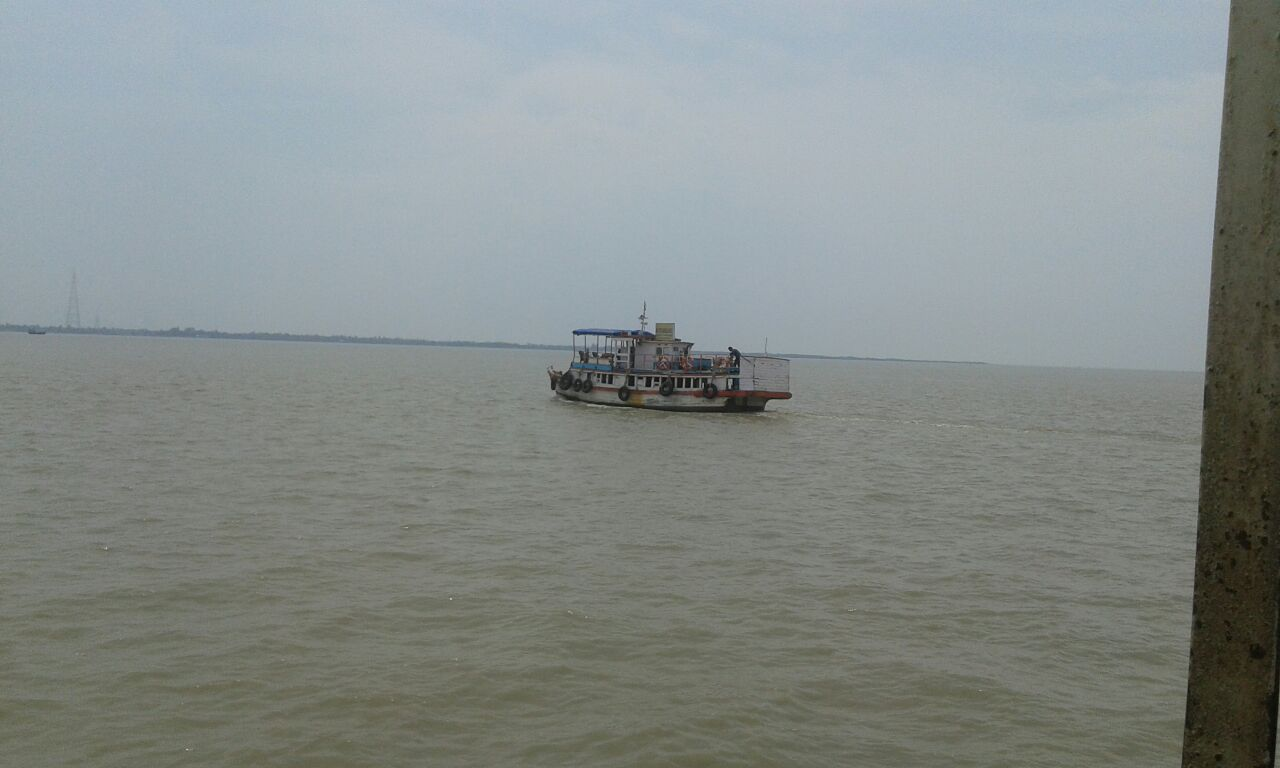
Ganga river launch service in Sagar Island

== Development proposals ==
The Government of India and Government of West Bengal are planning to connect Sagar Island with Kakdwip with a 3.3 km (2.1 mi) road-rail bridge and to build Sagar Port on Sagar Island.
