= Diadem (1800 ship) =

History

Great Britain
- Namesake: Diadem
- Owner: Edward, Aaron, and Robert Chapman
- Builder: Chapman and Campion, Whitby
- Launched: 1800
- Renamed: Diadem
- Fate: Last listed 1808
- Notes: Teak-built

General characteristics
- Tons burthen: 350, or 367 (bm)
- Propulsion: Sail
- Armament: 6 × 4-pounder guns

Diadem was a barque launched in 1800 at Whitby. She served as an armed defence ship between 1803 and 1805. Her owners sold her to the British government in 1818. The year 1818 may be a transcription error for 1808 as that is the last year for which Diadem is listed in either Lloyd's Register or the Register of Shipping.

Diadem enters the Register of Shipping in 1801 with J. Noddings, master, and trade Weymouth—Baltic. Although there was another Diadem at roughly the same time, she is the only one listed. Diadem appears in the Supplemental pages in Lloyd's Register with slightly different information: her master is J. Noddens, and her trade is that of a London-based transport.

Following the resumption of war with France in early 1803, concern developed in Britain about Napoleon's planned invasion of the United Kingdom. The British government's response took many forms including the reactivation of Fencible regiments and the Sea Fencibles, a program of the construction of Martello Towers along the coasts of Britain and Ireland, and the commissioning of a number of armed defense ships.

The British East India Company in November voted to underwrite 10,000 tons (bm) of armed transports to protect Great Britain's coasts. The vessels were existing, but not EIC, merchantmen that would receive an upgrade in armament and in some cases a naval officer as captain. The vessels were: Albion, Anacreon, Atlas, Aurora, Chapman, Diadem, Duckenfield, Helder, Indefatigable, Lord Forbes, Lord Nelson, Norfolk, Paragon, Perseus, Robert, Sir Alexander Mitchell, Suffolk, and Triton.

On 21 November 1803 Diadem, of 500 tons (bm) and 16 guns, was ready but yet to be allocated to her station. She was probably stationed in the Downs because she served in the Channel, cruising and escorting convoys. The Royal Navy returned the armed defense ships to their owners in the second half of 1805.

Diadem is last listed in 1808. The information on burthen, master, and owner is unchanged from the 1801 entries. The Register of Shipping too now showed her as a London-based transport.
