= Norfolk (1800 ship) =

History

France
- Launched: 1784
- Captured: c.1800

Great Britain
- Name: Norfolk
- Owner: Ebenezer Thompson, Rotherhithe, ship builder
- Acquired: 1800 by purchase of a prize
- Fate: Last listed in 1823

General characteristics
- Tons burthen: 500, or 600, or 620, or 640, or 642, or 650 (bm)
- Complement: 1800:40; 1801:130; 1814:52 (including 16 apprentices)
- Armament: 1800:22 × 32&9&6-pounder cannon; 1801:28 × 32&6-pounder cannon + 2 swivel guns; 1802:10 × 6-pounder guns + 8 × 32-pounder carronades

Norfolk was built in France in 1784, under a different name. The British captured her c. 1800, and she made some voyages as a West Indiaman. She also made a cruise as a privateer. Between 1803 and 1808, she served the Royal Navy as an armed defense and hired armed ship on the Leith Station. She spent her time escorting convoys in the North Sea and captured one French privateer. Between 1808 and 1814, after her naval service, Norfolk was a London-based transport. From 1814 to 1820, she made four voyages as a whaler in the British southern whale fishery. She was last listed in 1823.

== Career ==
Norfolk entered Lloyd's Register and the Register of Shipping in 1800. They described her as a French prize. Lloyd's Register gave her master's name as Goodall, and her owner as Thompson; the Register of Shipping did not have a name for her master, but also gave the name of her owner as Thompson. Lloyd's Register gave her trade as London–Suriname, and the Register of Shipping gave it as London–West Indies. She had had a thorough repair in 1799, or had been almost rebuilt in 1800.

On 20 May 1800, Captain Thomas Goodall acquired a letter of marque. He sailed Norfolk to Suriname and returned in November.

Goodall acquired a second letter of marque on 29 January 1801. This one showed Norfolk with a large complement, one more consistent with a privateer than a merchantman.

On 11 February, Norfolk, Goddall, master, sailed from Falmouth on a cruise. On 21 February, she sent into Falmouth Mercury, Pont_l__, master, which had been sailing from Teneriffe to Hamburg.

On 4 March, Maria, a Danish vessel carrying salt, came into Plymouth. She too had been detained by Norfolk, Goodall, master.

Lloyd's List reported on 3 July 1801, that Norfolk, Goodall, master, had arrived in Suriname from London, having engaged a Spanish frigate on the way. Norfolk arrived off Portsmouth in early September, having left Suriname on 11 July, Martinique on 23 July, and Montserrat on 28 July. She arrived at Gravesend on 5 September. Norfolk had damages repaired in 1801.

=== Armed defense and hired armed ship ===
Following the resumption of war with France in early 1803, concern developed in Britain about Napoleon's planned invasion of the United Kingdom. The British government's response took many forms including the reactivation of Fencible regiments and the Sea Fencibles, a program of the construction of Martello Towers along the coasts of Britain and Ireland, and the commissioning of a number of armed defense ships.

The British East India Company in November voted to underwrite 10,000 tons (bm) of armed transports to protect Great Britain's coasts. The vessels were existing, but not EIC, merchantmen that would receive an upgrade in armament and that would receive a naval officer as captain. One of the vessels was Norfolk; the others were Albion, Anacreon, Atlas, Aurora, Chapman, Diadem, Duckenfield, Helder, Indefatigable, Lord Forbes, Lord Nelson, Paragon, Perseus, Robert, Sir Alexander Mitchell, Suffolk, and Triton.

On 21 November 1803, Norfolk, of 600 tons (bm) and 18 guns (32 & 24-pounders), was listed as having been appointed to the Leith Station. On 4 July 1804 Lieutenant Sinclair sailed her to the Leith station. In 1805 Norfolk had damages repaired.

At 8am on 26 January 1807, six or seven miles off Flambro Head Norfolk, under Commander William Richan, sighted a lugger pursuing some merchant vessels. Norfolk gave chase and after almost four and a half hours succeeded in catching up with and capturing the French privateer Adolphe. Adolphe, under the command of Jacques Francis Leclerc, was armed with 14 guns and had a crew of 39 men. She had thrown two guns, 14 carriages, her boat and her ports overboard during the chase. She had sailed from the Dunkirk Roads on 21 January, and two days later near Dogger Bank had captured Leith Packet, Brooke, master, which was carrying a cargo of hemp from Tonningen to London. The packet's master, five crew members, and three passengers were aboard Adolphe. Norfolk took "Delpha" into Leith.

There is a story that Richan was also a smuggler and used Norfolk for smuggling forays. Mr. Robert Pringle, Collector of Excise, found a pretext on which to board and search Norfolk. When he did so he found that even her guns were loaded with tea and tobacco. The Excise then seized the ship. Richan was permitted to retire from the Navy.

On 23 May, Norfolk and several other armed ships and naval vessels, and their convoys, arrived at Elsinore from Orkney. Then on 27 May, she sailed from Elsinore for Orkney with a fleet.

On 14 July, Norfolk and a fleet arrived at Elsinore from Orkney. On 21 July, Norfolk sailed for Orkney.

Although the to-and-fro between Elsinore and Orkney probably represented convoy escort, the Royal Navy went on to participate in the Battle of Copenhagen (1807). Norfolk was not among the vessels listed as qualifying for prize money for the battle.

By 22 January 1808, Norfolk was back at Gravesend, having arrived from the North Sea.

=== Transport ===
After her service with the Royal Navy, Norfolk became a London-based transport.

In 1810, her master was A. Walton and her owner Thompson.

On 6 August 1811, she arrived at Portsmouth, having left St Thomas on 2 July, in a convoy of some 80 vessels under convoy by the frigate HMS Ganymede. Norfolk underwent a good repair in 1812.

Year	Master	Owner	Trade	Source & notes
1813	Thompson; W.Young	Thompson	London transport	LR; thorough repair 1812
1815	Young; H.Barton	Thompson	London transport	LR; thorough repair 1812

=== Whaler ===
1st whaling voyage (1814): Captain Holden Barton sailed from London in October 1814, bound for South Georgia. He returned with 500 casks (3500 barrels of elephant oil) and 5000 seal skins. The oil sold for £50 per tun and the skins for £2 per skin. Her owners were E. & Wm. Thompson.

2nd whaling voyage (1816): Captain Holden Barton sailed from London in May 1816, bound for South Georgia. The schooner Ann, of 150 tons (bm), accompanied Norfolk to act as a ship's tender. On the outward-bound leg, Norfolk was nearly lost off Brazil. At South Georgia a shallop was lost with at least three crewmen. Norfolk returned with 400 tuns of oil and 10,000 seal skins. (Sixty tuns of blubber were lost when a sloop foundered.) At the time of Norfolk's return her owner may have been bankrupt.

3rd whaling voyage (1817-1818): Captain Barton sailed on 23 June 1817. Norfolk returned on 22 May 1818. Norfolk underwent a good repair in 1818.

4th whaling voyage (1818-1820): Captain W. Smith sailed on 23 July 1818. She had left South Georgia on 1 December 1819, with about 160 tons of oil. Norfolk arrived at Gravesend on 8 March. She had lost her anchor and cables while at Deal.

== Fate ==
The Public Ledger and Daily Advertiser, for Friday 8 June 1821, contained an advertisement for the sale of "Norfolk, 650 tons, new wood sheathed and coppered for her last voyage as a South Sea Whaler".

LR last listed Norfolk in 1823.
