= Suffolk (ship) =

Several ships have been named Suffolk for the English county of Suffolk.

- Suffolk (1749 EIC ship) was an East Indiaman of the British East India Company (EIC), for whom she made four voyages before being broken up in 1761.
- Suffolk (1795 ship) was launched at Shields. She made one voyage for the EIC in 1800–1802. Thereafter she traded widely until she was broken up in December 1844.
- Suffolk (1800 ship) was launched in 1800. She made one voyage for the EIC in 1800–1802. She grounded in 1802 but was refloated. She then made a voyage to the Cape of Good Hope. On her return she became a West Indiaman. A Spanish privateer captured her in 1805.
- Suffolk (1803 ship) was launched in 1803 at Calcutta and at some point prior to 1810 was renamed General Wellesley. She made one voyage for the EIC but an American privateer captured her in December 1814 on the outbound leg of her second EIC voyage. In January 1815 she stranded on the Charleston Bar and became a total loss.
- PS Suffolk, a paddle steamer launched in 1895
- SS Suffolk (1899) was launched in 1899 for Federal Steam, and sank in 1900

== See also ==
- HMS Suffolk: six successive ships of the British Royal Navy
