= Suffolk (disambiguation) =

Suffolk is a county in England.

Suffolk may also refer to:

== Animals ==
- Suffolk sheep, black-faced, open-faced breed of domestic sheep
- Suffolk Punch, one of England's oldest breeds of draft horse

== Places ==
=== Canada ===
- Suffolk Township, now Saint-Émile-de-Suffolk, Quebec

=== United Kingdom ===
- Suffolk, Belfast, in Andersonstown, Northern Ireland
- Suffolk (European Parliament constituency)
- Suffolk (UK Parliament constituency)
- East Suffolk (disambiguation)
- Mid Suffolk, a local government district
- Suffolk Coastal, a former local government district
- West Suffolk (disambiguation)

=== United States ===
- Suffolk, Mississippi, in Franklin County, Mississippi
- Suffolk, Montana, in Fergus County, Montana
- Suffolk, Virginia, an independent city in eastern Virginia
- Suffolk County, Massachusetts
- Suffolk County, New York

== Ships ==
- Suffolk (ship), several ships
- HMS Suffolk, one of five ships, so named, of the British Royal Navy
- USS Suffolk (AKA-69), an attack cargo ship of the United States Navy

== Other uses ==
- Earl of Suffolk, a title that has been created four times in the Peerage of England
- Duke of Suffolk, a title that has been created three times in the Peerage of England
- Suffolk Downs, a thoroughbred race track in East Boston, Massachusetts
- Suffolk F.C., a football club in Northern Ireland, United Kingdom
- Suffolk University, a college in Boston, MA

== See also ==
- New Suffolk, New York
- Suffolk House (disambiguation)
