= Royal George (ship) =

Several ships been named Royal George after various members of the House of Hanover.

- Royal George (1794 ship) was launched at Newcastle and made at least one voyage (in 1821) as a Greenland whaler.
- Royal George (1798 ship) was a French prize that made one voyage as a slave ship and then traded until a French privateer captured her in 1805.
- Royal George (1803 ship) was launched at Cowes for the Revenue Service. The Royal Navy purchased her in 1806, renamed her HMS Bustard, and sold her in 1815. She made three voyages as a whaler between 1816 and her loss in 1825 while on her fourth voyage.
- Royal George was a merchant vessel that the Royal Navy purchased and renamed HMS Speedwell (1815)
- Royal George (1820 ship) was a merchantman launched in 1820. The EIC chartered her for a voyage in 1823–24, and later she made two voyages transporting convicts to Australia. She had numerous owners before she was sold in 1860 as a hulk or to be broken up.
- Royal George (1821 ship) was launched at Whitby and made several voyages under license from the British East India Company (EIC).

== See also ==
- HMS Royal George, one of eight ships by that name that served the British Royal Navy
- Royal George (East Indiaman), one of five ships sailing under long-term contracts to the EIC
