= Royal George =

Royal George may refer to:

== Ships ==
- Royal George (East Indiaman), various ships of the British East India Company
- Royal George (locomotive), an early steam locomotive
- HMS Royal George, various ships of the Royal Navy

== Australia ==
- Royal George, Tasmania, a village
- Royal George Hotel, Albany, Western Australia
- Royal George Hotel, Sydney, New South Wales
- Royal George Hotel and Ruddle's Building, Brisbane, Queensland

== United Kingdom ==
- Royal George, Eversholt Street, an historic pub on Eversholt Street in London, England
- The Royal George, historic pub in Staithes in North Yorkshire, England
- Royal George Hotel, Perth, Scotland
- Royal George Hotel, Monmouth, Monmouthshire, Wales
- Royal George Hotel, Tintern, Monmouthshire, Wales

== See also ==
- Royal George Hotel (disambiguation)
- George Royal, a racehorse
- George C. Royal (1921–2016), American microbiologist
