= Paragon (1800 Whitby ship) =

History

Great Britain
- Name: Paragon
- Owner: 1800:J. Woodcock & Co.; 1817:Read & Co.
- Builder: Fishburn and Brodrick, Whitby
- Launched: 30 January 1800
- Fate: Wrecked March 1819

General characteristics
- Tons burthen: 391, (Note: Weatherill reports that Paragon, of 391 tons (bm), was launched at Whitby, but has no other information other than she was still registered there in 1817.) or 394, or 39416/94 (bm)
- Armament: 1801:6 × 4-pounder guns; 1815:8 × 18-pounder carronades

Paragon was launched at Whitby in 1800. Between 1803 and 1805, she served as an armed defence ship protecting Britain's coasts and convoys. She then served as a transport on the 1805 naval expedition to capture the Cape of Good Hope. Next, she returned to mercantile service and in 1814, a French privateer captured her, but the British Royal Navy recaptured her the next day. She sailed to India in 1818, under a license from the British East India Company (EIC), and was wrecked in March 1819, while inbound to Calcutta.

== Career ==
Paragon first appeared in the registers with an entry in the 1800 Register of Shipping. Her master and owner was Woodcock, and her trade Whitby coaster. Her subsequent trades were Newcastle–Baltic (1801), and London–Hamburg (1801–1802).

Following the resumption of war with France in early 1803, concern developed in Britain about Napoleon's planned invasion of the United Kingdom. The British government's response took many forms including the reactivation of Fencible regiments and the Sea Fencibles, a programme of the construction of Martello Towers along the coasts of Britain and Ireland, and the commissioning of a number of armed defence ships.

The British East India Company in November voted to underwrite 10,000 tons (bm) of armed transports to protect Great Britain's coasts. The vessels were existing, but not EIC, merchantmen that would receive an upgrade in armament and in some cases a naval officer as captain. The vessels were: Albion, Anacreon, Atlas, Aurora, Chapman, Diadem, Duckenfield, Helder, Indefatigable, Lord Forbes, Lord Nelson, Norfolk, Paragon, Perseus, Robert, Sir Alexander Mitchell, Suffolk, and Triton.

On 21 November 1803, Paragon, of 400 tons (bm) and 16 guns, was ready but yet to be allocated to her station. Paragon was reported at various times at the Humber and Hull. On 29 January 1805, "the Paragon armed ship" was at Deal. One of her boats overturned near Sandown Castle while coming to shore. Soldiers from the castle were able to save all but one man. The Royal Navy returned the armed defence ships to their owners in the second half of 1805.

In autumn 1805, a small naval squadron under the orders of Commodore Sir Home Popham escorted a fleet of transports, including Paragon, and East Indiamen carrying some 5,000 soldiers under the command of Major-general Sir David Baird to attack the Dutch at the Cape of Good Hope. The fleet assembled at Madeira and touched at St. Salvador to replenish supplies. The expedition sailed again on the 26 November, and on 4 January 1806, in the evening, anchored to the west of Robben Island, preparatory to taking the Dutch colony.

After the invasion, on 7 February, Paragon sailed for Algoa Bay with troops to load lumber for military works.

Paragon disappeared from the registers between 1811 and 1814, and may have served as a government transport. She reappeared in the 1815 Register of Shipping (published in 1814), having undergone repairs. Her master was R. Miller and her owner Woodcock.

On 22 May 1814, the French privateer Hirondelle captured Paragon, Woodcock, master, near Wight as Paragon was sailing from Malta to Hull. The next day HMS Naiad recaptured Paragon, and sent her into Portsmouth.

The Register of Shipping for 1818, showed Paragon with R. Miller, master, changing to J. Keene, Woodcock & Co., owners, changing to Read & Co., and trade London–Île de France.

A list of ships sailing under license from the EIC showed Paragon, G.B. Keane, master, Read & Co. owners, sailing from England on 31 August 1818, bound for Bencoolen.

== Loss ==
Paragon was wrecked on 24 March 1819, when she was driven ashore at Saugor Sands, while on a voyage from London to the Cape of Good Hope and Calcutta. One crew member drowned, but the pilot vessel Sophia rescued all other crew and passengers. Captain Keene, who had been ill for some time, nevertheless died the next day. A later report stated that Paragon, Keene, master, had run aground on the night of the 24th and subsequently sunk; no property had been saved.
