= Roxburgh Castle (1809 ship) =

History

Spain
- Launched: 1803
- Captured: 1809

United Kingdom
- Name: Roxburgh Castle
- Namesake: Roxburgh Castle
- Owner: 1809:J. Pirie; 1813:G. Faith
- Acquired: 1809 by purchase of a prize
- Fate: Wrecked 1814

General characteristics
- Tons burthen: 377, or 37784/94, or 378 (bm)
- Complement: 25
- Armament: 1810:20 × 9-pounder carronades; 1810:2 × 6-pounder guns + 14 × 18&9&6-pounder carronades; 1814:2 × 6-pounder guns + 14 × 9-pounder carronades

The Roxburgh Castle launched in Spain in 1803 under an unknown name. She was taken as a prize in 1809, and then sailed under the flag of the United Kingdom. She was wrecked in 1814.

== Career ==
Roxburg Castle entered the Register of Shipping in 1810 with J. Bevans, master, J. Pirie, owner, and trade London–Trinidad. Captain John Bevanu acquired a letter of marque on 5 February 1810.

Under Pirie's ownership Roxburgh Castle also sailed to Pernambuco and The Brazils.

Lloyd's List reported on 8 January 1813 that Roxburgh Castle had grounded two days earlier at Gravesend as she was returning from Trinidad. She was gotten off without damage.

In 1813 the British East India Company (EIC) lost its monopoly on the trade between India and Britain. British ships were then free to sail to India or the Indian Ocean under a license from the EIC.

The Register of Shipping for 1814 showed Roxburgh Castle with T. Hunt, master, G. Faith, owner, and trade London–Île de France (Mauritius).

Roxburgh Castle sailed from England on 26 August 1813. She was in a convoy with General Hewett, Wanstead, and Windham, which were transporting convicts to New South Wales. Roxburgh Castle was carrying military equipment to the Cape of Good Hope. Chapman was transporting an army detachment to the Cape and Île de France (Mauritius). HMS Akbar provided an escort, at least for the early part of the voyage.

After she had delivered her supplies to the Cape, she sailed into the Indian Ocean. Roxburgh Castle was totally wrecked on 31 January 1814 on the coral banks off the coast of Mauritius.
