= Minstrel (disambiguation) =

A minstrel was a medieval European entertainer.

Minstrel(s) may also refer to:

- A performer in minstrel shows, comedic skits with black face
- Minstrel (1811 ship)
- Galaxy Minstrels, a type of chocolate candy
- The Minstrel, a Thoroughbred racehorse
- The 12th Prelude, Minstrels by Claude Debussy
