= Anacreon (1800 ship) =

History

Great Britain
- Name: Anacreon
- Namesake: Anacreon
- Builder: Sunderland
- Launched: 1800
- Fate: Transferred to Royal Navy 1803

United Kingdom
- Name: HMS Anacreon
- Acquired: 1803
- Fate: Returned to owner 1805

United Kingdom
- Name: Anacreon
- Acquired: Returned to owners 1805
- Fate: Wrecked October 1823

General characteristics
- Tons burthen: 440-443 (bm)
- Armament: 1800:4 × 9-pounder guns; 1806:16 × 6-pounder guns; 1810:8 × 6-pounder guns

Anacreon was launched in 1800 at Sunderland. She initially sailed between London and Minorca and then between 1804 and 1805 she served as an armed defense ship for the Royal Navy. She next became a London-based transport, and eventually traded from Liverpool to the Baltic and Canada. She was wrecked in 1823.

== Career ==
Anacreon entered Lloyd's Register in 1800 with Massingale, master, Davidson, owner, and trade London–Minorca. This information continued unchanged until 1805 in the Register of Shipping and 1806 in Lloyd's Register. However, the information in the registers was only as accurate as owners chose to keep it and both registers often carried stale data for some years. For Anacreon, the data was incorrect from late 1803 to late 1805.

Following the resumption of war with France in early 1803, concern developed in Britain about Napoleon's planned invasion of the United Kingdom. The British government's response took many forms including the reactivation of Fencible regiments and the Sea Fencibles, a program of the construction of Martello Towers along the coasts of Britain and Ireland, and the commissioning of a number of armed defense ships.

The British East India Company in November voted to underwrite 10,000 tons (bm) of armed transports to protect Great Britain's coasts. The vessels were existing, but not EIC, merchantmen that would receive an upgrade in armament and in some cases a naval officer as captain. The vessels were: Albion, Anacreon, Atlas, Aurora, Chapman, Diadem, Duckenfield, Helder, Indefatigable, Lord Forbes, Lord Nelson, Norfolk, Paragon, Perseus, Robert, Sir Alexander Mitchell, Suffolk, and Triton.

On 21 November 1803 Anacreon, of 443 tons (bm) and 16 guns, was ready but yet to be allocated to her station. On 28 December at Deal a boat from Anacreon capsized will coming to shore; two men drowned and a third died later.

In August 1804 she was at Sheerness undergoing fitting. Commander James John Charles Agassiz was appointed to her circa 6 September 1804. He commissioned her and by later that month she was on the Leith Station.

On 31 December 1805 the armed ships Helder, Anacreon, Triton, and Paragon were at Portsmouth, having come down from The Downs.

The Royal Navy returned the armed defense ships to their owners in the second half of 1805. Anacreon was deleted from the lists in July 1805. Commander Agassiz moved to take command on 22 January 1806 of HMS Rattler.

The 1806 volume of the Register of Shipping showed Anacreon's master as W. Young, her owner as Davison, and her trade as London transport.

Next, Anacreon was one of the transport vessels that were part of the expedition under General Sir David Baird and Admiral Sir Home Riggs Popham that would in 1806 capture the Dutch Cape Colony.

On 21 March 1806 she sailed with 16 other transports in a convoy to Great Britain with invalids and Dutch prisoners. The newly-captured and commissioned HMS Volontaire provided their escort.

The information in the table below comes from either Lloyd's Register (LR) or the Register of Shipping (RS).

Year	Master	Owner	Trade	Source and notes
1810	W. Young	Davison & Co.	London transport	RS; Good repair in 1809
1815	W. Young	Davison & Co.	London transport	RS; Good repair in 1809
1820	W. Rodgers	Nicholson	Liverpool–Riga; Liverpool–New Brunswick	LR; Good repair 1817
1824	T. Blackett	Captain	Liverpool to Miramichi, New Brunswick	LR; Damages repaired 1823

== Loss ==
Anacreon was lost on 9 October 1823 in the Magdalen Islands while on a voyage from Liverpool to Miramichi. Her crew were rescued.
