= Atlas (1801 South Shields ship) =

Boat launched in 1801

History

United Kingdom
- Name: Atlas
- Owner: Simon Temple, South Shields (for own account); 1803:G. Clay; 1818: Hills & Co.; 1820:Bullcott
- Builder: Temple shipbuilders, South Shields
- Launched: 18 June 1801
- Fate: Wrecked 9 May 1820

General characteristics
- Tons burthen: 435, or 43549/94, or 437, or 444 (bm)
- Propulsion: Sail
- Complement: 34
- Armament: 1801: 12 × 6-pounder guns; 1804:16 guns; 1815: 8 × 6-pounder guns + 2 × 6-pounder carronades

Atlas was built in Souths Shields by Temple and launched in 1801 for Temple. She made two voyages transporting convicts from Ireland or England to Port Jackson. On the first voyage she carried cargo for the British East India Company (EIC). On the second she sailed to Bengal after delivering her convicts to New South Wales and was wrecked off India in 1820 while on her way back to Britain.

== Career ==
Lloyd's Register for 1802 gives the name of her master as G. Pilmore. However, Richard Brooks received a letter of marque already on 17 August 1801.

=== First convict and EIC voyage (1801–1803) ===
Under Brooks's command, between 1801 and 1803 Atlas sailed for the East India Company on a voyage that first had her carrying convicts from Ireland to Port Jackson, and then going on to China, before returning to England.

Atlas left Deptford on 16 July 1801, and Blackwall on 20 August. She reached Waterford on 19 September and Cork four days later.

She sailed from Ireland on 29 November 1801. She arrived at Rio de Janeiro on 2 February 1802, and also stopped at the Cape. Atlas arrived at Port Jackson on 7 July 1802.

Atlas embarked 151 male and 63 female convicts. Twenty-eight male and two female convicts died on the voyage; others died just after disembarkation. Governor Philip Gidley King censured Brooks for this high death rate, which was the result of his negligence and the overcrowding that his transport of his personal cargo caused. Thomas Jamison, Atlas's surgeon, charged Brooks with assault in a civil action, and the transport commissioners threatened to prosecute him, but Brooks escaped punishment.

Atlas left Port Jackson on 7 October 1802 bound for China. She reached Whampoa on 14 December. By 18 April 1803 she was at St Helena, and on 18 June she finally reached Deptford.

=== Armed ship ===
Following the resumption of war with France in early 1803, concern developed in Britain about Napoleon's planned invasion of the United Kingdom. The British government's response took many forms including the reactivation of Fencible regiments and the Sea Fencibles, a program of the construction of Martello Towers along the coasts of Britain and Ireland, and the commissioning of a number of armed defense ships.

The British East India Company in November voted to underwrite 10,000 tons (bm) of armed transports to protect Great Britain's coasts. The vessels were existing, but not EIC, merchantmen that would receive an upgrade in armament and that would receive a naval officer as captain. The vessels were: Albion, Anacreon, Atlas, Aurora, Chapman, Diadem, Duckenfield, Helder, Indefatigable, Lord Forbes, Lord Nelson, Norfolk, Paragon, Perseus, Robert, Sir Alexander Mitchell, Suffolk, and Triton.

On 21 November 1803 Atlas, of 435 tons (bm) and 16 guns, was ready but had not yet been appointed to a station. On 29 August 1804 the armed ship Atlas and HMS Orestes departed the Downs for off Boulogne.

=== Transport ===
Around late 1804 or in 1805 the Navy returned the armed defense ships to their owners. In the fall of 1805 a small naval squadron under the orders of Commodore Sir Home Popham escorted a fleet of transports, including Atlas, and East Indiamen carrying some 5000 soldiers under the command of Major-general Sir David Baird to attack the Dutch at the Cape of Good Hope. The fleet assembled at Madeira and touched at St. Salvador to replenish supplies. The expedition sailed again on the 26 November, and on 4 January 1806, in the evening, anchored to the west of Robben Island, preparatory to taking the Dutch colony.

After the invasion, on 13 March Atlas sailed as a cartel with the crews of Atalanta and Napoleon. (Note: The French frigate Atalante had been wrecked on 3 November 1805 in Table Bay, Cape of Good Hope. She was repaired but Commodore Home Riggs Popham's squadron drove her ashore on 10 January 1801 in Table Bay where her crew burnt her to prevent the British from capturing her. Napoleon was a corvette that HMS Narcissus ran onshore on 25 December 1805 as Napoléon was coming from Table Bay. Napoléon's crew managed to escape. Napoléon, ex-Bonaparte, was a three-masted privateer from Saint-Malo built in 1803 and 1804, and commissioned at Saint-Servan in January 1805. Her draft was 3.35 metres empty, and 4.87 metres when fully loaded; she was of 400 tons (French; "of load"). She was armed with 28 guns (four 8-pounders, six 6-pounders, sixteen 32-pounder carronades, and two 36-pounder obusiers. She sailed to Isle de France (Mauritius) under Malo-Jean Le Nouvel with 147 to 180 men. She then made two more cruises from Île de France with 180 to 250 men, and 32 guns. French sources give the date and place of her loss as 23 November 1806 at Hood Bay.)

=== Merchantman ===
Lloyd's Register for 1806 still showed Atlas with G. Pilmore, master, and Temple & Co., owner, with her trade as London–Botany Bay. As late as 1808, Lloyd's Register still showed Pilmore as master of Atlas and her trade as Botany Bay. Clearly, her owners had not bothered to provide updated information. She then disappeared from both Lloyd's Register and the Register of Shipping (RS), not returning to the registers until 1814.

The registers were only as accurate as owners choose to keep them. Also, they published at different times of the year. Thus discrepancies between them do appear.

Year	Master	Owner	Trade	Source & notes	Master	Owner	Trade	Source & notes
1814	Turnbull	Bullcott	London transport	LR; good repair 1813				RS
1816	Turnbull	Bullcott	London transport	LR; thorough repair 1813	Turnbull; Short	Bullcott	London transport London–India	RS; good repair 1813; small repair 1816
1818	J. Short	Hills	London–India	LR; thorough repair 1813 & 1816	Short	Bullcott	London–India	RS; small repairs 1816
1820	J. Short	Hills	London–New South Wales	LR; thorough repair 1813 & 1816	Short	Bullcott	London–India	RS; small repairs 1816

In 1813 the EIC lost its monopoly on the trade between India and Britain. British ships were then free to sail under a license from the EIC to India, the Indian Ocean, or the East Indies.

On 25 June 1816, Atlas, Short, master, was at 35°40′S 22°29′E while sailing from London to Batavia.

==== Capture of a slaver ====
In February 1818 Atlas, Joseph Short, master, was sailing from Dundee when she encountered a Portuguese brig with 360 slaves from Mozambique. Atlas sent the brig into the Cape of Good Hope where HMS Eurydice detained the brig.

=== Second convict voyage (1819–1820) ===
Atlas sailed from Gravesend, England on 10 June 1819, under the command of Joseph Short. She arrived at Port Jackson on 19 October. She embarked with 156 male convicts. One male convict died on the voyage. Atlas left Port Jackson on 10 January 1820 bound for Calcutta.

== Fate ==
Atlas grounded on a shoal outside Poulicat, India, on 9 May 1820, during a terrible gale and was wrecked after splitting in two on the sands. Five crew members lost their lives. (Note: Another account states that only three crew members lost their lives, but it is not clear whether the discrepancy in casualty numbers is due to two missing natives having been found alive, or simply not being counted.) The wreckage was sold for "760 pagodas". (Note: These were presumably EIC "star pagodas", worth about 8 shillings each, making the value of the wreck only £264.)
