= Lord Forbes (ship) =

History

United Kingdom
- Namesake: Lord Forbes
- Owner: 1803:Forbes & Co.; 1806:Donaldson; 1810: John Card
- Builder: Troughton, Chester
- Launched: 31 October 1803
- Fate: Condemned and sold for breaking up 1817

General characteristics
- Tons burthen: 513, or 534, or 53435/94, or 548, or 550, or 556 (bm)
- Length: Overall:115 ft 7 in (35.2 m); Keel:91 ft 0 in (27.7 m)
- Beam: 32 ft 7 in (9.9 m)
- Depth of hold: 19 ft 0 in (5.8 m)
- Complement: 1805:70; 1808:50
- Armament: 1803:20 × 12-pounder guns; 1805:20 × 12-pounder guns + 8 × 12-pounder carronades; 1806:20 × 12-pounder guns "of the New Construction"; 1811:12 × 9&12-pounder guns; 1816:12 × 12-pounder carronades
- Notes: Two decks

Lord Forbes was launched at Chester in 1803 as a West Indiaman. She soon became an "armed defense ship", but by 1805 had returned to being a West Indiaman. She made two voyages as an "extra" ship for the British East India Company (EIC). She continued trading with India until 1817 when she sustained damage on her way to Bengal. There she was surveyed, condemned and sold.

== Career ==
Lord Forbes was launched in 1803. She appeared in Lloyd's Register for 1803 with Moundson, master, W. Forbes, owner, and trade Liverpool–Madeira.

Following the resumption of war with France in early 1803, concern developed in Britain about Napoleon's planned invasion of the United Kingdom. The British government's response took many forms including the reactivation of Fencible regiments and the Sea Fencibles, a program of the construction of Martello Towers along the coasts of Britain and Ireland, and the commissioning of a number of armed defense ships.

The British East India Company in November voted to underwrite 10,000 tons (bm) of armed transports to protect Great Britain's coasts. The vessels were existing, but not EIC, merchantmen that would receive an upgrade in armament and that would receive a naval officer as captain. One of the vessels was Lord Forbes; the others were Albion, Anacreon, Atlas, Aurora, Chapman, Diadem, Duckenfield, Helder, Indefatigable, Lord Nelson, Norfolk, Paragon, Perseus, Robert, Sir Alexander Mitchell, Suffolk, and Triton.

On 21 November 1803, Lord Forbes, of 548 tons (bm) and 20 guns, was reported to have been appointed to the Glasgow station. Around late 1804 or 1805 the Navy returned the armed defense ships to their owners.

Year	Master	Owner	Trade	Source
1804	Mouldson	Forbes & Co.	Liverpool transport	Register of Shipping

Lord Forbes returned to the West Indies trade. On 11 March 1805 the sloop-of-war HMS Imogen sprang a leak and foundered in the Atlantic Ocean off the Outer Hebrides while escorting a convoy from Jamaica to London. Lord Forbes and other ships rescued her crew.

On 14 July 1805, Lord Forbes, Lutwick Affleck, master, arrived at Cork from Liverpool. After he left Cork Juno's underwriters in London presented Captain Affleck with a bowl inscribed with the major facts of the engagement. The Liverpool Committee of Underwriters presented him with a bill of exchange drawn on London for £120 for the purchase of piece of plate. Affleck, when captain of Juno, of eighteen 6-pounder guns and 44 men, had resisted French frigate Poursuivante, of twenty-two 24-pounder and twelve 9-pounder guns, and 390 men in a notable action before surrendering to her.

The Register of Shipping for 1806 showed Lord Forbes with M. Sisk, master, Donaldson, owner, and trade London–Jamaica. Captain Matthias Lisk acquired a letter of marque on 25 November 1805.

On 18 May 1807 Lord Forbes, Sisk, master, had to put back to Port Royal. She had struck the ground while leaving from Port Antonio while sailing to London.

On 9 November 1810 the EIC accepted a tender for Lord Forbes for one voyage at £33 8s per ton. The EIC had Tebbutt measure and survey her. The Register of Shipping for 1811 showed Lord Forbes's master changing from M. Sisk to L. Edward, her owner from Donaldson to Card, and her trade from London–Jamaica to London–India. Captain Lewis Owen Edwards's date of appointment was 11 December 1810.

1st EIC voyage (1811–1812): Captain Edwards acquired a letter of marque on 4 May 1811. He sailed from Portsmouth on 21 June 1811, bound for Bengal. Lord Forbes was at Madeira on 2 July. She and the other Indiamen (Minerva, Harleston, William Pitt, and Lady Lushington left on 5 July under escort by HMS Emerald. Lord Forbes arrived at Calcutta on 6 November. Homeward bound, she was at Saugor on 26 February 1812, reached St Helena on 1 July, and arrived at Long Reach on 18 September.

The EIC accepted on 2 December 1812 a tender for Lord Forbes for a second voyage at a rate of £27 8s per ton.

2nd EIC voyage (1813–1814): Captain Edwards sailed from Portsmouth on 22 May 1813, bound for Bengal. Lord Forbes was at Madeira on 2 June and arrived at Calcutta on 19 November. She was at Saugor on 13 February 1814 and reached Bombay on 25 March. Homeward bound, she was at Tellicherry on 24 April, reached St Helena on 7 July, and arrived at The Downs on 22 September.

The EIC lost its monopoly on the trade between Britain and India in 1814. Thereafter the owners of merchant vessels such as Lord Forbes proceeded to engage in private trade with India under a license from the EIC.

The Register of Shipping for 1816 showed Lord Forbes's master changing from Beatson to Wiseman. Lord Forbes, Captain Wiseman, sailed from England on 2 September 1816 bound for Bengal.

== Fate ==
Lord Forbes arrived at Bengal on 22 February 1817 much damaged, having grounded on her way. On 2 April she was in dock undergoing repair. She was condemned and sold in Bengal in May.
