= Chapman (1777 ship) =

British merchant ship

History

Great Britain
- Name: Chapman
- Owner: Abel Chapman (1777–?); 1851:King & Co., London
- Builder: Thomas Fishburn, Whitby
- Launched: 1777, or 1776
- Fate: Last listed in 1853

General characteristics
- Tons burthen: 542, 55141/94 55756/94 or 558, (bm)
- Length: Overall:119 ft 6 in (36.4 m); Keel:95 ft 1 1/2 in (29.0 m)
- Beam: 32 ft 8 1/2 in (10.0 m)
- Depth of hold: 16 ft 11 in (5.2 m)
- Propulsion: Sail
- Complement: 50
- Armament: 1793: 24 × 6-pounder guns; 1812:14 guns, or 16 × 6-pounder guns

Chapman was a two-deck merchant ship built at Whitby in 1777. She made three voyages to India or China for the British East India Company (EIC), during the first of which she was present at the battle of Porto Praya. During the French Revolutionary Wars she served as a hired armed ship, primarily escorting convoys but also seeing some action. Later, she undertook one voyage to Mauritius transporting troops, one voyage carrying settlers to South Africa, and three voyages transporting convicts from England and Ireland to Australia. She was last listed in 1853.

== Career ==
Chapman was built as the Sibella, for Abel Chapman. However, she was renamed before completion.

=== EIC voyage #1 (1781–83) ===
Captain Thomas Walker sailed Chapman from Portsmouth on 13 March 1781, bound for Madras and Bengal. Chapman was part of a convoy of Indiamen accompanying a British squadron under Commodore George Johnstone.

Chapman reached São Tiago on 15 April. One day later, Chapman was present at the Battle of Porto Praya, when a French squadron under the Bailli de Suffren attacked Johnstone. Both squadrons were en route to the Cape of Good Hope, the British to take it from the Dutch, the French aiming to help defend it and French possessions in the Indian Ocean. The British convoy and its escorting squadron had anchored at Porto Praya (now Praia) in the Cape Verde Islands to take on water, when the French squadron arrived and attacked them at anchor. Due to the unexpected nature of the encounter, neither fleet was prepared to do battle, and the result was an inconclusive battle in which the French warships sustained more damage than did the British. The French did capture the Indiamen Hinchinbrooke (recaptured the next day), and Fortitude, and the victualer Edward, and gained a strategic victory, because Suffren beat Johnstone to the Cape and reinforced the Dutch garrison before continuing on his journey to the Île de France (now Mauritius). Johnstone went on to capture five Dutch East Indiamen and destroy a sixth at the battle of Saldanha Bay on 21 July.

Chapman arrived at Kedgeree on 11 September. She was at Barrabulla (on the Hooghli River) on 23 November, and from there she reached Madras on 10 December. On 12 January 1782 she was at Cuddalore, and five days later she was at Negapatam. She returned to Madras on 10 March. On 24 June she was at the Nicobar Islands. Homeward bound, she reached St Helena on 29 October and the Bristol Channel on 7 February 1783, before arriving at The Downs on 9 March.

However, around 11 March she grounded on "the Spaniards". On the 12th assistance arrived and got her off, but she grounded easily as the tide fell. She was not leaking and had to wait for the wind to get free.

Chapman, of "700" tons, built at Whitby in 1777, and with Chapman, owner, next appears in the 1784 Lloyd's Register. Her master is Dawson, and her trade is "Onega"-London.

=== EIC voyage #2 (1786–87) ===
Captain John Fox left The Downs on 12 April 1786, bound for China. Chapman arrived at Whampoa on 11 September. On 28 January 1787 she was at Macao. She reached St Helena on 23 April, and arrived at The Downs on 25 June.

=== Armed ship (1793–1798) ===
Chapman served the Royal Navy as a hired armed ship between 29 April 1793 and 12 November 1801. In naval service she was armed with twenty-four 6-pounder guns. She appears to have served as a convoy escort. In a gale in early October 1794 she lost her anchor.

=== Major repairs ===
Chapman was rebuilt in 1798 with most of her timbers replaced. So much was replaced that it was said that only one of her original timbers remained.

=== Armed ship (1798-c. 1805) ===
1n 1798 Chapman's captain was Commander Robert Keen. On 21 June, Chapman joined a squadron of frigates under Sir Thomas Williams assisting troops under General Lake fighting Irish rebels near Wexford. The harbour was too shallow for Chapman to enter so Williams directed her to anchor close in shore to cover the squadron's boats blockading the harbour to prevent the rebels escaping. Williams then ordered Keen to land and with three gun-boats to occupy a fort at Roslare. He did so, driving 200 rebels out of the fort and capturing three cannons. The boats then pushed up the harbour and captured the vessels the rebels had gathered. In the meantime, Lake had occupied Wexford.

Chapman returned to escorting convoys, mainly between Milford Haven and Plymouth. On 1 February 1799, Chapman sailed from Milford with 25 vessels for Plymouth. The wind picked up and on 2 February, one of the convoy, the Helen and Mary, Thomas, master, lost her bowsprit, foremast, and main-top mast. She hoisted a reversed ensign as a signal as a sign of distress. Because of the severity of the winds, it was not until the next day that Chapman could get a hawser to Helen and Mary. Chapman started a tow, but the hawser broke. Eventually Chapman was able to get a hawser aboard again and tow Helen and Mary into Falmouth; Helen and Mary would have foundered without Chapman's assistance.

In 1800 Keen transferred to Spitfire. Commander Thomas Browne was appointed to command Chapman on 11 August 1800. He received promotion to post-captain on 22 April 1802.

Following the resumption of war with France in early 1803, concern developed in Britain about Napoleon's planned invasion of the United Kingdom. The British government's response took many forms including the reactivation of Fencible regiments and the Sea Fencibles, a program of the construction of Martello Towers along the coasts of Britain and Ireland, and the commissioning of a number of armed defense ships.

The British East India Company in November voted to underwrite 10,000 tons (bm) of armed transports to protect Great Britain's coasts. The vessels were existing, but not EIC, merchantmen that would receive an upgrade in armament and that would receive a naval officer as captain. The vessels were: Albion, Anacreon, Atlas, Aurora, Chapman, Diadem, Duckenfield, Helder, Indefatigable, Lord Forbes, Lord Nelson, Norfolk, Paragon, Perseus, Robert, Sir Alexander Mitchell, Suffolk, and Triton.

Circa 21 November 1803 Chapman, of 555 tons (bm) and 24 guns, was appointed to the Leith Station. She arrived on 6 August 1804 at North Yarmouth, together with HMS Inspector and HMS Censor. On 26 November Chapman departed Spithead with a convoy. The Navy returned the armed ships to their owners around 1805.

Chapman then sailed to the West Indies, North America, and the Far East. Chapman reappears in Lloyd's Register in 1811 as a London-based transport with Pattison, master, Chapman, owner.

=== EIC voyage #3 (1812–13) ===
Captain John Constable left Portsmouth on 10 March 1812, bound for Bombay, Madras, and Bengal. Constable sailed under a letter of marque dated 8 January 1812; the letter authorized him to engage in offensive action against the French, not just defensive, should the opportunity arise.

Chapman was reported "all Well" at 9°40′N 19°4′W on 10 April and sailing in company with a convoy of Indiamen. On 7 May she was reported "all Well" at 24°20′S 23°14′W, together with a number of other Indiamen.

Chapman reached Bombay on 11 August and Madras on 24 August. She arrived at Calcutta on 14 September. Homeward bound, she was at Saugor on 30 November, reached St Helena on 16 March 1813, and arrived at Long Reach on 7 June.

=== Troop transport (1813) ===
Chapman sailed from England on 26 August 1813. She was in a convoy with General Hewett, Wanstead, and Windham, which were transporting convicts to New South Wales. The convoy also included Roxburgh Castle, which was carrying military equipment to the Cape of Good Hope. Chapman was transporting an army detachment to the Cape and Île de France (Mauritius). HMS Akbar provided an escort, at least for the early part of the voyage.

=== Convict voyage #1 (1817) ===
Chapman, under the command of John Drake and surgeon Alexander Dewar, departed Cork, Ireland on 14 March 1817, arrived in Sydney on 20 July 1817. The guards for the voyage came from the 46th Regiment of Foot. She left with 198 male convicts. An informer warned the officers that a mutiny was planned. It is not clear that a mutiny actually occurred. Officers, crew, and soldiers may have fired in panic on the night of 17 April. In the incident, gunfire killed 3 convicts. Gunfire on 28 April killed one more. Seven convicts died of their wounds, and two died of dysentery. Two crew members also died. Chapman eventually landed 186 convicts.

An investigation at Port Jackson by Judge-Advocate Wylde, Principal Surgeon and Superintendent of Police D'Arcy Wentworth, and Governor Macquarie's secretary, J.T. Campbell, found the ships officers, crew, and guards only guilty of misdemeanour, with Campbell dissenting. Campbell prevailed on Macquarie to require a trial in England. The key parties from Chapman, Drake, Dewar, and Lieutenant Christopher Busteed of the 69th Regiment of Foot (the commander of the army detachment), and several soldiers, came to trial at the Admiralty Sessions of the Old Bailey on 11 January 1819. The jury, however, acquitted the defendants, finding that the defendants' apprehensions excused the acts of homicide, even if the apprehensions did not justify them.

=== Voyage carrying settlers to South Africa (1819–1820) ===
In 1820 Chapman carried settlers from England to South Africa under the British Government's 1820 Settlers scheme. Captain John Milbank sailed from London on 3 December 1819 with 271 settlers. Chapman arrived at Table Bay, Cape Town, on 17 March 1820, and Algoa Bay, Port Elizabeth, on 10 April.

=== Convict voyage #2 (1824) ===
On this voyage Chapman was still under the command of Captain John Milbank and surgeon J. Hamilton. She departed England on 6 April 1824 and arrived in Hobart Town on 27 July 1824. She transported 180 male convicts, none of whom died en route.

=== Convict voyage #3 (1826) ===
Chapman, again under Milbank's command, but with surgeon J. Hughes, departed London on 10 April 1826 and arrived in Hobart Town on 7 October. On her voyage she had touched at St. Jago on 17 May and Rio Janeiro on 9 August. She left Hobart Town and arrived at Port Jackson on 3 November 1826 with 11 male convicts. In all, she transported 98 male convicts (two had been landed before she departed), and delivered 98.

Chapman departed Port Jackson, bound for Batavia on 25 November. Lloyd's List reported that Chapman had arrived at St Helena from Batavia after severe gales.

=== Later career ===
Year	Master	Owner	Trade
1830	Christie	Chapman	London—Quebec
1835	A. Christie		London
1840			
1845			Chapman underwent a large repair
1846	A. Christie; Ward	Christie & Co. King & Co.	Plymouth—United States; Plymouth—Quebec
1850	M'Mullen	King & Co.	Plymouth—Africa

== Fate ==
At some point Chapman was sold to Christie & Co., Plymouth. Then in 1847 Christie & Co. sold her to King & Co., Plymouth. She was last listed in Lloyd's Register in 1853. A letter from James Chubb Tolman to his son William, written from London on 29 September 1853, says that "... Chapman bound for Hobart Town ... sailed from Gravesend on the 13th last". The next year a new Chapman replaced her.
