= West Suffolk =

West Suffolk may refer to the following places in Suffolk, England:

- West Suffolk (county), a county until 1974
- West Suffolk District, a local government district established in 2019
- West Suffolk (constituency), an electoral district created in 1997
- Western Suffolk, a unitary authority due to be formed in 2028
- West Suffolk College, a college in Bury St Edmunds
- the western part of Suffolk

== See also ==
- Suffolk (disambiguation)
