= Nova Scotia Fencibles =

Military regiment raised in Nova Scotia

- Battle of Port Royal: 1690
- Siege of Port Royal: 1710
- Battle of Winnepang: 1722
- Northeast Coast Campaign: 1745
- Battle of Grand Pré: 1747
- Dartmouth Massacre: 1751
- Bay of Fundy Campaign: 1755
- Siege of Louisbourg: 1758
- Royal Naval Dockyard, Halifax: 1758
- Halifax Treaties: 1760–1761
- Battle of Fort Cumberland: 1776
- Raid on Lunenburg: 1782
- Establishment of New Ireland: 1812
- Capture of USS Chesapeake: 1813
- Battle of the Great Redan: 1855
- Siege of Lucknow: 1857
- CSS Tallahassee escape: 1861
- Halifax Provisional Battalion: 1885
- Battle of Witpoort: 1899
- Battle of Paardeberg: 1899
- Imprisonment of Leon Trotsky: 1917
- Jewish Legion formed: 1917
- Sinking of Llandovery Castle: 1918
- Battle of the St. Lawrence: 1942–1944
- Sinking of Point Pleasant Park: 1945
- Halifax VE-Day riot: 1945

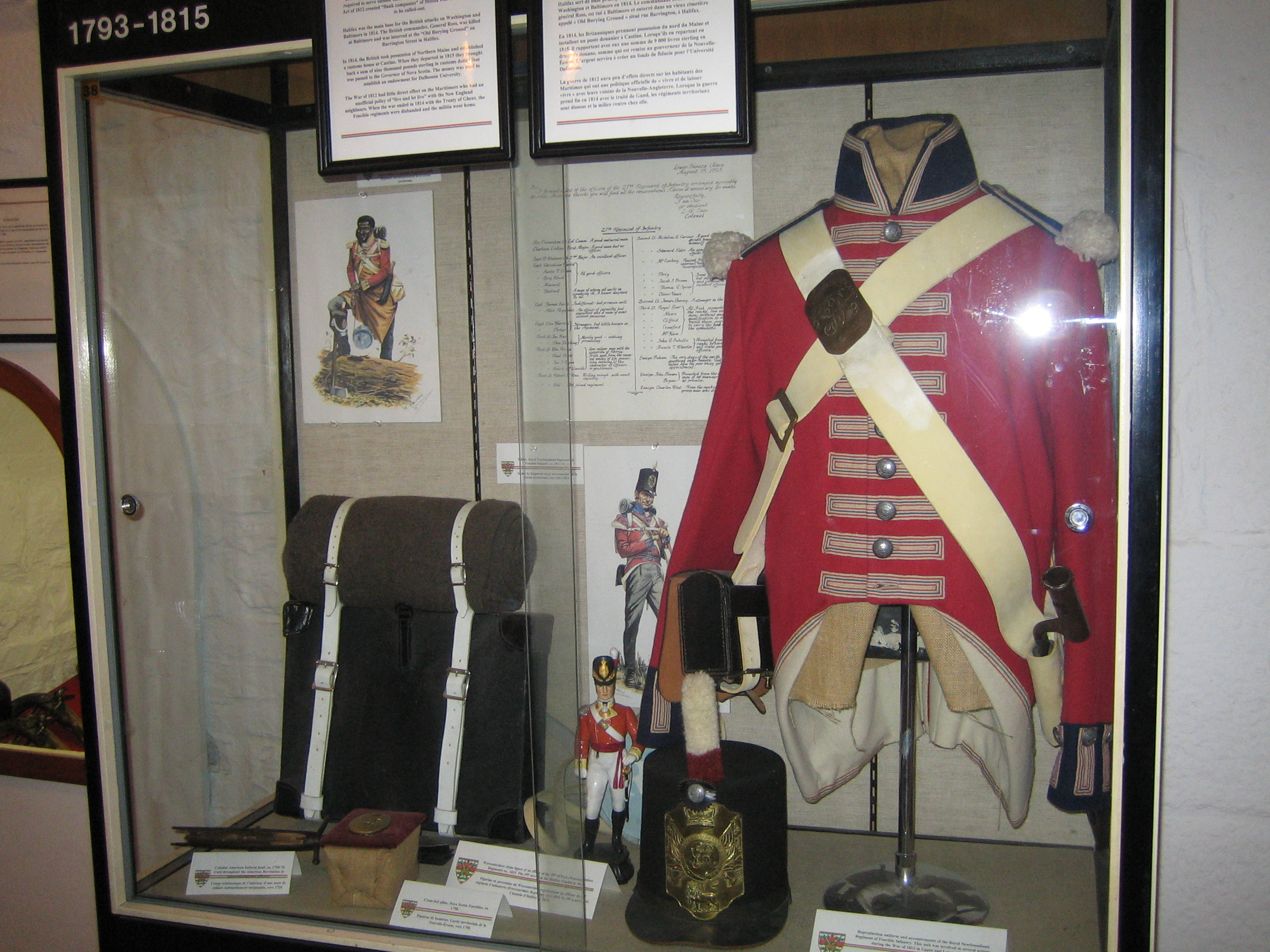
A display at the Halifax Citadel featuring pieces of equipment used by the Nova Scotia Fencibles, and the Royal Newfoundland Regiment of Fencible Infantry.

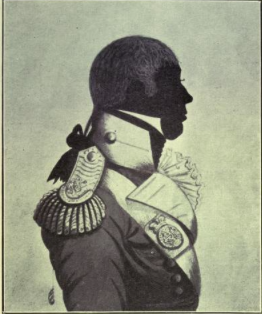
Otto Schwartz, Nova Scotia Fencibles, c. 1806

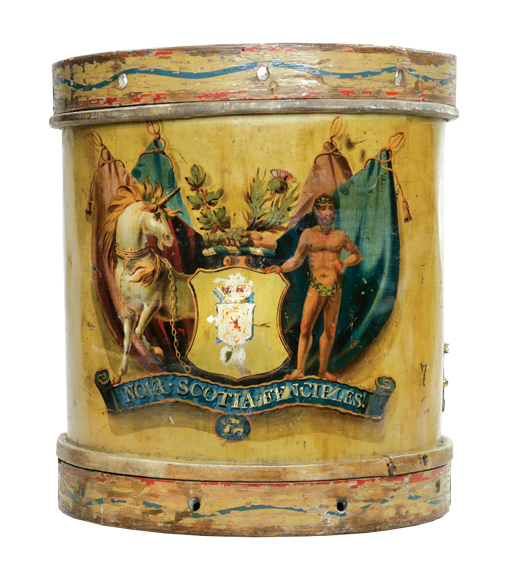
Nova Scotia Fencibles Drum

The Nova Scotia Fencibles were a military regiment raised in Nova Scotia in 1803. The unit had red uniforms with yellow facings.

== History ==
The Nova Scotia Fencibles were the only regiment stationed in Newfoundland in 1812.

Although posted to Kingston in Upper Canada in 1814, the regiment did not see action and was disbanded in 1816.

Half the unit, some 210 officers and other ranks, together with 48 wives and children, were on board the Archduke Charles when it wrecked on 10 June 1816 near Green Island, having cleared the Saint Lawrence River. The Regiment had marched from Kingston to Quebec and had embarked there for Nova Scotia. Four soldiers, two wives, and two children lost their lives; all others were saved. Contemporary accounts referred to the regiment as the Royal Nova Scotia Regiment, which had, however, been disbanded some years earlier.

== Notable members ==
- William Ross, d. 1822, Nova Scotia Fencibles; founder of Ross Farm, Lunenburg County, Nova Scotia
- Colin Alexander McNabb, Lieut. in H.M. late Nova Scotia Fencibles Regt., who departed this life Nov. 10th, 1820.
- Otto Schwartz, Nova Scotia Fencibles
- Colonel Edward Baynes
- Lieutenant Colonel Baylies of the Nova Scotia Fencibles

== See also ==
- Canadian units of the War of 1812
- Military history of Nova Scotia
- Royal Fencible American Regiment

== Links ==
- Regular British and Canadian Regiments in the Canadas
