= Adolphe (1803 privateer lugger) =

History

France
- Builder: Dieppe
- Launched: 1803
- Fate: Captured January 1807

General characteristics
- Displacement: 70 tons (French; fully loaded)
- Tons burthen: 43 (French; "of load")
- Length: Overall:17.86 m (58 ft 7 in); Keel:16.24 m (53 ft 3 in)
- Beam: 4.26 m (14 ft 0 in)
- Draught: 1.95 m (6 ft 5 in)
- Sail plan: Lugger
- Complement: 40-60
- Armament: 1804:14 × 3-pounder + 2 × 1-pounder guns (French pounds)
- Notes: Three masts

Adolphe was a lugger launched at Dieppe in 1803. She made several cruises as a French privateer and captured numerous prizes until January 1807 when the British captured her.

== Career ==
Adolphe was commissioned by shipowner Merlin-Dubreuil. From 19 November 1803 to 23 January 1804, her master was Philippe-Antoine Nicolaï. She was armed with 14 guns and had a crew of 40 men when she captured a ship that French records refer to as Amitié ("Friendship"). Friendship, Simcock, master, was carrying sheet copper and flour. She cam into Dieppe.

On 27 January, Jacques-Oudard "Bucaille" Fourmentin took command. He had a successful cruise, notably capturing Lisbon Packet and the 14-gun brig Marguerite. Lisbon Packet sold for 254,540 francs. Lisbon Packet, Jenkins, master, had been carrying tea, and Margaret had been carrying raisins and dying wood. Lisbon Packet came into Dieppe and Margaret came into Treport.

On 5 February 1804 Adolphe sent into Calais a British brig of 200 tons (bm), carrying sugar, tea, and gunpowder. Lloyd's List (LL) supposed that the vessel was Bassett, Purchar, master, which had been sailing from London to Falmouth. (Note: Basset, of 145 tons (bm), Purchase, master, had been launched at Emsworth in 1792. Her trade was London–Penzance.)

On 12 December HMS Favorite captured the French privateer lugger Raccrocheuse but the privateer lugger Adolphe escaped. (Note: Raccrocheuse №2 or Grande Raccrocheuse was a privateer built in Boulogne in 1804 and commissioned in Calais in October. She cruised under Jacques Broquant with 56 men and 14 guns until Favorite captured her off Dieppe.) Both were armed with fourteen 4-pounder guns and each had a crew of 56 men. Both were one day out from Saint-Valery-en-Caux.

Bucaille relinquished command of Adolphe on 16 April 1804. On 6 February 1805, his brother Nicolas Fourmentin took command of Adolphe in Boulogne and set out for a cruise. A report from France dated 10 February 1805 stated that she had captured the three-masted ship Royal George off the Isle of Wight. Royal George, of London, had a crew of ten and was carrying ivory, corn, flour, iron, tin, dye wood, and the like. Adolphe left her prize within three leagues of the French Coast. A report dated 14 February stated that Adolphe had taken into Boulogne a British ship carrying flour, dye wood, lead, tin plates, etc.

From February 1805 to February 1806 Adolphe made three cruises under Jacques-Oudard "Bucaille" Fourmentin. LL reported on 20 December that Adolphe had taken five prizes and that two had arrived at Le Tréport.

From February 1806 to some time in 1806, she cruised from Boulogne under Jean "Dejean" Fourmentin. French sources reported on 3 March 1806 that Etoile and Adolpe had sent William & Mathew into Calais. William & Mathew had been sailing from Sunderland to Sandwich when taken. (Note: William and Mathew, of 119 tons (bm), had been launched at Sunderland in 1800.) The privateers Eglé, Espoir, Adolphe, and Brave cut out a number of prizes from a convoy of 80 vessels. Betsey, of 150 tons (bm), with her cargo of wine and fruit, and the sloop Happy Return, with "90 guns in ballast", arrived at Dieppe on 30 April. "Dejean" captured Eden, and shared with his brother Nicolas, on Voltigeur in the capture of Narraton and Endeavour.

In 1807 she was again under the command of "Bucaille", and then cruised from Dunkirk under the command of Jacques-François Leclerc.

== Capture ==
On 26 January 1807, the armed defense ship Norfolk captured Adolphe. Adolphe, under the command of Jacques Francis Leclerc, was armed with 14 guns and had a crew of 39 men. She had thrown two guns, 14 carriages, her boat, and her ports overboard during the chase. She had sailed from the Dunkirk Roads on 21 January and two days later near Dogger Bank had captured Leith Packet, which was carrying a cargo of hemp from Tonningen to London. Lloyd's List reported that Leith Packet, Brooke, master, had been sailing from the Baltic and that her captor burnt her the day after capturing her.

The packet's master, five crew members, and three passengers were aboard Adolphe when Norfolk captured her. Norfolk took "Delpha" into Leith.

Adolphe appeared on a list of French privateers captured in 1807. That list reports that she was armed with four guns, and had a crew of 39.

== Legacy ==
The museum in Château de Dieppe has a model of Adolphe on display. (Note: Inventory number 967.17.1 or 4141 (MD).)
