= Lady Lushington (1808 ship) =

History

United Kingdom
- Name: Lady Lushington
- Owner: EIC voyages 1-3: James Loughman; EIC voyage 4: Nathaniel Domett
- Builder: B. & E. Adams, Bucklers Hard, Hampshire
- Launched: 1808 (Note: A source of this date gives the year as 1805, but that appears to be an error. She first appeared in Lloyd's List (LL) in 1809. Both Lloyd's Register (LS) and the Register of Shipping (RS) gave her launch year as 1808. She also did not appear in the registries until 1809 (LR), or 1810 (RS).)
- Fate: Wrecked 10 August 1821

General characteristics
- Tons burthen: 594, 634, or 6344/94, or 635 (bm)
- Length: Overall: 132 ft 3 in (40.3 m); Keel: 107 ft 2 in (32.7 m)
- Beam: 32 ft 3 2/3 in (9.8 m)
- Depth of hold: 13 ft 0 in (4.0 m)
- Complement: 1809:65; 1811:55
- Armament: 1809:14 × 12-pounder guns; 1811:14 × 12-pounder carronades

Lady Lushington was launched in 1808. Then in 1809 the British East India Company (EIC) chartered her. She made four voyages to India for the EIC and several others while under a license from the EIC. She was on a voyage to India under a license from the EIC when she was wrecked on 10 August 1821.

== Career ==
Lady Lushington first appeared in Lloyd's Register (LR) in 1809 with a listing of her departure on a voyage to India for the EIC. She first appeared in the Register of Shipping in 1810, also with a listing of her voyage to India. Because the EIC did not insure vessels sailing on its behalf, the registers frequently did not carry them in its listings of registered vessels.

=== 1st EIC voyage (1809–1810) ===
The EIC chartered her on 15 March 1809 for one voyage at a rate of £39 15s per ton, for 590 tons. Prior to taking her up, the EIC had her surveyed and measured by Peter Mestaer.

The EIC swore Captain George Nicholls in on 2 March 1809. He acquired a letter of marque on 5 June. He sailed from Portsmouth on 7 July 1809, bound for Bengal. Lady Lushington arrived at Calcutta on 15 December. Homeward bound, she was at Saugor on 15 February 1810, reached St Helena on 24 June, and arrived back at the Downs on 5 September.

=== 2nd EIC voyage (1811–1812) ===
The EIC chartered her on 9 November 1810 for one voyage at a rate of £33 10s per ton, for 600 tons.

Captain John Hine acquired a letter of marque on 10 June 1811. He sailed from Portsmouth on 22 Jun 1811, bound for Bengal. Lady Lushington was at Madeira on 2 July. She sailed from there on 5 July, together with William Pitt, Lord Forbes, Harleston, and other East Indiamen, and under convoy of HMS Emerald. Lady Lushington arrived at Calcutta on 8 November. Homeward bound, she was at Saugor on 26 February 1812, reached St Helena on 2 July and Falmouth on 4 September, and arrived at the Downs on 14 September.

=== 3rd EIC voyage (1813–1814) ===
Captain John Hine sailed from Portsmouth on 2 June 1813, bound for Bengal. She was at Madeira on 22 June, and arrived at Calcutta on 18 November. Homeward bound, she was at Saugor on 24 February 1814, reached Simon's Bay on 16 June and St Helena on 5 September, and arrived at the Downs on 16 November.

=== Licensed voyage to India (1816–1817) ===
In 1813 the EIC had lost its monopoly on the trade between India and Britain. British ships were then free to sail to India or the Indian Ocean under a license from the EIC. Lady Lushington's owners applied for a licence on 30 March 1816, and received the licence on 2 April.

Captain Thomas Dormer sailed to Mauritius and Bengal under such a license. He sailed from England on 10 May 1816. She arrived at Île de France (Mauritius), on 17 August, and Bengal on 25 September. She sailed from Bengal on 7 January 1817, and St Helena on 17 March. She was back in the Thames Estuary on 3 June when she ran aground at Sea Reach. Her heavy stores, 700 bales of cotton, and other goods, were unloaded into hoys belonging to the EIC. It was expected that she would be refloated in a few tides. She was gotten off on the 11th, apparently without damage. She arrived at Gravesend the next day.

=== Licensed voyage to India (1818–1819) ===
The EIC chartered Lady Lushington on 6 November 1817, for one journey. On 3 May 1818 Lady Lushington, Dormer, master, sailed from Gravesend for Bombay. On 29 May she was at Madeira and the next day she sailed for Bombay. She arrived at Bombay on 9 September. She arrived back at Deal on 28 March 1819, having left Bombay on about 18 October 1818.

=== 4th EIC voyage (1818–1819) ===
Captain Thomas Dormer sailed from Plymouth on 16 May 1818, bound for Bombay. She arrived at Bombay on 12 September. Homeward bound, she was at Tellicherry on 29 October, reached St Helena on 24 January 1819, and arrived back at the Downs on 28 March.

There is no mention in Lloyd's List's SAD data of any voyages by Lady Lushington in 1820. Thomas Dormer sailed from England on 22 May 1820 as captain of Coldstream. He died in Bengal on 10 October 1820.

== Fate ==
On 7 January 1821 Lady Lushington, Scott, master, sailed for Madras and Calcutta. On 15 February she left Madeira, and on 26 June she arrived at Madras.

As Lady Lushington sailed from Madras to Calcutta, she was driven ashore and wrecked on 10 August 1821, 30 nautical miles (56 km) north of the mouth of the Koringa River, near Vizakapatam. By one account 14 passengers and crew drowned. Another account put the death toll at 17. A third put the death toll at 22.
