= Suffolk House =

Suffolk House may refer to:

- Suffolk Place, or Suffolk House, a former mansion house located in Southwark, England
- Northumberland House, or Suffolk House, a former townhouse in London, England
- Suffolk House, Penang, an estate of two early residences in Penang, Malaysia

== See also ==
- Suffolk (disambiguation)
