= East Suffolk =

East Suffolk may refer to the following places in Suffolk, England:

- East Suffolk (county), a county until 1974
- East Suffolk (district), a local government district established in 2019
- East Suffolk (UK Parliament constituency), an electoral district from 1832 until 1885
- the eastern part of Suffolk
- East Suffolk line, a railway line

== See also ==
- Suffolk (disambiguation)
