= General Hewett (1811 ship) =

British East India Company merchant ship and convict transport 1811–1864

History

United Kingdom
- Name: General Hewett
- Namesake: Sir George Hewett, 1st Baronet
- Owner: 1813: M'Tagart; 1813: EIC; 1830: Tindall; 1854: Michael; 1856: Wilson
- Builder: Matthew Smith, Howrah
- Launched: 1811, Calcutta, Bengal (Note: The Register of Shipping for 1814 gave her origin as Bombay, which is either an error, or reflects a change of registry from Calcutta to Bombay prior to her sale in Britain.)
- Fate: Sold in 1864 for a hulk or to be broken up

General characteristics
- Tons burthen: 894, or 898, or 960, or 96052/94, or 970 (bm)
- Length: 147 ft 2 in (44.9 m) (overall); 118 ft 7 in (36.1 m) (keel)
- Beam: 37 ft 9 in (11.5 m)
- Depth of hold: 15 ft 0 in (4.6 m)
- Propulsion: Sail
- Armament: 1814:18 × 18-pounder carronades; Or: 14 guns
- Notes: In 1854, the Moorsom Commission devised a new measurement system Gross register tonnage (register tonnage). On this metric, General Hewett measured 1055 tons.

General Hewett, sometimes spelled General Hewart or General Hewitt, was a three-deck sailing ship launched at Calcutta in 1811. The British East India Company (EIC) purchased her to use her in the China trade. However, unlike most East Indiamen, on her first voyage from England she transported convicts from England to Australia. Thereafter, she performed five voyages for the EIC. The EIC sold her in 1830, and she then became a general merchantman. In 1864, she was sold for a hulk or to be broken up.

== Career ==
General Hewett was admitted to the Registry of Great Britain on 14 November 1813. She first appears in the Register of Shipping in 1814, with M'Tagart as both master and owner. By then her owner had sold her to the EIC. At the time the EIC purchased General Hewitt, the company had only three vessels of its own. It chartered all the rest, including the ones built expressly for the EIC's trade.

=== Convict transport (1813–14) ===
Under the command of Captain Percy Earl, General Hewitt sailed from England on 26 August 1813, with 300 male convicts, 104 crew, 70 soldiers, 15 women and five children. The soldiers came from the 46th Regiment of Foot and guarded the convicts. She sailed in company with Wanstead and Windham, and under the escort of HMS Akbar, at least for the early part of the voyage. The convoy also included Roxburgh Castle, which was carrying military equipment to the Cape of Good Hope, and Chapman, which was transporting an army detachment to the Cape and Île de France (Mauritius).

General Hewett arrived at Port Jackson on 7 February 1814, having travelled via Madeira and Rio de Janeiro.

The voyage took 165 days, during which 34 male convicts died, a large number, mostly of contagious dysentery. The losses on General Hewitt, Surry, and Three Bees led in 1814, to Surgeon William Redfern preparing a report for Governor Lachlan Macquarie on the sanitary problems of the ships transporting convicts to New South Wales. This report led to a great improvement in conditions, including the appointment of a medical officer for each voyage.

General Hewett left Port Jackson on 6 April, bound for Ceylon. She carried the main contingent of the 73rd Regiment of Foot (10 officers, including the commanding officer, Lt. Col. Maurice O'Connell, 362 rank and file, 96 women, and 163 children), which the 46th Regiment was replacing. They arrived in Colombo on 18 August 1814.

=== EIC ===
General Hewett made five trips to China or India for the EIC between 1816 and 1825.

==== Voyage #1 (1816-17) ====
Captain Walter Campbell left Portsmouth on 9 February 1816, in company with HMS Alceste and the brig HMS Lyra, which were carrying Lord Amherst on his 1816 diplomatic mission to China. The group reached Madeira on 19 February. Lyra and General Hewitt went on to Simon's Bay on 13 April, Batavia on 12 June, Hong Kong bay on 10 July, and Whampoa on 22 October. Alceste sailed to Rio de Janeiro and met up with the other two vessels on 9 June, at the Anjere roads.

After Lord Amherst had landed at Taku to proceed to Peking, Alceste and General Hewett had gone to Canton. There the authorities refused permission for Alceste to ascend the river and ordered the local merchants to deny General Hewitt any cargo. Alceste fired several broadsides at the fort and junks that attempted to block her way, and proceeded to anchor at the usual place. Shortly thereafter Alceste received fresh provisions, and General Hewett a cargo. The firing that had taken place at the mouth of the river was officially described as a "friendly interchange of salutes".

On her return voyage General Hewett crossed the Second Bar on 4 December, and reached St Helena on 12 March 1817. She arrived at the Downs on 12 May. Part of the presents for the Emperor of China, which Lord Amherst had not been able to deliver due to a disagreement between the British and the Court over protocol, had been sold in Canton and General Hewett was returning with the rest.

==== Voyage #2 (1818-19) ====
Captain Peter Cameron left the Downs on 28 May 1818, bound for Bengal and Madras. On 14 September, General Hewett arrived at the New Anchorage, Calcutta. As she made her way back down the coast, she reached Coninga on 30 December, and then Madras on 9 January 1819. Homeward bound, she reached Colombo on 28 February, Port Louis on 13 April, and St Helena on 30 June. She arrived at Long Reach in September.

==== Voyage #3 (1820-21) ====
Captain James Pearson left the Downs on 15 April 1820, for China. On 7 August, while navigating Clement's Strait, the eastern branch of Gaspar Strait between Banca and Billiton islands, General Hewett struck a rock and was aground for about 15 minutes. The rock came to be known as General Hewitt's Rock.

General Hewett arrived at Whampoa on 28 August. On the return leg of her voyage she crossed the Second Bar on 5 November, reaching the Cape on 28 February 1821, and St Helena on 31 March. She arrived at Long Reach on 30 May.

This return voyage was not without incident as His Majesty's Customs at Cape Town seized her cargo and that of Marchioness of Ely on account of defective manifests. This case also involved an issue of jurisdiction between the Vice admiralty court and the Court of Justice. The EIC's agent at Cape Town had to post bond in order for the vessels to continue on their journeys.

==== Voyage #4 (1822-23) ====
Captain Pearson left the Downs again on 19 June 1822, for Bengal. On this voyage she carried part of the 16th Lancers, which regiment was transferring to India. General Hewett reached the Cape on 1 October, and arrived at the New Anchorage on 23 December. She was back at the Cape on 4 May 1823, and St Helena 16 days later. She arrived at Blackwall, on the Thames on 26 July.

==== Voyage #5 (1824-25) ====
Captain Thomas William Barrow, who had served aboard General Hewett as first officer on her previous voyage, left the Downs on 23 June 1824, for Bengal. [General Hewett arrived at the New Anchorage on 30 October. She left Bengal on 8 March 1825, and reached St Helena on 24 May. General Hewitt, Barrow, commander, was reported to be off Weymouth on 18 July. She arrived at Long Reach on 20 July.

The EIC sold General Hewett to William Tindall on 22 September 1830, for £6250.

=== Merchantman ===
As a merchantman, General Hewett made numerous voyages to Australia carrying immigrants.

General Hewett received a new deck, wales, and major repairs in 1842. She left London on 20 October 1845, under the command of Captain Hart. On this voyage she carried passengers and cargo and arrived at Port Jackson on 21 January 1846.

Departing Plymouth on 11 August 1848, under the command of John Gatenby, she carried passengers and cargo and arrived at Port Jackson on 13 November 1848. She left afterwards for India.

Leaving London on 24 August 1852, under the command of John Gatenby, she carried passengers and cargo and arrived at Port Jackson on 24 December 1852.

In 1854, William Tindall sold General Hewitt to J. Michael, of London, for £6,250. General Hewett was sheathed in felt and copper fastened with iron bolts in 1854.

On 3 April 1756, Michael sold General Hewitt to J. Wilson, of London, for £4,550.

General Hewett, under the command of Christopher Loudt, master, left Plymouth for on 5 July 1856, and arrived at Portland, Victoria, on 9 October. She carried 366 immigrants.

Origin	Statute adults	Children (1–12 years old)	Infants	Total
English	110	39	7	156
Scotch	50	6	2	58
Irish	139	10	3	152
Total	299	55	12	366
Source: Merron Riddiford				

These amounted to 320½ statute adults, with the fare per statute adult being £13 4s 6d. On the voyage about four or five children were born, and the number of deaths was about the same. Agricultural laborers (105) and female domestics (60) accounted for about half of the immigrants. Married couples numbered 74, and single men numbered 82. There was labour strife on board with crewmen jumping ship when she arrived, others refusing to work on the voyage, and two assaulting Loudt.

== Fate ==
In 1864, General Hewitt was sold for a hulk or to be broken up.
