= Archduke Charles (1809 ship) =

19th century ship

History

United Kingdom
- Name: Archduke Charles
- Namesake: Archduke Charles, Duke of Teschen
- Owner: M. Lindsay; (Henry) Moore & Co.
- Builder: Simon Temple (Temple shipbuilders), Jarrow
- Launched: 20 September 1809
- Fate: Wrecked June 1816

General characteristics
- Tons burthen: 521, or 52130/94, or 525, (bm)
- Sail plan: Ship rig
- Complement: 1810:45; 1812:40
- Armament: 1810:18 × 12 & 6-pounder guns; 1812:4 × 6-pounder guns + 8 × 12-pounder carronades

Archduke Charles was built in Newcastle, England in 1809. She was sheathed in copper in 1810 and partially resheathed with copper in 1812. She made one voyage transporting convicts from Ireland to New South Wales, and on her return voyage to Britain she carried a cargo from China for the British East India Company (EIC). She was wrecked in 1816 while carrying troops from Quebec to Nova Scotia.

== Career ==
Archduke Charles first appeared in the Register of Shipping, and in Lloyd's Register (LR) in 1810. RS published before LR.

Year	Master	Owner	Trade	Source
1810	Turner	S.Temple; M.Lindsay	Shields–London; London–South Seas	RS
1810	Moore	Moore & Co.	London–Lima	LR

The mention of Archduke Charles as intending to go to the South Seas has led one source to assume that she became a whaler in the British southern whale fishery. Ship arrival and departure data in Lloyd's List, or Australian newspapers provides no support for such a supposition. Instead, Henry Moore apparently purchased Archduke Charles from M. Lindsay to engage in trade with South America.

On 20 March 1810 Henry Moore, master of Archduke Charles, acquired a letter of marque. This authorized him to take offensive action against French vessels, not just defensive action, should the opportunity arise. He sailed from Gravesend on 1 May 1810, bound for Lima. On July she arrived at Rio de Janeiro. On 27 October 1810 Archduke Charles arrived in Lima from London. On 6 July 1811 she arrived back at Gravesend from Lima. (Note: Because between 1810 and 1812, Archduke Charles was in the South Seas some sources suspect that she may have engaged in whaling. But there is no evidence for this.) She brought with her from Lima one of the four survivors of the Boyd massacre. She also arrived with 50 tons of bullion. Before she left Lima word had arrived that rebel had captured the silver mines at Postosi, so the government asked Captain Moore to unload part of the silver bullion cargo to provide the government with the money to pay its troops. Captain Moore cut his cables and sailed off before he could be detained. He carried a delegation (Colonel Don Francisco de Salazar, the secretary for the delegation, and two Peruvian colonels) from Lima with despatches for the Spanish minister in London. Then HMS Mutine had escorted Archduke Charles from Buenos Aires.

Because letters of marque authorized captains, not vessels, a new master required a new letter. Captain John Paul Jeffreys acquired a letter of marque on 20 March 1812.

In 1812, Archduke Charles, J.P. Jeffries [sic], master, transported convicts from Ireland to Australia. On 10 March 1812 she sailed from Gravesend for Cork, New South Wales, and China. She departed Cork on 15 May 1812. She called at Rio de Janeiro, where Indefatigable and Minstrel joined her. The three vessels left Rio together on 11 August, but Archduke Charles parted the next day. Six days after they left Rio, a gale separated Minstrel and Indefatigable. Archduke Charles lost her rudder in a gale on 8 September, which delayed her. She reached the Cape on 25 September. There she effected repairs and did not depart until 19 December. Archduke Charles arrived on 16 February 1813 in Port Jackson, New South Wales. She had embarked 147 male and 54 female convicts; two male convicts died during the voyage. She was one of only two convict transports after 1811 to carry both men and women convicts; after 1815, no vessel did. The 73rd Regiment of Foot provided the guard.

Archduke Charles left Port Jackson on 17 September bound for China. There were eight stowaways aboard. When Archduke Charles arrived at China the authorities apprehended the stowaways and returned them to Australia in 1815 on Frederick.

Archduke Charles left Whampoa anchorage on 24 January 1814. On 26 February she was at Linton (probably Lintin Island). She left China on 1 March with the fleet returning to Britain, but separated the next day.

By 19 June she had reached the Cape, and by 6 September St Helena. On 24 November she arrived at Blackwall.

== Loss ==
Archduke Charles sailed to Canada. On 29 May 1816 she embarked half of the Nova Scotia Fencibles regiment, some 210 officers and other ranks, together with 48 wives and children. The Regiment had marched from Kingston to Quebec and had embarked there for Nova Scotia. Archduke Charles wrecked on 10 June 1816 off Green Island on the Jeddore Ledges, having cleared the Saint Lawrence River. Four soldiers, two wives, and two children lost their lives; all others were saved. (Note: Contemporary accounts referred to the regiment as the Royal Nova Scotia Regiment, which had, however, been disbanded some years earlier. Also, some reports give the date of wrecking as 28 June.)
