= Suffolk (1795 ship) =

History

Great Britain
- Name: Suffolk
- Builder: Shields, Newcastle-on-Tyne
- Launched: 1795
- Fate: Broken up December 1844

General characteristics
- Tons burthen: 334, or 335, or 339, or 362, or 400 (bm)
- Complement: 20
- Armament: 10 × 6-pounder guns

Suffolk was launched in 1795 at Newcastle. In 1800 she made one voyage for the British East India Company (EIC). She traded widely as different owners deployed her on one route or another.

Captain John Luke acquired a letter of marque on 22 November 1800. Messrs. Princep and Saunders had tendered Suffolk, John Luke, master, to the EIC to bring back rice from Bengal. She was one of 28 vessels that sailed on that mission between December 1800 and February 1801.

Suffolk sailed on 25 December 1800 and returned on 28 February 1802.

Following the resumption of war with France in early 1803, concern developed in Britain about Napoleon's planned invasion of the United Kingdom. The British government's response took many forms including the reactivation of Fencible regiments and the Sea Fencibles, a program of the construction of Martello Towers along the coasts of Britain and Ireland, and the commissioning of a number of armed defense ships.

The British East India Company in November voted to underwrite 10,000 tons (bm) of armed transports to protect Great Britain's coasts. The vessels were existing, but not EIC, merchantmen that would receive an upgrade in armament and some cases a naval officer as captain. The vessels were: Albion, Anacreon, Atlas, Aurora, Chapman, Diadem, Duckenfield, Helder, Indefatigable, Lord Forbes, Lord Nelson, Norfolk, Paragon, Perseus, Robert, Sir Alexander Mitchell, Suffolk, and Triton.

On 21 November 1803 Suffolk, of 362 tons (bm) and 16 guns, was ready but yet to be allocated to her station. The Royal Navy returned the armed defense ships to their owners by the second half of 1805.

Lloyd's List reported on 25 February 1825 that Suffolk, Allison, master, had been blown out of Madeira on 25 January and that she had not returned by the 28th.

In 1836 new owners, Richard Wilson and George Foggo, shifted her registry to Whitby. She was broken up in December 1844.

== Note ==
Because Suffolk and Suffolk (1800 ship) both sailed to Bengal at the same time to bring back rice, and Suffolk (1803 ship) was launched in Bengal, the three vessels are sometimes conflated.

Year	Master	Owner	Trade	Source & notes
1796	J. Taylor	Hurry & Co.	St Petersburgh–Portsmouth	Lloyd's Register (LR)
1800	Dryscall	Abell & Co.	London–Jamaica	Register of Shipping (RS); underwent repairs in 1798
1800	W. Driscoll	Abel & Co.	London–Jamaica	LR; small repair in 1798
1802	Luke	Abell & Co.	London–Bengal	RS
1805	Driscoll	Caine	London–Bengal	RS; underwent repairs in 1803
1805	W. Driscoll	Carne & Co.	Falmouth	LR; thorough repair 1803
1810	Driscoll	Caine	London–Bengal	RS
1810	W. Driscoll; M. Kirby	Carne & Co. Herring & Co.	Falmouth; London transport	LR
1815	Kirby	Heron & Co.	Weymouth–London	RS; thorough repair 1810
1815	J. Boyne	Herring & Co.	Cork transport	LR
1820	Ellison	Herring & Co.	London–South America	RS; repairs 1816
1820	Ashon; Allison	Herring & Co.	London–Curacoa	LR; large repair 1816
1825	Allison	Herring & Co.	London–Quebec; London–Jamaica	RS; good repair 1822
1825	Allison	Herring & Co.	London–Jamaica	LR; small repairs 1820 and 1823
1830	Jackson	Scott	Hull–Africa	RS; repairs in 1828 and small repairs in 1829
1830	G.Jackson; Pratt	J. Scott	London–Gambia	LR;damages repaired 1828 and thorough repair in 1829
1835	M'Donald			LR; Liverpool homeport
1840	R. Day	Wilson	London–Baltic	LR; Shields-built, repairs 1831, Whitby homeport
