= William Pitt (1803 ship) =

History

United Kingdom
- Name: William Pitt
- Owner: James Loughan
- Builder: Liverpool
- Launched: 1803
- Fate: Lost 16 December 1813

General characteristics
- Tons burthen: 572, or 5721/94 or 604 (bm)
- Length: 124 ft 2 in (37.8 m) (overall); 99 ft 0 in (30.2 m) (keel)
- Beam: 32 ft 11 1/2 in (10.0 m)
- Depth of hold: 13 ft 3 in (4.0 m)
- Propulsion: Sail
- Complement: 1805: 49; 1809: 60; 1811: 50
- Armament: 1805: 20 guns; 1809: 16 × 18-pounder guns; 1811: 16 × 12-pounder guns + 9 swivel guns

William Pitt was a three-decker sailing ship, built in Liverpool in 1803. She made three complete voyages for the British East India Company (EIC), and on the first of these she transported convicts to New South Wales. In December 1813 she was lost in a gale to the east of Algoa Bay while homeward bound from her fourth voyage.

== Origins ==
She began her career as a West Indiaman. In 1805 Captain J. Jackson sailed her to London, where P. Maester fitted her out for the London to India trade.

== EIC Voyage #1 (1805-1807) ==
Under the command of John Boyce, she sailed from Falmouth on 10 August 1805, bound for New South Wales and China. Before she left she had loaded one male and 120 female convicts, but one woman was discharged prior to departure. William Pitt arrived at Cork, Ireland, on 14 August, and sailed on 31 August, carrying Gregory Blaxland and family. She left on the same day as Tellicherry.

On 29 September William Pitt reached Madeira. From there she reached San Salvador on 11 November, where she stayed for three weeks.

William Pitt sailed with the expedition under General Sir David Baird and Admiral Sir Home Riggs Popham that would in 1806 capture the Dutch Cape Colony.

She then arrived at the Cape of Good Hope on 4 or 6 January 1806. Shortly after she arrived the cannon fire from the battle of Blaauwberg (8 January) could be heard. William Pitt stayed at the Cape for five weeks.

William Pitt arrived at Port Jackson on 11 April 1806. Two female convicts had died on the voyage, as had three children, one of smallpox. William Pitt arrived some two months after Tellicherry, Tellicherry not having delayed at the Cape.

After some repairs William Pitt sailed on 25 June from Port Jackson for China arriving on 3 October.

She arrived at Whampoa on 21 September. For her return voyage, William Pitt crossed the Second Bar on 5 January 1807 and on 23 January reached Penang. She was at the Cape on 10 April, and 18 days later at St Helena. She arrived at the Downs on 2 July.

== EIC Voyage #2 (1809-1810) ==
Captain William Crowder left Portsmouth on 7 July 1809, bound for Bengal and Madras. He sailed with a letter of marque issued on 5 June 1809.

William Pitt arrived at Calcutta on 17 December. Homeward bound, she left on 22 February 1810, passed Saugor on 11 March, and reached Madras on 28 March and St Helena on 2 August. She arrived at the Downs on 1 October.

== EIC Voyage #3 (1811-12) ==
Captain Charles William Butler left Portsmouth on 21 June 1811, bound for Bengal. He sailed with a letter of marque issued 14 June 1811.

William Pitt reached Madeira on 2 July and left there three days later in company with Minerva, Harleston, Lord Forbes, and Lady Lushington, and under convoy of HMS Emerald. William Pitt arrived at Calcutta on 6 November. She left Calcutta on 18 February 1812, passed Saugor on 17 March, reached St Helena on 15 June, and arrived at the Downs on 14 September.

== EIC Voyage #4 (1813 and loss) ==
Butler sailed William Pitt from Torbay on 25 March 1813, bound for Batavia. She was homeward bound when she was lost in a gale at about midnight on 16 December 1813 while east of Algoa Bay; there were no survivors. (Note: Several EIC sources give the date of loss as 16 December 1814, but the first mentions occurring in March 1814 make that impossible.) A later item in Lloyd's List reported the date of loss as 20 December 1813.

One report passed on the report that Captain Evatt, Army commander at Algoa Bay, saw a large ship passing Algoa Bay westward on 16 December. Gunfire was heard off St Francis Bay (alias Camptors Bay) in the darkness a little before midnight on 17 December, and identifiable wreckage was found in that area thereafter. The second report, while adding some later wreckage details, moved those two dates forward to 17 and 18 December.

The EIC valued its loss on her cargo at £4502.
