= Minstrel (1811 ship) =

1811-1851 British ship

History

United Kingdom
- Name: Minstrel
- Builder: Barkworth, Paull, Kingston upon Hull
- Launched: 1810, or 5 February 1811
- Fate: Foundered 31 March 1851

General characteristics
- Tons burthen: 351, or 35140/94, or 354, or 357 (bm)
- Length: 104 ft 5 in (31.8 m)
- Beam: 28 ft 6 in (8.7 m)
- Propulsion: Sail
- Complement: 56 crew
- Armament: 1811:2 × 6-pounder guns + 8 × 12-pounder carronades; 16 guns

Minstrel was launched at Hull in 1811. She transported convicts to Australia in 1812 and again in 1825. Between these voyages she traded east of the Cape of Good Hope under a license from the British East India Company (EIC). In 1829 she brought immigrants from England to the Swan River Colony. She then traded widely, including across the Atlantic. Minstrel foundered in March 1851.

== Career ==
Minstrel first appeared in Lloyd's Register (LR) in 1811 with S.Dick, master, changing to J.Reed, Hall & Sons, owners, and trade Hull–London, changing to Hull–Lisbon.

Under the command of John Reid, Minstrel left England on 4 June 1812 with 127 female convicts. She sailed together with Indefatigable and they reached Rio de Janeiro on 29 July. There they joined Archduke Charles, which was transporting convicts from Ireland, also for Port Jackson. The three vessels left Rio together on 11 August, but Archduke Charles parted the next day. Six days after they left Rio, a gale separated Minstrel and Indefatigable.

Minstrel arrived at Port Jackson on 25 October. One female convict had died on the voyage, and one may have been relanded before Minstrel left England.

Minstrel left Port Jackson on 14 January 1813 bound for Norfolk Island.

Minstrel arrived from Port Dalrymple at Port Jackson on 4 April 1813 and left for England on 6 July. She had brought 63 passengers from Norfolk Island as the government closed down the penal colony there.

In 1813 the EIC had lost its monopoly on the trade between India and Britain. British ships were then free to sail to India or the Indian Ocean under a license from the EIC.

On 16 September 1815 Captain T.Harvard sailed Minstrel for India.

In March 1817 Minstrel, H.Bristow, master, sailed from England for Fort William, India.

On 17 July 1819 Captain H.Bristow sailed Minstrel from London for British Bencoolen under a license from the EIC. LR for 1820 showed Minstrel with H.Bristow, master, Palmer & Co., owners, and trade London–India.

Year	Master	Owner	Trade	Source & notes
1825	Arkel	Brown & Co.	London–Batavia	LR
1830	Arkol	Brown & Co.	London–Swan River	LR; small repairs 1825

In 1825 Captain Charles Arckoll sailed Minstrel on a second voyage transporting convicts to New South Wales. She left Portsmouth on 17 April 1825 and arrived at Sydney on 22 August. She had embarked 121 male convicts and she suffered no convict deaths en route. A detachment of 33 men of the 57th Regiment of Foot, under the command of a lieutenant, provided the guard.

Captain Arckoll sailed from England on 20 September 1829 with settlers for the Swan River Colony. Minstrel arrived there on 20 January. She landed 46 settlers.

New owners c.1833 transferred Minstrel's homeport to Newcastle. By 1839 her homeport was Hull.

Year	Master	Owner	Trade	Source & notes
1835	Skipsey	Smith & Son	Newcastle–Petersburg	LR; large repair 1833
1840	Jenkinson	T.Ward	Hull–Odessa	LR; large repair 1833 & 1836
1845	Jenkinson	T.Ward	Hull	LR; large repair 1833 & 1836, & small repair 1844
1850	Jenkinson	T.Ward	Hull–Quebec	LR; large repair 1847

== Fate ==
Her crew abandoned Minstrel on 31 March 1851 in the Atlantic Ocean. Nicholas (or Nicholas Biddle) rescued them. Minstrel was on a voyage from Hull to Boston, Massachusetts.
