= Duckenfield (1792 ship) =

Duckenfield (West Indiaman and armed defense ship (1792-1819))

History

Great Britain
- Name: Duckenfield
- Namesake: Duckenfield, Jamaica
- Launched: 1792, Thames
- Fate: Last listed 1819

General characteristics
- Tons burthen: 500, or 514, or 516, or 520 (bm)
- Complement: 1794:32; 1801:50; 1805:30; 1808:45
- Armament: 1794:10 × 9-pounder guns; 1801:22 × 6-pounder guns + 18-pounder carronades; 1803:18 guns; 1805:20 × 18-pounder carronades + 6-pounder guns; 1808:22 × 18-pounder carronades + 6-pounder guns; 1810:8 × 6-pounder guns + 14 × 18-pounder carronades; 1815:12 × 6&9-pounder guns

Duckenfield (or Duckingfield, or Dunkenfield) was launched in 1792 on the Thames. She was primarily a West Indiaman but between 1803 and 1805 she served the Royal Navy as an armed defense ship. She was last listed in 1819.

== Career ==
Duckenfield first appeared in Lloyd's Register in 1792 with C. Nockels, master, Nesbit, owner, and trade London–Jamaica. Her owners tendered her to the British East India Company (EIC) in January February 1794 on her return from her voyage to Jamaica. The EIC does not appear to have taken her up. Christopher Nockells acquired a letter of marque on 28 April 1794.

William Ogle Carr acquired a letter of marque on 22 August 1801. At that time Duckenfields's owner was Campbell. Her trade remained London–Jamaica.

On 12 August 1803 Lloyd's List reported the Duckingfield, Aitkins, master, had arrived in the Thames. She had parted from the Jamaica Fleet on 31 July in a heavy gale of wind that had left a number of the merchantmen dismasted and otherwise damaged.

Following the resumption of war with France in early 1803, concern developed in Britain about Napoleon's planned invasion of the United Kingdom. The British government's response took many forms including the reactivation of Fencible regiments and the Sea Fencibles, a program of the construction of Martello Towers along the coasts of Britain and Ireland, and the commissioning of a number of armed defense ships.

The British East India Company in November voted to underwrite 10,000 tons (bm) of armed transports to protect Great Britain's coasts. The vessels were existing, but not EIC, merchantmen that would receive an upgrade in armament and that would receive a naval officer as captain. The vessels were: Albion, Anacreon, Atlas, Aurora, Chapman, Diadem, Duckenfield, Helder, Indefatigable, Lord Forbes, Lord Nelson, Norfolk, Paragon, Perseus, Robert, Sir Alexander Mitchell, Suffolk, and Triton.

On 21 November 1803 Duckenfield, of 500 tons (bm) and 18 guns, was ready but had not yet been appointed to a station. A newspaper report dated 10 April 1804 stated that the armed transports Indefatigable, Albion, and Duckingfield, were to sail to Saint Helen's to maintain a guard there until Queen could relieve them.

Around 1805 the Navy returned the armed defense ships to their owners. The Register of Shipping for 1806 showed Duckenfield with Dunbar, master, Campbell, owner, and trade London–Jamaica, changing to London–Surinam. She had also undergone a large repair. Garden Dunbar, master of Dunkenfield, acquired a letter of marque on 11 March 1805. Captain Dunbar died on 18 August 1807 at Suriname.

William Cranitich acquired a letter of marque on 19 July 1808.

Year	Master	Owner	Trade	Source & notes
1810	Crautlech	Campbell	London–Jamaica	Lloyd's Register; large repair 1808
1815	Stephenson	Lyon & Co.	London–Jamaica	Lloyd's Register; large repair 1808

== Fate ==
Duckenfield was last listed in 1819 with Purdy, master, Oldfield, owner, and trade London–Jamaica.
