= Suffolk (1803 ship) =

History

United Kingdom
- Name: Suffolk
- Owner: 1810:Hugh A Reid; 1815:J. Short
- Builder: Hudson, Bacon, & Co. John Banister Hudson, Calcutta
- Launched: 6 August 1803
- Renamed: General Wellesley
- Captured: December 1814
- Fate: Wrecked January 1815
- Notes: Hackman conflates this Suffolk with Suffolk (1795 ship) and Suffolk (1800 ship).

General characteristics
- Tons burthen: 411, or 430, or 43050/94 or 431, or 440, or 480 (bm)
- Propulsion: Sail
- Armament: 1810:2 × 9-pounder guns + 8 × 18-pounder carronades
- Notes: Teak-built

Suffolk was launched in 1803 at Calcutta and at some point prior to 1810 was renamed General Wellesley. She made one voyage for the British East India Company (EIC) but an American privateer captured her in December 1814 on the outbound leg of her second EIC voyage. In January 1815 she stranded on the Charleston Bar and became a total loss.

== Career ==
Suffolk was launched in 1803 and at some point between then and 1809 was renamed General Wellesley. General Wellesley is among the country ships listed as having participated in the invasions of Île de France and Île Bourbon. However, the invasion of Île Bonaparte/Bourbon took place in July 1810 and the invasion of Isle de France took place in December 1810. General Wellesley had by then sailed to England, though she may have returned in time to the Indian Ocean to participate in one or the other.

General Wellesley first appears in the Register of Shipping in 1810 with Chawoet, master, Ried, owner, and trade London—India. She does not appear in Lloyd's Register.

General Wellesley was admitted to the Registry of Great Britain on 3 May 1810. Fitting her out in Great Britain cost £705 18s 10d.

General Wellesley was on the numerous transport vessels that the British government hired to support the campaigns to capture Île Bourbon and Île de France.

The British government chartered nine vessels as cartels, i.e., under a flag of truce, to carry back to France the French troops that they had captured in these campaigns. In addition, at end-March 1811 General Wellesley sailed from Mauritius to repatriate to France 120 people who had refused to take the oath of allegiance to the King after the British capture of the island. General Wellesley was travelling as a cartel. On 19 June HMS Curacoa arrived at the Cape of Good Hope, where she delivered an outbound convoy. On her way home, she encountered General Wellington and detained her, sending her into Portsmouth.

General Wellesley finally enters Lloyd's Register in 1812 with Brown, master, H. Reid, owner, and trade London—India. The Register of Shipping has the same ownership and trade information, but carries her master as Chawnet.

On 19 November 1813 Captain J.L. Heathorn sailed from the Hughli River bound for England on a voyage for which General Wellesley was under charter to the EIC. She was at the Cape of Good Hope on 1 February 1814, reached Saint Helena on 25 February, and arrived at Blackwall on 21 May.

The Register of Shipping for 1814 has General Wellesley's master changing from Brown to Heathorn, her owner from Reid to J. Short, and her trade from London—Cape of Good Hope to London—Île de France.

On 23 September 1814 General Wellesley sailed for Batavia.

== Capture and loss ==
As General Wellesley was on the outbound leg of her voyage she encountered the American privateer Yankee. Yankee captured her quarry on 5 December, at about 4°30′N 25°00′W and in sight of the convoy of which she had been part, and its escort. The Americans put a prize master and crew on board, and sent her into Charleston, South Carolina. The Americans also left her non-European crew on board.

On 12 January 1815 General Wellesley grounded on the South Breakers, apparently while being chased by a larger ship. During the night the prize master and some 12 men landed from the ship. They reported that some 60 men remained aboard, principally lascars and sepoys. Next morning when boats went out the rescuers found that the wreck was mostly under water. They were able to retrieve two white seamen and five lascars. Some 50 men, however had died, including the boatswain and another white man.

The prize master had brought out some three or four trunks, and Yankee had also taken out some valuables. General Wellesley had been carrying 18,000 bars of iron, plus some dry goods, brandy, porter, and the like. The prize master estimated that had it been possible to get a decked vessel alongside her before she sank it would have been possible to save her crew and also property worth some $20,000.
