= Suffolk (1800 ship) =

History

Great Britain
- Name: Suffolk
- Owner: 1800:Robertson & Co.; Later:R. Murray
- Builder: Graham, Harwich
- Launched: 25 June 1800
- Captured: 1805
- Notes: Hackman conflates this Suffolk with Suffolk (1803 ship), and Suffolk (1795 ship).

General characteristics
- Tons burthen: 369, or 377, or 377 70/94, or 430 (bm)
- Complement: 1800:25; 1804:32
- Armament: 1800:20 × 18&12-pounder guns; 1800:20 × 18-pounder + 8 × 12-pounder carronades; 1804:16 × 6&12-pounder guns

Suffolk was launched in 1800. She made one voyage for the British East India Company (EIC). She grounded in 1802 but was refloated. She then made a voyage to the Cape of Good Hope (CGH or the Cape). On her return she became a West Indiaman. A Spanish privateer captured her in 1805.

== Career ==
Suffolk entered Lloyd's Register in 1800 with Robinson as master and owner, and trade London–CGH. Captain John Robinson acquired a letter of marque on 26 November 1800. Messrs Princip & Saunders had tendered her to the EIC to bring back rice from Bengal. She was one of 28 vessels that sailed on that mission between December 1800 and February 1801.

Robinson sailed from Portsmouth on 9 January 1801, bound for Bengal. Suffolk reached the Cape on 8 April and arrived at Calcutta on 25 June. Homeward bound, she was at Diamond Harbour on 4 September, reached St Helena on 20 December, and was at Falmouth on 12 February 1802. Lloyd's List reported that she had left Bengal on 15 September, and that on her way she had spoken a number of vessels.

On 28 February a gale drove Suffolk ashore on the Cornish coast near St. Ives, Cornwall. She was severely damaged and lost two of her crew. She was later refloated and taken in to St. Ives These reports give the name of Suffolk's master as "Miller". They also report that her bale goods and some of her cargo of rice was saved.

Suffolk made a trip to the Cape between 21 September and 5 June 1803. Because she was not sailing east of the Cape, she did not require any sanction from the EIC.

== Fate ==
Lloyd's Register for 1805 (published in 1804), shows Suffolk with R. Murray, master and owner, and trade London–St Vincent. Captain Richard Murray acquired a letter of marque on 17 December 1804.

Lloyd's List reported on 14 June 1805 that the Spanish privateer Vangalure, of 16 guns, had captured Suffolk, Murray, master, on 21 May at 48°30′N 16°30′W. Suffolk had been sailing to London from St Vincent. On 14 June, Lloyd's List transmitted a report from the Journal of Commerce dated 6 June that Suffolk, Robinson, master, which had been sailing from St Vincent to London, had been carried into a port, but had not specified which port.

Lloyd's Register for 1807 still showed Suffolk with R. Murray, master and owner, and trade still London–St Vincent. However, the entry has the notation "captured" underneath her name. (Note: Hackman reports that the French had captured Suffolk in 1807 while she was sailing from St. Vincent for London.)
