= Royal George (East Indiaman) =

Six vessels with the name Royal George made voyages for the British East India Company, and so may be referred to as East Indiamen. The company actually owned one, four were on long-term charter, and one was a one-voyage charter. The vessels were named in honour of one or more of the British kings whose name was George.

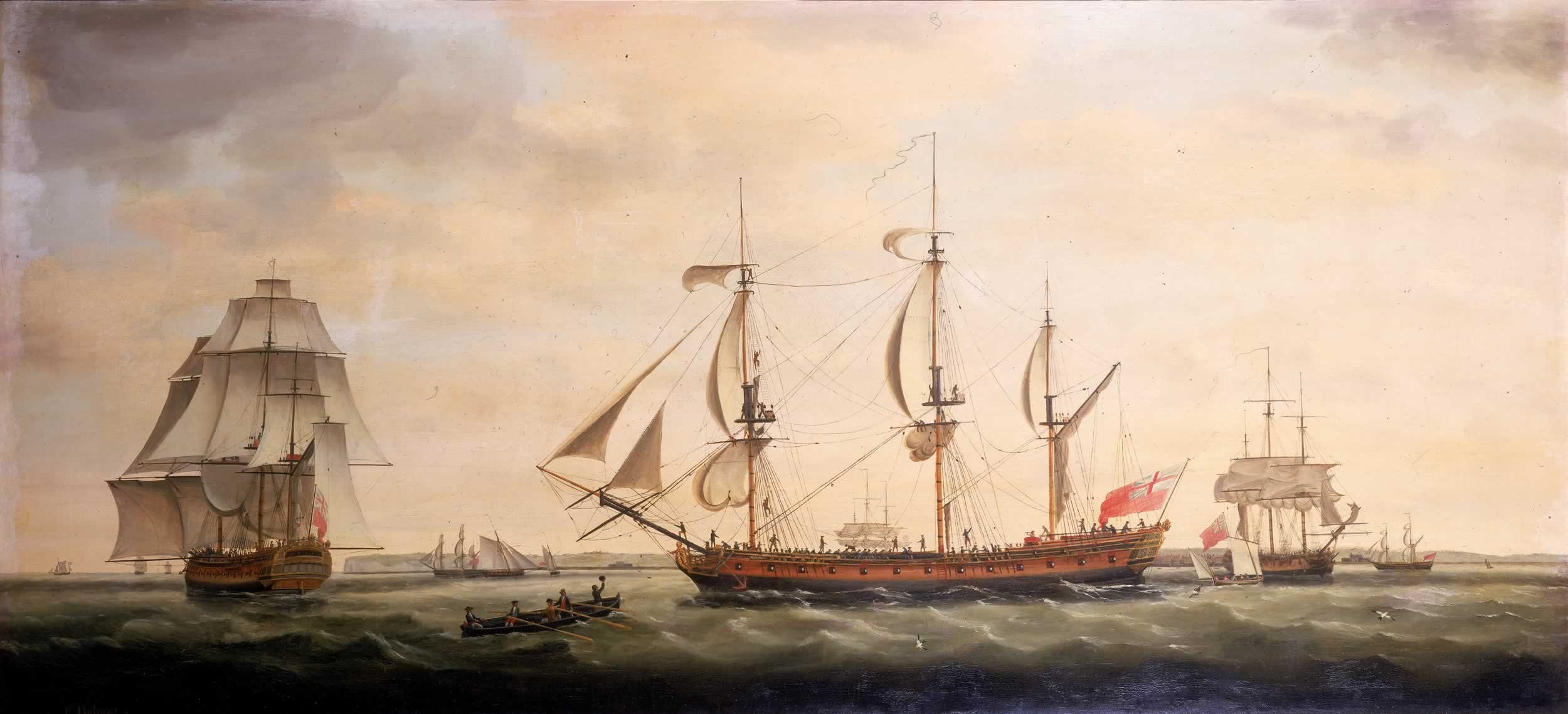
The Indiaman Royal George in Three Positions in the Downs by Francis Holman, 1779. Royal George was one of the five East Indiaman the Spanish fleet captured in 1780.

- Royal George (1737 EIC ship) was launched by Perry, Blackwall, on 2 August 1737 and was of 550 tons (bm). She made four voyages for the EIC between 1737 and 1750. She was sold for breaking up in 1750.
- Royal George (1758 EIC ship), of 430 tons (bm), was launched on 20 September 1758 by Wells & Stanton, Deptford, for the EIC. She and made three voyages while under EIC ownership. On 30 June 1767 the EIC sold her for 46,300 rupees to Captain Cleugh at Bombay.
- Royal George (1777 ship) was launched in 1777 and made one complete voyage for the EIC. A Spanish fleet captured her in the action of 9 August 1780. She then became the Spanish Navy 40-gun frigate Real Jorge, but was out of service by 1784 and broken up thereafter.
- Royal George (1802 EIC ship), of 133359/94 tons (bm), was launched on 12 October 1802 by Perry, Blackwall. She made seven voyages for the EIC between 1803 and 1818. She was sold for breaking up in 1818.
- Royal George (1820 EIC ship), of 142660/94 tons (bm), was launched on 10 October 1820 by Wigrams & Green, Blackwall. She made two complete voyages for the EIC before she burned at Whampoa on 24 December 1825.

== See also ==
- HMS Royal George - one of eight vessels that served the British Royal Navy
- Royal George (ship) - several vessels have made single voyages for the EIC, or after 1814 sailed to India under a license from the EIC
