= Indefatigable (1799) =

1799-1815 privately owned British ship

History

Great Britain
- Owner: Atty & Co.
- Builder: Ing. Eskdale, Whitby
- Launched: 1799
- Fate: Burnt to the waterline in 1815

General characteristics
- Tons burthen: 549, or 550 (bm)
- Length: 127 ft (39 m)
- Beam: 31 ft 8 in (10 m)
- Propulsion: Sail
- Armament: 1800: 10 × 6-pounder guns; 1804: 18 guns; 1812: 10 guns
- Notes: Hull sheathed in copper

Indefatigable was a square-rigged, three-decked, three-masted merchant ship launched in 1799 at Whitby for James Atty & Co. for the West Indies trade. In 1804 she served as an armed defense ship and recaptured a merchantman that a privateer had captured. She was a transport in the 1805–1806 British invasion of the Dutch Cape colony. She twice transported convicts to Australia; on the first trip she was chartered to the British East India Company (EIC). She burned to the waterline in 1815.

== Career ==
Indefatigable spent her 11 years as a transport, first sailing out of London and then out of Cork. The data below is from Lloyd's Register; it was only as accurate as ship owners chose to keep it.

Year	Master	Owner	Trade	Notes
1800	J. Brown	Atty & Co.	London transport	10 × 6-pounder guns
1801	J. Brown	Atty & Co.	London transport	10 × 6-pounder guns
1802	J. Brown	Atty & Co.	London transport	10 × 6-pounder guns
1803	J. Brown	Atty & Co.	London transport	10 × 6-pounder guns
1804	J. Brown	Atty & Co.	London transport	
1805	J. Brown	Atty & Co.	Cork transport	

Following the resumption of war with France in early 1803, concern developed in Britain about Napoleon's planned invasion of the United Kingdom. The British government's response took many forms including the reactivation of Fencible regiments and the Sea Fencibles, a program of the construction of Martello Towers along the coasts of Britain and Ireland, and the commissioning of a number of armed defense ships.

The British East India Company in November voted to underwrite 10,000 tons (bm) of armed transports to protect Great Britain's coasts. The vessels were existing, but not EIC, merchantmen that would receive an upgrade in armament and that would receive a naval officer as captain. The vessels were: Albion, Anacreon, Atlas, Aurora, Chapman, Diadem, Duckenfield, Helder, Indefatigable, Lord Forbes, Lord Nelson, Norfolk, Paragon, Perseus, Robert, Sir Alexander Mitchell, Suffolk, and Triton.

On 21 November 1803 Indefatigable, of 550 tons (bm) and 18 guns, was awaiting the designation of her station. On 10 April 1804 the armed transports Indefatigable, Albion, and Duckingfield, were ordered to St Helen's to maintain a guard there until HMS Queen could relieve them. In June Indefatigable escorted convoys.

On 20 June a 16-gun privateer captured Melcombe, Langrish, master, as Melcombe was sailing from Weymouth to London. Indefatigable recaptured Melcombe the next day and sent into Portsmouth. Indefatigable was under the command of Commander George Andrews.

On 12 July Indefatigable departed Spithead for Hull. She returned to the Downs from Hull on 29 August.

The Navy returned the armed defence ships to their owners in late 1804 or in 1805.

Next, Indefatigable was one of the transport vessels that were part of the expedition under General Sir David Baird and Admiral Sir Home Riggs Popham that would in 1806 capture the Dutch Cape Colony.

On 21 March 1806 she sailed with 16 other transports in a convoy to Great Britain with invalids and Dutch prisoners. The newly-captured and commissioned HMS Volontaire provided their escort.

Year	Master	Owner	Trade	Notes
1806	J. Brown	Atty & Co.	Cork transport	
1807	J. Brown	Atty & Co.	Cork transport	
1808	J. Brown	Atty & Co.	Cork transport	
1809	J. Brown	Atty & Co.	Cork transport	
1810	J. Brown	Atty & Co.	Cork transport	
1811	J. Brown; J. Cross	Atty & Co.	Cork transport	10 guns
1812	J. Cross	Atty & Co.	London transport In river	10 guns
1812	J. Cross	Atty & Co.	London-New South Wales	10 guns

== Convict transport ==
Indefatigable was under charter to the EIC and under the command of John Cross, when she left England on 4 June 1812, passing the Lizard on 7 June. She sailed together with Minstrel and they reached Rio de Janeiro on 29 July. There they joined the Archduke Charles, which was transporting convicts from Ireland, also for Port Jackson. The three vessels left Rio together on 11 August, but Archduke Charles parted the next day. Six days after they left Rio, a gale separated Minstrel and Indefatigable.

She arrived at Hobart Town on 19 October. Indefatigable had left with 200 convicts and she landed 199, one having died on the way.

Indefatigable left Hobart Town and arrived at Port Jackson on 6 December. She left Port Jackson on 7 January 1813 bound for England. She arrived at the Cape on 6 August, Indefatigable had been at Canton, where she had loaded a modest cargo of tea and no textiles. From the Cape she sailed to St Helena, where she arrived on 5 September. She apparently did not leave St Helena until 1 March 1814, but then reached Blackwall on 19 May.

On her second convict voyage, under the command of Matthew Bowles, Indefatigable left England in 1814. She sailed via Rio de Janeiro and arrived at Port Jackson on 26 April. She transported 200 male convicts, two of whom died on the voyage. Indefatigable left Port Jackson on 13 July bound for Bengal.

In 1813, the EIC had lost its monopoly on the trade between India and Britain. British ships were then free to sail to India or the Indian Ocean under a licence from the EIC. Indefatigable's owners applied for a licence on 9 August 1814, and received the licence on 15 August.

== Fate ==
While anchored at Batavia (now Jakarta), Indefatigable was burnt to the waterline in an accident on 23 October 1815 and declared a total loss. Her cargo was also lost.
