= Royal George (1798 ship) =

History

France
- Captured: 1798

Great Britain
- Name: Royal George
- Acquired: 1798 by purchase of a prize
- Captured: 1805

General characteristics
- Tons burthen: 176, or 180 (bm)
- Complement: 1798:35; 1805:10
- Armament: 18 × 6-pounder guns

Royal George was a French prize that the British captured circa 1798. She made one voyage as a slave ship in the triangular trade in enslaved people. She left that trade and then traded until a French privateer captured her in 1805.

== Career ==
On 24 December 1798 Captain James Walker acquired a letter of marque. In 1799 she made one voyage carrying captives from West Africa to Grenada. At the time her master was James Walker and her owner Thomas Kirkpatrick. She left Liverpool on 2 January 1799, bound for West Central Africa and Saint Helena. She arrived at Grenada on 11 November and landed 185 captives.

Royal George appeared in Lloyd's Register in 1805 with J. Walker, master, Kirkpatrick, owner, and trade Liverpool–Africa. A report from France dated 10 February 1805 stated that the French privateer Adolphe had captured the three-masted ship Royal George off the Isle of Wight. Royal George, of London, had a crew of ten and was carrying ivory, corn, flour, iron, tin, dye wood, and the like. Adolphe left her prize within three leagues of the French Coast. A report dated 14 February stated that Adolphe had taken into Boulogne a British ship carrying flour, dye wood, lead, tin plates, etc. A Royal George appears on a list of British prizes brought into Boulogne between 1793 and 1814.
