= Robert (1800 ship) =

History

Great Britain
- Name: Robert
- Builder: Newcastle upon Tyne
- Launched: 1800
- Fate: Last listed 1825

General characteristics
- Tons burthen: 358 (bm)
- Armament: 1804:16 guns; 1805:2 × 9-pounder chase guns + 16 × 18-pounder carronades

Robert was launched at Newcastle upon Tyne in 1800 as a West Indiaman. In 1804 she may have served as an armed defense ship before reverting to the West Indies trade. She was last listed in 1825.

== Career ==
Robert first appeared in Lloyd's Register in 1801 with P. Aylward, master, Baring & Co., owner, and trade London–Jamaica.

Following the resumption of war with France in early 1803, concern developed in Britain about Napoleon's planned invasion of the United Kingdom. The British government's response took many forms including the reactivation of Fencible regiments and the Sea Fencibles, a program of the construction of Martello Towers along the coasts of Britain and Ireland, and the commissioning of a number of armed defense ships.

The British East India Company in November voted to underwrite 10,000 tons (bm) of armed transports to protect Great Britain's coasts. The vessels were existing, but not EIC, merchantmen that would receive an upgrade in armament and that would receive a naval officer as captain. The vessels were: Albion, Anacreon, Atlas, Aurora, Chapman, Diadem, Duckenfield, Helder, Indefatigable, Lord Forbes, Lord Nelson, Norfolk, Paragon, Perseus, Robert, Sir Alexander Mitchell, Suffolk, and Triton.

On 21 November 1803, Robert, of 358 tons (bm) and 16 guns, was reported to be awaiting her appointment to a station. On 23 December, Robert, Ayleward, got on shore on the Brake sand near Deal and sustained damage. She would have to go into dock to repair.

It is not certain that Robert ever took up a role as a defense ship. In any case, around late 1804 or 1805 the Navy returned the armed defense ships to their owners, and Robert returned to the West Indies trade.

The data below is from the Register of Shipping and is only as accurate as shipowners chose to keep it.

Year	Master	Owner	Trade	Notes
1805	P.Aylward	Robinson	London–Jamaica	
1810	J. Black	J. Black	Greenock–Jamaica	Damages repaired 1804

On 27 January 1809, Robert, Black, master, sailing for Jamaica, had to put back into the Clyde, having sustained damage. On 3 February, she sailed from Greenock, again bound for Jamaica, but got aground on Fairlie, North Ayrshire. It was expected that part of her cargo would have to be unloaded before she could be refloated. She was gotten off and sailed for Jamaica on 14 February.

Year	Master	Owner	Trade	Notes
1815	Morris	Morris	Greenock–Jamaica	Damages repaired 1804
1820	Coulter	Ewing	Greenock–Jamaica	Damages repaired 1804
1825	Coulter	Ewing	Greenock–Jamaica	Repairs 1816
