= Harleston (1811 ship) =

UK merchant ship 1801–c.1825

History

United Kingdom
- Name: Harleston
- Owner: 1811-c.1813: Peter Everitt Mestaer; 1823: Davypersaud Ghose
- Builder: Jabez Bayley, Ipswich
- Launched: 25 January 1811
- Fate: Still listed at Bengal in 1823; not listed in 1829

General characteristics
- Tons burthen: 528, or 5283/94, or 537 (bm)
- Length: 123 ft 6 in (37.6 m) (overall); 99 ft 0 in (30.2 m) (keel)
- Beam: 31 ft 8 in (9.7 m)
- Depth of hold: 18 ft 0 in (5.5 m)
- Propulsion: Sail

Harleston was launched at Ipswich in 1811, for Peter E. Mestaer. She made one voyage under charter to the British East India Company. Around 1813, she apparently sailed for Bengal and then became a country ship in India; she was still listed in 1823, but was not listed in 1829

== EIC voyage ==
Harleston first appears in the Register of Shipping and Lloyd's Register in 1812 in lists of vessels trading with India. Both give her origin as Liverpool, her owner as Mestear, and the date of sailing for Bengal as 21 June 1811. In addition, Lloyd's Register gives the name of her master as T. Walker.

Captain Thomas Walker sailed from Portsmouth on 21 June 1811, bound for Bengal. Harleton reached Madeira on 2 July, and sailed from there on 5 July, together with William Pitt, Lord Forbes, and Lady Lushington, and under convoy of HMS Emerald.

Harleston reached Calcutta on 2 November. Homeward bound (albeit indirectly), she was at Saugor on 2 January 1812, and then reached Bencoolen on 25 January. She reached Saint Helena on 12 May and arrived at the Downs on 23 July. (Note: Benjamin Heyne was a passenger aboard Harleston from Bengal back to London. He wrote ten "Letters from Sumatra", nine between 10 March and 12 April 1812, and a tenth from London on 28 September 1812. These letters provide a great deal of description of Bencoolen and Sumatra, and some commentary about life on the ship.)

== Subsequent career ==
Harleston sailed out to Bengal to remain there as a country ship. In 1823 Harleston, of 537 tons (bm), and built in England, was under the command of D. Proudfoot. Her owner was Davypersaud Ghose.
