= Perseus (1799 ship) =

English sailing ship

History

Great Britain
- Name: Perseus
- Namesake: Perseus
- Owner: Reeve & Co.
- Builder: Thomas Haw, Stockton-on-Tees
- Launched: 17 June 1799 (Note: Bateson gives Perseus a launch year of 1789, but this is clearly incorrect. All mentions of her in Lloyd's Register and the Register of Shipping give a launch year of 1799.)
- Fate: Last listed in 1844

General characteristics
- Tons burthen: 362, or 364, or 37238/94 (bm)
- Propulsion: Sail
- Complement: 38
- Armament: 4 × 6-pounder guns; 1816:4 × 6-pounder guns + 4 × 18-pounder carronades

Perseus was a sailing ship built in 1799 at Stockton-on-Tees, England. She made one voyage transporting convicts to New South Wales, returning to England via Canton. In 1803-1804 she served as an "armed defense ship". Thereafter she served as a transport. She is last listed in 1844.

== Career ==
Her first trade was as a London-based transport, with T. Ellerby as master. Her next trade was London-Jamaica, under John Dick, master. During 1801, her trade became London-Botany Bay.

=== Convict transport ===
Under the command of John Davison, she sailed from Spithead, England on 12 February 1802, in company with Coromandel.

The contractor for the voyage provided the guards for both Perseus and Coromandel. This was an unusual arrangement as earlier the New South Wales Marine Corps and the New South Wales Corps had provided the guards. Later, regular regiments of the British Army provided the guards. The civilian contractor provided 20 men for Coromandel and 16 for Perseus. The guards were civilians and part of the crew, responsible to the master. The Transportation Board paid the contractor a flat rate of £75 for each guard.

Perseus reached Rio de Janeiro on 9 April, and the Cape on 25 May. At the Cape Davison purchased a number of head of cattle.

She arrived at Port Jackson on 14 August 1802. Perseus transported 113 male convicts, one of whom died on the voyage. The cattle too survived the voyage and Governor Philip Gidley King purchased them for the Government at £35 per head.

Perseus left Port Jackson on 7 October bound for China, despite having been hit by lightning. Perseus brought with her goods loaded in London for sale at Canton. Perseus returned to Britain on 9 August 1803.

=== Armed defence ship ===
Following the resumption of war with France in early 1803, concern developed in Britain about Napoleon's planned invasion of the United Kingdom. The British government's response took many forms including the reactivation of Fencible regiments and the Sea Fencibles, a program of the construction of Martello Towers along the coasts of Britain and Ireland, and the commissioning of a number of armed defense ships.

The British East India Company in November voted to underwrite 10,000 tons (bm) of armed transports to protect Great Britain's coasts. The vessels were existing, but not EIC, merchantmen that would receive an upgrade in armament and some would receive a naval officer as captain. The vessels were: Albion, Anacreon, Atlas, Aurora, Chapman, Diadem, Duckenfield, Helder, Indefatigable, Lord Forbes, Lord Nelson, Norfolk, Paragon, Perseus, Robert, Sir Alexander Mitchell, Suffolk, and Triton.

On 21 November 1803 Perseus, of 362 tons (bm) and 20 guns, was awaiting the designation of her station. On 29 August 1804 the armed defense ships Perseus and Ranger departed the Downs, together with the armed transports Princess Royal, Indefatigable, and Whitby. They were sailing for off Boulogne. On 6 September Perseus arrived in the Downs from Dungeness. On 10 September the "Perseus armed defense ship" sailed for Shields. In late 1804 and early 1805 the Navy returned the armed defense ships to their owners.

=== Later career ===
By 1809-10 Perseus was a transport operating out of Cowes.

In 1815 Perseus disappears from the Register of Shipping as she was undergoing some repairs. She returned to the Register in 1816 with Baynes, master, changing to Richards, and trade London—Baltic, changing to London—Archangel.

In 1825 Perseus's master was Jackson, and she was sailing from Plymouth to Quebec, and from Quebec to New York. On 28 January 1825 Perseus put into Plymouth. She had sailed from Liverpool on 6 January, and on the 18th had encountered gales at 46°N 22°W that caused her to spring a leak. Then, when she was three to four leagues from Scilly she struck a sunken rock. On 22 February she started unloading to facilitate repairs. The damages required Perseus to undergo a "large repair".

In 1830 Jackson was still master of Perseus, but ownership had changed to Gillespie.

In 1835 Perseus's master was G. Bruce, her owner was Holderness, she was registered at Hull, and she was sailing between Hull and Liverpool.

In 1840, Perseus's master was Rowan, and she was sailing between London and "Mermc". This entry continued essentially unchanged through 1844. Perseus is no longer listed in 1845.
