= HMS Suffolk =

Six ships of the Royal Navy have borne the name HMS Suffolk, after the county of Suffolk:

- HMS Suffolk (1680) was a 70-gun third rate launched in 1680, rebuilt in 1699, 1718 and 1739, and broken up in 1765.
- HMS Suffolk (1694) was a 30-gun storeship purchased in 1694 and sold in 1713.
- HMS Suffolk (1765) was a 74-gun third rate launched in 1765 and sold in 1803.
- HMS Suffolk was a prison ship launched in 1775 as the 74-gun third rate HMS Sultan. She became a prison ship in 1797, was renamed HMS Suffolk in 1805, and was sold in 1816.
- HMS Suffolk (1903) was a Monmouth-class armoured cruiser launched in 1903 and sold in 1920.
- HMS Suffolk (55) was a County-class heavy cruiser launched in 1926 and sold for breaking up in 1948.

== See also ==
- A fictional HMS Suffolk, played by the Type 23 frigate HMS Grafton, appeared in the ITV drama Making Waves
