= HMS Royal George =

Eight ships of the Royal Navy have been named HMS Royal George after various members of the House of Hanover. A ninth was renamed before being launched:

- HMS Royal George was a 100-gun first-rate ship of the line launched as HMS Royal James in 1675. She was renamed HMS Victory in 1691, HMS Royal George in 1714 and HMS Victory again in 1715.
- HMS Royal George was a 100-gun first rate launched as Royal Charles in 1673 and renamed HMS Queen in 1693, HMS Royal George in 1715 and HMS Royal Anne in 1756.
- HMS Royal George (1756) was a 100-gun first rate launched in 1756. She served in the Seven Years' War and the American War of Independence and sank at Spithead in 1782.
- HMS Royal George (1776) was a 20-gun sloop listed as serving on the Canadian lakes in 1776.
- HMS Royal George (1788) was a 100-gun first rate launched in 1788 and broken up in 1822.
- HMS Royal George (1809) was a 20-gun sloop launched in 1809. She served on the Canadian lakes in the War of 1812, was renamed HMS Niagara in 1814 and was sold in 1837.
- HMY Royal George was a yacht launched in 1817 and broken up in 1905.
- HMS Royal George (1827) was a 120-gun first rate launched in 1827, fitted with screw propulsion in 1853 and sold in 1875.
- HMS Royal George was to have been a battleship, but she was renamed HMS King George V before she was launched in 1911.

== See also ==
Royal George (East Indiaman)
