= Wanstead (1813 ship) =

History

United Kingdom
- Name: Wanstead
- Owner: Henry Moore
- Launched: 1811, Newbury Point
- Acquired: 1813 by purchase of a prize
- Fate: Wrecked 1816

General characteristics
- Tons burthen: 253 (bm)
- Draught: 15 feet (4.6 m)
- Propulsion: Sail
- Complement: 21
- Armament: 10 × 9-pounder short guns "of the New Construction"

Wanstead was a two-decker sailing ship built of fir in 1811 in America at Newbury Point, almost surely under another name. She was taken in prize circa 1813. As Wanstead she made one voyage transporting convicts to Australia. She then returned to merchant trade but was wrecked off Brazil in 1816.

== Career ==
Wanstead first appeared in Lloyd's Register (LR) in 1813. Her hull was sheathed in copper in 1813.

Year	Master	Owner	Trade	Source
1813	H.Moore	H.Moore	London–Botany Bay	LR

Under the command of Henry Moore she sailed from Spithead, England on 24 August 1813, and arrived at Port Jackson on 9 January 1814. When she left Britain she sailed in company with, among others, Windham and General Hewett, and with HMS Akbar providing an escort for the first part the journey. Wanstead was to transport 120 female convicts, but one was landed before the ship left Britain. Two of the convicts died on the voyage. One of the women on board was Elizabeth Chidlow, a co-conspirator of the forger William Booth.

Wanstead left Port Jackson on 10 February 1814 bound for Batavia.

Lloyd's Register for 1815 still showed her trade as London-Botany Bay, but indicated that she had received a new master, J. Strickland, later in the year. The next year Moore was still Wanstead's owner, and Strickland her master, but she was no longer armed, and her trade was Liverpool–the Brazils.

== Loss ==
Lloyd's List reported in December 1816 that Wanstead, Strickland, master, sailing from Maranham to Liverpool, had been wrecked off Maranham.
