= Sea Fencibles =

Former British military reserve force

- Active: 1798–1810
- Country: Great Britain; United Kingdom
- Branch: Fencibles
- Type: Military reserve force
- Role: Coastal defence
- Size: 30,000 (1805)

The Sea Fencibles were a British military reserve force raised in 1798 during the French Revolutionary and Napoleonic Wars. Comprising naval fencible units, the force was created to carry out coastal defence duties and obstruct enemy shipping. The Sea Fencibles were created on the initiative of Captain Sir Home Popham of the Royal Navy, who developed the concept while serving in the Flanders campaign; in 1793 Popham had organised local fishermen in Nieuwpoort into an ad hoc naval militia to attack French ships along the coast. In 1798, he suggested to the Admiralty that a similar force be raised in Britain to defend against a planned French invasion, which was approved.

Recruitment efforts for the Sea Fencibles were very successful, with 23,500 men volunteering for the force in its first four years of existence, many of whom were attempting to protect themselves from impressment. The Sea Fencibles were assigned a variety of duties, including manning defensive fortifications along the British coast, patrolling and surveying beaches were French invasion forces could land and manning a fleet of armed merchant vessels tasked with attacking enemy ships, including invasion barges. The force was divided into 36 companies, with each company responsible for patrolling and defending a section of the British coast. The Sea Fencibles were fully disbanded by the Admiralty in 1810 as the threat of French invasion faded.

== Great Britain ==
=== Inception ===
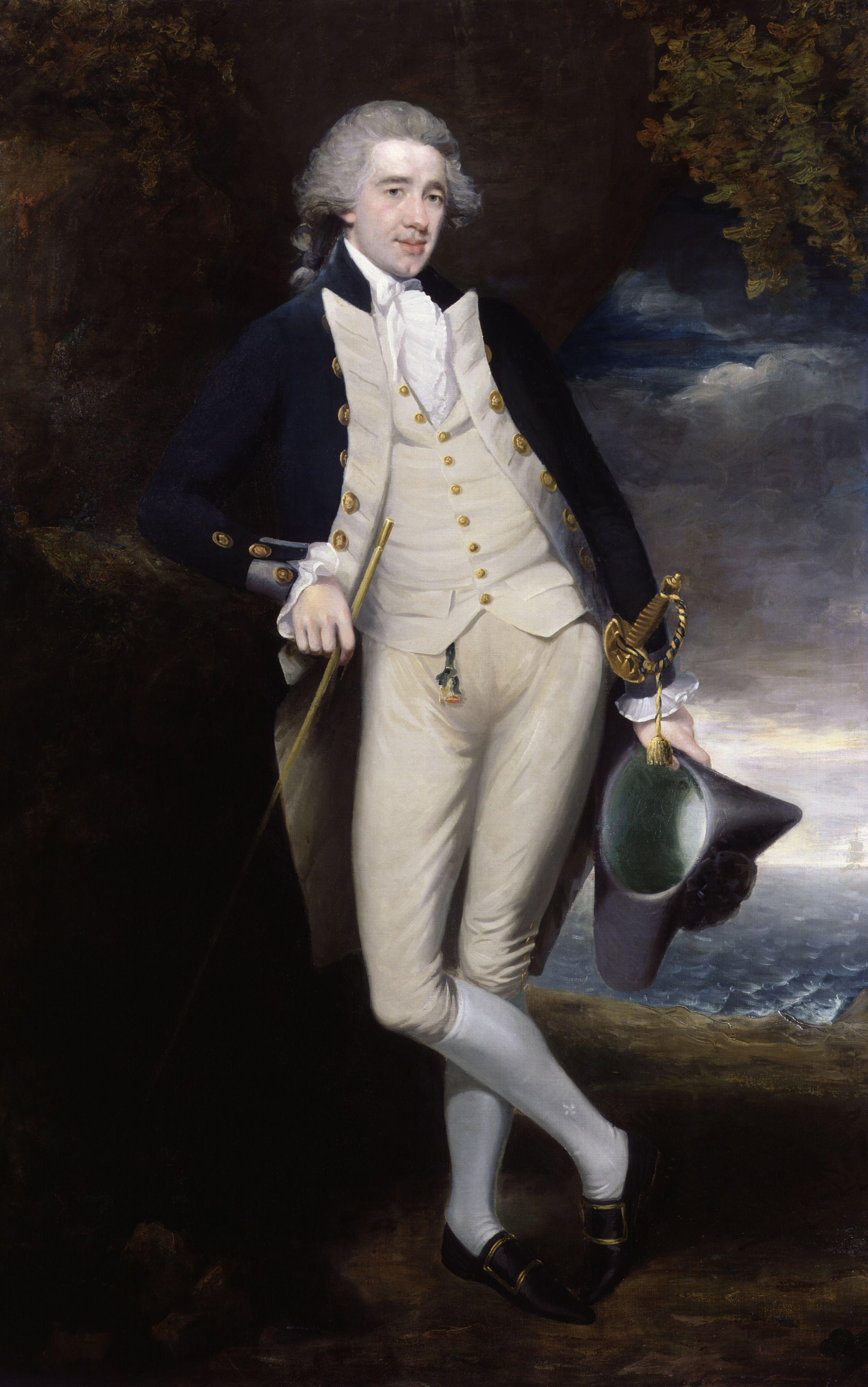
Sir Home Popham, the originator of the "Sea Fencibles" concept

Captain Sir Home Popham of the Royal Navy developed the Sea Fencibles concept while serving as Britain's Agent for Transport in Flanders during the French Revolutionary Wars. In July 1793, Popham went to Ostend to oversee the fleet of Navy transports supplying the British Army. In October a French army of 12,000 men laid siege to the British-held town of Nieuwpoort, which was defended by a garrison of 1,300. The French capture of Neiuwpoort would have cleared the path for an assault on the British headquarters at Ostend.

In support of the Nieuwpoort garrison, Popham armed and equipped the town's fishing fleet and led it in action against French vessels along the coast. In correspondence with the Admiralty Popham named his impromptu fleet the "Sea Fencibles," drawing an analogy with the land-based Scottish Highland Fencible Corps. After three days the French abandoned the siege and withdrew towards Toulon. Both the Army's Commander-in-Chief the Duke of York and field commander General Sir Charles Grey subsequently acknowledged that Popham's actions in "arming the fishermen of Flanders in defence of their own towns" had played a significant role in preserving British control of Nieuwpoort.

Popham himself was also impressed with the success of the Sea Fencibles in keeping the coast clear of enemy landing craft. When a French invasion of Britain appeared imminent in 1798, Popham recommended that Admiralty create a similar body to defend the coast between Cornwall and the Firth of Forth. On 1 February, Popham went to Hastings with the proposals from the Lords of the Admiralty, for raising a Corps of Sea Fencibles, to Man the batteries erected near Hastings and Pevensey Bay, for the defence of the Coast. Over 200 persons chiefly sailors, enrolled themselves for the Service. Britain's Sea Fencibles were duly formed on 14 May 1798 "for the protection of the coast, either on shore or afloat; comprising all fishermen and other persons occupied in the ports, and on the coast, who, from their occupations are to be unpressed." Their tasks were to defend the Martello towers along the British coastline, patrol and survey the beaches where a French invasion force might land, and to maintain a fleet of armed commercial vessels in order to capture enemy shipping and defend against invasion barges.

=== Structure ===
The Sea Fencibles were divided into 36 companies, with each company responsible for patrolling and defending a section of the coastline. Company command was vested in three Royal Navy captains and up to six Lieutenants per district. The district captains reported in turn to the Director of Sea Fencibles, an admiral. In 1803 this was Sir Edmund Nagle. A senior Sea Fencibles captain received £1 15s a day (equivalent to £127 today), junior captains received £1 10s (equivalent to £109 today), and Lieutenants 8s 6d (equivalent to £31 today). Petty Officers received 2s 6d (equivalent to £9 today) for each day they assembled, while Ordinary Seamen received 1 shilling and provisions (food and drink), or 2 shillings if no provisions were available (equivalent to £4 and £7 today). Sea Fencibles were also eligible to receive prize and salvage money. For example, on 13 June 1805 the sixth-rate frigate Vestal and the Sea Fencibles recaptured the Industry, off Hastings, and shared the subsequent salvage money.

Sea Fencible volunteers were trained in the use of arms and were required to man watch and signal towers, and fixed and floating batteries along the coasts and ports. Those who operated commercial vessels, for example local fishermen, received up to four cannons per craft and training in their maintenance and use. The Admiralty commissioned a small number of armed vessels for use in districts where there were insufficient private craft to meet a Sea Fencible company's needs. A member of the Sea Fencibles would spend one day a week training. They were also allowed to choose their own Petty Officers at the rate of one per 25 men. All Sea Fencibles received a certificate that exempted them from impressment into the Navy. The Treasury argued that the exemption from impressment was the principal reason smugglers joined as impressment was a common punishment for smuggling.

The Sea Fencibles operated in accordance with letters of marque authorising the capture of French or Spanish merchant shipping and a share of the proceeds should the seized vessel then be sold. Their fleet consisted of small vessels such as colliers and coasting vessels such as hoys adapted to serve as gunboats. The owners were expected to pay for the fitting of slides, ring and eye bolts for the installation of guns, usually two forward and two aft, and in smaller craft to fit sweeps for use in calms. The Admiralty provided guns, ammunition and powder, and it required the ship owners to keep close and regular accounts of their use. The owners were under orders to co-operate with the Royal Navy, and they were entitled to payment of compensation, according to the size of their ships and the amount of time they were required. For instance, on 28 September 1804 the Navy held a meeting with the owners of 16 hoys at Margate. The Navy then hired the vessels for the defence of the coast. The Navy manned each vessel with a regular Navy man as master and nine men from the Sea Fencibles.

=== Recruitment ===
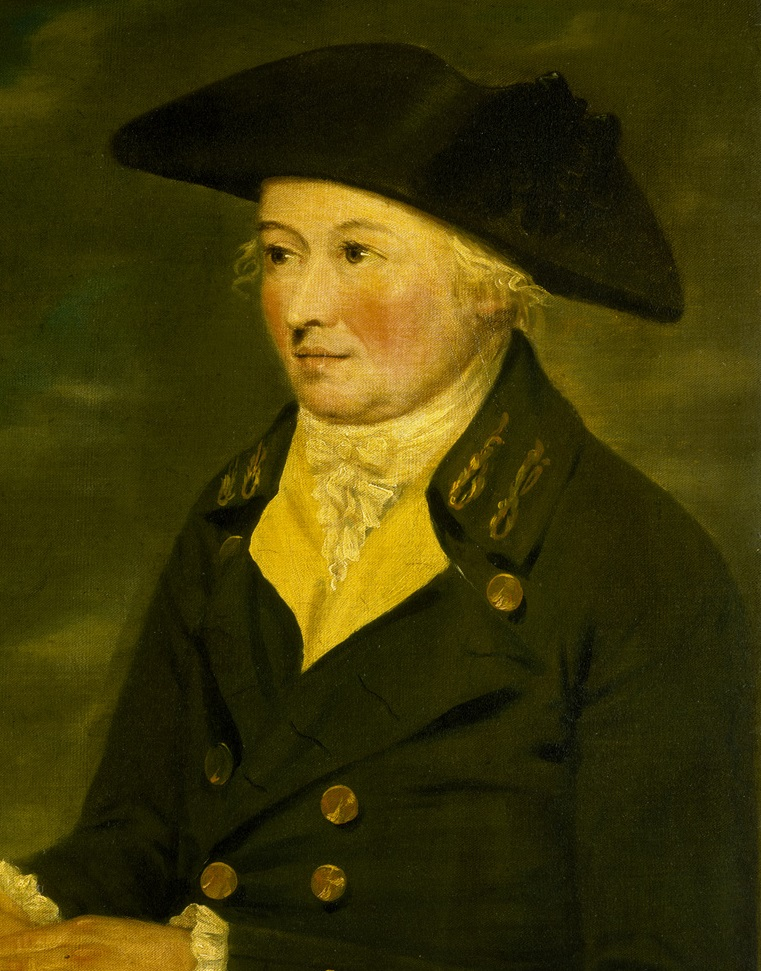
Nathaniel Portlock, the commander of the Dartmouth Sea Fencibles from 1805 to 1807

A newspaper recruiting advert in 1798.

ANY Men willing to enroll themselves as SEA FENCIBLES, to defend the coast against an Enemy, are to apply to Capt. Edge, at Southwold, who commands from Yarmouth to Harwich; Capt. Baker at Aldborough, or Capt. Rillwick at Lowestoft. They are only required to attend one day in the week, to exercise at the pike and guns a few hours, and will be allowed a shilling each on those days, and if called up on actual service, the pay of an able seaman, and Eight-pence a day subsistence.

Sea Fencibles recruitment was brisk with 23,500 volunteers in the first four years. Officer recruitment also proceeded swiftly, particularly among younger captains who lacked the seniority for an ocean-going command. By 1803, one third of Sea Fencibles captains were men promoted to that rank within the preceding twelve months. Sea Fencibles command also offered the prospect of relatively easy service on full pay. For this reason it also appealed to a group of older captains whose Navy careers were near their natural end. The oldest captain, Sir Edmund Nagle, had served at sea for more than three decades before taking command of the Sea Fencibles at Shoreham-by-Sea in 1803.

Home Popham himself was appointed to head up the district between Beachy Head and Deal, the area considered at greatest risk of French invasion. Another Sea Fencible was Francis Austen, a naval captain and future admiral who was the brother of the novelist Jane Austen. He was appointed to raise and organise a corps of Sea Fencibles to defend a strip of the Kentish coast. His base was the Royal Harbour of Ramsgate.

In September 1803, it was reported that all the seafaring men of the city of Gloucester were to enlist in the Sea Fencibles in order to obtain protection from the impress (press gang).

=== Active duty ===
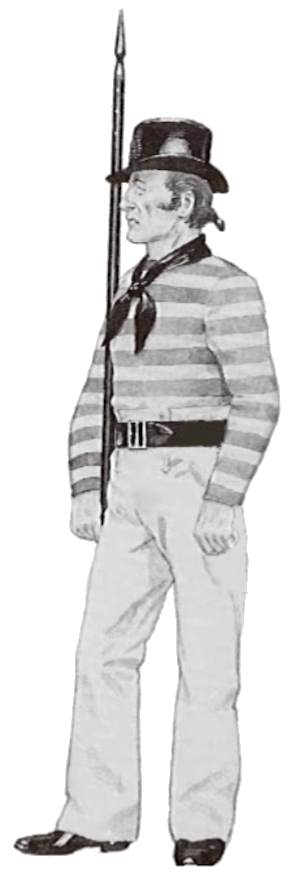
Illustration of a typical Sea Fencible

On 13 November 1798, a French privateer appeared off Hastings. Captain E. H. Columbine of the Sea Fencibles put a number of his men on the cutter Lion, offered by a Mr. Wexham, and set out after the French vessel. They caught up with their quarry after a chase and captured her after "a little firing" that resulted in the death of one Frenchman. The privateer was the Success, of Cherbourg, Nicholas Dubois, master, with four guns and 24 men. She had been out four days without making any captures. Captain Columbine remarked on the "zeal and readiness" of the Hastings men.

A second case occurred on 9 January 1799. The next day Captain Edward Buller, commander of the Sea Fencibles along the coast of Devon, reported that on the previous day, the brig Susannah had left Dartmouth only to fall prey to the French 14-gun privateer Heureux Speculateur. The Brixham Sea Fencibles seeing this take place, took a boat, and armed only with muskets and pikes, succeeded in recapturing the Susannah and her prize crew. Lieutenant Nicholas, with the assistance of Revenue Collector Brooking, who provided small arms and a boat, took another detachment of Sea Fencibles and, accompanied by a boat from the cutter HMS Nimble, set off, unsuccessfully, to capture the privateer.

On 11 March of the same year, the Margate Sea Fencibles were somewhat more successful. When a small cutter was observed boarding two brigs eight or nine miles from the North Foreland, 40 or 50 Sea Fencibles pushed off in three boats and recaptured the two brigs, the privateer having made off. Another case occurred on 13 June 1804. HM hired armed cutter Princess Augusta, under the command of Lieutenant John Tracey, encountered a 14-gun French privateer off Huntcliff. During the engagement, which lasted nearly four hours, the Princess Augusta took several shot near the water line and sustained extensive damage to her rigging. Still, she suffered only three men wounded, though one desperately. The French vessel sheered off on the approach of two schooners manned with Sea Fencibles from Redcar. The French privateer reportedly was under the command of a notorious pirate with the name "Blackman".

The French privateer brig Intrepide, of 16 guns, from Cherbourg, was cruising in sight of Scilly on 13 April 1806 and had taken three vessels on that coast. One of her prizes was the transport Mary, Macarthy, master, from Cork to Portsmouth. The Scilly Sea Fencibles, together with the revenue cutter Providence, Capt. Worsell, recaptured Mary. The Sea Fencibles also acted as a coastguard or lifeboat service. When HMS Brazen wrecked in 1800, the Sea Fencibles attempted a rescue. Similarly, in January 1809, when HMS Pigeon was wrecked at Kingsgate, near Margate, the Sea Fencibles helped rescue the survivors. However, the Navy was not entirely enthusiastic about this role. In late 1804, the Sea Fencibles in Kinsale rescued the crew of a vessel wrecked in the District. Their commander, Commander Terence O'Neill, reimbursed them out of his own pocket, and then applied to the Navy for reimbursement. This was allowed, but William Marsden, First Secretary of the Admiralty, wrote: "But although the conduct of the persons who exerted themselves on this occasion, in saving the lives and property of their fellow creatures is highly meritorious, it has no relation to the service for which they were enrolled, and the precedent, if followed in all other parts where Sea Fencibles are established, would occasion a very heavy expense to the public".

In January 1810, Sea Fencibles from Happisburgh and Winterton used newly issued Manby mortars to effect successful rescues of those on board two vessels driven ashore in a gale. On 3 February 1810, off Newhaven a French privateer lugger took a brig, in response five small boats of Sea Fencibles set off to attempt to recover the brig, outgunned they were unable to do so, however, some were able to board a smack and thereby prevent it being taken also. The same month when it became clear that the threat of invasion by Bonaparte had passed, the Sea-Fencibles were disbanded.

=== River Fencibles ===
In 1798, watermen and other groups of river tradesmen on the River Thames voluntarily formed associations of River Fencibles. Officially established in 1803 as "Corps of River Fencibles of the City of London", to be Captain-Commander Mathias Lucas (1761-1848), Esq. Captains - John Drinkeid, Esq. jun., Henry Grey, Esq, Jeffery Smith, Esq., James Betts, Esq, John Clarkson, Gent., William Chapman, Esq., William Burgess, Esq., Henry Dudin, Esq and lieutenants and ensigns, by 1804 they had uniformed commissioned officers in command.

Members of the Corps escorted the barge carrying the body of Lord Nelson along the Thames in small boats during his state funeral in 1806.

In 1807, River Fencibles sailed to Copenhagen to help bring back some of the Danish vessels captured there after the second Battle of Copenhagen. The Greenwich River Fencibles consisted of a commandant, three captains, six lieutenants, 24 masters, 24 mates, and 157 gunners and privates. The Government provide pikes, but nothing else, so the men defrayed their own expenses. The Greenwich River Fencibles sent two officers and 126 men to Copenhagen.

The City of London, Loyal Greenwich, and Royal Harbour River Fencibles also contributed men to the Walcheren expedition in 1809. The Greenwich River Fencibles alone sent two officers and 130 men on the Walcheren expedition, two of whom were killed. In all, about 300 Fencibles volunteered to serve at Copenhagen and about the same number served on the Walcheren Expedition.

In February 1812, the River Fencibles were called out to assist the Impress. About 200 men were pressed. On Saturday 2 May 1812, the Government came to the resolution of dispensing with the services of the River Fencibles; and accordingly ordered them to be disbanded. The Lord Mayor received an official letter on the subject, which he sent to Commodore Lucas.— On Sunday the corps were assembled in the Corn-market, for the purpose of delivering up their arms. The members thereof not having had any previous intimation from the Government with respect to its intentions, were much surprised as well as dissatisfied.— A warm press afterwards took place on the River, and several of them were picked up. The consequence of losing their protected status as Fencibles meant these men were liable to be pressed for the navy, unsurprisingly most did their utmost to prevent being seized. The Corps was disbanded in 1813.

=== Irish Sea Fencibles ===
By Admiralty Order, 20 Sea Fencible units were established and a network of Martello towers constructed to protect the Irish coastline. The number of men and boats per district varied widely and the British government was concerned about their reliability, especially given the Irish rebellion of 1803 led by Robert Emmet. In 1804, the Irish Sea Fencibles had some 28 gun vessels of various sorts - a brig, three galliots, and the rest sloops. Generally these carried two 18-pounder guns and two 18-pounder carronades. The owners usually provided a crew consisting of four men and a boy, with the plan that Sea Fencibles would augment this cadre when the vessels had to put out to sea.

== Canada ==
There were Sea Fencible units attached to the battalions of St. John, Charlotte and Northumberland counties in New Brunswick during the War of 1812 to protect port facilities in the colony. They were raised among seafaring men in coastal communities and seem to have all disbanded after the war.

From 1833 to 1867, there was a unit of Saint John Sea Fencibles that functioned primarily as an artillery unit. Its officers and men wore naval uniforms (although ratings were not issued uniforms until after the Crimean War).
