= Transport vessels for the British invasion of the Dutch Cape Colony (1805–1806) =

In autumn 1805 a small naval squadron under the orders of Commodore Sir Home Popham escorted a fleet of transports and East Indiamen carrying some 5000 soldiers under the command of Major-general Sir David Baird to attack the Dutch at the Cape of Good Hope. The fleet assembled at Madeira and touched at St. Salvador to replenish supplies. The expedition sailed again on the 26 November, and on 4 January 1806, in the evening, anchored to the west of Robben Island, preparatory to taking the Dutch colony.

The lists below are those that Commodore Home Riggs Popham provided to William Marsden, First Secretary of the Admiralty.

== Vessels sailing for the British East India Company ==
These vessels were carrying the 59th Regiment of Foot and recruits for various regiments in India. After the capture of the Cape these vessels sailed on to India or China.

- Britannia (1772 EIC ship) – lost on the expedition
- Comet (1800 ship)
- Euphrates (1803 EIC ship)
- Europe (1803 EIC ship)
- Glory (1802 ship)
- Jane, Duchess of Gordon (1805 EIC ship)
- Maria (1804 ship)
- Northampton (1801 ship)
- Northumberland (1805 EIC ship)
- Sarah Christiana (1798 ship)
- Streatham (1805 EIC ship)
- Union (1801 ship)
- Sir William Pulteney (1802 ship)
- Varuna (1796 ship)
- William Pitt (1803 ship)
- William Pitt (1805 EIC ship)

After the Dutch Governor Jansens signed a capitulation on 18 January 1806, and the British established control of the Cape Colony, Belliqueux escorted William Pitt, Jane Dutchess of Gordon, Sir William Pulteney, and Comet to Madras. The convoy included Northampton, Streatham, Europe, Union, Glory, and Sarah Christiana.

== Transports ==
Apart from the EIC vessels, the expedition employed a large number of transports specifically for the expedition. These vessels carried the 93rd, 38th, and 24th Regiments of Foot, the Royal Artillery, and dismounted dragoons. The data on burthens and post-invasion disposition comes from Theal.

Vessel	Burthen	Post-invasion disposition
Agnes†	230	21 March convoy to UK with invalids and Dutch prisoners
Amphitrite‡	288	28 February sailed as cartel to Holland
Anacreon (1800 ship)†	448	11 March sailed as cartel with prisoners from Volontaire
Anne	319	Sailed 10 March for England with dispatches
Atlas (1801 South Shields ship)	435	Sailed 13 March as a cartel with the crews of the captured ships Atalanta and Napoleon
Bellona (1782 ship)‡	472	Sailed 28 February as cartel to Holland
Charlotte (1784 ship)	338	11 March sailed as cartel with prisoners from Volontaire
Elisha (or Eliza) Tupper‡	272	Sailed 28 February as cartel to Holland
Elizabeth†	251	Sailed with 21 March convoy to UK with invalids and Dutch prisoners
Fame†	285	Sailed with 21 March convoy to UK with invalids and Dutch prisoners
Francis and Eliza (1782 ship)‡	347	Sailed 28 February as cartel to Holland
Harbinger	365	Sailed 13 March as a cartel with the crews of Atalanta and Napoleon
Harlequin†	220	Sailed with 21 March convoy to UK with invalids and Dutch prisoners
Harriet‡ (or Harriot)	387	Sailed 28 February as cartel to Holland
Indefatigable (1799 ship)†	549	Sailed with 21 March convoy to UK with invalids and Dutch prisoners
Indefatigable (C)†	217	Sailed with 21 March convoy to UK with invalids and Dutch prisoners
Jack	151	Sailed 21 March with dispatches for Barbados
King George		Lost outward bound on the expedition
Majestic	377	Sailed for Madras 9 February with EIC troops to return with rice and wheat for the colony
Melantho	289	Reserved for general service
Messenger†	217	Sailed with 21 March convoy to UK with invalids and Dutch prisoners
Ocean	430	Reserved for general service
Paragon (1800 Whitby ship)	394	Sailed 7 February for Algoa Bay with troops to load lumber for military works
Sea Horse (1782 ship)	293	Sailed 20 January with dispatches for England
Simpson	354	Sailed for Madras 9 February with EIC troops to return with rice and wheat for the colony
Sir John Borlase Warren (1800 ship)‡	360	Sailed 28 February as cartel to Holland
Traveller†	244	Sailed with 21 March convoy to UK with invalids and Dutch prisoners
Triton	443	Reserved for general service
Union	292	Sailed 28 February as cartel to Holland‡
Walker	357	21 March loading with provisions
Wellington	339	Reserved for general service
Whitby	336	Sailed 28 February to India to get grain for the colony
William	447	Sailed for Madras 9 February with EIC troops to return with rice and wheat for the colony
Zephyr	342	21 March loading with artillery and stores for False Bay

- The 17 vessels in this table and the next with "†" by their name sailed back to Great Britain in convoy under escort by now HMS Volontaire.
- The seven vessels with "‡" by their name sailed as cartels, repatriating to Holland the Dutch troops captured at the Cape, and their dependents.

== Other ==
Vessel	Burthen	Role	Post-invasion disposition
Albion (1802 ship)†	201	General baggage and horses	21 March convoy to UK with invalids and Dutch prisoners
Golden Grove†	102	Victualer	21 March convoy to UK with invalids and Dutch prisoners
Juno (1793 ship)	239	Victualer	Sailed 11 March to Plettenberg Bay to load with timber
Sarah†	572	Hospital and medical stores	21 March convoy to UK with invalids and Dutch prisoners
Wilding (1788 ship)†	282	Victualer	21 March convoy to UK with invalids and Dutch prisoners
