= Battle of Blaauwberg =

1806 engagement of the War of the Third Coalition

- Part of the War of the Third Coalition
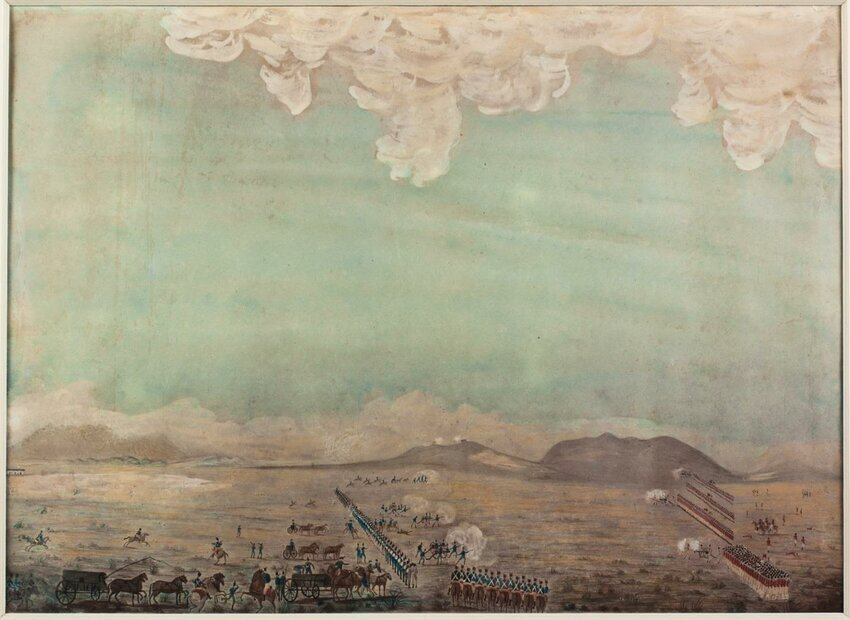
- Painting of the battle
Date	8–18 January 1806
Location	Bloubergstrand, Western Cape, Cape Colony 33°45′22″S 18°27′56″E
Result	British victory
Territorial changes	British occupation of the Dutch Cape Colony

Belligerents
United Kingdom	Batavian Republic: Dutch Cape Colony; France

Commanders and leaders
David Baird; Home Riggs Popham	Jan Willem Janssens

Strength
5,399; 4 ships of the line 2 frigates 3 brigs 9 troopships	3,122; 1 ship of the line 1 frigate

Casualties and losses
15 killed 189 wounded 36 drowned	337–700 killed, wounded, captured or missing 1 ship of the line scuttled 1 frigate scuttled

The Battle of Blaauwberg (also known as the Battle of Cape Town) was a successful British amphibious operation during the War of the Third Coalition which lasted from 8–18 January 1806 and resulted in the capture of the Dutch Cape Colony. After defeating their Batavian opponents, the British signed a treaty under the Treaty Tree in Woodstock, Cape Town which established Britain's control over the Cape Colony. The colony later became a permanent part of the British Empire following the Congress of Vienna that marked the end of the Napoleonic Wars in 1814. Due to establishing permanent British rule over the Cape Colony, the battle would have many ramifications for southern Africa during the nineteenth and twentieth centuries. A bi-centennial commemoration of the battle was held in January 2006.

== Background ==
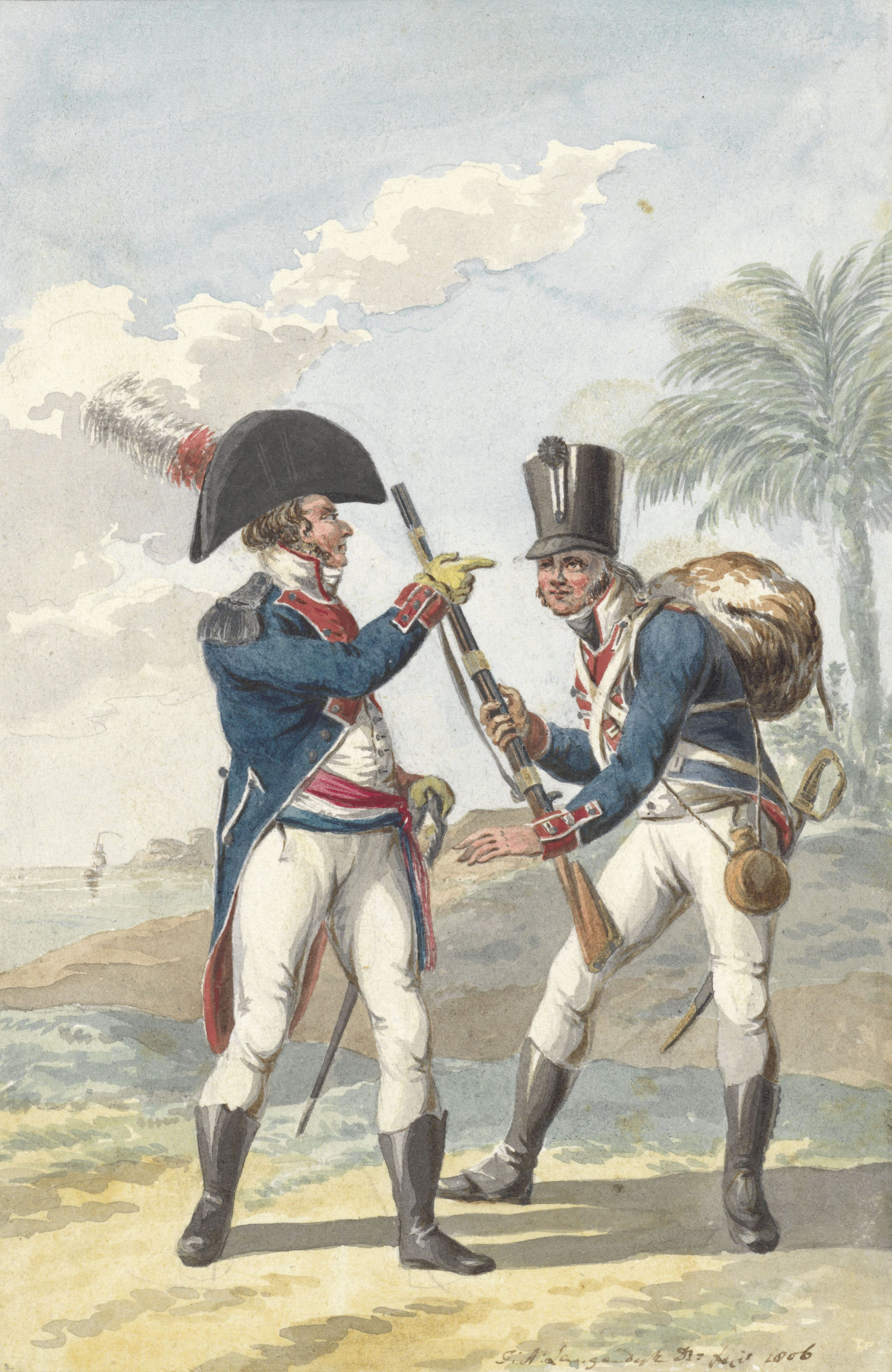
1806 illustration of a Batavian officer and soldier in the Cape Colony

In 1795, the British carried out a successful invasion of the Cape Colony during the War of the First Coalition, capturing the colony from the Dutch East India Company. Following the 1802 Treaty of Amiens and the end of the French Revolutionary Wars, the British handed the Cape Colony back to the newly established Batavian Republic, a French sister republic which replaced the Dutch Republic.

Following Napoleon's rise to power in France and the outbreak of the Napoleonic Wars a year later in 1803, the Cape Colony again became an issue of strategic concern for the British. Britain's economy depended on its vast trade routes, particularly those with British India. The Cape Colony occupied a highly important place at the middle of the sea route between Europe and India and therefore held commercial and military importance. By holding both the Cape Colony, in addition to its possession of Mauritius, the British would be able to dominate maritime affairs in both the Atlantic and Indian Oceans thereby protecting its wartime economy and assisting in the war effort against France.

As the trade routes around the Cape Colony was important to the British, they decided to seize the colony in order to prevent it and nearby trade routes from coming under French control. A British fleet was dispatched to the Cape in July 1805, to forestall French troopships Napoleon had sent to reinforce the Batavian garrison there.

== Order of battle ==
=== Batavian forces ===
The Cape Colony was governed by Lieutenant-General Jan Willem Janssens, who was also commander-in-chief of the colony's military forces. His forces were small in number and of poor quality. Regular forces Janssens commanded during the battle included 764 men of the 22nd Infantry Battalion, 584 men of the 5th Waldeck Battalion, 420 men of the 9th Jagers, 402 men of the 5th Artillery Battalion and 240 French sailors and marines from the beached warships Atlante and Napoleon. Janssens also mustered 305 men of the Hottentot Light Infantry, 183 men of the Swellendam Dragoons and 224 men of the Burgher Militia.

=== British forces ===
The British land forces comprising the invasion force were made up of around 7,000 professional soldiers from established veteran battalions, along with a number of camp followers. All supported by a small naval squadron that included 4 ships of the line, 2 frigates, 3 brigs and a number of transport ships.

Seven infantry battalions from the 24th, 38th, 59th, 71st, 72nd, 83rd Regiments of Foot as well as the 93rd Sutherland Highlanders participated in the invasion and battle. An additional 400 Royal Marines were believed to have been attached to the Highland Brigade. Non-infantry military elements consisted of a small number of Royal Engineers and two squadrons of the 20th Light Dragoons (without horses), in addition to 3 companies of Royal Artillery consisting of 60 men with 6 light field guns and 2 small howitzers (but no draft animals to move them) were also present.

The British naval squadron assembled for the invasion included nine warships and a number of transport vessels under the command of Cmdre. Home Riggs Popham, assembled from two fleets out of Cork and Falmouth. Popham took the 64-gun HMS Diadem as his flagship, his warships included the 64-gun ships HMS Raisonnable and HMS Belliqueux, 50-gun HMS Diomede, 38-gun HMS Leda, 32-gun HMS Narcissus, 18-gun HMS Espoir, 14-gun HMS Encounter and HMS Protector. The East India Company ships Dutchess of Gordon, Sir William Pulteney, Europe, Streatham, Union, Comet, Northampton, Glory, and William Pitt ferried the invasion force in their holds.

== Campaign ==
Location of events during the invasion including the site of the British landing, the site of the battle, and the two surrender locations.

The British force, under David Baird, departed England in August 1805. The first British warship reached the Cape on Christmas Eve 1805, and attacked two supply ships off the Cape Peninsula.

The government instructed Baird that the colony would be "defended by not more than 1500 Regular Troops, not of the best description; and that the Militia and Inhabitants look with anxiety for the Arrival of a British Force". Although Baird received two more communiques, the second providing an estimate of 1500–2000 regular enemy troops, and a 3rd warning of the possibility of 1000–1200 French troops arriving to the cape, carried by French ships that slipped out of Rochefort.

By July, a British officer who visited the cape as a passenger of a Danish ship, provided Baird with more fresh eyewitness estimates, communicating to him to expect 2000 European Troops, 800 Khoekhoe and roughly 200 cavalry and artillerists, combined with earlier reports of French troops potentially arriving in the cape from Rochefort, this brought the total estimate of the defending force of the Cape to 4,500. Later still, A Royal Navy Captain named Woodruff sent a letter providing estimates from late July, indicating "1500 Regulars, or thereabouts, and 1500 Khoekhoe, free blacks, and Burghers of every description" although this letter arrived in Britain after Baird has already departed for South Africa. Janssens placed his garrison on alert after receiving reports of the upcoming British invasion. When the main fleet sailed into Table Bay on 4 January 1806, he mobilised the garrison, declared martial law, and called up the militia.

=== British landing ===
After a delay caused by rough seas, two British infantry brigades, under the command of Baird, landed at Melkbosstrand, north of Cape Town, on 6 and 7 January. Popham ordered a small merchantman to be scuttled at Losperd's Bay to form a breakwater, and Baird started landing his troops. 36 men of the highland 93rd foot drowned during the landing operation when their boat capsized, and some dragoons from the Swellendam Burghers skirmished with them to delay the landing, (Janssens did not want to fight a battle on the shoreline, fearing bombardment by the British ships' broadsides). Janssens moved his forces to intercept them. He had decided that "victory could be considered impossible, but the honour of the fatherland demanded a fight". His intention was to attack the British on the beach and then to withdraw to the interior, where he hoped to hold out until the French troopships arrived.

However, on the morning of 8 January, while Janssens's columns were still slowly moving through the veld, Baird's brigades began their march to Cape Town, and reached the slopes of Blaauwberg Hill (now known as the Tygerberg Hills), a few kilometres ahead of Janssens. Janssens halted and formed a line across the veld.

=== Battle ===
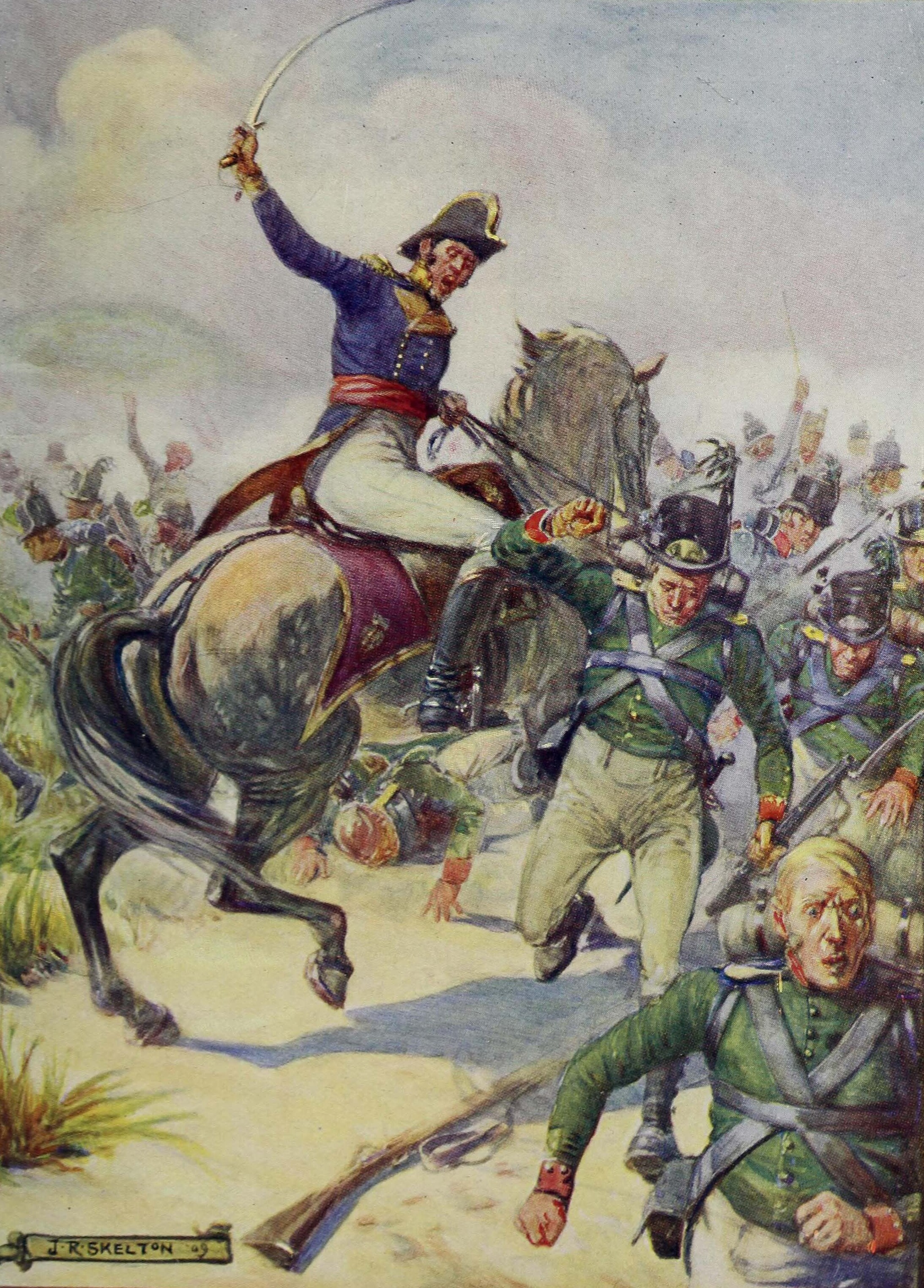
General Janssens at the Battle of Blaauwberg trying to prevent the rout of Batavian troops, which was the battle's turning point.

The battle began at sunrise, with exchanges of artillery fire. These were followed by an advance by Janssens's militia cavalry, and volleys of musket fire from both sides. Janssens' hired regiment of mercenary regulars out of Waldeck, placed at the centre of his line, fled from the field when the British 71st foot reached within 90 meters of them, without firing a single shot, exposing the Batavian centre. The two battalions to its flanks (the 22nd line and 9th Batavian rifles) began promptly to collapse, though Janssens managed to rally some of his troops and keep them at the fray.

The 200 French sailors and marines, despite having their flanks exposed due to the Batavian line routing, fought ferociously and resisted the attack longer than the rest. 10 pieces of foot artillery placed in the centre, manned by 54 Javanese artillerists and 104 Mozambican slaves, were firing at the advancing Highlanders. A gallant charge of the 71st Highlanders captured the guns after a ferocious defence from the Javanese artillerists. As Janssens' centre began collapsing, he ordered a withdrawal, which his regulars promptly commenced, but his militia and auxiliary troops did not carry out immediately, engaging the British in a fighting withdrawal before being forced to flee due to the increasing pressure of the British attack.

Janssens began the battle with 2,049 troops and was bombarded, and lost either 337 or 353 in casualties and desertions Baird gave the tally as "reputed to exceed 700 Men killed and wounded", though he admitted implicit uncertainty of the enemy's total losses. Baird began the battle with 5,399 men, and his troops suffered 204 casualties in the form of 189 wounded and 15 killed.

=== British consolidation ===
From Blaauwberg, Janssens moved inland to a farm in the Tygerberg area, and from there his troops moved to Elands Kloof in the Hottentots Holland Mountains, about 50 km from Cape Town.

The British forces reached the outskirts of Cape Town on 9 January. To spare the town and its civilian population from attack, the commandant of Cape Town, Lieutenant-Colonel Hieronymus Casimir von Prophalow, sent out a white flag. He handed over the outer fortifications to Baird, and terms of surrender were negotiated later in the day.

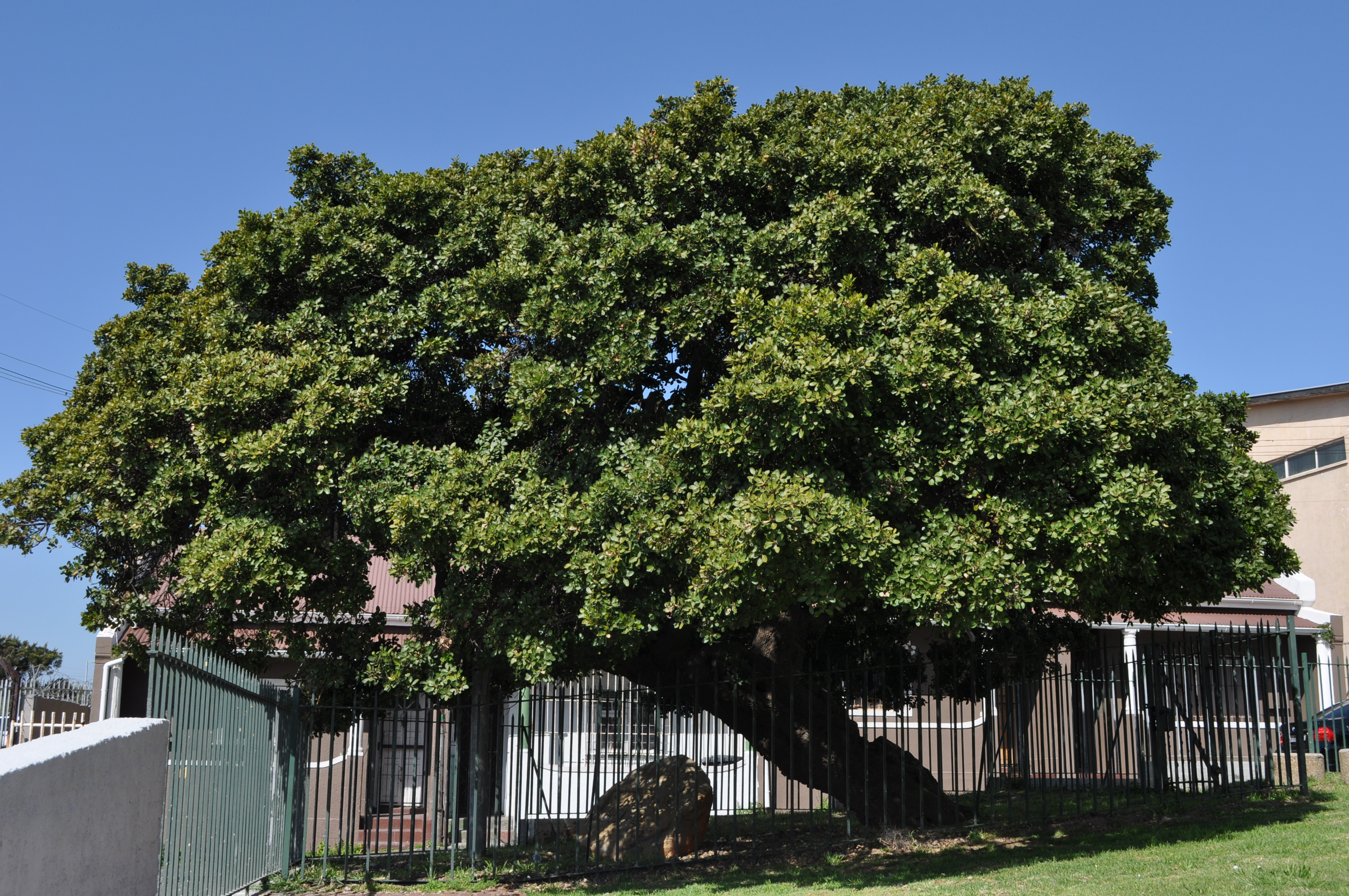
The Treaty Tree where the articles of capitulation for the capture of Cape Town were signed on 10 January 1806.

The formal Articles of Capitulation for the town and the Cape Peninsula were signed the following afternoon, 10 January, at a cottage in Papendorp (now the suburb of Woodstock) which became known as "Treaty Cottage." Although the cottage has long since been demolished, Treaty Street still commemorates the event. The tree under which they signed remains to this day.

== Aftermath ==
Janssens had not yet surrendered himself and his remaining troops. He was following his plan to hold out for as long as he could, in the hope that the French troopships for which he had been waiting for months would arrive and save him. He had only 1,238 men with him, and 211 deserted in the days that followed. Janssens held out in the mountains for a further week. Baird sent Brigadier General William Beresford to negotiate with him, and the two generals conferred at a farm belonging to Gerhard Croeser near the Hottentots-Holland Mountains on 16 January without reaching agreement. After further consideration, and consultation with his senior officers and advisers, Janssens decided that "the bitter cup must be drunk to the bottom". He agreed to capitulate, and the final Articles of Capitulation were signed on 18 January.

Uncertainty reigns as to where the Articles of Capitulation were signed. For many years it has been claimed that it was the Goedeverwachting estate (where a copy of the treaty is on display), but more recent research, published in Dr Krynauw's book Beslissing by Blaauwberg suggests that Croeser's farm (now the Somerset West golf course) may have been the venue. An article published in the 1820s by the then resident clergyman of the Stellenbosch district, Dr Borcherds, also points towards Croeser's farm. The terms of the capitulation were reasonably favourable to the Batavian soldiers and citizens of the Cape. Janssens and the Batavian officials and troops were sent back to the Netherlands in March.

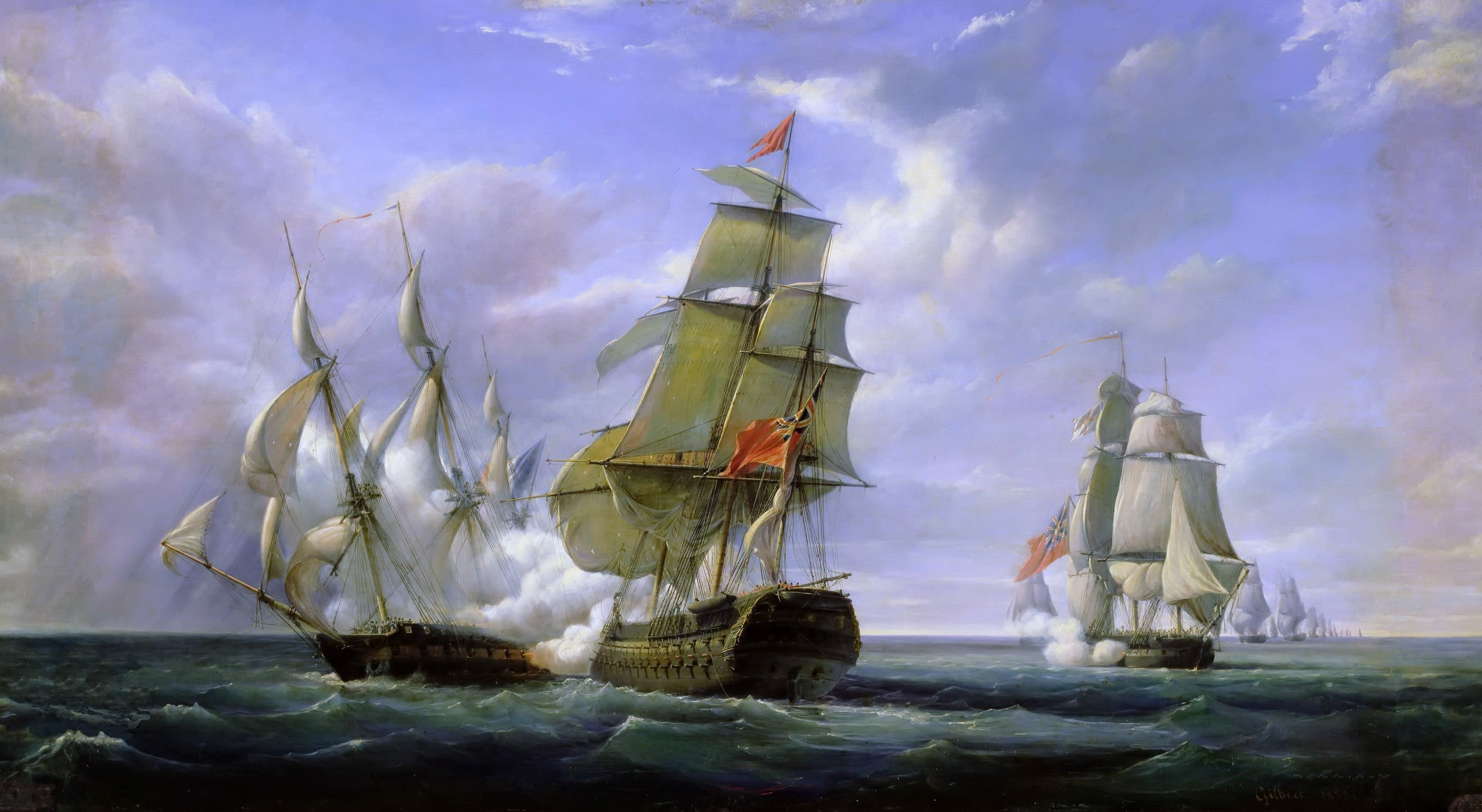
The action of 21 April 1806 off the coast of Natal that resulted in a French frigate unwittingly sailing into the newly hostile Simon's Town harbour after the capture of the Cape Colony.

Following the action of 21 April 1806 off the coast of Natal, the 40-gun French frigate, Cannonière, was nearly captured due to her crews outdated belief that the colony was still held by the Dutch. After dropping anchor near Simon's Town on 29 April 1806 the captain took a rowboat to shore, only to be fired upon once landing and the Dutch flags exchanged for British flags. The captain and crew narrowly escaped without incurring any casualties and the ship returned to the French colony at Reunion island. The British forces occupied the Cape from 13 August 1814, when the Netherlands ceded the colony to Britain as a permanent possession. It remained a British colony until it was incorporated into the Union of South Africa on 31 May 1910.

== Articles of Capitulation ==
=== Cape Town articles of capitulation ===
Summary of the Articles of Capitulation signed by Lt Col Von Prophalow, Maj Gen Baird and Cdre Popham on 10 January 1806:

- Cape Town, the Castle, and circumjacent fortifications were surrendered to Great Britain;
- the garrison became prisoners of war, but officers who were colonists or married to colonists could remain at liberty as long as they behaved themselves;
- officers who were to be repatriated to Europe would be paid up to the date of embarkation and would be transported at British expense;
- all French subjects in the colony must return to Europe;
- inhabitants of Cape Town who had borne arms [i.e. burgher militiamen] could return to their occupations;
- all private property would remain free and untouched;
- all public property was to be inventoried and handed over;
- the burghers and inhabitants would retain all their rights and privileges, including freedom of worship;
- paper money, mostly Rixdollars, in circulation would remain current;
- the Batavian government property that was to be handed over would serve as security for the paper money;
- prisoners of war would not be pressed into British service or be forced to enlist against their will;
- troops would not be quartered on the citizens of Cape Town;
- the two ships which had been sunk in Table Bay were to be raised by those who had sunk them, repaired, and handed over.

=== Batavian army articles of capitulation ===
Summary of the Articles of Capitulation signed by Lt Gen Janssens and Brig Gen Beresford on 18 January 1806 and ratified by Maj Gen Baird on 19 January:

- the colony and its dependencies were surrendered to Great Britain;
- the Batavian troops were to move to Simon's Town, with their guns, arms, baggage, and all the honours of war – the officers could retain their swords and horses, but all arms, treasure, public property, and horses were to be handed over;
- the Batavian troops would not be considered to be prisoners;
- Janssens' Hottentot (sic) troops were also to march to Simon's Town, after which they could either return home or join the British forces;
- the British commander-in-chief [Baird] would decide the position of those Batavian troops who were already prisoners of war;
- the British government would bear the expense of the Batavian troops' subsistence until they embarked;
- the Batavian troops would be transported to a port in the Batavian Commonwealth;
- sick men who could not be transported would stay behind, at British expense, and be sent to Holland after they had recovered;
- the rights and privileges allowed to the citizens of Cape Town would also apply to the rest of the colony, except that the British could quarter troops on residents of the country districts;
- once embarked, the Batavian troops would be treated the same as British troops were when on board transport ships;
- Janssens would be allowed to send a despatch to Holland, and the British commanders would assist in forwarding it;
- decisions regarding the continuation of agricultural plans by one Baron van Hogendorp would be left to the future British government;
- any matter arising out of the Articles of Capitulation would be decided justly and honourably without preference to either party.

== See also ==
- Military history of South Africa
- Bloubergstrand, Cape Town

== Sources ==
- Lt Gen Janssens's Report (Cape Archives: ref VC80)
- Krynauw, Dawid W. (1999). Beslissing by Blouberg: triomf en tragedie van die stryd om die Kaap [Decision at Blouberg: Triumph and Tragedy of the struggle for the Cape] (in Afrikaans). Tafelberg. ISBN 978-0-624-03746-0.
- Theal, GM (1897). Records of the Cape Colony 1793–1831. London: Gov't of The Cape Colony.
