= Union (1801 ship) =

History

United Kingdom
- Name: Union
- Owner: 1802:White & Co.; 1803:William Marshall; 1805:Henry Bonham
- Launched: 13 July 1801
- Fate: Wrecked December 1815 or early 1816

General characteristics
- Tons burthen: 722, or 723, or 731, or 748, or 74838/94, or 754 (bm)
- Length: Overall:132 ft 10 in (40.5 m); Keel:105 ft 3 in (32.1 m)
- Beam: 35 ft 11 1/2 in (11.0 m)
- Depth of hold: 12 ft 5 in (3.8 m)
- Complement: 1805:60; 1807:60; 1811:70; 1813:75
- Armament: 1805:14 × 12&9 + 9 swivel guns; 1807:4 × 9-pounder guns + 10 × 12-pounder carronades; 1811:14 × 12&9-pounder guns; 1813:14 × 9&12-pounder guns
- Notes: Three decks

Union was launched at Calcutta in 1801. She sailed to England and then made five voyages as an East Indiaman for the British East India Company (EIC), between 1805 and 1814. She was wrecked in late 1815 or early 1816.

== Career ==
Union sailed to England soon after her launch.

The EIC announced the sale on 30 April 1802 of 1,300 bags of rice that had come from Bengal on Georgiana in private trade. The sale of Georgiana's rice was to follow the sale that day of 27,000 bags of rice for the EIC's account that the East Indiamen Ganges, Cornwallis, Medway, and Union had brought.

She appears in Lloyd's Register in 1802 with Marshall, master, White & Co., owner, and trade London–India. She was admitted to the Registry of Great Britain on 21 May 1802.

On Union's return to Bengal, Captain William Marshall purchased Sir William Pulteney, which he tendered to the EIC for a voyage to England. The EIC accepted the tender, and then accepted Union too, which Marshall now owned. Marshall appointed his First Mate on Union, William Stokoe, to command of her, and took command of Sir William Pulteney.

=== EIC voyage #1 (1804) ===
On Union's first voyage for the EIC Captain William Stokoe sailed from Calcutta on 17 January 1804, bound for England. Union was at Saugor on 8 March. She sailed in company with Sir William Pulteney and reached St Helena on 28 June.

Union sailed from St Helena on 9 July in company with Sir William Pulteney and a third EIC "extra" ship, Eliza Ann. The Governor of St Helena, Colonel Robert Patton, permitted them to sail without escort. (Had he held them until a convoy had formed, the EIC would have been liable for hefty demurrage charges.) Captain Mungo Gilmore, of Eliza Ann, was the senior captain and Patton appointed him to command the group.

At daylight on 22 August, the Indiamen sighted a French privateer brig that sailed towards them and engaged Union, which was the leading ship. The engagement lasted about 20 minutes and the French vessel surrendered at 48°5′N 13°0′W after Eliza Ann and Sir William Pulteney came up. The privateer was Venus, and she was armed with sixteen 4, 8, & 12-pounder guns. She had a crew of 73 men (of whom five were away on prizes), under the command of Lieutenant Pierre Henri Nicholas Benamy of the French Navy. In the engagement Venus had lost one man killed and had two men seriously wounded. (Union had two men wounded.) She also had on board five men from a prize crew that HMS Wasp had put on a Spanish vessel that Venus had recaptured. The Indiamen divided up the French prisoners among them. The next evening, west of Scilly, Venus parted from the Indiamen and headed for a British port. (Note: French records show Venus as a brig built at Nantes in 1799-1800 and commissioned as a privateer in August 1803. She supposedly was armed with ten 4-pounder and two 2-pounder guns, and two 8-pounder carronades. On her cruise in 1803 she was under the command of Captain Hamon.)

Sir William Pulteney, Eliza Ann, and Union arrived at The Downs on 2 September. Venus arrived at Deal on 24 September. (Note: Venus may have become the whaler Venus that Daniel Bennett & Son employed between 1805 and 1811.)

William Marshall apparently sold both Sir William Pulteney and Union in England. The EIC then engaged Union as an extra ship for four voyages. At the time they had her repaired by Brent and measured. (It also engaged Sir William Pulteney for six voyages.)

=== EIC voyage #2 (1805–1807) ===
Captain Arthur Muter acquired a letter of marque on 6 July 1805. He sailed from Falmouth on 11 August, bound for Madras and Bengal. Union was at Cork on 1 September and Madeira on 29 September.

Union was one of the EIC vessels that were part of the expedition under General Sir David Baird and Admiral Sir Home Riggs Popham that would in 1806 capture the Dutch Cape Colony. They would carry supplies and troops to the Cape, and then continue on their voyages.

Union reached the Cape of Good Hope by January 1806.

After the Dutch Governor Jansens signed a capitulation on 18 January 1806, and the British established control of the Cape Colony, HMS Belliqueux escorted the East Indiamen William Pitt, Jane, Duchess of Gordon, Sir William Pulteney, Comet to Madras. The convoy included the Northampton, Streatham, Europe, Union, Glory, and Sarah Christiana.

By April Union was at Madras. At Madras, the captains of the eight East Indiamen in the convoy joined together to present Captain George Byng, of Belliqueux, a piece of silver plate worth £100 as a token of appreciation for his conduct while they were under his orders. Byng wrote his thank you letter to them on 24 April.

By July Union was at Calcutta. She returned to her moorings on 15 April 1807.

=== EIC voyage #3 (1807–1808) ===
Captain Frederick Gaillard acquired a letter of marque on 27 July 1807. He sailed from Portsmouth on 15 September 1807, bound for Madras and Bombay. Union was at Madeira on 27 September. She was reported well on 28 November at 30°10′S 5°20′W. She was in convoy with Northampton, Sarah Christiana, Ann, Diana, Sir William Pulteney, and Glory. Their escort was the 64-gun third rate HMS Monmouth.

Union reached Madras on 16 February 1808. She arrived at Bombay on 7 April. Homeward bound, she reached St Helena on 30 September, and arrived at the Downs on 12 December.

=== EIC voyage #4 (1809–1810) ===
Captain Gaillard sailed from Portsmouth on 7 July 1809, bound for Bombay. Union was at Madeira on 19 July and arrived at Bombay on 24 November. Homeward bound, she was at Point de Galle on 20 February 1810. She reached St Helena on 3 May and arrived at The Downs on 6 July.

=== EIC voyage #5 (1811–1812) ===
Captain James Fairfax replaced Gaillard, who had resigned because of ill health. Fairfax acquired a letter of marque on 15 March 1811. However, Union sailed from Portsmouth on 12 March, bound for St Helena and Bengal. Union reached St Helena on 30 May, and arrived at Diamond Harbour on 18 September. Homeward bound, she was at Saugor on 27 October, and left on 16 December. She reached St Helena on 4 March 1812 and arrived at The Downs on 15 May.

The EIC then engaged Union for a fifth voyage.

=== EIC voyage #6 (1813–1814) ===
Captain William Younghusband acquired a letter of marque on 19 February 1813. He sailed from Portsmouth on 20 April 1813, bound for Madras and Bengal. Union was at Madeira on 13 May and reached Madras on 6 September. She arrived at Diamond Harbour on 15 October and Calcutta on 21 October. Homeward bound, she was at Saugor on 9 December and left on 5 January 1814. She reached Madras on 13 January, the Cape on 28 March, and St Helena on 19 May. She arrived at The Downs on 6 August.

Union returned to Calcutta. She was sold there late in 1816, and Younghusband and his crew were paid off.

== Fate ==
Although it is clear that Union foundered, there is disagreement over when and where. Part of the problem is that Union was a common name, and several vessels by that name were lost in 1815 in the East Indies. By one report Union foundered in the Indian Ocean in November 1815. A second report has Union, Barker, master, from Bengal to Batavia, Netherlands East Indies and an English port, lost around November 1815, about a month after leaving Bengal. By a third account she was lost the same year, but at Enggano Island, off Sumatra. An account of her loss links Union, Barker, master, with Enggano.

Union, Captain Barker, left Bengal in December 1815, bound for Batavia, and nothing was heard of her for some 16 months. Eventually a crewman arrived at Fort Marlborough and reported that she had wrecked on Enggano. Many of her crew remained on the wreck and died. Her master, three officers, two gunners, one European passenger, and several other people had succeeded in getting to shore. There the inhabitants took them prisoner, stripped them naked, divided them into three groups, and put them to hard labour. The ship Good Hope, with a surgeon and a party of troops had been dispatched from Fort Marlborough to rescue the prisoners.

Another account states that the seaman who escaped was a native of Batavia, and that he escaped with two lascars. He reported that about 50 men had survived the wrecking. The escapees stole two canoes that they tied together and succeeded in reaching Crooe, (Note: Krui 5.174154°S 103.931930°E, about seven miles SE of Pisang Island.) from where they were forwarded to Fort Marlborough, where they arrived in January 1817. The rescue party in Good Hope traded a variety of articles with the inhabitants for the captives.

Yet another account gives the name of Good Hope's master as John Napier. It states that Barker, his officers, and most of the crew died from the treatment they received.
