= HMS Diomede (1798) =

British Naval Warship

History

Great Britain
- Name: HMS Diomede
- Ordered: 9 December 1790
- Builder: Deptford Dockyard
- Laid down: October 1792
- Launched: 17 January 1798
- Commissioned: March 1798
- Renamed: Built as Firm; Renamed Diomede on 29 December 1797
- Fate: Broken Up August 1815

General characteristics
- Class & type: Diomede-class ship of the line
- Tons burthen: 1,122 53/94 (bm)
- Length: 151 ft 1.5 in (46.1 m) (gundeck); 124 ft 7 7/8 in (38.0 m) (keel)
- Beam: 41 ft 1 3/4 in (12.5 m)
- Depth of hold: 17 ft 7 in (5.4 m)
- Sail plan: Full-rigged ship
- Complement: 343
- Armament: Lower gundeck: 22 × 24-pounder guns; Upper gundeck: 22 × 12-pounder guns; QD: 4 × 6-pounder guns; Fc: 2 × 6-pounder guns

HMS Diomede was a 50-gun fourth-rate ship of the line of the Diomede class of the Royal Navy. She was launched in 1798.

== Service history ==
She was commissioned in March 1798 under Captain Charles Elphinstone, and deployed to the North Sea. On 6 December 1798 she sailed for the Cape of Good Hope. On 24 March 1800 a heavy gale hit Cape Town capsizing and sinking USS Essex's launch, the crew was saved with difficulty by her barge. From December 1802 she was commanded by Captain Samuel Mottley, and was the flagship of Rear Admiral Sir James Saumarez from June 1803 for the next three years. In January 1804 she was commanded by Captain Hugh Downman (as Mottley had returned to Britain aboard Leopard), and deployed to the Channel Islands and the North Sea. In April 1806 she was commanded by Commander Joseph Edmonds, and was in Popham's squadron at the Cape of Good Hope, then participated in the River Plate Expedition, once more commanded by Downman, then was paid off in June 1807.

Diomede was refitted at Portsmouth from September to November 1807, having been recommissioned in August 1807 under Captain Philip Dumaresque, who thereafter commanded Victory. In 1808 she was commanded by Captain John Sykes, and was the flagship of Rear Admiral Sir Edmund Nagle at Guernsey. In 1809 she was commanded by Captain Hugh Cook for the next two years. She sailed on 22 April 1809 with a convoy to Saint Helena, and thereafter to the East Indies.

From June to September 1812, she was refitted at Chatham as a 26-gun troopship, and was recommissioned in October 1812 under Captain Charles Fabian. On 30 March 1813 the 2nd Royal Marine Battalion embarked on the ships HMS Romulus, HMS Diomede, HMS Nemesis, and HMS Fox set sail on 7 April, and arrived in Bermuda on 29 May 1813.

In 1814 Diomede was commanded by Hugh Pigot until October, and thereafter by Captain George Kippen. The boats and some of the complement of the Diomede participated in the Battle of Lake Borgne in December 1814. In 1821 the survivors of the flotilla shared in the distribution of head-money arising from the capture of the American gun-boats and sundry bales of cotton. (Note: A first-class share of the prize money was worth £34 12s 9 1/4d; a sixth-class share, that of an ordinary seaman, was worth 7s 10 3/4d.)

The Diomede arrived at Portsmouth on 31 May 1815 and paid off. On 7 July 1815, Diomede was ordered to become a provisions depot vessel at Sheerness, but upon inspection was found to be too decayed so was broken up in August 1815.

=== Medal ===
In 1847 the Admiralty initiated the Naval General Service Medal. The clasps covered a variety of actions, from boat service to single-ship actions, to larger naval engagements, including major fleet actions. The engagement at Lake Borgne was deemed a boat service worthy enough of recognition by a clasp, and appears on the list of clasps for boat service during the War of 1812. The Admiralty issued a clasp (or bar) marked "14 Dec. Boat Service 1814" to surviving combatants who claimed the clasp. (Note: The 'Names of Ships for which Claims have been proved' are as follows: warships Tonnant, Norge, Royal Oak, Ramillies, Bedford, Armide, Cydnus, Trave, Seahorse, Sophie, Meteor; troopships Gorgon, Diomede, Alceste, Belle Poule) This was the largest Boat Action for which the Naval General Service Medal was granted. In all, 205 survivors claimed it.

== Bibliography ==
- Hayward; Birch; Bishop (2006). British Battles and Medals (7th ed.). London: Spink. ISBN 1-902040-77-5.
- James, William (1902) [1837]. The naval history of Great Britain (1805–1809). Vol. 4 (New six volume ed.). London: Macmillan.
- Marshall, John (1827). "Cook, Hugh" . Royal Naval Biography. Vol. sup, part 1. London: Longman and Company. pp. 160–162.
- Marshall, John (1828). "Fabian, Charles Montague" . Royal Naval Biography. Vol. sup, part 2. London: Longman and Company. p. 268.
- Marshall, John (1829). "Kippen, George" . Royal Naval Biography. Vol. sup, part 3. London: Longman and Company. p. 401.
- Marshall, John (1825). "Mottley, Samuel" . Royal Naval Biography. Vol. 2, part 2. London: Longman and Company. pp. 684–685.
- Winfield, Rif (2008). British Warships in the Age of Sail 1793–1817: Design, Construction, Careers and Fates. Barnsley: Seaforth Publishing. ISBN 978-1-84415-717-4.
