= Sir William Pulteney (1802 ship) =

19th century english ship

History

United Kingdom
- Name: Sir William Pulteney
- Namesake: Sir William Pulteney, 5th Baronet
- Owner: 1802:William Marshall; EIC voyages #2-7:John Locke
- Builder: Gillett & Blackmore, Calcutta
- Launched: October 1802 (Note: The East-India register and directory too gives a year of 1802, as does Phipps. Hackman gives a date of 23 December 1803, however it is not clear what this date represents. It may be the date on which William Marshall purchased her.)
- Fate: Sold 1817

General characteristics
- Tons burthen: 509, or 565, or 609, or 60953/94 (bm)
- Length: Overall:123 ft 8 in (37.7 m); Keel:98 ft 8 in (30.1 m)
- Beam: 32 ft 10 in (10.0 m)
- Depth of hold: 16 ft 10 in (5.1 m)
- Complement: 55 men
- Armament: 12 guns
- Notes: Two decks

Sir William Pulteney was launched in 1803, at Calcutta as a country ship (a ship that traded only east of the Cape of Good Hope.) She sailed to England on a voyage for the British East India Company (EIC) and her owner sold her there. The EIC then engaged her as an "extra ship" for six voyages as an East Indiaman to India and back. She was sold in 1817.

== Career ==
William Marshall, captain and owner of Union, purchased Sir William Pulteney in 1803, after his return to Bengal from England in Union. The Government had advertised for tenders of vessels to carry cargoes to England but had specified that the vessels be no larger than 600 tons (bm), and Union was over 700. Marshall tendered Sir William Pulteney and the EIC accepted his tender. It could not get sufficient vessels and then accepted Union as well. Marshall took command of Sir William Pulteney and promoted his first mate from Union, William Stokoe, to command her.

=== EIC voyage #1 (1804–1805) ===
Captain John Marshall sailed from Kolkata on 19 January 1804. Sir William Pulteney was at Saugor on 24 January, and left on 8 March, together with Union. She reached St Helena on 25 June.

Sir William Pulteney sailed from St Helena on 9 July, in company with Union and the EIC "extra" ship Eliza Ann. The Governor of St Helena, Colonel Robert Patton permitted them to sail without escort. (Had he held them until a convoy had formed, the EIC would have been liable for hefty demurrage charges.) Captain Mungo Gilmore, of Eliza Ann, was the senior captain and Patton appointed him to command the group.

At daylight on 22 August, the Indiamen sighted a French privateer brig that sailed towards them and engaged Union, which was the leading ship. The engagement lasted about 20 minutes and the French vessel surrendered at 48°5′N 13°0′W after Eliza Ann and Sir William Pulteney came up. The privateer was Venus, and she was armed with sixteen 4, 8, & 12-pounder guns. She had a crew of 73 men (of whom five were away on prizes), under the command of Lieutenant Pierre Henri Nicholas Benamy of the French Navy. In the engagement Venus had lost one man killed and had two men seriously wounded. She also had on board five men from a prize crew that HMS Wasp had put on a Spanish vessel that Venus had recaptured. The next evening, west of Scilly, Venus parted from the Indiamen and headed for a British port; the French prisoners remained with the Indiamen. Sir William Pulteney took on 27.

Sir William Pulteney, Eliza Ann, and Union arrived at The Downs on 2 September. Venus arrived at Deal on 24 September.

Marshall sold Sir William Pulteney. She was admitted to the Registry of Great Britain on 28 November.

Barnard repaired her in 1805 and the EIC had her measured. On 2 February 1805, Barnard submitted to the Court of Directors a bill for repairs and stores of £863 16s 4d.

The EIC accepted Sir William Pulteney as an extra ship on 19 February 1805, at a peace time freight rate of £15 4s per ton for 600 tons (bm), plus a war contingency rate of £12 per ton on her first voyage. The term of the engagement was for six voyages.

=== EIC voyage #2 (1805–1807) ===
Sir William Pulteney was one of the EIC vessels that were part of the expedition under General Sir David Baird and Admiral Sir Home Riggs Popham that would in 1806 capture the Dutch Cape Colony. They would carry supplies and troops to the Cape, and then continue on their voyages. Sir William Pulteney was ultimately bound for Bombay and Bengal.

Captain Henry Christopher was appointed to command Sir William Pulteney on 24 April 1805, and sailed her from Cork on 31 August. She was at Madeira on 30 September. She and the fleet were at St Salvador Bay on 12 November and the Cape of Good Hope on 6 January 1806.

After the Dutch Governor Jansens signed a capitulation on 18 January 1806, and the British established control of the Cape Colony, HMS Belliqueux escorted the East Indiamen William Pitt, Jane, Duchess of Gordon, and Comet to Madras. The convoy included Sir William Pulteney, Northampton, Streatham, Europe, Union, Glory, and Sarah Christiana.

At Madras, the captains of the eight East Indiamen in the convoy joined to present Captain George Byng, of Belliqueux, a piece of silver plate worth £100 as a token of appreciation for his conduct while they were under his orders. Byng wrote his thank you letter to them on 24 April.

Sir William Pulteney reached Bombay on 8 May, and Saugor on 10 July. She arrived at Calcutta on 15 July. Homeward bound, she was at Culpee on 23 August, and Saugor on 20 September. She was at Madras on 9 October, and the Cape again on 30 December. She reached St Helena on 23 January, and arrived at The Downs on 12 April.

=== EIC voyage #3 (1807–1808) ===
Barnard billed the EIC on 6 June 1807, for £1,174 10s 2d for repairs to Sir William Pulteney, and stores.

Captain Christopher sailed from Portsmouth on 15 September 1807, bound for Madras and Bombay. Sir William Pulteney was reported well on 28 November, at 30°10′S 5°20′W. She was in convoy with Northampton, Sarah Christiana, Ann, Union, Diana, and Glory. Their escort was the 64-gun third rate HMS Monmouth.

Sir William Pulteney arrived at Madras on 16 February 1808. She reached Tellicherry on 17 March and arrived at Bombay on 7 April. She visited Surat on 30 April, and returned to Bombay on 3 May. Homeward bound, she was at the Cape on 18 September, reached St Helena on 19 October, and arrived at The Downs on 11 December.

=== EIC voyage #4 (1809–1810) ===
Barnard billed the EIC on 17 February 1809 for £771 11s 5d for repairs to Sir William Pulteney, and stores.

Captain Christopher sailed from Portsmouth on 7 July 1809. Sir William Pulteney arrived at Calcutta on 13 December. Homeward bound, she was at Culpee on 1 February 1810, Kedgeree on 23 February, and Saugor on 11 March. She reached St Helena on 24 June, and arrived at The Downs on 5 September.

=== EIC voyage #5 (1811–1812) ===
Barnard billed the EIC on 12 November 1810 for £1851 10s 3d for repairs to Sir William Pulteney, and stores.

Captain Christopher sailed from Torbay on 12 May 1811, bound for Madras and Bengal. Sir William Pulteney was at Madeira on 1 June, and left a week later, reached Madras on 26 September, and arrived at Calcutta on 8 November. Homeward bound, she was at Saugor on 9 January 1812, reached St Helena on 12 May, and arrived at The Downs on 22 July.

=== EIC voyage #6 (1813–1814) ===
Barnard billed the EIC on 7 November 1812 for £1032 9s 6d for repairs to Sir William Pulteney, and stores.

Captain Christopher sailed from Portsmouth on 18 March 1813, bound for St Helena and Bengal. Sir William Pulteney was at Tenerife on 12 April, and reached St Helena on 21 June. She arrived at Calcutta on 11 November. Homeward bound, she was at Kedgeree on 30 January 1814, Madras on 18 February, and Point de Galle on 26 February. She reached the Cape on 25 April, and St Helena on 19 May, and arrived at The Downs on 6 August.

=== EIC voyage #7 (1815–1816) ===
Captain Thomas Dawney sailed from The Downs on 15 April 1815, bound for Bengal and Bombay. Sir William Pulteney was at Madeira on 26 April, and arrived at Calcutta on 3 September. Continuing her voyage, she was at Saugor on 4 December, and arrived at Bombay on 2 January 1816. Homeward bound, she was at Tellicherry on 5 February, and Point de Galle on 28 February. She reached St Helena on 8 May, and arrived at The Downs on 2 July.

== Fate ==
On 9 May 1817, Sir William Pulteney's register was cancelled. She had been sold to Spanish buyers.
