= William Pitt (1805 EIC ship) =

United Kingdom
- Name: William Pitt
- Owner: EIC voyages #1-6: Henry Bonham; 1EIC voyage #7: David Hunter
- Builder: Frances Barnard, Son & Roberts, Deptford
- Launched: 30 March 1805
- Fate: Sold for breaking up in 1820

General characteristics
- Tons burthen: 819, or 857, or 857 65/94 (bm)
- Length: Overall:145 ft 9 1/2 in (44.4 m); Keel:118 ft 3 1/2 in (36.1 m)
- Beam: 36 ft 1 in (11.0 m)
- Depth of hold: 14 ft 10 in (4.5 m)
- Complement: 1805:100; 1808:101
- Armament: 1805:32× 18-pounder guns; 1808:30 × 18-pounder guns
- Notes: Three decks

William Pitt was launched in 1805 as an East Indiaman. She made seven voyages for the British East India Company (EIC), between 1805 and 1819. In 1810 and 1811 she participated as a transport in two British military campaigns. She was sold for breaking up in 1820.

== EIC career ==
EIC voyage #1 (1805–1807): Captain William Edmeades acquired a letter of marque on 6 July 1805. He sailed from Falmouth on 10 August 1805, bound for the Cape of Good Hope, Madras, and Bengal. William Pitt was at Cork on 31 August, Madeira on 29 September, and San Salvadore on 11 November.

William Pitt was one of the EIC vessels that were part of the expedition under General Sir David Baird and Admiral Sir Home Riggs Popham that would in 1806 capture the Dutch Cape Colony. They would carry supplies and troops to the Cape, and then continue on their voyages.

William Pitt reached the Cape on 4 January 1806.

After the Dutch Governor Jansens signed a capitulation on 18 January 1806, and the British established control of the Cape Colony, HMS Belliqueux escorted the East Indiamen William Pitt, Jane, Duchess of Gordon, Sir William Pulteney, Comet to Madras. The convoy included the Northampton, Streatham, Europe, Union, Glory, and Sarah Christiana.

William Pitt reached Madras on 22 April and Penang on 4 June, and arrived at Diamond Harbour on 26 July. On 22 September was at Vizagapatam, on 28 September Coringa, on 4 October Madras, and on 30 December the Cape. She reached St Helena on 23 January 1807 and arrived at the Downs on 12 April.

EIC voyage #2 (1808–1809): Captain Charles Graham acquired a letter of marque on 20 January 1808. He sailed from Portsmouth on 15 April 1808, bound for Madras and Bengal. (Note: One source gives the name of William Pitt's master as Charles Gordon. However, two sources give it as Charles Graham, and the source that gives the Gordon name changes it to Graham on the next voyage.) William Pitt reached Madras on 22 August and arrived at Diamond Harbour on 12 December. She was at Kidderpore on 1 October. Homeward bound, she was at Saugor on 23 December, Coringa on 2 January 1809, Madras on 12 January, and Colombo on 7 February.

On 15 February William Pitt sailed from Point de Galle as part of a fleet of 15 East Indiamen under escort by HMS Culloden and HMS Terpsichore.

On 14 March 1809, off Mauritius, a gale developed. Four of the ships, Bengal, Calcutta, Jane, Duchess of Gordon, and Lady Jane Dundas, parted company with the main convoy. They were never heard of again.

William Pitt reached St Helena on 29 April and the Downs on 13 July.

EIC voyage #3 (1810–1812): Captain Charles Graham sailed from Portsmouth 14 March 1810, bound for the Cape, Madras, and Bengal. William Pitt was at the Cape on 22 May, and arrived at Madras on 5 August.

There the British government hired her as a transport for the Île de France (Mauritius). William Pitt was at Rodrigues on 6 November, and Port Louis, Mauritius, on 7 December. The invasion took place on 3 December.

By 17 February William Pitt was back at Saugor and Diamond Harbour on 24 February. There the government again hired her, this time for the invasion of Java.

William Pitt was at Malacca on 6 May. She was in the 1st division, which left Malacca on 1 June. She was at Batavia by 8 August. She was back at Diamond Harbour on 22 October and Calcutta on 15 November. Homeward bound, she was at Saugor on 17 February 1812. She was at Madras on 2 February, reached St Helena on 11 May, and arrived at Blackwall on 11 September.

EIC voyage #4 (1813–1814): Captain Charles Graham sailed from Portsmouth on 2 June 1813, bound for Ceylon and Bengal. William Pitt was at Madeira on 22 June and Colombo on 13 October. She arrived at Saugor on 4 December. She left Saugor on 17 February 1814, was at Point de Galle on 1 March, and the Cape on 25 March. She reached St Helena on 19 May and arrived at The Downs on 6 August.

EIC voyage #5 (1815–1816): Captain Graham sailed from The Downs on 8 April 1815, bound for Madras and Bengal. She reached Madras on 20 July, and arrived at Diamond Harbour on 19 August. She was at Saugor on 10 November and homeward bound, she left Saugor on 20 January 1816. She was at Madras on 6 February, Point de Galle on 14 February, and the Cape on 18 April. She reached St Helena on 10 May, and arrived at The Downs on 2 July.

EIC voyage #6 (1817–1818): Captain Graham sailed from The Downs on 14 April 1817, bound for Madras and Bengal. She reached Madras on 3 August and arrived at Diamond Harbour on 1 September and the New Anchorage on 21 October. She sailed from the New Anchorage on 7 December, reached St Helena on 13 February 1818, and arrived at The Downs on 2 May.

EIC voyage #7 (1819–1820): Captain Graham sailed from Portsmouth on 29 January 1819, bound for St Helena, Bencoolen, and China. She was at St Helena on 6 May and reached Bencoolen on 5 August. She reached Penang on 5 October and arrived at Whampoa Anchorage on 9 February 1820. Homeward bound, she crossed the Second Bar on 26 March, reached on St Helena on 26 July, and arrived at The Downs on 26 September.

== Fate ==
In 1820 William Pitt was sold for breaking up.
