= Henry Bonham =

Henry Bonham may refer to:

- Henry Bonham (cricketer) (1749–1800), English cricketer who played for Hampshire
- Henry Bonham (politician) (1765–1830), English politician, MP for Leominster 1806–12, Sandwich 1824–26, Rye 1826–30

== See also ==
- Bonham (surname)
