= Streatham (1805 EIC ship) =

History

United Kingdom
- Name: Streatham
- Owner: EIC voyage 1:1 William Borradaile; EIC voyages 2-7: Richardson Borradaile
- Builder: Dudman, Deptford
- Launched: 13 April 1805
- Fate: Sold for breaking up in 1821

General characteristics
- Type: East Indiaman
- Tons burthen: 819, or 81970/94 or 861 (bm)
- Length: 143 ft 11 in (43.9 m) (overall); 116 ft 2 1/2 in (35.4 m) (keel)
- Beam: 36 ft 5 in (11.1 m)
- Depth of hold: 14 ft 9 in (4.5 m)
- Sail plan: Full-rigged ship
- Complement: Letter of marque: 110; 1809: 133 – 44 Britons, 40 lascars, 33 Chinese, and 16 foreigners
- Armament: 30 × 18-pounder guns
- Notes: Three decks

Streatham was launched in 1805 as an East Indiaman for the British East India Company (EIC). She made seven voyages for the EIC. On her second voyage the French captured her, but the British Royal Navy recaptured her some months later. She was broken up in 1821.

== Career ==
=== EIC voyage #1 (1805-1807) ===
Captain John Dale acquired a letter of marque on 17 June 1805. He sailed from Cork on 31 August 1805, bound for Madras and Bengal. Streatham stopped at Madeira on 29 September.

Streatham was one of the EIC vessels that were part of the expedition under General Sir David Baird and Admiral Sir Home Riggs Popham that would in 1806 capture the Dutch Cape Colony. They would carry supplies and troops to the Cape, and then continue on their voyages.

At 3:30 a.m. on 1 November, near Rocas Atoll at 3°51′27″N 33°48′57″W, HMS Leda sighted the danger and fired a gun, the signal to tack; she herself barely missed the danger. King George was unable to tack and wrecked. As Britannia was on the point of tacking she ran afoul of Streatham and lost her bowsprit and foretopmast. She then drifted on to the atoll where she lost her rudder and bilged. In the morning Leda was able to rescue the survivors from King George and Comet, Europe, and Varuna sent their boats and were able to rescue about 400 people from Britannia, including Brisk, his crew, and recruits for the EIC's armies.

Streatheam reached San Salvador on 10 November, and the Cape of Good Hope on 4 January 1806.

After the Dutch Governor Jansens signed a capitulation on 18 January 1806, and the British established control of the Cape Colony, HMS Belliqueux escorted the East Indiamen William Pitt, Jane, Duchess of Gordon, Sir William Pulteney, and Comet to Madras. The convoy included Northampton, Streatham, Europe, Union, Glory, and Sarah Christiana.

Streatham arrived at Madras on 22 April. At Madras, the captains of the eight East Indiamen in the convoy joined together to present Captain George Byng, of Belliqueux, a piece of silver plate worth £100 as a token of appreciation for his conduct while they were under his orders. Byng wrote his thank you letter to them on 24 April.

Streatham then stopped at Penang on 5 June, before arriving at Diamond Harbour on 26 July. Homeward bound, she was at Saugor on 6 September. She stopped at Vizagapatam on 22 September, Coninga on 28 September, Madras again on 4 October, and the Cape on 31 December. She reached St Helena on 23 January 1807 and arrived at The Downs on 12 April.

=== EIC voyage #2 (1808-1810) ===
Captain Dale sailed from Portsmouth on 8 May 1808, bound for Bengal. Streatham was at Madeira on 30 May Madeira and Rio de Janeiro on 17 July. She had had to put in for repairs as she had sprung her foremast. She was expected to sail on the 25th. She arrived at Diamond Harbour on 3 November. Homeward bound, she was Kidderpore on 15 January 1809 and Saugor on 24 February. In March, Dale joined several other EIC captains in a letter of protest against the British Royal Navy's having impressed seamen from Indiamen.

Streatham and four other Indiamen, Europe, Lord Keith, Monarch, and Earl Spencer were expected to sail on 30 April under convoy by HMS Victor.

On 2 May 1809 they departed from the Sandheads with several smaller vessels as well. On 24 May a storm split the convoy and Victor and the small ships separately lost touch with the Indiamen. Monarch had a leak that had worsened. Dale, the senior EIC captain of the five vessels and so commodore, gave Monarch permission to sail to Penang. Captain Hawes requested that another of the Indiamen accompany him in case Monarch foundered. Dale detailed Earl Spencer to go with Monarch. Streatham, Europe, and Lord Keith continued on their way while hoping to meet up with Victor. They did not.

The French frigate Caroline captured Streatham and Europe on 31 May in 9°S 91°E. Streatham resisted and in the engagement she had three men killed and two wounded out of 137 people on board. Dale gave the breakdown of the people on board as 44 British, 16 foreign, 33 Chinese, 40 lascars, and four invalided soldiers. In the action the Chinese and Portuguese seamen deserted their guns; all the casualties were from among the British who continued to resist.

Lord Keith too exchanged broadsides with Caroline and was damaged, however she escaped and sailed to Penang to repair.

Caroline took all the Europeans from her prizes on board and put a prize crew on Europe. She was badly holed and Captain Feretier had to have some of her guns thrown overboard to lighten her. When the prisoners arrived at Saint-Paul Captain Dale and Captain William Gelston wrote a joint letter of thanks to Captain Féretier for the kind and humane treatment they received from him, his officers, and men.

The British recaptured Streatham and Europe during the raid on Saint-Paul on the Île Bonaparte on 21 September. She had a part cargo of saltpetre on board, but her captors had landed the rest of her cargo. The British raiding party burned the warehouses where the captors had stored the silk and other valuable parts of the cargo from both Stratham and Europe.

The French recorded the cargoes as comprising 1698 boxes of indigo, 1514 bales of piece goods, 1843 bales of silk, 11,000 bags of saltpetre, and 25 bales of handkerchiefs. The EIC gave the value of the cargo it had lost on the two Indiamen at £140,000 per vessel. The EIC did not insure its vessels or cargoes.

Lloyd's List (LL) reported on 9 January 1811 that the captured vessels, except for Europe, which had been sent to Bombay, had all arrived at the Cape of Good Hope.

Streatham then completed her voyage under Dale's command. She was at the Cape on 1 November, reached St Helena on 26 April 1810, and arrived at The Downs on 3 July.

=== EIC voyage #3 (1811-1812) ===
Captain Dale sailed from Torbay 12 May 1811, bound for Madras and Bengal. Streatham reached Madras on 10 September and arrived at Diamond Harbour on 15 October. Homeward bound, she was at Saugor on 12 December and Masulipatam on 18 January 1812. She reached Madras on 25 January and St Helena on 11 May. She arrived at The Downs on 21 July.

=== EIC voyage #4 (1813-1814) ===
Captain Charles Mortlock sailed from Portsmouth on 2 June 1813, bound for Bengal and Java. Streatham was at Madeira on 21 June, and arrived at Saugor on 6 November. She left Bengal on 31 January 1814 And reached Batavia on 24 February. She visited Amboina on 6 April and Banda on 23 April, returning to Amboina on 8 May and Batavia on 28 May. She reached St Helena on 17 September and arrived at The Downs on 24 November.

=== EIC voyage #5 (1815-1816) ===
Captain Peter Grant sailed from The Downs on 8 April 1815, bound for Madras and Bengal. She reached Madras on 20 July, arrived at Bengal, and by December was again at Madras. Her voyage ended on 5 July 1816.

=== EIC voyage #6 (1817-1818) ===
Captain Dale sailed from The Downs on 14 March 1817, bound for Madras and Bengal. Stratham reached Madras on 8 July and arrived the New Anchorage, Calcutta (near Diamond Harbour and Kedgeree), on 26 July. Homeward bound, she reached St Helena on 13 February 1818 and arrived at The Downs on 1 May.

=== EIC voyage #7 (1819-1820) ===
Captain Thomas Haviside sailed from Portsmouth on 1 March 1819, bound for Bengal and China. - 10 Jul Diamond Harbour - 20 Aug New Anchorage - 26 Dec Penang - 15 Nov Malacca - 19 Nov Singapore - 9 Feb 1820 Whampoa - On 20 March she crossed the Second Bar. Streatham left China on 25 March 1820 in company with Larkins. On the way home Larkins grounded on the west side of Borneo. Streatham pulled Larkins off, saving her. Streatham reached St Helena on 19 June and arrived at The Downs on 11 August.

== Fate ==
In 1821 Streatham was sold for breaking up.
