= Bonham (surname) =

Bonham is a surname of English and Welsh origin derived from the French phrase, bon homme, literally meaning "good man".

Notable people having this surname include:

- Bill Bonham (born 1948), former Major League Baseball pitcher
- Sir George Bonham, 1st Baronet (1803–1863), British colonial governor and governor of Hong Kong
- Sir George Bonham, 2nd Baronet (1847–1927), British diplomat, son of the above
- Henry Bonham (disambiguation), several people
- Helena Bonham Carter, English actress
- Horace Bonham (1835–1892), American painter
- Jack Bonham, Irish footballer, goalkeeper for Watford and Brentford
- James Bonham (1807–1836), American soldier who died at the Battle of the Alamo
- Jason Bonham (born 1966), drummer, son of John Bonham
- John Bonham (disambiguation), several people
  - John Bonham (1948–1980), drummer of British classic rock band Led Zeppelin
- Mildred Amanda Baker Bonham (1840–1907), American traveler, journalist
- Milledge Luke Bonham (1813–1890), Confederate General
- Prudence Bonham (born 1948), Australian former politician and marine biologist
- Reginald Bonham (1906–1984), English blind chess player
- Robbie Bonham (1970–2025), Irish comedian
- Tiny Bonham (1913–1949), pitcher for the New York Yankees and the Pittsburgh Pirates
- Tracy Bonham (born 1969), American musician

== See also ==
- Boneham
- Goodman (surname)
