= Essex (1803 EIC ship) =

History

United Kingdom
- Owner: Henry Bonham
- Operator: British East India Company
- Builder: Perry, Blackwall
- Launched: 7 February 1803
- Fate: Register cancelled 20 August 1821

General characteristics
- Tons burthen: 1257, or 125730/94, or 1352(bm)
- Length: Overall:165 ft 7 1/2 in (50.5 m); Keel:134 ft 0 in (40.8 m)
- Beam: 42 ft 0 in (12.8 m)
- Depth of hold: 17 ft 1 in (5.2 m)
- Complement: 1803:130; 1807:129
- Armament: 1803: 26 ×18-pounder guns + 10 × 18-pounder carronades; 1807: 36 × 18-pounder guns
- Notes: Essex was reputed to have had the greatest spread of sail of any East Indiaman.

Essex was launched on 7 February 1803 by Perry, Blackwell as an East Indiaman. She made seven voyages for the British East India Company (EIC) until on 20 August 1821 her register was cancelled as she had been demolished.

== Career ==
1st EIC voyage (1803–1805): George Bonham acquired a letter of marque on 27 May 1803. He sailed from Portsmouth on 6 June 1803, bound for Ceylon and Bombay. Essex was at Rio de Janeiro on 16 September reached Madras on 2 February 1804. She was at Colombo on 24 February and Tellicherry on 14 April, arriving at Bombay on 30 April. Homeward bound, she reached St Helena on 4 November and arrived in the Downs on 7 February 1805.

2nd EIC voyage (1806–1807): Captain Bonham sailed from Portsmouth on 18 February 1806, bound for Madras and China. Essex reached Madras on 28 June and Penang on 13 August, and arrived at Whampoa Anchorage on 23 October. Homeward bound, she crossed the Second Bar on 10 December, reached Penang on 23 January 1807, the Cape on 6 April, and St Helena on 17 April. She arrived in the Downs on 2 July.

3rd EIC voyage (1808–1809): Captain Richard Nisbet acquired a letter of marque on 16 November 1807. He sailed from Torbay on 29 January 1808, bound for Bombay and China. Essex reached Bombay on 28 May and Malacca on 29 August, and arrived at Whampoa on 2 October. Homeward bound, she crossed the Second Bar on 11 February 1809, reached Penang on 31 March and St Helena on 5 July, and arrived back at the Downs on 8 September.

4th EIC voyage (1811–1812): Captain Nisbet sailed from Torbay on 2 February 1811. Essex reached Bombay on 8 June. Bound for China, she reached Penang on 22 August and arrived at Whampoa on 2 October. Homeward bound, she crossed the Second Bar on 17 December, reached St Helena on 21 March 1812, and arrived back in the Downs on 13 May.

5th EIC voyage (1813–1814): Captain Nisbet sailed from Portsmouth on 11 January 1813, bound for Madras and China. Essex reached the Cape on 8 May and Madras on 7 July. She reached Penang on 17 August and Malacca on 9 September. She arrived at Whampoa on 23 October. Homeward bound, she crossed the Second Bar on 18 January 1814. On 18 February she was off Lintin Island. She reached St Helena on 26 May and arrived at the Downs on 6 August.

6th EIC voyage (1814–1816): Captain Nisbet sailed from the Downs on 10 November 1814, bound for Bombay and China. Essex reached the Cape on 31 March 1815 Cape and Bombay on 17 May. Proceeding to China, she reached Penang on 8 August and Malacca on 19 August. She arrived at Whampoa on 22 September. Homeward bound, she crossed the Second Bar on 27 November, reached St Helena on 23 March 1816, and arrived at the Downs on 10 May.

7th EIC voyage (1819–1820): Captain Nisbet sailed from Torbay on 20 January 1819, bound for Bombay and China. Essex reached Bombay on 29 May and Malacca on 14 August. She arrived at Whampoa on 9 September. Homeward bound, she crossed the Second Bar on 8 December, reached St Helena on 22 March 1820, and arrived at the Downs on 9 May.

== Fate ==
On 20 August 1821 her register was cancelled, her demolition having been completed.
