= Britannia (1772 EIC ship) =

History

United Kingdom
- Name: Britannia
- Owner: 1772:Watson; 1775: East India Company
- Builder: Bombay Dockyard
- Launched: 1772
- Fate: Wrecked November 1805

General characteristics
- Tons burthen: 747, or 770, or 77087/94, (bm)
- Length: Overall:137 ft 4 in (41.9 m); Keel:110 ft 0 1/2 in (33.5 m)
- Beam: 36 ft 3 1/2 in (11.1 m)
- Depth of hold: 14 ft 7 in (4.4 m)
- Sail plan: Full-rigged ship
- Complement: 1793:99; 1795:80; 1803:210
- Armament: 1793 (1): 26 × 12&9&6-pounder guns + 4 swivel guns; 1793 (2):26 × 12&9&6-pounder guns; 1795:26 × 12&6-pounder guns + 9 swivel guns; 1803: 40 × 12-pounder guns
- Notes: Three decks

Britannia was launched by the Bombay Dockyard in 1772, and was rebuilt in 1778. The British East India Company (EIC) apparently acquired her in 1775. Between 1779 she made eleven complete voyages as an East Indiaman for the EIC. She also participated in three naval campaigns, during the first of which she was deployed as a cruiser off Sumatra. There she engaged and captured a French ship. In the other two she served as a transport. She set out for her twelfth EIC voyage but was lost in 1805 during the third naval campaign.

== Origins ==
There is ambiguity concerning Britannia's launch year. Reports include 1772, 1775, 1777, or 1778. The source of the 1772 year is a list that of vessels built at the Bombay Dockyard that shows her owner as Mr. Watson. The same list shows a Britannia being rebuilt in 1778. These are the only two mentions of a Britannia being built between 1736 and 1840.

Britannia was built of teak and her long life as an East Indiaman sailing between England and India and China demonstrated both the utility of teak, and the skill in ship construction of Eastern shipyards. She was also one of only a handful of merchant ships that the EIC actually owned. (Almost without exception the EIC leased and chartered its merchant ships.)

== Career ==
Britannia's career before the EIC acquired her is obscure. Captain Newman Mallack sailed her from Bombay to Calcutta, where she arrived on 1 September 1779. On the 5th, Captain George Hutchinson of Stafford, his officers and crew, took over Britannia to sail her to England. (Stafford had been lost on the Hooghly River on 29 August.)

=== EIC voyage #1 (1779-1781) ===
Captain George Hutchinson was at Ingeli (a point on the west side of the Hooghli Estuary), on 18 November. From there he sailed Britannia to Bombay, South East Asia, China, and England. On 28 December she was at Cochin, on 1 January 1780 at Tellicherry, on 13 January at Onore, and on 27 January Bombay. She sailed up to Surat, where she arrived 5 February, and then on to Mangalore (15 February), Tellicherry again (9 May), and Madras (20 May). Britannia reached Malacca on 19 July and arrived at Whampoa anchorage on 5 September. Leaving for England, she crossed the Second Bar on 13 December, reached St Helena on 19 May 1781, and arrived at The Downs on 21 October.

=== EIC voyage #2 (1782-1783) ===
Captain Edward Cumming sailed from Portsmouth on 5 May 1782, bound for St Helena and Bencoolen. Britannia reached St Helena on 24 July and arrived at Bencoolen on 27 November. She cruised the coast of Sumatra between Pring (12 January 1783) and Pulau Pisang (11 February), both at the time pepper ports, before returning to Bencoolen on 7 March. Homeward bound, she reached St Helena on 12 July and arrived at The Downs on 6 October.

=== EIC voyage #3 (1784-1786) ===
Captain Cumming sailed from Portsmouth on 29 December 1784, bound for Madras and China. Britannia reached the Cape of Good Hope on 27 March and Madras on 28 May. She reached Malacca on 3 August and arrived at Whampoa on 15 September. Homeward bound, she crossed the Second Bar on 2 January 1786, reached St Helena on 5 April, and arrived at The Downs on 24 June.

=== EIC voyage #4 (1787-1788) ===
Captain Cumming sailed from The Downs on 6 January 1787, bound for Bengal. Britannia was at Madeira on 18 January and the Cape on 3 April Cape; she arrived at Diamond Harbour on 11 June. Homeward bound, she was at Cox's Island on 14 January 1788. She reached St Helena on 25 April, and arrived at The Downs on 7 July.

=== EIC voyage #5 (1789-1790) ===
Captain Cumming sailed from Portsmouth on 11 February 1789, bound for St Helena and China. Britannia reached St Helena on 7 May and Batavia on 3 September. She arrived at Whampoa on 28 November. Homeward bound, she left Whampoa on 2 February 1790, reached St Helena on 30 May, and arrived at The Downs on 18 August.

=== EIC voyage #6 (1791-1792) ===
(6) 1790/1 Bombay and China. Captain Cumming sailed from Torbay on 2 February 1791, bound for Bombay and China. Britannia reached Bombay on 1 June and arrived at Whampoa on 22 September. Homeward bound, she crossed the Second Bar on 14 November, reached St Helena on 25 February 1792, and arrived at The Downs on 22 April.

=== EIC voyage #7 (1793-1795) ===
By the time Britannia sailed again war with France had broken out. Captain Thomas Cheap, Jr. acquired two letters of marque, the first on 4 March 1793, and the second on 21 March.

Captain Cheap sailed from Portsmouth on 5 April 1793, bound for Madras and Bengal. Britannia reached Madras on 14 August and arrived at Diamond Harbour on 8 September.

In late 1793 John Shore, the EIC's Governor-General of India, formed a squadron from the company's own ships to patrol the Sea of Bengal and Southeast Asia. He diverted two East Indiamen, William Pitt and Britannia, and the country ship Nonsuch from their regular route for the service. A vessel of the Bombay Marine, possibly Viper, accompanied them. The reason for the move was the coming together of two problems, the inability of the British Royal Navy to maintain a presence in the area, and intelligence concerning the presence of French privateers and naval vessels in the area.

The EIC appointed Captain Charles Mitchell, of William Pitt, Commodore of its squadron. Britannia set out on her naval mission and was at Sagar Island on 5 December. She reached Malacca on 29 December.

On 21 January 1794 Houghton joined the squadron. The next day the squadron engaged two French privateers, Vengeur, of 34 guns and 250 men, and Résolue, of 26 guns and 230 men. Britannia captured Vengeur, and Nonsuch captured Résolue, with the French captains realising that further resistance would be pointless as William Pitt and Houghton came up. Eleven French sailors had been killed and 25 wounded; losses on Résolue were heavy. British losses were one killed and two wounded on Britannia.

Britannia continued her naval role for some months. After the engagement she sailed to Batavia, arriving on 26 January. She then visited Benkulen on 4 March, before returning to Batavia on 2 June. Captain Cheap died of an illness in June. Britannia sailed to Malacca (16 July), Penang (5 August), and Acheh (3 September). She ended her naval role and returned to Diamond Harbour on 25 September. Homeward bound, she was at Saugor on 29 November, reached St Helena on 18 March 1795m, and arrived at The Downs on 25 July.

=== West Indies expedition (1795–1796) ===
Captain Thomas Barrow acquired a letter of marque on 16 October 1795.

In 1795 Admiral Hugh Cloberry Christian mounted and expedition to the West Indies. The EIC chartered 16 vessels to the British Government to augment the Navy Transport Board's own transports.

The expedition sailed on 6 October, 16 November, and 9 December, but weather forced the vessels to put back. Britannia sailed from Portsmouth on 29 January 1796, but had to put back. The fleet finally successfully sailed on 20 March to invade St Lucia, with troops under Lieutenant-General Sir Ralph Abercromby.

Britannia was at Barbados by 14 April, Martinique on 24 April, and St Lucia on 28 April. St Lucia surrendered to the British on 25 May. The British went on to capture Saint Vincent and Grenada.

Britannia returned to Martinique on 5 June and was at Saint-Pierre, Martinique, on 13 June. She arrived back at The Downs on 8 August.

=== EIC voyage #8 (1797-1798) ===
Captain Barrow sailed from Plymouth on 22 February 1797, bound for St Helena, Madras, and Bengal. Britannia was at Saint Helena on 8 May St Helena and reached Madras on 1 August. She then cruised the coast, before returning to Madras on 30 September. She arrived at Diamond Harbour on 5 November. Homeward Bound, she was at Saugor on 13 March 1798, reached the Cape on 19 June and St Helena on 5 August, and arrived at The Downs on 25 October.

=== EIC voyage #9 (1799-1801) ===
Captain Barrow sailed from Portsmouth on 24 April 1799, bound for Madras, Bengal, Bombay, and China. Britannia reached Madras on 26 August and Vizagaptam on 2 October, and arrived at Diamond Harbour on 22 October. Continuing her voyage, she was at Saugor on 19 December, reached Colombo on 13 February 1800, and arrived at Bombay on 5 March. She left Bombay but soon returned on 18 September because she was overcrowded. Resuming her voyage, she was at Mangalore on 5 October, Cannanore on 13 October, and Tellicherry on 28 November; she arrived at Whampoa on 15 March 1801. Homeward bound, she was at the Bocca Tigris on 7 July, reached St Helena on 21 September, and arrived at The Downs on 2 December.

=== EIC voyage #10 (1802-1803) ===
Captain Barrow sailed from The Downs on 5 May 1802, bound for Madras. Britannia reached Madras on 1 September, left on 20 October, and four days later returned to Madras. She reached St Helena on 15 January 1803 and arrived at The Downs on 22 March.

=== EIC voyage #11 (1803-1805) ===
By the time Britannia sailed war with France had resumed. Captain Jonathan Birch acquired a letter of marque on 3 October 1803. (Note: The number of guns is high for a merchantman of 700 tons (bm), and the number of men is double what one would expect on a vessel twice her burthen. The reasons are currently unclear.) He sailed from Portsmouth on 26 October, bound for St Helena and Madras. Britannia reached St Helena on 5 March 1804 and arrived at Madras on 5 October. Homeward bound, she reached St Helena on 31 December and arrived at The Downs on 19 March 1805.

== Fate ==
Captain Birch sailed from Portsmouth on 27 July 1805, bound for Madras and Bengal on her twelfth voyage for the EIC. She was one of the EIC vessels that were part of the expedition under General Sir David Baird and Admiral Sir Home Riggs Popham that would in 1806 capture the Dutch Cape Colony. They would carry supplies and troops to the Cape, and then continue on their voyages. Britannia was at Cork on 27 August and Madeira on 29 September.

Britannia and King George wrecked on 1 November 1805 on Rocas Atoll at 3°51′27″N 33°48′57″W. HMS Leda sighted the danger at 3:30 a.m., and fired a gun, the signal to tack, herself barely missing the danger. King George was unable to tack and wrecked. As Britannia was on the point of tacking she ran afoul of Streatham and lost her bowsprit and foretopmast. She then drifted on to the atoll where she lost her rudder and bilged.

During the night Britannia was gotten off the rocks but took on so much water that she sank quickly, having drifted some seven miles from where she struck. In the morning, before she sank, Comet, Europe, and Varuna sent their boats and were able to rescue about 400 people from Britannia, including Brisk, his crew, and recruits for the EIC's armies.

Although the only cargo saved consisted of 12 chests of dollars (out of some 160), from Britannia, the only deaths were General Yorke and a soldier from King George and a seaman from Britannia. The EIC charged her cargo to the British government.

Popham hired Varuna at St Salvador Bay to carry the survivors on. The British fleet, including Varuna, arrived in Table Bay on 5 January 1806 and anchored off Robben Island.

EIC records show Britannia wrecking at the Brazils on 4 December, but the date is more than a month too late. Lloyd's List reported another incorrect date, 4 November, and an incorrect location, the Paraiba River.
