= Stafford (1769 EIC ship) =

History

United Kingdom
- Name: Stafford
- Owner: EIC voyage #1:Thomas Lyell; EIC voyage #2:Thomas Fitzhugh; EIC voyage #3:Thomas Lyell
- Builder: Wells, Deptford
- Launched: 15 November 1769
- Fate: Wrecked August 1779

General characteristics
- Tons burthen: 804, or 833, or 83372/94 (bm)
- Length: Overall:141 ft 9 in (43.2 m); Keel:113 ft 8 3/4 in (34.7 m)
- Beam: 37 ft 3 1/2 in (11.4 m)
- Depth of hold: 14 ft 9 in (4.5 m)
- Sail plan: Full-rigged ship
- Notes: Three decks

Stafford was an East Indiaman launched in 1769 that made two complete voyages to India and China for the British East India Company. During her third voyage she was wrecked in 1779 at Calcutta.

== EIC voyage #1 (1770–1772) ==
Captain Thomas Lyell sailed from The Downs on 6 February 1770, bound for Madras and China. On 11 March Stafford was at Brest, France. She reached Johanna on 29 July, and arrived at Madras on 31 August. She continued her voyage, reaching Malacca on 8 November and Trengganu on 17 May 1791 before arriving at Whampoa on 12 July. Homeward bound, she was at the 27 Dec Bocca Tigris on 27 December, reached St Helena on 6 April 1772, and arrived at The Downs on 27 June.

== EIC voyage #2 (1774–1777) ==
Captain Thomas Lyell sailed from Torbay on 27 Apr 1774, bound for Bombay and China. Stafford reached Johanna on 1 September, and arrived at Bombay on 4 January 1775. She then sailed back and forth from Bombay, visiting numerous ports in India before setting out for China.

On 19 December Stafford was at Bassein, returning to Bombay on 4 January 1775. On 17 January she was at Surat, and she returned to Bombay on 31 January. She was at Surat again on 19 February and Bombay on 1 March. On 12 March Stafford was at Onore, on 18 March Tellicherry, on 25 March Anjengo, on 7 April Cochin, on 17 April Tellicherry again, on 5 May Mangalore, and on 9 May Onore again. She returned to Bombay on 27 May.

Stafford then set out for China, returning to India several times first. On 4 October she was at Malacca. She returned to Malacca on 8 October and 26 October. She visited Cochin again on 3 January 1776 and Surat on 12 February. She was at Malacca again on 18 June, and finally arrived at Whampoa on 4 August.

Homeward bound, Stafford crossed the Second Bar on 7 January 1777, reached St Helena on 29 May, and arrived at The Downs on 1 October.

== EIC voyage #3 (1778—Loss) ==
Captain George Hutchinson sailed from Portsmouth on 27 May 1778, bound for Madras and Bengal. She had to delay her departure to allow Lieutenant-General Sir Eyre Coote to board with his wife and suite. Coote was sailing to take up the position of Commander in Chief of the EIC's forces in India.

Stafford reached Madeira on 9 June and left on 18 June. On 8 September she anchored at Table Bay. She left the Cape of Good Hope on 1 October, together with two other Indiamen and under escort by the 64-gun HMS Asia. On 20 November the convoy encountered a Dutch vessel from Batavia that informed them that hostilities had broken out on the Coromandel Coast and Bengal. Stafford parted from the convoy, which sailed on to Bombay. Stafford anchored in Madras Roads on 28 December. On 19 March 1799 Stafford and Coote sailed for Bengal. On 22 or 23 March she anchored at Kedgeree.

== Fate ==
Stafford was wrecked on a sandbank in the Hooghly River on 29 August 1779, and became a total loss. Fortunately all her crew were saved and were transferred to Britannia to bring Britannia back to England.
