= Boneham =

Boneham is a surname. Notable people with the surname include:

- Peter Boneham (born 1934), American-born Canadian choreographer, dance educator, and artistic director
- Rupert Boneham (born 1964), American mentor for troubled teens

== See also ==
- Bonham (surname)
