= Medway (1801 ship) =

British merchant ship, foundered 1812

History

United Kingdom
- Name: Medway
- Namesake: River Medway
- Builder: Fort William, India
- Launched: 24 August 1801
- Fate: Foundered 1812

General characteristics
- Tons burthen: 192, or 1925/94, or 1955/94 (bm)
- Armament: 6 × 4-pounder guns + 4 × 12-pounder carronades
- Notes: Teak

Medway was launched at Fort William, Calcutta in 1801. She immediately sailed to Britain under charter to the British East India Company (EIC). There her owners sold her. She traded with Madeira and the Americas before she foundered in 1812.

== Career ==
Captain William Brabazon sailed from Calcutta on 6 September 1801. Medway was at Culpee on 18 September, reached Saint Helena on 3 January 1802, and arrived at The Downs on 25 March.

Medway arrived at London on the 30th with a cargo of rice. The EIC announced the sale on 30 April 1802 of 1,300 bags of rice that had come from Bengal on Georgiana in private trade. The sale of Georgiana's rice was to follow the sale that day of 27,000 bags of rice for the EIC's account that the East Indiamen Ganges, Cornwallis, Medway, and Union had brought.

Medway was admitted to the Registry of Great Britain 24 September 1802. She was sold in London.

She appears in the 1802 issue of Lloyd's Register with W. Potts, master, Youille & Co., owner, and trade London–Madeira.

On 25 March 1803 Lloyd's List reported that Medway, Potts, master, had put into New London after having been struck by lightning. She had been sailing from New York to Madeira at the time of the strike.

Gales in February 1808 caused Medway, Potts, master, to lose an anchor and cables at Margate while sailing from London to Madeira.

Around 1808-9 Medway's master changed to W. Watson, her owner changed to Middleton, and her trade to London–Rio de Janeiro.

The Register of Shipping for 1813 shows Medway's master as Pricket, and her trade still as London–Rio de Janeiro.

== Fate ==
Medway, Birkett, master foundered on 7 March 1812 around 20°N 74°W as she was sailing from San Domingo to London. Her crew arrived three days later at Gonsalves in their boats.
