= John Bonham (disambiguation) =

John Bonham (1948–1980) was an English drummer.

John Bonham may also refer to:

- John Bonham (mercer), British soldier and mercer in the 13th and/or 14th centuries
- John Bonham (MP) (c. 1524–1555), for Chippenham
- John Bonham (rugby league) (born 1948), Australian rugby league player

== See also ==
- John Bonham-Carter (disambiguation)
