= Larkins (1808 ship) =

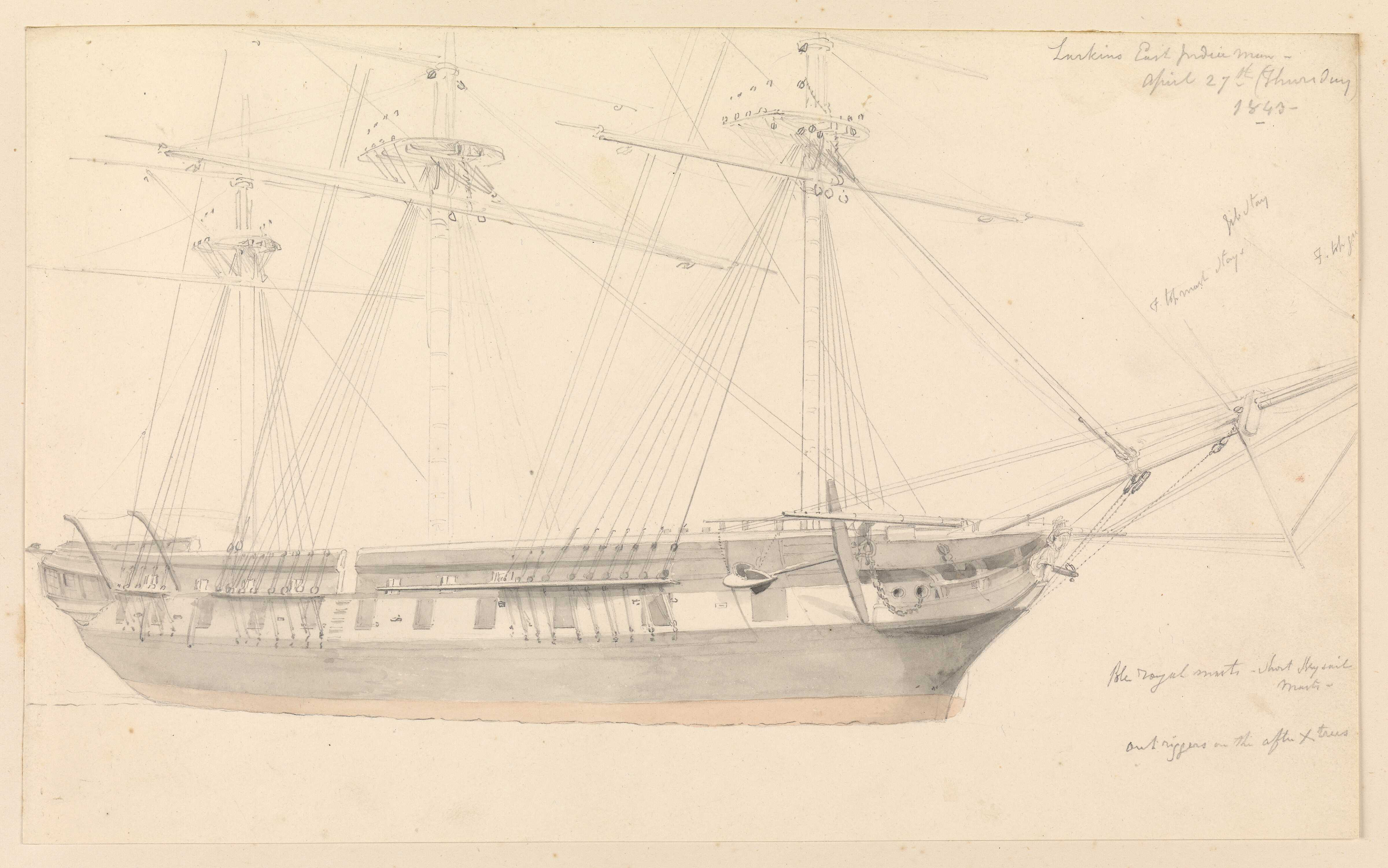
- Larkins, East Indiaman, 27 April 1843

History

United Kingdom
- Name: Louisa
- Owner: EIC voyages 1–5:John Pascall Larkins; EIC voyage 6:Henry Morse Samson; 1826 :Joseph Somes; 1835:Ingram; 1842:Haviside; 1853:P&O; 1857:European and Australian Royal Mail; 1858:P&O
- Builder: Hudson, Bacon, Harvey & Weatherall, Calcutta
- Launched: 17 November 1808
- Renamed: Larkins (Note: John Pascal Larkins named Larkins for his nephew Thomas Larkins, who had distinguished himself as captain of Warren Hastings.)
- Fate: Hulk broken up in 1876

General characteristics
- Tons burthen: 637, 647, or 676, or 67665/94, or 701 (bm)
- Length: 127 ft 5 in (38.8 m) (overall); 101 ft 1 1/4 in (30.8 m) (keel)
- Beam: 34 ft 5 in (10.5 m)
- Depth of hold: 19 ft 0 in (5.8 m)
- Propulsion: Sail
- Complement: 70 men
- Armament: 14 × 12-pounder guns +2 swivel guns
- Notes: Teak; three decks

Larkins made ten voyages for the British East India Company (EIC), all as an "extra ship", i.e. under contract. On two of these voyages she first transported convicts to Australia. She also made one convict voyage independently of the EIC. She traded extensively between England and India or China, and in this twice (1820 and 1843) suffered serious but not fatal maritime mishaps. In 1853 she became a coal hulk at Albany, Western Australia, and remained there until she was broken up in 1876.

== Career ==
John Pascal Larkins purchased Louisa after her launch in 1808, but before her completion, and renamed her Larkins.

=== Six EIC and one convict voyage ===
EIC voyage #1 (1809–1810): Captain Andrew Barclay sailed from Calcutta on 19 August 1809. Larkins was at Saugor on 20 September. She reached the Cape of Good Hope on 28 November and Ascension on 25 December. She arrived at the Downs on 6 February 1810.

Captain Thomas Dumbleton acquired a letter of marque on 30 April 1810. He would be Larkins's captain for her next four voyages.

EIC voyage #2 (1809–1810): He sailed from Portsmouth on 9 June 1810, bound for Bengal. Larkins reached Madeira on 26 June and arrived at Calcutta on 11 December. On 15 February 1811 she was in the Eastern Channel of the Hooghly River. She reached St Helena on 11 May and arrived at the Downs on 13 July.

EIC voyage #3 (1812–1813): Dumbleton sailed from Portsmouth on 10 March 1812, bound for St Helena and Bengal. Larkins reached St Helena on 19 May and arrived at Calcutta on 20 September. Homeward bound, she was at Saugor on 27 November. She reached St Helena on 16 March 1813 and arrived at the Downs on 5 June.

EIC voyage #4 (1814–1815): Dumbleton sailed from Portsmouth on 8 June 1814, bound for Madeira and Bengal. Larkins reached Madeira on 27 June and arrived at Calcutta on 30 November. Homeward bound, she was at Saugor on 6 March 1815. She visited Bencoolen on 31 March, reached St Helena on 14 July, and arrived at the Downs on 19 September.

EIC voyage #5 (1816–1817): Dumbleton sailed from Portsmouth on 30 March 1816, bound for Madras. Larkins was at Madeira on 17 April and arrived at Madras on 17 July. Homeward bound, she reached St Helena on 6 December and arrived at the Downs on 30 January 1817.

First convict voyage (1817): Captain Henry Wilkinson left England on 20 July 1817 and arrived at Sydney on 22 November 1817. She had embarked 250 convicts for transport to New South Wales, of whom two died on the voyage. the 46th and 48th regiments of Foot provided 40 men for the guard. Captain John Brabyn of the Royal Veterans Companies, who was returning to New South Wales, commanded the guard. On 6 January 1818 Larkins sailed for China.

EIC voyage #6 (1819–1820): Captain Robert Locke sailed from Portsmouth on 22 April 1819. Larkins left China on 25 March 1820 in company with Streatham. On her way home Larkins grounded on the west side of Borneo. Streatham, Captain Heaviside (or Haviside), pulled Larkins off, saving her. Larkins returned to England on 13 August 1820.

=== Licensed ship ===
Between 1821 and 1826 Larkins traded with India under a license from the EIC. In August 1824 the government in India hired Larkins to carry troops from Calcutta to Chittagong. She was then to sail on to Bencoolen. From Bencoolen she was to return to Calcutta before sailing for England. (The voyage to Bencoolen may have been to withdraw EIC personnel there as a consequence of the British having ceded Bencoolen to the Netherlands in the Anglo-Dutch Treaty of 1824.)

On 18 June 1825, Larkins, which had sailed from Calcutta for England, had to return as she was leaky. The expectation was that she would have to go into dock. After Larkins was pulled out of the dock and had taken on part of her cargo, it was discovered that she was still taking on water. She therefore was pulled back into the dock to be coppered and sheathed.

=== Four EIC voyages and two convict voyages ===
Between 1827 and 1834 Larkins again sailed for the EIC under four charters, each for one voyage.

EIC voyage #7 (1827–1828): On 23 March 1827 The EIC chartered Larkins from Somes for £13 9s per ton for a voyage to China and Quebec. Captain William Campbell then sailed from Portsmouth on 29 June. Larkins was at "Caipang Bay" on 25 October, and arrived at Whampoa Anchorage on 30 December. On 7 February 1828 she crossed the Second Bar. She reached St Helena on 22 April and arrived at Quebec on 19 June. She returned to England on 14 September 1828.

EIC voyage #8 (1829–1830) & second convict voyage: The EIC chartered Larkins on 28 May 1829 for £8 5s per ton to carry convicts to New South Wales and to bring back tea from China. Captain Campbell sailed from London on 6 July 1829. Larkins then sailed from Cork on 16 August. She arrived Sydney on 12 December. She had embarked 200 convicts, of whom three died on the way; one was landed before Larkins left Cork. Captain Mahon and 29 men from the 63rd regiment of Foot provided the guard. Larkins arrived at Whampoa Anchorage on 20 March 1830. Homeward bound, she crossed the Second Bar on 16 April, reached St Helena on 28 July, and arrived at the Downs on 16 September.

EIC voyage #9 (1831–1832), & third convict voyage: The EIC chartered Larkins on 29 April 1831 for £7 9s 6d per ton again to take convicts to Australia and then bring back tea from China. Captain Campbell sailed from the Downs on 19 June 1831 for Van Diemen's Land. Larkins arrived at Hobart on 19 October. She had embarked 280 convicts, all of whom survived the journey. She arrived on 29 January 1832 at Whampoa Anchorage. Homeward bound, she crossed the Second Bar on 4 March, reached St Helena on 5 June, and arrived at the Downs on 27 July.

EIC voyage #10 (1833–1834): The EIC chartered Larkins on 24 January 1833 for £14 14s per ton for a voyage to Madras, Bengal, and China. Captain Campbell sailed from the Downs on 21 March 1833. Larkins reached Calcutta on 6 July. She was at Kedgeree on 29 August, and arrived at Whampoa Anchorage on 8 November. Homeward bound, she crossed the Second Bar on 10 January 1834, reached St Helena on 18 March, and arrived at the Downs on 17 May.

=== General merchantman ===
Lloyd's Register for 1835 shows Larkins's master changing from Campbell to Ingram, and her owner as Ingram & Co. Her trade is London—Calcutta.

In 1842 Ingram sold Larkins to Haviside & Co., of Cornhill. Lloyd's Register for 1842 shows Larkins's master as Hibbert and her owner as Haviside. Her trade is London—Madras and then London—Bombay. The 1841 volume shows no master or owner.

On 2 February 1843 Larkins arrived in the Downs on her return from China. A gale developed and although two steam tugs had been dispatched to bring her up the Thames, the weather was too strong to permit them to take her in tow. As the weather drove her towards the shore, the captain cut away her main and mizzen masts; still, on 5 February the gale drove her onshore about a mile east of Margate. She had a cargo of tea. She was refloated between 10 and 13 February.

In August 1844 Larkins, Captain Hibert, was in Madras Roads with a partial cargo of cotton. The cotton spontaneously combusted but the crew was able to subdue the fire, although two hold stanchions were burned. The Times of 5 November 1844 reported that a fire had damaged Larkins at Madras on 21 August. The Morning Post of 4 November 1844 incorrectly reported that the fire had destroyed her.

In 1853 Lloyd's Register showed Larkins with Philpot, master, Haviside, owner, but without any mention of a trade.

=== Coal hulk ===
On 4 March 1853 the Peninsular & Oriental Steam Navigation Co. (P&O) purchased Larkins in London from Haviside. P&O wanted to place her at Albany, Western Australia, where she could serve as a coal hulk at their coaling depot there.

Captain Hederstedt sailed from London on 24 March 1853 and arrived at Albany on 11 July. Larkins had a crew of 41, and carried 1000 tons of coal and stores. She also brought 20 passengers.

P&O moored Larkins in Princess Royal Harbour and stripped her to a hulk, removing her upper masts. However, early in 1855 P&O stopped its steamer service between Singapore and Sydney. This left Larkins redundant.

The British government sought tenders for conveying mail from England to Melbourne via Southampton, Alexandria, and Suez. P&O tendered, but lost to the European and Columbian Steam Navigation Company, which then changed its name to European and Australian Royal Mail Co. P&O sold Larkins and the coal she was holding in 1857 to European and Australia, but European and Australian collapsed in 1858. At the next call for tenders on the route P&O's bid won. Larkins then reverted to P&O's ownership.

In March 1865 Larkins served as a lazaretto for three weeks for a girl who had developed scarlet fever while a passenger aboard RMS Bombay. Larkins also served as a signal relay station. When the Breaksea Island lighthouse sighted an arriving ship, it would hoist a signal. Larkins would repeat the signal, and fire a gun (day), or launch a rocket (night) to alert Albany.

Larkins gradually deteriorated, despite repairs, and despite being cut down to only one deck.

== Fate ==
On 8 September 1876 P&O sold Larkins for breaking up. The harbour master further insisted that no part of her be left above the high water mark.

== Postscript ==
Some of Larkins's teak timber ended up in local buildings and a locally-built yacht. After some changes of ownership, her figurehead, which had been removed after RMS Bombay collided with Larkins, was donated in 1962 to the Albany Residence Museum.

A plan of the P&O coaling wharf and the area around it dating to 1897 suggests that what was left of her may have been burnt. The spot is now under landfill (35.034013°S 117.894658°E), and has been subject to inconclusive test bores. Should the site prove to be the resting place of the last remnants of Larkins, it will come under the protections of the Historic Shipwrecks Act 1976.
