= John Bonham-Carter =

John Bonham-Carter may refer to:

- John Bonham-Carter (1788–1838), British politician and barrister, MP for Portsmouth
- John Bonham-Carter (1817–1884), MP for Winchester, son of the above

== See also ==
- Bonham-Carter
- John Bonham (1948–1980), English musician and songwriter, drummer for Led Zeppelin
