= John Marshall (biographer) =

British naval officer and biographer

Ltnt John Marshall
- Born: c. 1784
- Died: 1837
- Military career
- Branch: Royal Navy
- Service years: 1793 – between 1815 and 1823
- Rank: Lieutenant (from 1815)
- Known for: Publishing Royal Naval Biography

John Marshall (c.1784–1837) was an English officer in the Royal Navy who became a biographer of British naval officers.

== Life ==
Probably born in 1784, Marshall is likely to have started his service with the Royal Navy in 1793 as a child during the French Revolutionary Wars. According to Marshall, he "went to sea at nine years of age, and served during the whole of the late war in vessels of a class to which no schoolmaster is allowed". He probably served on sloops, cutters, or other small craft.

On 14 February 1815, Marshall was promoted to the rank of lieutenant and probably retired then with a pension.

In 1823, Marshall published the Royal Naval Biography, or Memoirs of the Services of all the Flag-Officers ... Post Captains, and Commanders whose names appeared on the Admiralty List of Sea Officers at the commencement of the present year (1823), or who have since been promoted.

Marshall published new editions of this work until 1835, extending to twelve octavo volumes. Much of the biographical material was contributed by the officers themselves, although Marshall did include copies of official or private letters, and other documents.

Marshall died in early 1837.
