= Glory (1802 ship) =

History

United Kingdom
- Name: Glory
- Owner: EIC voyage #1:Joseph Dorin; EIC voyage #2:William Smith; EIC voyage #3:William Borradaile
- Builder: John Bass, Topsham, Devon
- Launched: 5 April 1802
- Fate: Foundered November 1808

General characteristics
- Tons burthen: 502, or 538, or 53856/94 or 540, or 549 (bm)
- Length: Overall:117 ft 1 in (35.7 m); Keel:92 ft 8 1/8 in (28.2 m)
- Beam: 31 ft 11 in (9.7 m)
- Depth of hold: 13 ft 3 in (4.0 m)
- Complement: 1803:50; 1805:50
- Armament: 1803:16 ×12-pounder guns; 1805:16 ×12-pounder guns
- Notes: Three decks

Glory was an East Indiaman launched in 1802. She made two complete voyages as an "extra ship" for the British East India Company (EIC) before she disappeared in November 1808 while homeward bound from her third voyage. On her second voyage she participated in the British expedition to capture the Cape of Good Hope.

== Career ==
The EIC on 1 April 1803 accepted Joseph Dorin's tender of £13 14s 6d per ton, peacetime freight, for 540 tons. Before she left on her first voyage for the EIC, the EIC had Wells repair her.

=== EIC voyage #1 (1803–1805) ===
Captain Thomas Rumbold Taylor acquired a letter of marque on 25 Nay 1803. He sailed from Plymouth on 17 July 1803, bound for Madras and Ceylon. Glory reached Rio de Janeiro on 24 September and Madras on 3 February 1804. There Captain Taylor accepted a challenge to a duel from Major William Davison. The duel took place on 4 March, with the result that Davison killed Taylor, who was aged 28. Glory's First Mate was John Perry.

Glory arrived at Colombo on 22 April. She returned to Madras on 13 May. Homeward bound, she reached St Helena on 17 November, and arrived at The downs on 8 February 1805.

=== EIC voyage #2 (1805–1807) ===
Captain Horatio Beevor acquired a letter of marque on 21 May. He sailed from The Downs on 13 June 1805. Glory was one of the EIC vessels that were part of the expedition under General Sir David Baird and Admiral Sir Home Riggs Popham that would in 1806 capture the Dutch Cape Colony. They would carry supplies and troops to the Cape, and then continue on their voyages. Glory was ultimately bound for Madras and Bengal.

Glory was at Cork on 31 August, and Madeira on 29 September. She and the fleet were at St Salvador Bay on 10 November and the Cape of Good Hope on 11 January 1806.

After the Dutch Governor Jansens signed a capitulation on 18 January 1806, and the British established control of the Cape Colony, Belliqueux escorted the East Indiamen to Madras.

Glory reached Madras on 22 April. At Madras, the captains of the eight East Indiamen in the convoy joined together to present Captain George Byng, of Belliqueux, a piece of silver plate worth £100 as a token of appreciation for his conduct while they were under his orders. Byng wrote his thank you letter to them on 24 April.

Glory arrived at Calcutta on 14 May. Homeward bound, she was at Saugor on 20 September and Madras again on 9 October. She was at Trincomalee on 18 October and the Cape on 30 December. She reached St Helena on 23 January 1807 and arrived at The Downs on 12 April.

=== EIC voyage #3 (1807–1808 ) ===
Captain Beevor sailed from Portsmouth on 15 September 1807, bound for Madras and Bengal. She was reported well on 28 November at 30°10′S 5°20′W. She was in convoy with Northampton, Sarah Christiana, Ann, Union, Diana, and Sir William Pulteney. Their escort was the 64-gun third rate HMS Monmouth.

Glory reached Madras on 16 February 1808 and arrived at Calcutta on 10 March.

== Fate ==
Glory was homeward bound with the returning fleet of Indiamen that left Bengal on 25 October. She, Experiment, and Lord Nelson parted company with the fleet in a gale between 20 and 23 November, at 8°30′S 80°00′E. None of the three vessels was ever heard of again.

The EIC put the value of the lost cargoes at £63,468, £12,470, and £11,875 for Lord Nelson, Experiment, and Glory. The EIC declared that the value of its cargo on Glory was £5,292.

== See also ==
- List of people who disappeared mysteriously at sea
