= Henry Bonham (politician) =

British politician (1765–1830)

Henry Bonham (31 July 1765 – 9 April 1830) was an English merchant and Member of Parliament.

== Life ==
Bonham was born on 31 July 1765, the third son of Samuel Bonham, a London merchant and shipowner, and Sarah, née Richardson. He followed his father into the London business community, and by 1793 was a merchant and insurance broker. He became a director of the East India Dock Company in 1803, and by 1812 owned nine ships engaged in East Indian commerce. Bonham's younger brother George, a captain in the East India Company's service, was lost in 1810 when commanding the True Briton during a gale in the China Sea.

Standing for Parliament on a number of occasions, in 1802 Bonham unsuccessfully contested Newark. He was then a Member of Parliament (MP) for Leominster from 1806 to 1812, for Sandwich from 1824 to 1826, and for Rye from 1826 until he resigned his seat in March 1830, shortly before his death in April 1830.

Bonham was not closely aligned to a political party, and stated on his nomination for Sandwich in February 1824 that his "principles are those of perfect independence, unconnected with any party, [giving] a free, honest, unbiased vote." The grandson of a slave trade sea captain, Bonham was an abolitionist, presenting a petition to the House of Commons for the abolition of slavery in March 1824. In the same year, his eldest daughter Charlotte married Lord Garvagh, the cousin of the future prime minister, George Canning.

Bonham died at Hastings on 9 April 1830, aged 64.

== Family ==
Bonham married 8 December 1802 Charlotte Elizabeth Morrice, daughter of Rev. James Morrice, of Betteshanger, Kent. They left several children, including:

- Rosabelle Charlotte Isabella Bonham (d. 1891), who married in 1824 George Canning, 1st Baron Garvagh (1778–1840), and left children
- Marianne Jane Bonham (1807–1893); who married William Peters, and left children
- Edward Walter Bonham (1809–1886)
- Charles Wright Boham (1817–1910), twice married
- Flora M. E. Bonham (ca 1819-1900)

His nephew (by his brother George Bonham d. 1810) was Sir George Bonham, 1st Baronet (1803–1863).

== East Indiamen owned by Henry Bonham ==
- Abercrombie Robinson (1826–1829)
- Asia (1806–1809)
- Asia (1811–1831)
- Calcutta (1805–1809)
- Edinburgh (1825–1834)
- Essex (1803–1821)
- Hugh Inglis (1806–1817)
- Kent (1800)
- Lord Castlereagh (1802–1820)
- Lord Melville (1803–1817)
- Lord Nelson (1804–1808)
- Marquis of Wellington (1812–1832)
- Prince Regent (1811–1829)
- Union (1805–1815)
- William Pitt (1805–1816)

Parliament of the United Kingdom
Preceded by William Lamb; Sir John Lubbock, Bt	Member of Parliament for Leominster; 1806 – 1812; With: Sir John Lubbock, Bt	Succeeded by John Lubbock (younger); John Harcourt
Preceded by Joseph Marryat; Sir George Warrender, Bt	Member of Parliament for Sandwich; 1824 – 1826; With: Sir George Warrender, Bt	Succeeded by Sir George Warrender, Bt; Joseph Marryat (younger)
Preceded by Peter Browne; Robert Knight	Member of Parliament for Rye; 1826 – 1830; With: Richard Arkwright	Succeeded by Richard Arkwright; Philip Pusey
