= Diana (1799 ship) =

History

Great Britain
- Name: Diana
- Owner: EIC voyages 1–3: William Syme; EIC voyage 4: John McNabb
- Builder: Pitcher, Northfleet
- Launched: 3 June 1799
- Fate: Condemned June 1818

General characteristics
- Tons burthen: 605, or 60538/94, or 620, or 626, or 640 (bm)
- Length: Overall:146 ft 6 in (44.7 m); Keel:110 ft 0 in (33.5 m)
- Beam: 32 ft 2 in (9.8 m)
- Depth of hold: 12 ft 10 in (3.9 m)
- Complement: 1799:40; 1805:55; 1810:57; 1812:55
- Armament: 1799: 22 × 18&12&9&6-pounder cannons; 1805:12 × 18-pounder guns; 1810:4 × 6-pounder guns + 12 × 18-pounder carronades; 1812:4 × 6-pounder guns + 12 × 18-pounder carronades

Diana was launched in 1799 as a West Indiaman. From 1805 she made four voyages as an East Indiaman under charter to the British East India Company. She made a fifth voyage to India in 1817 under a license from the EIC. She ran into difficulties in the Hooghly River while homeward bound and was condemned in Bengal in June 1818.

== Career ==
Diana first appeared in Lloyd's Register (LR) in 1799 with J.Wilson, master, J. Potts, owner, and trade London–Jamaica. Captain John Emperor Willson acquired a letter of marque on 21 September 1799.=

| Year | Master | Owner | Trade | Source |
|---|---|---|---|---|
| 1800 | J.E.Wilson | Glenny & Co., | London–Jamaica | LR |
| 1805 | J.E.Wilson; J.Eckford | Glenay & Co., | London–Jamaica | LR |

In London, Peter F. Maester fitted her out for the London to India trade. He tendered her to the EIC, which accepted her on 19 February 1805, for three voyages at a rate of £14 p13s per ton for 600 tons peace freight, with war contingencies of £11 2s per ton for war contingencies of the first voyage.

1st EIC voyage (1805–1807): Captain John Eckford acquired a letter of marque on 31 May 1805. He sailed from Portsmouth on 27 September 1805, bound for Madras and Bengal. Diana was at São Tiago on 21 October. She reached Madras on 11 February 1806, and arrived at Diamond Harbour on 25 March. She was at Kidderpore on 16 May. Homeward bound, she was at Saugor on 14 August. She returned to Madras on 9 October, and stopped Trincomalee on 18 October and the Cape - on 31 December. She reached St Helena on 23 January 1807, and arrived on 15 April, at Long Reach.

2nd EIC voyage (1807–1809): Captain John Marshall sailed from Portsmouth on 15 September 1807, bound for Madras and Bengal. Diana was at Madeira on 27 September, reached Madras on 17 February 1808, and arrived at Calcutta on 10 March. On 18 May, she was at Diamond Harbour, on 4 June Saugor, on 15 June Diamond Harbour again, and on 7 August Saugor again. She was at Madras on 9 September and the Cape on 23 January 1809 Cape. She reached St Helena on 7 March, and arrived at Blackwall on 24 May. On 13 May she had come into Plymouth under jury-masts as a gale had taken away all her masts.

3rd EIC voyage (1810–1811): Captain Marshall acquired a letter of marque on 9 March 1810. Diana sailed from Portsmouth on 11 May 1810, bound for Madras and Bengal. She was at Madeira on 27 May, reached Madras on 26 September, and arrived at Ganjam on 11 November. Homeward bound, she left Bengal on 13 March 1811, reached St Helena on 18 June, and arrived at Blackwall on 2 September.

4th EIC voyage (1812–1814): Captain David Bowman acquired a letter of marque on 23 April 1812. He sailed from Falmouth on 15 May 1812, bound for Batavia and Bengal. Diana was at Madeira on 3 June, reached Batavia on 1 October, and arrived at Calcutta on 14 March 1813, Calcutta. Homeward bound, she was at Saugor on 30 June, Saugor and the Cape on 7 October, reached St Helena on 27 October, and arrived at Blackwall on 18 May.

Diane disappeared from the registers between 1815 and 1817. She may have served as a government transport.

Diana, Rutter, master sailed to India on 10 July 1817, under a license from the EIC. She was at Portsmouth on 15 July, and arrived at Bengal around 7 December. Although LR carried her until 1821, the listing was based on stale data.

| Year | Master | Owner | Trade | Source & notes |
|---|---|---|---|---|
| 1818 | W.Rutter | Glenny & Co., | London–India | LR; good repair 1815 |
| 1821 | W.Rutter | J.Campbell | London–India | LR; good repair 1815 |

== Fate ==
On 3 November 1818, Lloyd's List (LL) reported that on 25 May, Diana, Rutter, master, had put back to Bengal after leaving for London. She was severely damaged and it was expected that she would be condemned. A letter dated Calcutta, 15 June, reported that Diana had on 6 June run upon the John and Mary's Sand. It was expected that she would be gotten off on 16 June. However, an addendum to the report stated that she had returned to Calcutta and been condemned prior to 28 June.

Lloyd's Register for 1821 carried the annotation "condemned" next to her entry.
