= HMS Belliqueux (1780) =

Ship of the line of the Royal Navy

- Belliqueux

History

Great Britain
- Name: HMS Belliqueux
- Namesake: Belliqueux is french for Belligerent or Warlike
- Ordered: 19 February 1778
- Builder: Perry, Blackwall Yard
- Laid down: June 1778
- Launched: 5 June 1780
- Honours and awards: Participated in: Battle of Fort Royal; Battle of the Saintes
- Fate: Broken up, 1816
- Notes: Prison ship from 1814

General characteristics
- Class & type: Ardent-class ship of the line
- Tons burthen: 1379 (bm)
- Length: 160 ft (48.8 m) (gundeck)
- Beam: 44 ft 4 in (13.5 m)
- Depth of hold: 19 ft (5.8 m)
- Propulsion: Sails
- Sail plan: Full-rigged ship
- Armament: Gundeck: 26 × 24-pounder guns; Upper gundeck: 26 × 18-pounder guns; QD: 10 × 4-pounder guns; Fc: 2 × 9-pounders

HMS Belliqueux (Eng. warlike) was a 64-gun third rate ship of the line of the Royal Navy, launched on 5 June 1780 at Blackwall Yard, London. She was named after the French ship Belliqueux captured in 1758.

In 1781 Belliqueux took part at the Battle of Fort Royal, and in 1782 she was at the Battle of the Saintes.

In 1796 she came under the command of Captain John Inglis who commanded her bravely during the Battle of Camperdown in October 1797.

At the action of 4 August 1800, Belliqueux captured the French frigate Concorde.

After the Dutch Governor Jansens signed a capitulation on 18 January 1806, and the British established control of the Cape Colony, Belliqueux escorted the East Indiamen William Pitt, Jane, Duchess of Gordon, Sir William Pulteney, and Comet to Madras. The convoy included the Northampton, Streatham, Europe, Union, Glory, and Sarah Christiana.

At Madras, the captains of the eight East Indiamen in the convoy joined together to present Captain George Byng, of Belliqueux, a piece of silver plate worth £100 as a token of appreciation for his conduct while they were under his orders. Byng wrote his thank you letter to them on 24 April.

Philip Dundas, Lieutenant-Governor of Penang died on-board Belliqueux on 8 April 1807, while Belliqueux was in the Bay of Bengal.

Belliqueux was employed as a prison ship from 1814, and was broken up in 1816.
