= Europe (1803 EIC ship) =

British East Indiaman (1803–1824)

History

United Kingdom
- Name: Europe
- Owner: 1803:P.W.Mellish; 1818:J. Short
- Operator: British India Company
- Builder: Perry, Blackwall
- Launched: 26 January 1803
- Fate: Last listed 1824

General characteristics
- Type: East Indiaman
- Tons burthen: 824, or 82456/94 or 880, or 888 (bm)
- Length: 146 ft 3 1/2 in (44.6 m) (overall); 118 ft 9 1/2 in (36.2 m) (keel)
- Beam: 36 ft 1 1/2 in (11.0 m)
- Depth of hold: 14 ft 9 in (4.5 m)
- Sail plan: Full-rigged ship
- Complement: 110
- Armament: 26 × 18-pounder guns + 6 swivel guns
- Notes: Three decks

Europe was launched in 1803 as an East Indiaman for the British East India Company (EIC). She made six voyages for the EIC. On her third voyage the French captured her, but the British Royal Navy recaptured her some months later. In 1817 her owners sold her for a hulk but new owners continued to sail her between London and India. She is last listed in 1824.

== Career ==
=== EIC voyage #1 (1803-1804) ===
Captain William Gelston sailed from The Downs on 6 May 1803, bound for Madras, Bengal, and Benkulen. She reached Madras on 29 August and arrived at Diamond Harbour on 26 September. Homeward bound via Benkulen, she was at Saugor on 1 February 1804. She reached Benkulen on 14 May and St Helena on 14 August. She arrived at Long Reach on 16 November.

=== EIC voyage #2 (1805-1807) ===
Captain Gelston acquired a letter of marque on 22 July 1805. He sailed from Cork on 31 August, bound for Madras, Penang, and Bengal. Europe stopped at Madeira on 29 September.

Europe was one of the EIC vessels that were part of the expedition under General Sir David Baird and Admiral Sir Home Riggs Popham that would in 1806 capture the Dutch Cape Colony. They would carry supplies and troops to the Cape, and then continue on their voyages.

At 3:30 a.m. on 1 November, near Rocas Atoll at 3°51′27″N 33°48′57″W, HMS Leda, one of the convoy escorts, sighted breakers and fired a gun, the signal to tack; she herself barely missed the danger. King George was unable to tack and wrecked. As Britannia was on the point of tacking she ran afoul of Streatham and lost her bowsprit and foretopmast. She then drifted on to the atoll where she lost her rudder and bilged. In the morning Leda was able to rescue the survivors from King George and Comet, Europe, and Varuna sent their boats and were able to rescue about 400 people from Britannia, including Captain Brisk, his crew, and recruits for the EIC's armies. Leda sent her boats to the atoll where they rescued the people from King George. The total deaths from the two wrecks were only three.

Europe and the rest of the fleet arrived at San Salvadore on 11 November, and the Cape of Good Hope on 4 January 1806.

The British fleet arrived in Table Bay on 5 January 1806 and anchored off Robben Island. After Jansens, the Dutch Governor, signed a capitulation on the 18 January, and the British established control of the Cape Colony, Belliqueux escorted the East Indiamen to Madras.

Europe arrived at Madras on 22 April. At Madras, the captains of the eight East Indiamen in the convoy joined together to present Captain George Byng, of Belliqueux, a piece of silver plate worth £100 as a token of appreciation for his conduct while they were under his orders. Byng wrote his thank you letter to them on 24 April.

Europe then stopped at Penang on 4 June, before arriving at Diamond Harbour on 26 July. Homeward bound, she was at Saugor on 3 September. She stopped at Vizagapatam on 21 September, Madras again on 4 October, and the Cape on 30 December. She reached St Helena on 23 January 1807 and arrived at Purfleet on 15 April.

=== EIC voyage #3 (1808-1810) ===
Captain Gelston sailed from Portsmouth on 15 April 1808, bound for St Helena and Bengal. Europe and four other Indiamen, Streatham, Lord Keith, Monarch, and Earl Spencer were expected to sail from Bengal on 30 April under convoy by HMS Victor.

On 2 May 1809 they departed from the Sandheads with several smaller vessels as well. On 24 May a storm split the convoy and Victor and the small ships separately lost touch with the Indiamen. Monarch had a leak that had worsened. Captain John Dale, of Streatham, the senior EIC captain of the five vessels and so commodore, gave Monarch permission to sail to Penang. Captain Hawes requested that another of the Indiamen accompany him in case Monarch foundered. Dale detailed Earl Spencer to go with Monarch. Streatham, Europe, and Lord Keith continued on their way while hoping to meet up with Victor. They did not.

The French frigate Caroline captured Europe and Streatham on 31 May in 9°S 91°E. Europe resisted and in the engagement she had two British seamen killed and one lascar wounded out of 128 people on board. Kelston gave the breakdown of the people on board as 41 British, 31 foreign, and 56 lascars. Gelston remarked that in the action the lascars only got in the way.

Lord Keith too exchanged broadsides with Caroline and was damaged, however she escaped and sailed to Penang to repair.

Caroline took all the Europeans from her prizes on board and put a prize crew on Europe. She was badly holed and Captain Féretier of Caroline had to have some of her guns thrown overboard to lighten her. When the prisoners arrived at Saint-Paul Captain Gelston and Captain Dale wrote a joint letter of thanks to Captain Féretier for the kind and humane treatment they received from him, his officers, and men.

The British recaptured Streatham and Europe during the raid on Saint-Paul on the Île Bonaparte on 21 September. The British raiding party burned the warehouses where the captors had stored the silk and other valuable parts of the cargo from both Stratham and Europe.

The French recorded the cargoes as comprising 1698 boxes of indigo, 1514 bales of piece goods, 1843 bales of silk, 11,000 bags of saltpetre, and 25 bales of handkerchiefs. The EIC gave the value of the cargo it had lost on the two Indiamen at £140,000 per vessel. The EIC did not insure its vessels or cargoes.

Lloyd's List (LL) reported on 9 January 1811 that the captured vessels, except for Europe, which had been sent to Bombay, had all arrived at the Cape of Good Hope.

Streatham then completed her voyage under Dale's command. Europe, under Gelston's command, sailed to Bombay to get a new cargo, reaching there on 22 December. Homeward bound again, she reached St Helena on 3 May 1810 and arrived at Long Reach on 9 July.

=== EIC voyage #4 (1811-1812) ===
Captain Gelstson sailed from Torbay 12 May 1811, bound for Madras and Bengal. Europe reached Madras on 10 September and arrived at Diamond Harbour on 11 October. Homeward bound, she was at Saugor on November, Vizagapatam on 7 July 1812, and Masulipatam on 18 January 1812. She reached Madras on 25 January and St Helena on 11 May. She arrived at Long reach on 24 July.

=== EIC voyage #5 (1814-1815) ===
Captain Geltson sailed from Portsmouth on 22 February 1814, bound for Madras and Bengal. Europe was at Johanna on 6 June and Madras on 4 July. She arrived at Diamond Harbour on 29 July. Homeward bound, she was at Saugor on 10 October and reached the Cape of Good Hope on 26 March 1815. She reached St Helena on 22 April and arrived at Long reach on 25 June.

=== EIC voyage #6 (1815-1817) ===
Captain John Mills sailed from the Downs on 15 November 1815, bound for Madras, Bengal, and Batavia. Europe reached the Cape on 29 January 1816. She was at Madras on 12 April, Penang on 22 May, and Malacca on 3 June. She arrived at Batavia on 26 June. She was at Kidderpore on 4 October. Homeward bound, she was at Saugor on 11 November, reached St Helena on 19 March 1817, and arrived at Blackwall on 25 May.

== Later career and fate ==
In 1817 Europe was sold for use as a hulk. However, her new owners continued to use her as a merchantman, trading with India under a license from the EIC. She appeared in Lloyd's Register (LR) in 1818 with T. Ashton, master, J. Short, owner, and trade London–India. Europe made only one voyage to Bengal, via Madras leaving in 1818 and returning in early 1819. Thereafter, there is no mention in Lloyd's List of any voyages.

Even so, the information in the registers remained unchanged until her last listing in LR in 1823 and in the Register of Shipping in 1824.
