= Home Riggs Popham =

Royal Navy officer and politician (1762–1820)

Rear-Admiral Sir Home Riggs Popham KCB KCH FRS
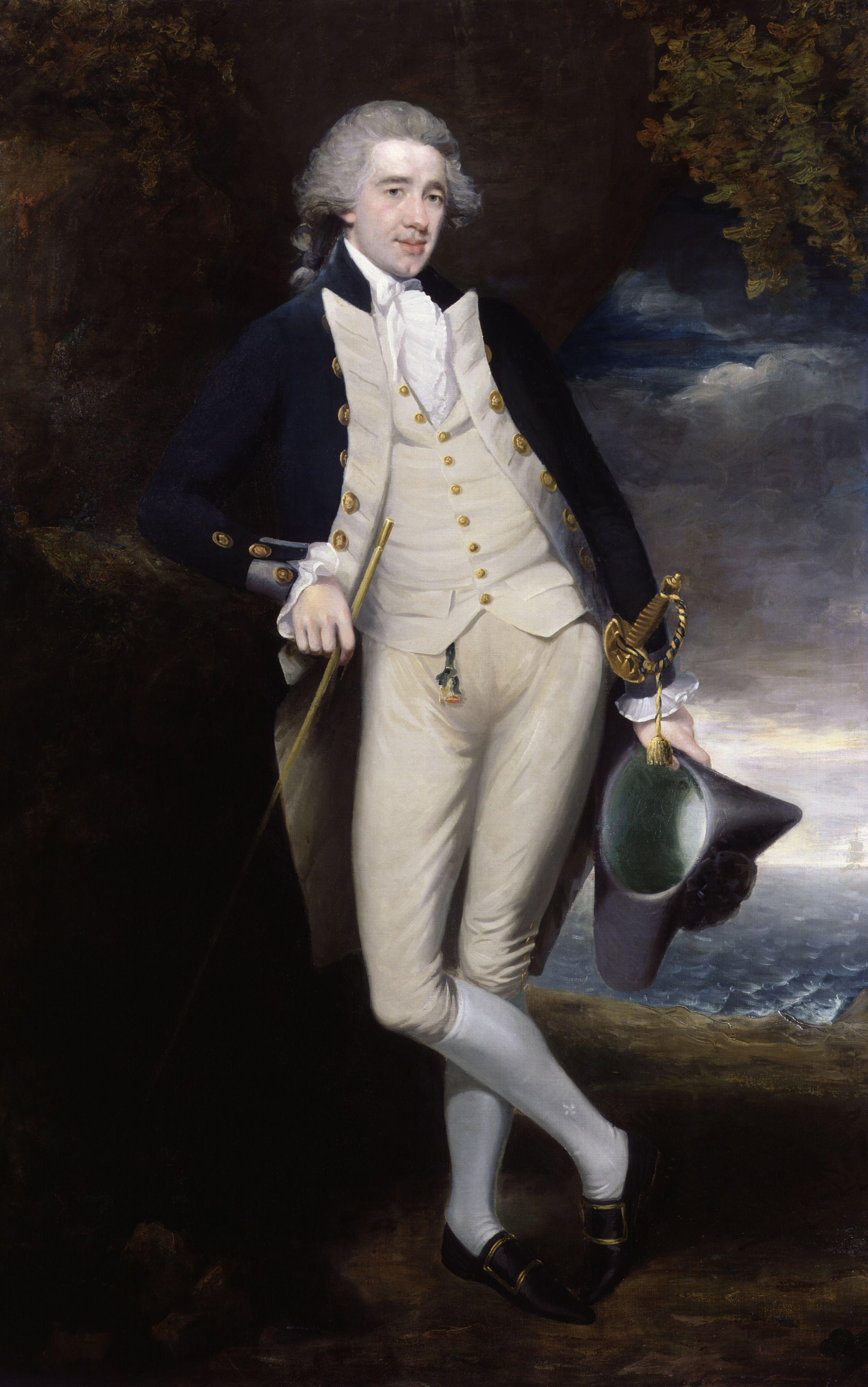
- c. 1783 portrait
- Born: 12 October 1762; Gibraltar
- Died: 20 September 1820 (aged 57); Cheltenham, Gloucestershire
- Military career
- Allegiance: Great Britain; United Kingdom
- Branch: Royal Navy
- Service years: 1778–1820
- Rank: Rear-Admiral of the White
- Commands: Cape of Good Hope Station; Jamaica Station
- Conflicts: American War of Independence; French Revolutionary Wars; Expedition to Ostend; Anglo-Russian invasion of Holland; Battle of Krabbendam; Battle of Alkmaar (1799); Battle of Copenhagen (1801); Napoleonic Wars; Battle of Blaauwberg; British invasions of the River Plate; Battle of Copenhagen (1807); Peninsular War
- Awards: Knight Commander of the Order of the Bath

Rear-Admiral of the White Sir Home Riggs Popham, KCB, KCH FRS (12 October 1762 – 20 September 1820) was a Royal Navy officer and politician who served in the American War of Independence and French Revolutionary and Napoleonic Wars. He is known for his scientific accomplishments, particularly the development of a signal code that was adopted by the Royal Navy in 1803.

== Early life ==
=== Childhood ===
Home Popham was born in Gibraltar on 12 October 1762, the fifteenth child of Joseph Popham, British consul at Tétouan in Morocco, and his first wife Mary, née Riggs. It is likely that the child's first name was chosen to honour Gibraltar's former Governor William Home. Mary Popham died an hour after Home was born, from complications associated with the birth. Nine months later Joseph married Catherine Lamb, who became responsible for raising Home and his siblings. The couple also had six more children.

In 1769 Joseph Popham was forced to resign as consul after a personal dispute with the Moroccan Sultan regarding piracy against English merchantmen. The British Government subsequently blamed Joseph Popham for the disagreement, with Gibraltar Governor Edward Cornwallis describing him as an "honest well meaning man" who had met with "little success" and was henceforth "an improper person to serve His Majesty [as consul]." The Popham family returned to England, settling first in Chichester and then Guernsey. Joseph sought further diplomatic postings but was successful only in securing an annual government pension of £200 which was insufficient to cover debts incurred during his Moroccan consulship. The family was forced to rely on income earned by Home's brothers, particularly Stephen Popham who was then a successful barrister. In 1772 Home was sent to Westminster School in London, where he remained for three years. His father Joseph died in Guernsey in 1774.

On 3 January 1776 Home was admitted to further study at Trinity College, Cambridge. His education may have been paid for by his brother Stephen or by Captain Edward Thompson, a family friend. There is no record of Home actually residing in Cambridge or attending lectures. In April 1778 he abandoned his studies and enlisted in the Royal Navy as an able seaman aboard Thompson's newly built frigate HMS Hyaena.

=== Early voyages ===
Popham served under Admiral of the White Sir George Rodney during the American War of Independence. In 1781 he was aboard HMS Shelanagig when a French fleet under François Joseph Paul de Grasse captured her near Saint Lucia. Popham was exchanged and returned to service. In 1783 he was promoted to lieutenant, and was for a time engaged on survey service on the coast of Africa. Between 1787 and 1793 he was engaged in a series of commercial ventures in the Eastern Sea, sailing, first for the Imperial Ostend Company, and then in Etrusco, a vessel that he purchased and in part loaded himself.

During this time he took several surveys and rendered some services to the British East India Company, which were officially acknowledged. In 1793, however, his ship was seized, partly on the grounds that he was carrying contraband, and partly because he was infringing the East India Company's monopoly. The value of his loss was put at £70,000, and he was entangled in litigation. In 1805 he obtained compensation to the amount of £25,000. The case was a hard one, for he was undoubtedly sailing with the knowledge of officials in British India.

== Service in the wars with France ==
While this dispute was going on Popham had resumed his career as a naval officer. He served with the army under the Duke of York in Flanders as "superintendent of Inland Navigation" and won his confidence. The protection of the duke was exercised with so much effect that Popham was promoted commander in 1794 and post captain in 1795. He was then engaged for several years in co-operating in a naval capacity with the troops of Great Britain and her allies.

His bills for the repair of his ship at Calcutta were the excuse for an attack on him and for charging him with the amount. It was just the time of the general reform of the dockyards, and there was much suspicion in the air. It was also the case that Lord St. Vincent did not like Popham, and that Benjamin Tucker (1762–1829), secretary to the admiralty, who had been the admiral's secretary, was his creature and sycophant. However, Popham was not the man to be snuffed out without an effort. He brought his case before Parliament, and was able to prove that there had been, if not deliberate dishonesty, at least the very grossest carelessness on the part of his assailants.

In the spring of 1798 the Admiralty created the Sea Fencibles, a force of coastal militia, following a plan by Popham. On 8 May 1798 Home Popham led an expedition to Ostend to destroy the sluice gates of the Bruge canal. The expedition landed a contingent of 1,300 British Army soldiers under the command of Major General Coote. The troops burnt some ships in the harbour before blowing up locks and gates on the canal. His force then surrounded had to surrender as adverse winds prevented their re-embarkation. It was during this period perhaps in captivity, before being returned home that Popham began work on a standard signal instructions handbook for the Royal Navy. Ship to ship communication was very haphazard: a fleet system that protected vulnerable frigates on station was essential to save time and material. The global character of the navy required linking to larger fleet formations. During the 1799 Anglo-Russian invasion of Holland, Popham's gunboats played an important role in assisting York's army in suppressing the French at Krabbendam and Alkmaar. During service on HMS Romney in the Battle of Copenhagen Popham tested his telegraphic equipment. He acted as liaison officer to the Danish Court off station from Elsinore. Popham was under the direction of Admiral Archibald Dickson when he devised the two or three flag hoist, in which each sign was a number, and each combination a different state of readiness. The vocabulary was limited and totally nautical, apposite to a direct command. At Copenhagen boats could be sent ashore, but were unnecessary using only flag signals. Popham was deeply encouraged by Lord Spencer, 1st Lord of the Admiralty who advised publication of the signal books. The new signals were immensely useful to Nelson at Trafalgar in developing navy tactics in secret. Popham proved McArthur, his critic and rival, wrong; Popham's books were printed several times after the battle.

=== Red Sea expedition ===
In early 1801 Popham brought out to the Cape of Good Hope several regiments. He then embarked the 22nd and 61st Regiments of Foot and the garrison on his transports and was expected on 28 February to leave on a secret expedition. At the time the speculation was that he would sail to attack the Spanish colonies in the Río de la Plata.

Instead, Popham sailed to the Red Sea to support General Baird's expedition to Egypt to help General Ralph Abercromby expel the French there. On 23 May 1801, he drew 6,000 Spanish dollars for His Majesty's ships on the expedition from the treasury on Cuvera while she was in the Judda roads.

On 14 June 1802 the transport Calcutta wrecked on the Egyptian coast in the Red Sea. She was carrying 331 men of the 80th Regiment of Foot and 79 native Indian followers. Romney arrived the next day, as did two transports. Only Romney was able to get her boats out but they were able to rescue and deliver to the shore all but seven men who had died in an early attempt to reach shore. Popham, in Romney, left HMS Duchess of York to salvage anything that could be salvaged and then sailed to Suez from whence he dispatched HMS Wilhelmina to pick up the troops on the 15th and carry them back to India.

=== Río de la Plata expedition ===
Commissioned by prime minister Pitt in 1805 to study the military plans being proposed by Venezuelan revolutionary Francisco de Miranda to the British Government, Popham then persuaded the authorities that, as the Spanish Colonies were discontented, it would be easy to promote a rising in Buenos Aires. After capturing the Dutch Cape Colony with Sir David Baird in January 1806, he led the first of the British invasions of the River Plate, transporting General Beresford's brigade of 1,500 men with his squadron. Over 100 men died from sickness leaving 1,400 weakened soldiers when they arrived; but the Spanish colonists, though discontented, were not disposed to accept British rule. They rose up against the soldiers who had landed, and took them prisoners. Popham's ships bombarded the taken citadel, but he was recalled, and censured by a court martial for leaving his station. In spite of his embarrassment the City of London presented him with a sword of honour for his endeavours to "open new markets", and the sentence did him limited harm.

=== From Spain to North America Station ===
In 1806 Popham was appointed a groom of the bedchamber to the Duke of Gloucester. With a collaborator, John Goodhew, he published A General Code of Signals for the use of His Majesty's Navy, in which there were only twelve flags doubled backed to make twenty-four flags were used and no numbers. Variation was provided by a pendant, and changes were made to the key to maintain secrecy. But Popham's original system offered the Admiralty a huge variety of signals to be sent interpolated by tables with places marked around the world. Popham's was both complex and sophisticated for the time, but limited by a bifurcated alphabet.

In 1807 Lord Gambier appointed him captain of the fleet for the Second Copenhagen Expedition. In 1809 he went on to command HMS Venerable, which he continued to command with success against the French in Spain. Popham's instructions were in general use by 1812 throughout the Royal Navy. But there were doubters, such as a major sceptic Admiral Sir George Berkeley who refused to use the signals and could not see their point. In 1812 and 1813 he was stationed on the northern coast of Spain where he worked with the Spanish guerrillas to successfully harry the French troops and assault French fortresses on the Basque coast while Wellington was advancing through Spain. He was promoted to Rear-Admiral of the White on 4 June 1814, appointed Knight Commander of the Order of the Bath in 1815. This was capped off with a personal gift from Prince Regent in the Knight Commander of the Royal Guelphic Order in 1818. He served as Commander-in-Chief, Jamaica Station from 1817 to 1820.

== Parliament ==
Popham was Member of Parliament (MP) for Yarmouth from 1804 to 1806, for Shaftesbury from 1806 to 1807, and for Ipswich from 1807 to 1812.

== Death and legacy ==
He died in Cheltenham on September 20, 1820 aged 57, leaving a large family. He was buried on September 25 in the churchyard of St Michael and All Angels at Sunninghill, Berkshire, close to his home, Titness Park. His wife died in Bath in 1866 at age 94.

Popham was one of the most scientific seamen of his time, and was elected FRS in 1799. He did much useful survey work, and was the author of the code using signal flags adopted by the admiralty in 1803 and used for many years. These were most famously used for the signal "England expects that every man will do his duty". Considerable opposition to the Admiralty adopting the code was presented by Admirals Hood and St Vincent. It took First Lord Sir John Laughton only 29 words to dismiss that code adopted by Admiral Nelson. It was not until 1816 that prejudice against Popham's previous court-martial was put aside and the system's brilliance fully recognized.

== Citations ==
Parliament of the United Kingdom
Preceded by John Delgano; Jervoise Clarke Jervoise	Member of Parliament for Yarmouth; 1804–1806; With: Jervoise Clarke Jervoise	Succeeded by Sir David Scott; Jervoise Clarke Jervoise
Preceded by Edward Loveden; Robert Hurst	Member of Parliament for Shaftesbury; 1806–1807; With: Edward Loveden	Succeeded by Edward Loveden; Thomas Wallace
Preceded by Richard Wilson; Robert Stopford	Member of Parliament for Ipswich; 1807–1812; With: Robert Alexander Crickitt	Succeeded by John Round; Robert Alexander Crickitt
Military offices
Preceded by Station held by Dutch Forces	Commander-in-Chief, Cape of Good Hope Station; 1806–1807	Succeeded by Charles Stirling
Preceded by John Erskine Douglas	Commander-in-Chief, Jamaica Station; 1817–1820	Succeeded by Sir Charles Rowley
