= Ocean (disambiguation) =

An ocean is a major body of salt water on Earth.

Ocean may also refer to:

== Bodies of water ==
- World Ocean, also known as Global Ocean or World Sea or simply the ocean or oceans
- The sea

== Science and astrophysics ==
- Ocean world
  - Hycean planet, planet covered in water with a hydrogen atmosphere -- an ocean planet with hydrogen atmosphere
  - Lava planet, planet covered in a lava ocean
    - Magma ocean
- Lakes of Titan, lakes of ethane and methane on the largest natural satellite of Saturn
- Liquid hydrogen on Jupiter, sometimes described as ocean-like
- Planetary oceanography

== Places ==
- Ocean (Muni), a station on the San Francisco Municipal Railway light rail network
- Océan, a department of South Province in Cameroon
- Ocean, Maryland, a small town in the United States
- Ocean Adventure, open-space marine zoological park in Subic, Philippines
- Ocean County, New Jersey, United States
- Ocean Harbour, South Georgia

== People ==
=== Given name ===
- Ocean Andrew, American politician and businessman
- Ocean Hai (born 1982), Chinese musical artist
- Ocean Hellman (born 1971), Canadian former actress
- Ocean Mercier, New Zealand academic
- Ocean Mushure (born 1985), Zimbabwean footballer
- Ocean Ramsey (born 1987), marine biologist and shark conservationist
- Ocean Robbins (born 1973), American entrepreneur and author
- Ocean Wisdom (born 1993), English rapper
- Ocean Vuong (born 1988), a Vietnamese-American writer

=== Surname ===
- Billy Ocean (born 1950), a British pop recording artist
- Danny Ocean (singer), Venezuelan singer and producer
- Frank Ocean, an American recording artist

== Arts, entertainment, and media ==
=== Music ===
==== Groups ====
- Ocean (band), a 1970s Canadian gospel rock band
- Oceán, a 1990s Czech synth-pop band
- The Ocean (band), a 2000s German post-metal band

==== Albums ====
- Ocean (Eloy album), 1977
- Ocean (Stephan Micus album), 1986
- Ocean (Bebo Norman album), 2010
- Ocean (Lady Antebellum album), 2019
- Ocean (Karol G album), 2019
- Oceans (Esprit D'Air album), 2022

==== Extended plays ====
- Oceans (EP), a 2013 EP by Hillsong United

==== Songs ====
- "Ocean" (B'z song), 2005
- "Ocean" (Calvin Harris and Jessie Reyez song), 2025
- "Ocean" (Future song), 2024
- "Ocean" (Goldfrapp song), 2017
- "Ocean" (Karol G song), 2019
- "Ocean" (Martin Garrix song), 2018
- "Ocean" (Sebadoh song), 1996
- "Ocean" (Spencer Tracy song), 2003
- ''Ocean'' (The Velvet Underground song), 1969
- "Oceans" (Coldplay song), 2014
- "Oceans" (Evanescence song), 2011
- "Oceans" (Jay-Z song), 2013
- "Oceans" (Morning Runner song), 2006
- "Oceans" (Pearl Jam song), 1992
- "Oceans" (The Tea Party song), 2005
- "Oceans (Where Feet May Fail)", a song by Hillsong United, 2013
- "The Ocean" (Led Zeppelin song), 1973
- "The Ocean" (Steve Angello song), 2015
- "The Ocean" (Against Me!), on the 2007 album New Wave
- "The Ocean" (Mike Perry song), 2016
- "Ocean", a song by Aṣa on the 2022 album V
- "Ocean", a song by Cold on the 2005 album A Different Kind of Pain
- "Oceans", a song by Dash Berlin, 2021
- "Ocean", a song by Five for Fighting on the 1997 album Message for Albert
- "Oceans", a song by The Format on the 2006 album Dog Problems
- "Oceans", a song by Gary Numan on the 1979 album The Pleasure Principle
- "Ocean", a song by the John Butler Trio on the 1998 album John Butler
- "Ocean", a song by Lady Antebellum on the 2019 album Ocean
- "Ocean", a song from Lou Reed's 1972 eponymous debut solo album
  - an earlier version recorded by the Velvet Underground is found on their box set Peel Slowly and See
- "Ocean", a song by Matt Brouwer on the 2012 album Till the Sunrise
- "Oceans", a song by MisterWives from Our Own House
- "Ocean", a song by Nmixx on the 2025 EP Fe3O4: Forward
- "Ocean", a song by RAF Camora and Ufo361, 2025
- "Oceans", a song by Rebecca Ferguson on the 2016 album Superwoman
- "Ocean", a song by Slightly Stoopid on the 2007 album Chronchitis
- "The Ocean", by Sunny Day Real Estate on the 2000 album The Rising Tide
- "Oceans", a song by Survivor on the 1986 album When Seconds Count
- "The Ocean", a song by Tegan and Sara on the 2009 album Sainthood
- "The Ocean", a song from the 1980 U2 album Boy

=== Radio stations ===
- Ocean FM (Cayman Islands), a defunct radio station in the Cayman Islands
- Ocean FM (Ireland), a local radio station that broadcasts to the northwest of Ireland
- Ocean FM (UK)

=== Television ===
- "Ocean" (Wonder Showzen episode)
- Oceans (TV series), an eight-part series on BBC Two

=== Other arts, entertainment, and media ===
- Ocean (comics), a miniseries by Warren Ellis and Chris Sprouse
- Ocean (Marvel Comics), a superhuman mutant
- Ocean Productions, an animation recording company
- Ocean Software, a video game publisher
- Oceans (film), a documentary by Jacques Perrin
- Ocean with David Attenborough, a 2025 documentary film

== Resorts ==
- Ocean Resort Casino, in Atlantic City, New Jersey

== Transport ==
=== Automobile ===
- Fisker Ocean, electric crossover SUV

=== Air transport ===
- Ocean Airlines, a cargo airline based in Brescia, Italy

=== Rail transport ===
- Ocean (train), a Canadian passenger train
- AS Ocean, a former Larvik company operating a whaling station and light railway in South Georgia

=== Ships ===
- Ocean (East Indiaman), a name given to several East Indiamen that sailed for the Honourable East India Company
- Ocean (ship), a name given to several vessels that brought convicts from Britain to Australia
- HMS Ocean, a name given to several Royal Navy vessels
- PS Ocean
- Ocean 40, an American sailboat design
- Océan-class ironclads built for the French navy
- USS Ocean, a U.S. Navy ship

== Other uses ==
- Big Five personality traits, known as the OCEAN model of personality
- Cosmic ocean, a mythological motif
- Helio Ocean, a mobile device
- Ocean Racing Technology, a Portuguese auto racing team

== See also ==
- Gyatso
- Ocean City (disambiguation)
- "Ocean Deep", a 1984 song by Cliff Richard
- Ocean Island (disambiguation)
- Ocean World (disambiguation)
- Oceana (disambiguation)
- Oceania (disambiguation)
- Oceanic (disambiguation)
- Oceanus (disambiguation)
