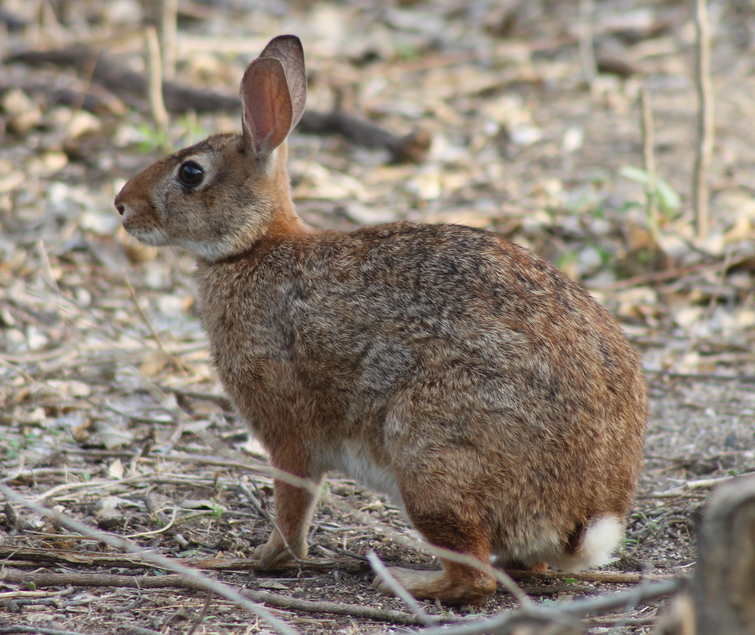
- María Madre island, Nayarit, Mexico

Conservation status
- Endangered (IUCN 3.1)

Scientific classification
- Kingdom: Animalia
- Phylum: Chordata
- Class: Mammalia
- Infraclass: Placentalia
- Order: Lagomorpha
- Family: Leporidae
- Genus: Sylvilagus
- Species: S. graysoni

Binomial name
- Sylvilagus graysoni (J. A. Allen, 1877)
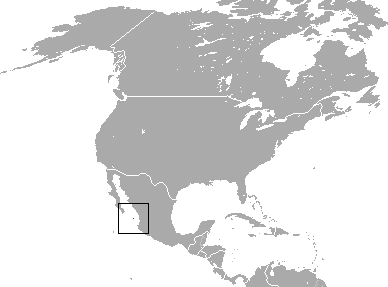
- Tres Marias cottontail range

Synonyms
- Lepus greysoni J. A. Allen, 1877

= Tres Marias cottontail =

Species of mammal from Mexico's Islas Marías

The Tres Marias cottontail or Tres Marias rabbit (Sylvilagus graysoni) is a medium-sized species of rabbit that is endemic to the Islas Marías in Mexico. Relatively unafraid of humans, the rabbit is the only member of the family Leporidae found on the islands. It prefers the island's dry, tropical forests, and regions with plenty of bushes for cover, which it will rest under for most of the day. It has few predators, with the known native species that feed on it being birds of prey and the Tres Marias raccoon, though it has been threatened by habitat loss due to human developments, as well as browsing by introduced white-tailed deer and goats. The Tres Marias cottontail is considered to be an endangered species by the Mexican government and the International Union for Conservation of Nature, and population declines have been reported across most of the species' range, with the exception of the island of San Juanito.

== Taxonomy ==
The Tres Marias cottontail was first identified by American zoologist Joel Asaph Allen in 1877, who named it "Grayson's hare" and placed it in the same genus as the hares, Lepus, giving it the scientific name Lepus graysoni. He described the type locality of the species as simply the "Tres Marias Islands". The species was named after the supplier of the type after which the species was described, ornithologist Andrew J. Grayson. Zoologist Edward William Nelson would later clarify in the 1899 work Mammals of the Tres Marias Islands that the specific island was likely María Madre. The species was reclassified as a member of Sylvilagus, the cottontail rabbits, in mammalogist Marcus Ward Lyon Jr.'s 1904 work Classification of the Hares and their Allies. It has no known fossils.

Two subspecies are recognized:

- Sylvilagus graysoni graysoni (J. A. Allen, 1877), nominate subspecies
- Sylvilagus graysoni badistes Diersing & Wilson 1980, restricted to San Juanito, named after the Greek root word badio, 'to advance slowly', referring to the subspecies' unwillingness to escape, even more so than those on other islands

== Description ==
Sylvilagus graysoni is a medium-sized cottontail rabbit. Its adult body length measures from 437 to 480 millimeters (17.2 to 18.9 inches), and it has short ears that measure from 57 to 64 mm (2.2 to 2.5 in). The skull is also of medium size, measuring from 78 to 80 mm (3.1 to 3.1 in). Its fur is rufous, and brightens near the nape and rump areas. The underside and tail is whitish, and there is a brown section present on the throat. The skin is noted as being very thin.

The skull of the Tres Marias cottontail has a long upper jaw with long incisive foramina (ducts in the palate of the mouth). There is a long gap between the incisors and premolars. The basilar part of its occipital bone is notably narrow. Similar to the marsh rabbit (S. palustris), it has bony extensions on the back of the brow (the supraorbital margin) that are fused to the rear part of the skull that surrounds the brain (the braincase). Like other rabbits and hares, it has a dental formula of 2.0.3.31.0.2.3 × 2 = 28—two pairs of upper and one pair of lower incisors, no canines, three upper and two lower premolars on each side, and three upper and lower molars on either side of the jaw.

S. graysoni is similar in shape to the closely related Mexican cottontail (S. cunicularius), which is present in mainland Mexico. It is similar to S. cunicularius in that its lower jaw is very deep, the widths of the carotid foramina are comparable, and their skulls are also of similar size. These similarities allow for specimens to be distinguished from the Eastern cottontail (S. floridanus), which has a shallow lower jaw, narrower carotid foramina, and a larger skull. The Tres Marias cottontail can be distinguished from the Mexican cottontail by its shorter ears and reddish fur on its sides. S. graysoni subspecies differ in size: S. g. badistes is slightly smaller on average compared to S. g. graysoni.

== Distribution and habitat ==
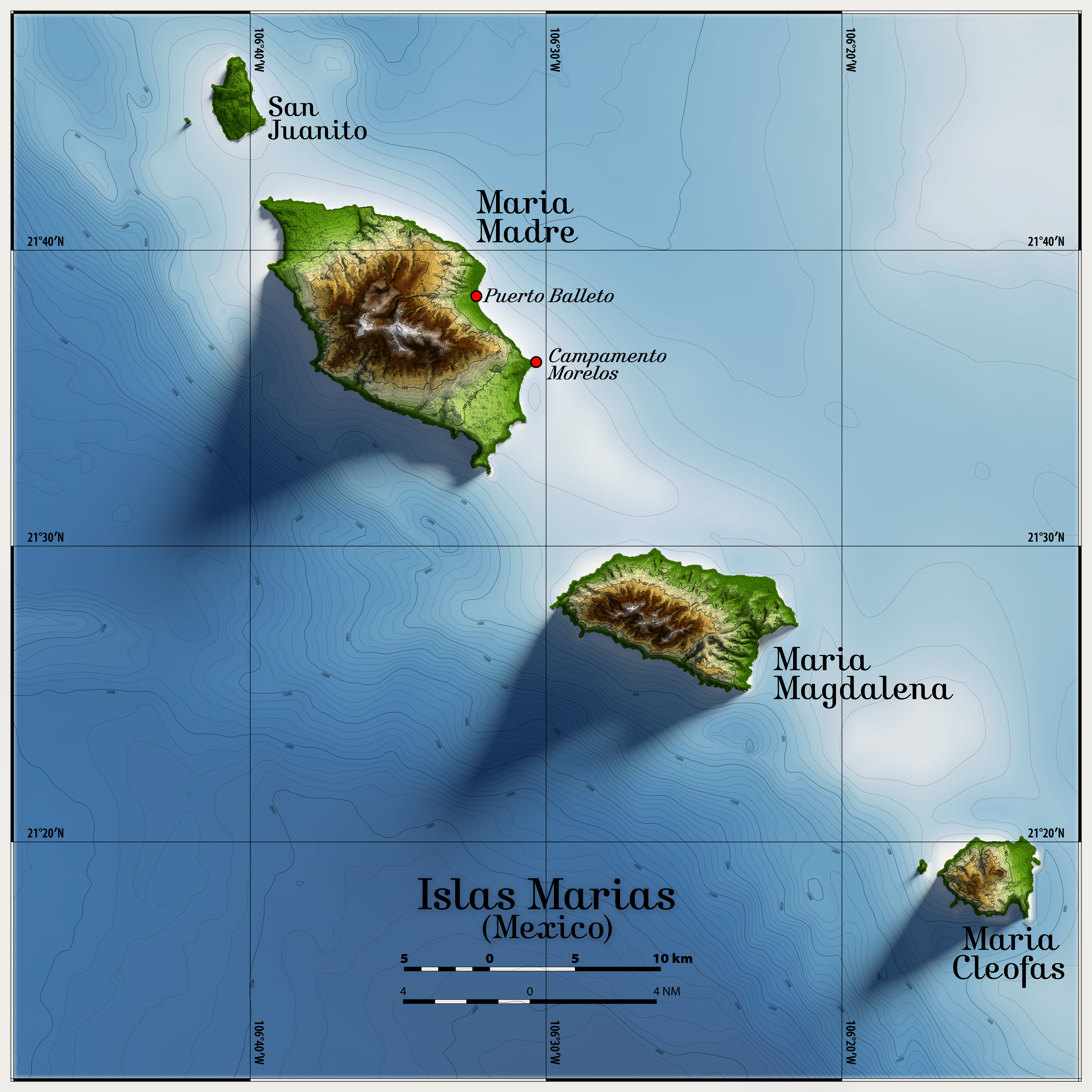
The Islas Marías archipelago is located at 21°31′N 106°29′W.

Sylvilagus graysoni is endemic to the Islas Marías, part of the Mexican state of Nayarit. A late 19th century account of the rabbit noted that it was abundantly found on both María Madre and María Magdalena, but was rarely encountered on María Cleofa. Later accounts found the species on the three northern islands, but not María Cleofa. More recent accounts describe S. graysoni as occurring on all four islands in the archipelago, with the population on San Juanito making up the subspecies S. g. badistes. The rabbit occupies a total area of less than 500 square kilometers (190 sq mi) across the islands. It is the only species in the family Leporidae found on the islands.

Its natural habitat is deciduous tropical forest, though the region it occupies on the Islas Marías is more arid than mainland Mexico. The region is dominated by plants in the genus Bursera, the false tamarind, and the chupandía. The rabbit thrives in regions of San Juanito where there are dense trees, bushes, and agaves that rise to 3–4 meters (9.8–13.1 ft) in height. It may also spread to abandoned farmlands across the islands, though it prefers areas with plenty of low bushes. It occurs from sea level up to elevations of roughly 350 meters (1,150 ft).

== Behavior and ecology ==
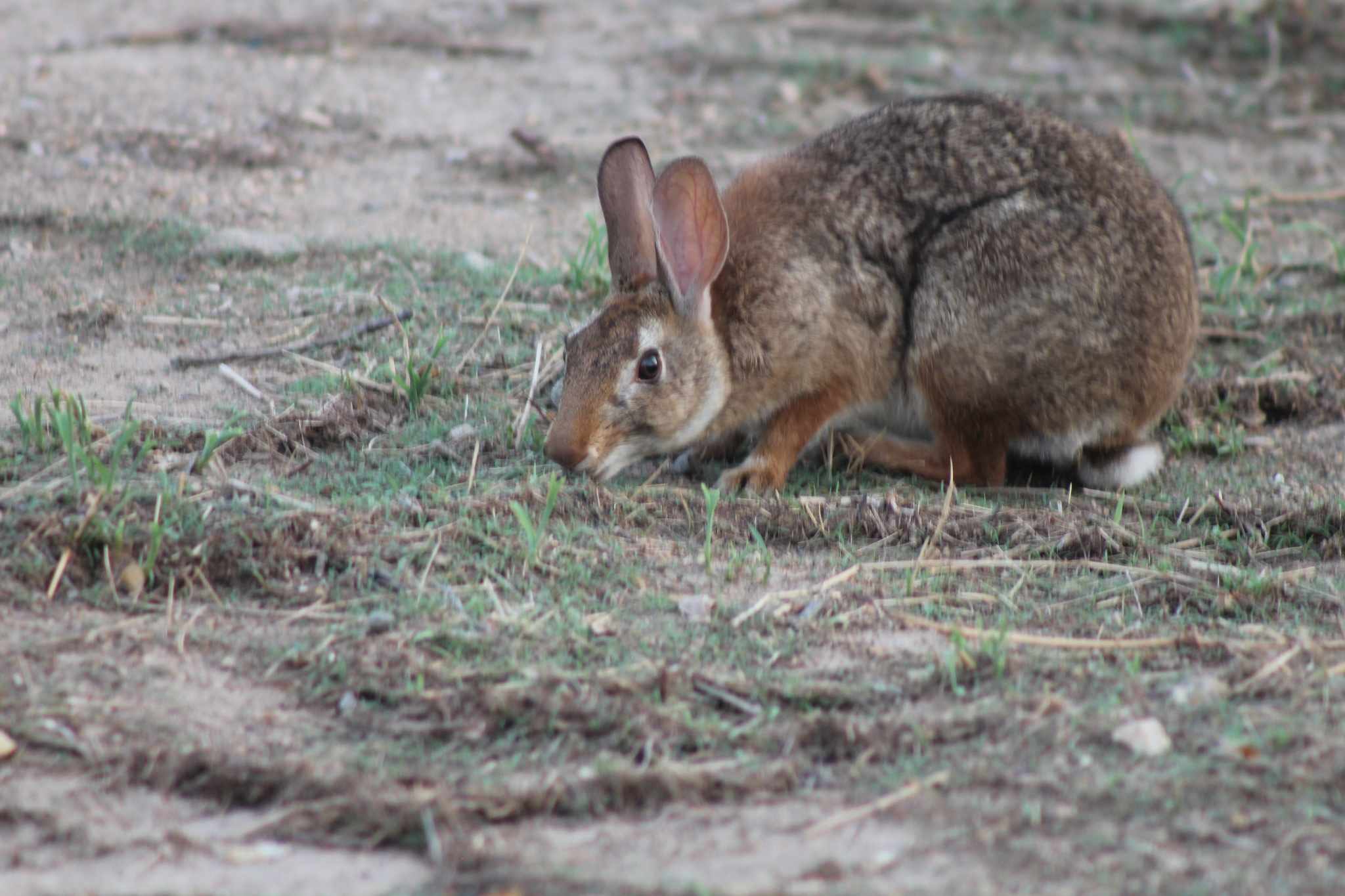
Foraging near Puerto Balleto

Due to its isolation, Sylvilagus graysoni does not fear humans like other species on the mainland. Individuals on San Juanito are notable in their lack of escape behavior. Members of this species will spend much of the day resting in shallow depressions under bushes, waiting until sunset to emerge into open areas.

The Tres Marias cottontail has few known predators. These include the Tres Marias raccoon, a subspecies of the common raccoon, and two birds of prey, the red-tailed hawk and the crested caracara.

The species' reproductive behavior is largely unknown. One expedition in March 1978 found 11 lactating females, and two females that were pregnant with 75-millimeter (3.0 in) embryos. The species has 42 diploid chromosomes, a number shared with the Mexican cottontail, the eastern cottontail and the desert cottontail (S. audubonii).

== Threats and conservation ==
Sylvilagus graysoni is threatened by habitat loss, as parts of its habitat have been repurposed for farms and the Islas Marías Federal Prison. It is hunted for its meat and fur. Introduction of non-native species (pigs, white-tailed deer, goats and black rats) to the island has posed a threat to the species, as there is increased competition for resources, which have been degraded by human removal of native plants. These non-native species also damage the available habitat through their feeding behaviors (browsing). 2019 assessments by Mexican authorities and the International Union for Conservation of Nature (IUCN) have resulted in both considering the species as endangered, with the latter citing the species' restricted habitat size and declining habitat quality as reasons for the assessment.

Tres Marias rabbits have variously been described as being abundant or only appearing on specific islands; in 1976 its numbers were found to be "low on all but one island", and a 1987 report only found the species on San Juanito. Recommendations have been made by researcher Consuelo Lorenzo and colleagues to cease hunting on the islands, create biological reserves on the San Juanito and María Madre islands, and conduct a long-term study to find out more about the rabbit's life history, which reflect earlier recommendations from researchers of the species in the 1990s. One of the islands, María Magdalena, has been designated as an ecological reserve since at least 2000, and in 2010 the islands on a whole were designated a UNESCO Biosphere Reserve.
