= Ocean (ship) =

A number of sailing ships have been named Ocean.

- Ocean (1790 ship) was a sloop launched in 1790 at Plymouth. Circa 1792 the Sierra Leone Company purchased her and sailed her in support of their colony. In 1793 the Company sent her on a voyage along the coast to trade for African commodities that she brought back to Freetown for re-export. The Company judged the experiment a success and the next year it sent several more vessels to do the same. The French captured Ocean in August 1796 and the Royal Navy recaptured her in January 1798. Her subsequent fate is obscure.
- Ocean (1799 ship) was a ship of 243 tons (bm) built in France in 1793 that the British captured in 1799. She became a whaler for Samuel Enderby & Sons and made some 11 whaling voyages to the Southern Whale Fishery between 1800 and 1824. In 1806 Captain Abraham Bristow discovered the Auckland Islands.
- Ocean (1794 ship) was built at South Shields, England. She performed two voyages as an "extra" ship for the British East India Company (EIC). Ocean continued to sail as a London-based transport until 1823.

Two ships named Ocean sailed to the East Indies under a license from the EIC. After the EIC lost its monopoly on trade with India in 1813, it licensed vessels belonging to private owners to trade with India.

- Ocean (1802 ship) was launched at Quebec. She made five voyages under charter to the British East India Company (EIC) between 1804 and 1814. Her owners then sold her and she continued to sail between Britain and India under a license issued by the EIC. In 1815–1816 she made one voyage transporting convicts to Australia. She was last listed in 1825.
- Ocean (1808 ship), a 437-ton (bm) merchant ship built at Whitby that transported convicts to Port Jackson in 1818 and 1823.

== See also ==
- HMS Ocean
- Ocean (East Indiaman)
- French ship Océan
- PS Ocean
- Ocean ship
