= Crassispira trimariana =

Scientific classification
- Kingdom: Animalia
- Phylum: Mollusca
- Class: Gastropoda
- Subclass: Caenogastropoda
- Order: Neogastropoda
- Superfamily: Conoidea
- Family: Pseudomelatomidae
- Genus: Crassispira
- Species: C. trimariana

Binomial name
- Crassispira trimariana Pilsbry & H. N. Lowe, 1932

Synonyms
- Crassispira (Monilispira) trimariana Pilsbry & H. N. Lowe, 1932

Species of gastropod

Crassispira trimariana is a species of sea snail, a marine gastropod mollusk in the family Pseudomelatomidae.

== Description ==
The length of the shell attains 11 mm, its diameter 4 mm.

== Distribution ==
This marine species occurs off the Tres Marias Islands, Pacific Ocean, Mexico.
