= Ocean (East Indiaman) =

At least four ships with the name Ocean served the Honourable East India Company as an East Indiaman between 1788 and 1810:

- Ocean (1788 EIC ship) made three voyages for the company; she was on her fourth voyage when she wrecked in February 1797 in the East Indies.
- Ocean (1794 ship), a brig of 481 tons burthen (bm) and launched in 1794, made two voyages to Bengal for the East India company as an "extra" ship, that is, on charter. In 1803, she accompanied HMS Calcutta to establish the British settlement at Port Phillip. She then made another trip for the EIC. She continued trading from London until at least 1820, but her ultimate fate is unknown.
- Ocean (1800 EIC ship), launched in 1800 at London, participated in the Battle of Pulo Aura and made four voyages for the company; she foundered in 1811 while on her fifth voyage.
- Ocean (1802 ship), of 567 tons, was launched in 1802 at Quebec. She made five trips for the EIC between 1804 and 1814. Her owners sold her and from 1815 she began sailing between London and India under an EIC license. She was last listed in 1825.

== See also ==
- HMS Ocean
- Ocean (ship)
