= Odostomia trimariana =

Scientific classification
- Kingdom: Animalia
- Phylum: Mollusca
- Class: Gastropoda
- Family: Pyramidellidae
- Genus: Odostomia
- Species: O. trimariana

Binomial name
- Odostomia trimariana Pilsbry & Lowe, 1932

Synonyms
- Chrysallida trimariana Pilsbry & Lowe, 1932

Species of gastropod

Odostomia trimariana is a species of sea snail, a marine gastropod mollusc in the family Pyramidellidae, the pyrams and their allies.

== Distribution ==
This species occurs in the Pacific Ocean off the Tres Marias Islands, Mexico.
