= SS Oceana =

SS Oceana is the name of the following ships:

- SS Oceana (1887), sunk in a collision with Pisagua on 16 March 1912
- SS Oceana (1922), ex-USS Kermanshah, later renamed Nymphe and Kalliopi, sunk by U-402 on 7 February 1943

== See also ==
- Oceana (disambiguation)
