= HMS Admiral Rainier (1800) =

Brig of the Royal Navy

History

Great Britain
- Name: HMS Admiral Rainier
- Namesake: Admiral Peter Rainier
- Launched: c.1800
- Acquired: by capture, 23 August 1800
- Fate: Sold, September 1803

Batavian Republic
- Name: Admiraal Rainier
- Acquired: 1804
- Fate: Crew mutinied, April 1806

United Kingdom
- Name: Admiral Rainier
- Acquired: By seizure 1806
- Fate: Unknown

General characteristics
- Type: Brig
- Tons burthen: 150, (Note: Winfield expresses skepticism that the brig's burthen was 150 tons, deeming it too low for a vessel of 16 guns.) or 250 (bm)
- Complement: 97 (Dutch)
- Armament: Dutch service: 16 × 6-pounder & 4-pounder guns; British service: 14 × 6-pounder & 4-pounder guns

HMS Admiral Rainier was a Dutch 16-gun brig that the British captured on 23 August 1800 at Kuyper's Island, Java. (Note: Also referred to as Cooper's Island. This is one of a group of four islands that are themselves part of the 105 islands and over 200 islets that make up the Thousand Islands (Kepulauan Seribu). Kuyper's Island's name became Cipir Island (Pulau Cipir) and recently, Kahyangan Island (Pulau Kahyangan). It is a companion to Onrust Island (Palau Onrust or Palau Damar Besar), which was the site of a major shipyard and fort that had belonged to the by then defunct Dutch East India Company. At one point a narrow bridge linked the two islands.) They took her into service and named her after Admiral Peter Rainier, the leader of the British expedition. After the British sold her in 1803 apparently the French captured her in 1804 and sold her to the Dutch colonial government in Batavia for anti-piracy patrol. Her Javanese crew mutinied in 1806 and eventually sailed to Penang where vessels of the British East India Company (EIC) seized the vessel. She returned to British service, only to be captured and recaptured by vessels of the EIC. Her ultimate fate is unknown.

== Capture and British service ==
On 23 August 1800 Sybille, Daedalus, Centurion, and Braave entered Batavia Roads and captured five Dutch armed vessels in all and destroyed 22 other vessels. (Note: Some accounts place the captures at Onrust Island.) One of the vessels they captured was a newly built Dutch brig. (Note: Milo (June 1941) reports that the British captured the newly constructed brig Ajax. This would then probably be the vessel that became the Admiral Rainier.)

Captain Henry Lidgbird Ball of Daedalus ordered her manned, armed, and equipped. Admiral Rainier was commissioned under Lieutenant William Hugh Dobbie of Centurion. She was armed with 14 guns, a mix of 6-pounders and 4-pounders.

The British employed her in the blockade of Batavia. On 28 October Admiral Rainier went up the Carawang river with seven armed boats of the squadron to destroy a depot of grain. She accomplished the task after destroying five proas protecting the place. The British carried off three gunboats, together with the commandant's accommodation boat and three large proas laden with coffee. British losses were two killed and six wounded.

In 1802 Wellesley, the Governor-General of India, recalled the squadron. The vessels were needed in India for the Second Anglo-Maratha War (1803–1805). At the recall, Lieutenant Dobbie returned to Centurion; By 26 February 1803 Dobbie was acting commander of the EIC's brig Ternate and about to attack pirates at "Baite Island" off the coast of Gujarat. Admiral Rainier was sold in September 1803.

== Franco-Dutch service ==
The French squadron operating in the Indian Ocean under the command of Rear Admiral Linois, captured two brigs in February 1804 and sent them in to Batavia: a 16-gun brig called Admiral Rainier (1 February), and the Henrietta of 12 guns and fourteen 24-pounder carronades (12 February ). The two prizes arrived at Batavia where Linois was in a hurry to sell them. He therefore accepted a price from the "shabendar" of 133,000 piastres for both vessels and their cargoes. Admiral Rainier was taken into local colonial service as Admiraal Rainier under Captain-lieutenant Etienne Couderc. (Note: Roche (2005) has no mention of any such vessel in French service but that is not surprising as she was probably never in service before she was sold locally.)

The Dutch immediately put Admiraal Rainier to use patrolling off Batavia. Towards the end of May, under 1st Lieut. H.D. Andreae, she patrolled the Karimunjawa islands to suppress piracy. Her crew consisted of 24 European sailors, 15 marines and 58 Javanese.

In January 1805 she was decommissioned due to a shortage of seamen. Between 20 and 28 October 1805 she sailed from Semarang to Batavia under command of lieutenant Louis Quarles van Ufford. On this short voyage she had a crew of 40 Europeans and 25 Javanese recruits. In April 1806 she departed to patrol off the north coast of Java. Her commanding officer was Captain-lieutenant Christiaan Monkenberg. On board were 12 Europeans and 36 Javanese. During the night of 28–29 April the Javanese mutinied and murdered the Europeans, throwing their bodies overboard. A native quartermaster then took command and sailed Admiraal Rainier first to Borneo and then to the Riau Archipelago, now part of the Indonesia province of Riau Islands. Unable to join up with any pirates, and running out of stores, the brig sailed to Penang. Apparently, there the British seized her.

Lloyd's List reported that the Indiaman Dover Castle had retaken Admiral Rainer, country-ship, at 3°N 39°E, on 30 December 1806. According to the account, Admiral Rainer had been captured by a corvette.

The officers and men of the EIC's ships Lord Keith and Dover Castle received salvage money in October 1810 for the recapture of Admiral Rainier on 31 December 1806, as did the crew of Ocean.

A vessel named Admiral Rainier, of 250 tons (bm), was still registered at Calcutta in 1809.
