= Oceanus (disambiguation) =

Oceanus is the personification of the world-ocean in Greek myth.

Oceanus may also refer to:

== People ==
- Oceanus Hopkins (1620 – c. 1627), the only child born on the Mayflower during its historic voyage which brought the Pilgrims to America

== Ships ==
- MTS Oceanos, a cruise ship which sank off South Africa's eastern coast on 4 August 1991
- RV Oceanus, a research vessel operated by the Woods Hole Oceanographic Institution
- USS Oceanus (ARB-2), a battle damage repair ship built for the United States Navy during World War II

== Spacecraft ==
- Oceanus (Titan orbiter), a proposed orbiter mission to Saturn's moon Titan
- Oceanus (Uranus orbiter), a proposed orbiter named as an acronym for "Origins and Composition of the Exoplanet Analog Uranus System"

== Geography ==
- Ocean in Latin, sometimes found on English maps
- Oceanus Procellarum, a vast lunar mare on the western edge of the near side of Earth's Moon
- Oceanus Borealis, a hypothesised ancient Martian ocean about the north pole of Mars

== Films ==
- Oceanus: Act One, a 2015 adventure, science fiction short film directed by Jeffrey Morris
- Oceanus: Odyssey One, a 2019 adventure, science fiction film directed by Jeffrey Morris

== See also ==
- World ocean
- Ocean (disambiguation)
- Oceanic (disambiguation)
- Oceania (disambiguation)
