= Islas Marías =

Small archipelago on the Mexican west coast

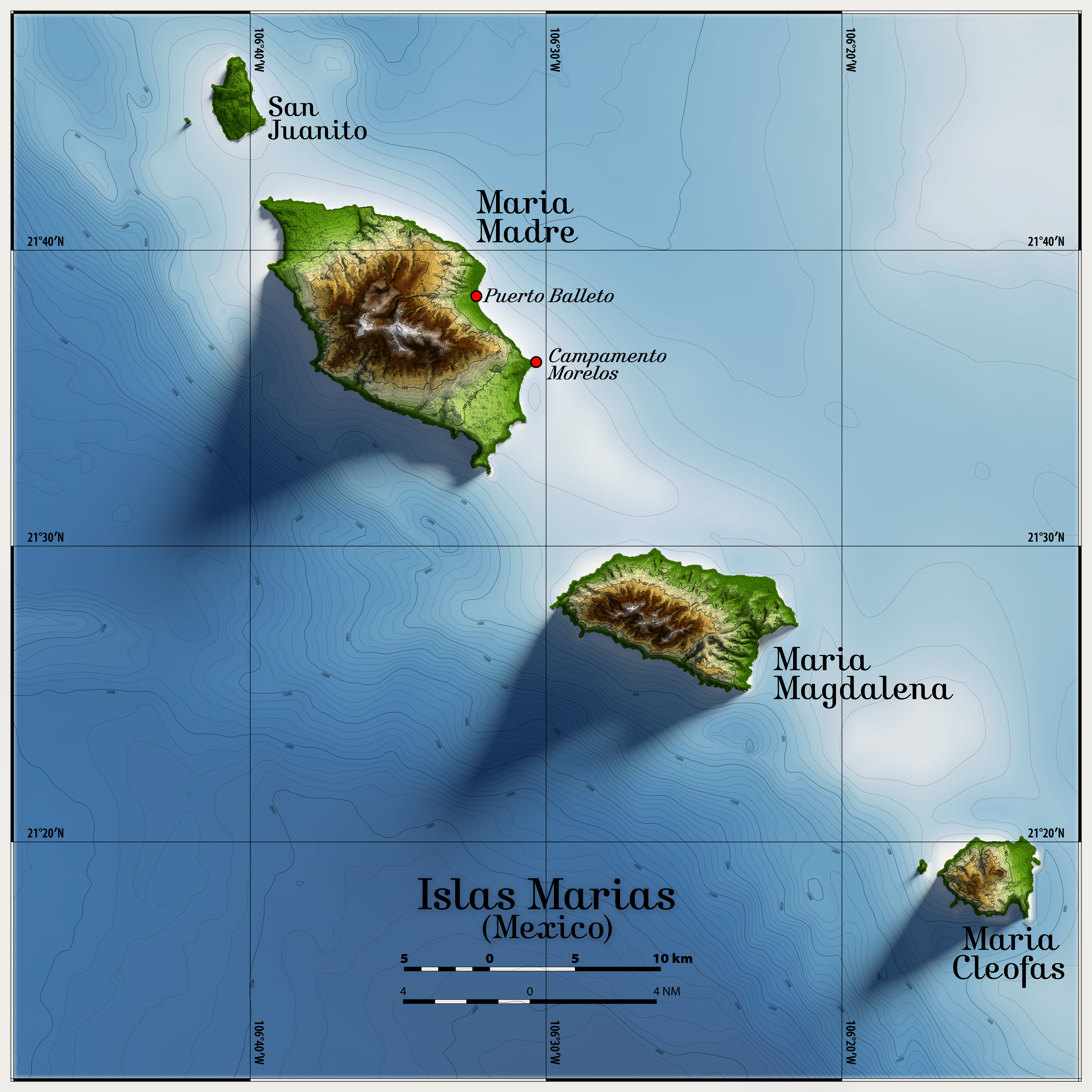

- Location in Mexico

Geography
- Location: Pacific Ocean
- Coordinates: 21°31′N 106°29′W
- Archipelago: Islas Marías
- Total islands: 9
- Major islands: María Madre, María Magdalena, María Cleofas and San Juanito
- Area: 244.970 km^{2} (94.583 sq mi)
- Highest elevation: 616 m (2021 ft)
- Highest point: Punta Rocallosa

Administration
- Mexico
- State: Nayarit
- Municipality: San Blas, Nayarit
- Largest settlement: Puerto Balleto (pop. 602)

Demographics
- Population: 1,116 (2005)
- Pop. density: 7.68/km^{2} (19.89/sq mi)

The Islas Marías ("Mary Islands") make up an archipelago in Mexico, consisting of four principal islands and five smaller islands/large offshore rocks. They are located in the Pacific Ocean, some 100 km (62 mi) off the coast of the state of Nayarit and about 370 km (230 mi) southeast of the tip of Baja California. They are part of the municipality (municipio) of San Blas, Nayarit. The islands were used as a penal colony until February 18, 2019, when President Andrés Manuel López Obrador ordered the closure of its operation as Islas Marías Federal Prison.

The first European to encounter the islands was Diego Hurtado de Mendoza, a cousin of Hernán Cortés in 1532, who gave them the name Islas Magdalenas. He found no evidence of prior habitation by the Native Americans. In 2010 the archipelago was designated the Islas Marías Biosphere Reserve by UNESCO.

== Geography ==
The islands have an aggregate area of 244.97 km^{2} (94.58 sq mi) and a population of 1,116 on Isla María Madre as of the census of 2005 along with around 8,000 prisoners. The other islands are uninhabited. The main settlement is Puerto Balleto, with a population of 602.

Isla María Madre is the largest of the islands, with an area of 145.28 km^{2} (56.09 sq mi). It houses the Islas Marías Federal Prison, which was established there in 1905. The next two largest islands are Isla María Magdalena (70.44 km^{2} [27.20 sq mi]) and, further south, Isla María Cleofas (19.82 km [12.32 mi]). They were named after three women called Mary in the Biblical New Testament: respectively, Mary, the mother of Jesus, Mary Magdalene, and Mary, the wife of Cleopas, and are referred to as the Tres Marías. A smaller island, San Juanito, with an area of 9.1 km^{2} (3.5 sq mi) lies off the north coast of Isla María Madre.

The islands are listed from north to south in the following table:

Island or Rock	Area km^{2}	Height m	Location
San Juanito	9.105	.	21°44′48″N 106°40′41″W
Piedra El Morro	0.060	.	21°44′17″N 106°42′11″W
María Madre	145.282	616	21°36′57″N 106°34′42″W
Isla Don Boni	0.025	.	21°32′30″N 106°32′0″W
María Magdalena	70.440	457	21°27′44″N 106°25′48″W
María Cleofas	19.818	402	21°18′44″N 106°14′51″W
Piedra Blanca	0.172	.	21°19′1″N 106°17′9″W
Roca Blanca	0.034	.	21°17′44″N 106°16′7″W
unnamed rock	0.034	.	21°17′52″N 106°16′35″W
Islas Marías	244.970	616	21°32′N 106°28′W

== Geology ==
Research supports the hypothesis that the Islas Marías are fragments of continental crust left over from the separation of the Baja California Peninsula from the mainland of Mexico. Rocks found on the islands correspond with rocks found around Cabo San Lucas, as well as Puerto Vallarta.

The Tres Marías Islands are a linear chain of continental shelf islands located 80–110 km from the nearest mainland, in a shallow sea. The four islands, Isla San Juanito, Isla María Madre, Isla María Magdalena and Isla María Cleofas, vary in elevation, with Isla María Madre being the largest (145 km^{2}, 620 m). Isla Isabel, a volcanic island (2 km^{2}, 190 m), may facilitate the movement of people between some of these islands and the mainland, although it is closer to the mainland.

Historically, this region was connected to the southern tip of the Baja California peninsula and the Nayarit coast during the Miocene, and remained connected to the Nayarit mainland until three million years ago in the Late Pliocene. The islands, submerged until the Late Pliocene, were formed well before the Late Pleistocene, as evidenced by Late Pleistocene terrace deposits in the lower areas of Isla María Madre and Isla María Cleofas. Significant uplift, amounting to hundreds of metres, facilitated this formation.

Throughout the Pleistocene, sea levels fluctuated cyclically, reaching 120 m below present levels during glacial maxima. These variations, due to tectonic rifting, uplift, and sea level fluctuations, had a major impact on the population dynamics of the islands' biota.

Although continental in character, the islands are occasionally grouped with oceanic islands in the eastern Pacific like the Galápagos Islands and the Revillagigedo Islands, due to their relatively isolated geography and endemism.

== Fauna ==
The main vegetation of Tres Marías is a seasonally dry tropical forest of medium height, very similar to the undisturbed vegetation on the adjacent mainland. Rainfall patterns are similar to those of the mainland, while mean annual temperature and total annual rainfall are slightly and markedly lower respectively.

Animal species endemic to the Islas Marías include the Tres Marías amazon, Tres Marías hummingbird and Tres Marías island mouse, in addition to the Tres Marías raccoon, a subspecies of the common raccoon.

== Populated places ==
All populated places of the Islas Marías are on Isla María Madre. They are listed from north to south in the following table:

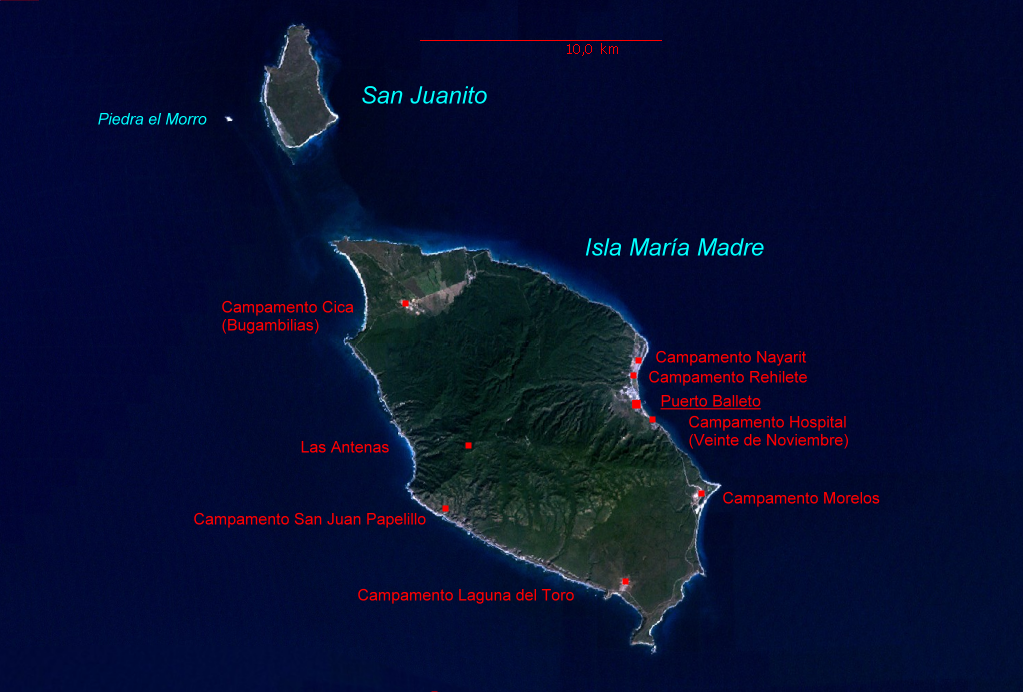
Populated Place	Population (Census 2005)	Location
Punta el Morro	-	21°41′45″N 106°39′19″W
Venustiano Carranza (Serradero, Aserradero)	-	21°40′45″N 106°36′45″W
Campamento Cica (Bugambilias)	190	21°40′15″N 106°37′45″W
Campamento Nayarit	51	21°39′0″N 106°32′20″W
Campamento Rehilete	71	21°38′44″N 106°32′29″W
Puerto Balleto (Isla María Madre)	602	21°37′58″N 106°32′21″W
Zacatal	-	21°37′44″N 106°35′26″W
Camarón	-	21°37′26″N 106°37′55″W
Campamento Hospital (Veinte de Noviembre)	53	21°37′34″N 106°31′55″W
Las Antenas	2	21°37′15″N 106°36′18″W
Campamento Morelos (José María Morelos)	98	21°36′4″N 106°30′47″W
Campamento San Juan Papelillo	18	21°35′30″N 106°36′26″W
Borbollón (Borbollones)	-	21°34′15″N 106°31′0″W
Campamento Laguna del Toro	31	21°34′8″N 106°32′37″W
Punta Halcones	-	21°32′45″N 106°32′30″W
Isla María Madre	1,116	21°36′57″N 106°34′42″W

Each populated center features a different economic activity. The primary population center is Puerto Balleto, the location of the administrative offices and the primary centers of commerce and recreation. It is subdivided into four jefaturas:

1. Balleto, 21°38′2″N 106°32′21″W
2. Bellavista, 21°38′19″N 106°32′30″W
3. Unit Habitacional Miguel Hidalgo (UHMH), 21°38′13″N 106°32′26″W
4. Primero de Mayo, 21°38′20″N 106°32′23″W

== Weather ==
The mean temperature of island remain between 84 and 89 degrees Fahrenheit throughout the year. In April, May, and June sometimes temperatures cross the limit of thirty-five degrees Celsius. In December, January, and February the temperatures remain under twenty-five degrees. Sometimes the temperature may drop under twenty degrees Celsius. Most of the time weather remains dry but July, August, and September may receive rain up to 10mm. The average wind speed is between twelve and nineteen km/hour. The below chart shows the maximum and minimum temperature.

Climate data for Puerto Balleto (Isla María Madre)
Month	Jan	Feb	Mar	Apr	May	Jun	Jul	Aug	Sep	Oct	Nov	Dec	Year
Mean daily maximum °C (°F)	29 (84)	29 (84)	31 (88)	32 (90)	34 (93)	34 (93)	32 (90)	31 (88)	31 (88)	31 (88)	31 (88)	29 (84)	31 (88)
Mean daily minimum °C (°F)	13 (55)	14 (57)	15 (59)	17 (63)	19 (66)	22 (72)	24 (75)	24 (75)	24 (75)	22 (72)	18 (64)	15 (59)	19 (66)

== Hurricane Willa ==
Hurricane Willa passed through the Islas Marías on October 23, 2018. The National Hurricane Center reported at 9 AM MDT "Aircraft finds the core of Willa passing over Las Islas Marías Mexico". A subsequent report from the NHC stated that "Life-threatening storm surge is occurring along the coasts of the Isla Marías". The NHC also reported that "An automated observing site on Las Islas Marías recently reported a sustained wind of 88 mph (142 km/h) with a gust to 112 mph (180 km/h)".

== Lighthouse ==
There is a lighthouse located on a ridge above Puerto Balleto on Isla María Madre. The height of tower is 62 metres (200 ft). The lighthouse main gallery is painted white while the tower of the lighthouse is colored in red and white. The lighthouse is made of concrete and a large single story keeper house is also constructed with the lighthouse. The light house shines two white flashes every 10 seconds. The diameter of the light house is seven meters.

== Transportation ==
There is small airfield adjacent to Puerto Balleto on Isla María Madre. The Mexican government opened the Islands to tourism for the first time ever in summer of 2024. The airfield is serviced by a single flight operated by the regional tourism board with weekly flights between Tepic, Nayarit and the islands that started in October 2024. The governments hope is to transform the islands into a new bio-tourism destination.

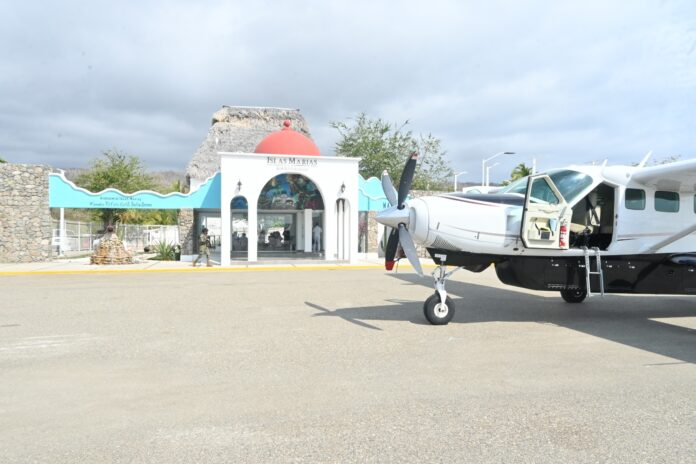
Isla Marías Airport in Nayarit, Mexico

== Prison of Isla Maria ==
The Islas Marías Federal Prison was constructed in 1905, when Porfirio Díaz decreed that these islands would become a penal colony by adding them to the Penal Code and establishing the penalty of expulsion as the legal justification for its operation. One of its more notable prisoners was the Mexican progressive writer Jose Revueltas who wrote his first book Los Muros de Agua (The Walls of Water) while incarcerated there.

The idea of a penal colony in the Marías Islands was not new, as it had been considered by previous governments, such as those of Benito Juárez and Maximilian of Habsburg. However, it was under Porfirio Díaz that the proposal came to fruition, as part of his efforts to implement a penal reform that would guarantee social control, the availability of labour and the protection of foreign investment.

The process of establishing the penal colony came to fruition with the purchase of the archipelago by the government in 1902. Subsequently, in 1905, the Islas Marías were officially declared a penal colony and the penalty of descent was introduced as a form of punishment. The addition to the Penal Code in 1908 detailed aspects of this punishment, establishing two periods and conditions for its application.

The director of the penal colony, Arturo G. Cubillas, played a decisive role in the adaptation and application of the penalty of descent. An administrative structure was set up, which included the General Directorate, Deputy Directorate, Administration, General Services and Security. Two camps were also set up, Balleto and Salinas, where various activities were carried out.

The penitentiary regime at Islas Marías was characterised by a discipline that sought to normalise the behaviour of the inmates. For those who showed good behaviour, there were measures such as pre-release, and those who were released were allowed to stay in the colony. The legal justification for the sentence of descent was based on a progressive approach, similar to that of the Spanish penal system. The Islas Marías penal colony operated until 2010 and was one of the last island penal colonies in Latin America.

In addition to prisoners, on Maria Madre island there were employees of diverse institutions of the federal government, such as the Secretariat of Public Education, the Secretariat of the Environment, the Secretariat of Communications and Transport, post office, and the Secretariat of the Navy. Another group of settlers is made up of religious ministers and acolytes of the Catholic Church, nuns of the Order of Social Service, and invited teachers, technicians and their relatives.

The colony is governed by a state official who is both the governor of the islands and chief judge. The military command is independent and is exercised by an officer of the Mexican Navy.

President of Mexico Andrés Manuel López Obrador announced on February 18, 2019, that his administration would close the Islas Marías Federal Prison, replacing it with a new cultural center that will be named for José Revueltas.

== See also ==
- Tres Marías cottontail
