= Puerto Balleto =

- town
- Interactive map of Puerto Balleto
- Location (in red)
- Coordinates: 21°38′02″N 106°32′21″W
- Country: Mexico
- State: Nayarit
- Municipality: San Blas

Population
  - Total: 602
- Time zone: UTC−7 (MST)
  - Summer (DST): UTC−6 (MDT)

Puerto Balleto is a town in the municipality of San Blas, Nayarit, located in Isla de María Madre, the largest of Islas Marías archipelago.

Puerto Balleto is also the main and largest settlement of the Islas Marías Federal Prison. Its population reaches up to 602 inhabitants and includes administrative offices and primary centers of commerce and recreation.

The penal colony is governed by a state official who is both the governor of the islands and the chief judge. The military command is independent of the government and is exercised by an officer of the Mexican Navy.

In 2023, Puerto Balleto was designated a Pueblo Mágico by the Mexican government, recognizing its cultural and historical importance.
