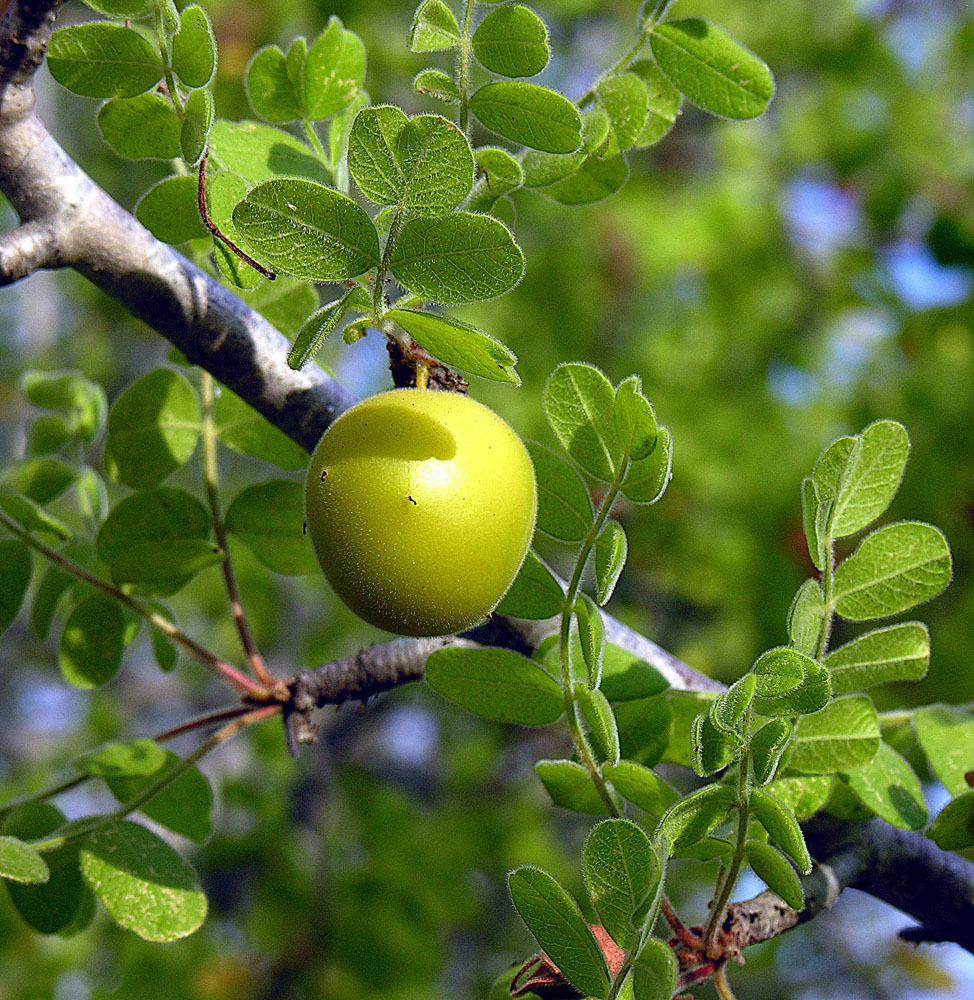
- The drupe

Scientific classification
- Kingdom: Plantae
- Clade: Tracheophytes
- Clade: Angiosperms
- Clade: Eudicots
- Clade: Rosids
- Order: Sapindales
- Family: Anacardiaceae
- Genus: Cyrtocarpa
- Species: C. edulis

Binomial name
- Cyrtocarpa edulis (T. S. Brandegee) Standley, 1923

Synonyms
- Tapirira edulis T. S. Brandegee

= Cyrtocarpa edulis =

Cimarrón plum

Species of flowering plant

Cyrtocarpa edulis is a species of perennial sarcocaulescent tree commonly known as the Cimarrón plum or Cape wild-plum. It is in the genus Cyrtocarpa, and is endemic to Baja California Sur. This plant is characterized by fleshy stems, twisted branches and an edible drupe.

== Description ==
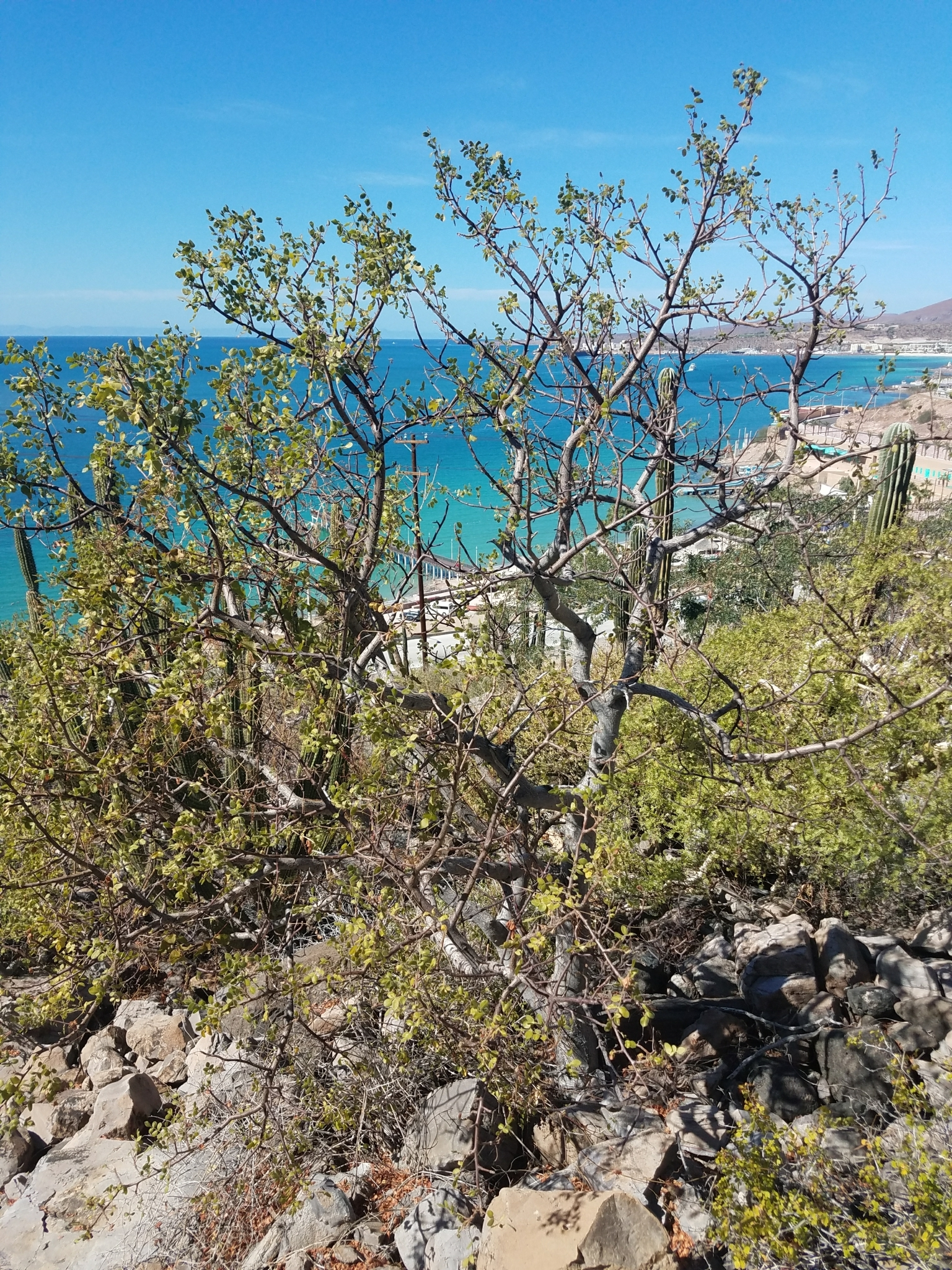
Growing in habitat.

These spreading trees or shrubs may grow 5 to 8 meters in height with smooth, light-grey bark and have a thick, succulent trunk that can reach 2/3 m in diameter. Plants on sand dunes may grow in a prostrate habit. The leaves are pinnately compound, and 4 to 10 cm long, composed of 7 to 11 ovate or elliptic shaped leaflets. The dioecious flowers are white and tinged with green, the female flowers with 5 petals 1.5 to 3 mm long. The fruit is an oblong to ovoid shaped drupe, 1.5 to 2 cm long, and green to yellow when ripe.

== Taxonomy ==
Two varieties of this species are recognized:

- Cyrtocarpa edulis var. edulis — Commonly known as the Cape wild-plum. The autonymous variety, with dense pubescence (hairs; trichomes) on the leaves, flowers, and fruits.
- Cytrocarpa edulis var. glabra León de la Luz & Pérez Navarro — Commonly known as the Cape smooth wild-plum. This variety is characterized by a lack of trichomes (glabrous condition) on the leaves, flowers, and fruits. Both varieties are sympatric with each other, but var. glabra has a more restricted range, mostly along the Pacific coast.

== Distribution and habitat ==
This species most commonly occurs in the Cape Region of Baja California Sur, but may be found in the mountain ranges from the southern Sierra de la Giganta to Los Cabos. It also occurs on the adjacent islands of San Jose, Espiritu Santo, and Cerralvo in the southern Gulf of California. This plant is commonly found on sandy plains and slopes, and often in arid, tropical forests or in areas of deep soil in the mountains. It is intolerant of shade in the foothills, and is sensitive to low winter temperature in the highlands.

== Uses ==
This species has been introduced into horticultural circles via the Huntington Botanical Gardens International Succulent Introductions program in 2021. It can be propagated from both seed or cuttings, as the branches may be sufficiently succulent to root.

The edible fruit is used locally. The drought-tolerant nature of this species may make it a viable fruit crop for arid land.
