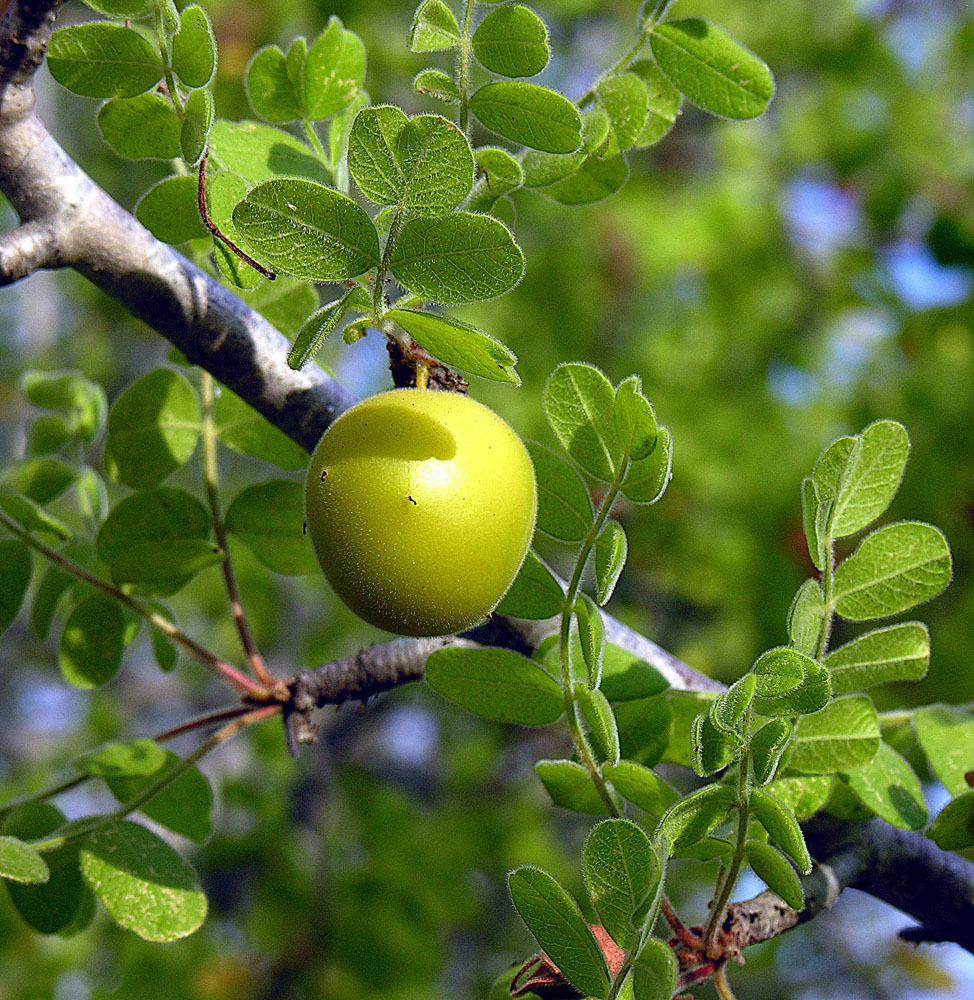
- Cyrtocarpa edulis

Scientific classification
- Kingdom: Plantae
- Clade: Tracheophytes
- Clade: Angiosperms
- Clade: Eudicots
- Clade: Rosids
- Order: Sapindales
- Family: Anacardiaceae
- Subfamily: Spondiadoideae
- Genus: Cyrtocarpa; Kunth

Type species
- Cyrtocarpa procera

Species
- See text

Synonyms
- Dasycarya Liebm.

= Cyrtocarpa =

Genus of trees

Cyrtocarpa is a genus of trees in the subfamily Spondiadoideae of the cashew and sumac family Anacardiaceae. Their habitat is dry forests to open arid areas. They grow naturally in Mexico and northern South America.

== Species ==
The Plant List and Catalogue of Life recognise 5 accepted species:

- Cyrtocarpa caatingae J.D.Mitch. & Daly
- Cyrtocarpa edulis (Brandegee) Standl.
- Cyrtocarpa kruseana R.M.Fonseca
- Cyrtocarpa procera Kunth
- Cyrtocarpa velutinifolia (R.S.Cowan) J.D.Mitch. & Daly
