= Lord Keith (1804 ship) =

British merchant ship

History

United Kingdom
- Name: Lord Keith
- Namesake: Baron Keith
- Owner: EIC voyages 1-2:Peter Everett Mestaer; EIC voyages 3-8: Robert Morris
- Operator: British East India Company
- Builder: Peter Everitt Mestaer, King and Queen Dock, Rotherhithe
- Launched: 12 May 1804
- Fate: Broken up c. 1820

General characteristics
- Type: East Indiaman
- Tons burthen: 599, or 633, r 63369/94, or 861 (bm)
- Length: 132 ft 2 in (40.3 m) (overall); 107 ft 4 in (32.7 m) (keel)
- Beam: 32 ft 5 in (9.9 m)
- Depth of hold: 13 ft 0 in (4.0 m)
- Sail plan: Full-rigged ship
- Complement: 1804:60; 1808:60; 1812:50
- Armament: 1804:16 × 6-pounder guns; 1808:18 × 12-pounder guns; 1812:18 × 12-pounder guns
- Notes: Three decks

Lord Keith was launched in 1804 by and for Peter Everitt Mestaer. He chartered her to the East India Company (EIC) for six voyages, and she then went on to make another two voyages for the EIC. On her second voyage, and unusually for an East Indiaman, she participated in the proceeds for the recapture of a former British Royal Navy brig and possibly in a skirmish with a French ship. On her third voyage she participated in a notable action. She was broken up c.1820.

== Career ==
On 14 March 1804, the EIC chartered Lord Keith for six voyages at a rate of £13 14s/ton (bm) for peace freight, and £9 19s/ton (bm) for contingencies, based on a tonnage of 600 tons (bm).

=== EIC voyage #1 (1804-1805) ===
Captain Patrick Ramage acquired a letter of marque on 25 June 1804. He sailed from Portsmouth on 4 September, bound for Madras and Bengal. Lord Keith was at Madeira on 27 September, and reached Madras on 17 February 1805. She arrived at Diamond Harbour on 19 March. Homeward bound, she was at Saugor on 3 June, reached St Helena on 22 October, and arrived at The Downs on 23 December.

=== EIC voyage #2 (1806-1807) ===
Captain Ramage sailed from Portsmouth on 10 June 1806, bound for St Helena and Bengal. Lord Keith reached St Helena on 22 August.

Lloyd's List reported that the Indiaman Dover Castle had retaken Admiral Rainier, country-ship, at 3°N 89°E, on 30 December 1806. According to the account, Admiral Rainer had been captured by a corvette. The officers and men of the Indiamen Lord Keith and Dover Castle received salvage money in October 1810 for the recapture of Admiral Rainier on 31 December 1806, as did Ocean.

Lord Keith arrived at Diamond Harbour on 21 January 1807. She was at Saugor on 22 February and arrived at Bencoolen on 10 April. Ramage died at Fort Marlborough, i.e., Bencoolen. Lord Keith's First Officer was John Mayne. Lord Keith reached St Helena on 9 August, and arrived at The Downs on 10 November. The day before Lord Keith arrived at The Downs, she apparently skirmished with a French ship.

=== EIC voyage #3 (1808-1810) ===
Captain Peter Campbell acquired a letter of marque on 1 February 1808. He sailed from Portsmouth on 15 April 1808, bound for St Helena and Bengal. Lord Keith was at St Helena on 4 July, the Cape of Good Hope on 15 September, and Trincomalee on 10 December. She arrived at Calcutta on 22 January 1809. Homeward bound, she was at Saugor on 20 March.

On 2 May 1809 she departed from the Sandheads with a convoy of four other Indiamen and several smaller vessels, all under the escort of HMS Victor. On 24 May a storm split the convoy and Victor and the small ships separately lost touch with the Indiamen. Monarch had a leak that had worsened. She received permission from Captain John Dale of Streatham, the senior EIC captain of the five vessels and so commodore, to sail to Penang. Hawes requested that another of the Indiamen accompany him in case Monarch foundered. Dale detailed Earl Spencer to go with Monarch. The three remaining Indiamen, Streatham, Europe, and Lord Keith continued on their way while hoping to meet up with Victor. They were unsuccessful.

The French frigate Caroline captured Streatham and Europe in the action of 31 May 1809. Lord Keith also exchanged broadsides with Caroline and was damaged; however, she escaped and sailed to Penang to repair.

Lord Keith arrived at Penang on 10 June, a few days after Monarch and Lord Spencer. Repairs completed, all three then sailed together and reached St Helena on 14 November; they arrived at The Downs on 19 or 20 January 1810.

=== EIC voyage #4 (1810-1811) ===
Captain Campbell sailed from Portsmouth on 9 June 1810, bound for Bengal. Lord Keith reached Madeira on 26 June, and arrived at Diamond Harbour on 12 December and Calcutta on 22 December. Homeward bound, she was at Saugor on 24 February 1811, reached St Helena on 18 June, and arrived at The Downs on 30 August.

=== EIC voyage #5 (1812-1813) ===
Captain John Freeman acquired a letter of marque on 15 February 1812. He sailed from Portsmouth on 8 April, bound for Madras and Bengal. Lord Keith reached Madeira on 24 April and Madras on 17 September. She arrived at Calcutta on 4 November. Homeward bound, she was at Saugor on 13 January 1813 and Point de Galle on 16 March. She reached St Helena on 10 June and arrived at The Downs on 10 August.

=== EIC voyage #6 (1814-1815) ===
Captain Peter Campbell sailed from Portsmouth on 9 April 1814, bound for Madras and Bengal. She was part of a fleet under convoy of HMS Grampus. Lord Keith arrived at Madeira on 26 April, having parted from the Fleet the day before. She reached Madras on 18 September. She arrived at Diamond Harbour on 21 October. Homeward bound, she was at Saugor on 30 November, and Madras again on 19 December. Next she was at Point de Galle on 9 January 1815, reached the Cape on 27 March and St Helena on 24 April, and arrived at The Downs on 23 June.

=== EIC voyage #7 (1816-1817) ===
Captain Campbell sailed from The Downs on 30 March 1816, bound for Madras and Bengal. Lord Keith was at Madeira on 9 April and reached Madras on 27 July. She arrived at Diamond Harbour on 10 September. Homeward bound, she was at the New Anchorage on 23 November. She was at Vizagapatam on 30 December and Madras again on 8 January 1817. She reached the Cape on 28 March and St Helena on 16 April. She then visited Ascension Island on 26 April, before arriving at The Downs on 21 June.

=== EIC voyage #8 (1818-1819) ===
(8) 1817/8 Bengal and Bencoolen. Captain John Freeman sailed from Portsmouth on 15 May 1818, bound for Bengal and Bencoolen. Lord Keith reached Madras on 10 September and arrived at Kidderpore on 4 October. Homeward bound, she was at Saugor on 9 December and Vizagapatam on 28 December. She was again at Madras on 10 January 1819, reached St Helena on 15 April, and arrived at The Downs on 27 June. She apparently did not visit Bencoolen on this voyage.

== Later career and fate ==
Lord Keith was sold in 1819 as a hulk. However, she appears in the 1820 volume of Lloyd's Register with P. Campbell, master, R. Morris, owner, and trade London–Bengal. The entry may represent stale information or a plan that did not eventuate. She does not appear on the lists of vessels that sailed to India in 1820 or 1821 under license from the EIC. She is also not listed in the 1822 Lloyd's Register.
