= Dover Castle (1798 EIC ship) =

History

British East India Company
- Name: Dover Castle
- Namesake: Dover Castle
- Owner: 1798:John Atkins; 1814:Atkins & Co.
- Builder: Wells, Deptford
- Launched: 4 January 1798
- Fate: Last listed 1821; hulked, then broken up in 1826

General characteristics
- Type: East Indiaman
- Tons burthen: 826, or 82629/94, or 847, or 857 (bm)
- Length: 146 ft 5 1/2 in (44.6 m) (overall); 118 ft 11 in (36.2 m) (keel)
- Beam: 36 ft 1 1/2 in (11.0 m)
- Depth of hold: 14 ft 10 in (4.5 m)
- Sail plan: Full-rigged ship
- Complement: 1798:90; 1803:100; 1804:100; 1814:70
- Armament: 1798:26 × 12&18-pounder cannons swivel guns; 1803:26 × 6&12-pounder guns; 1804:32 × 18&12-pounder cannons; 1814:22 × 12-pounder guns + 4 × 42-pounder carronades
- Notes: Three decks

Dover Castle was launched in 1798 as an East Indiaman for the British East India Company (EIC). She made six voyages for the EIC. During the second she transported EIC troops to Macao to augment the Portuguese forces there, but the authorities there refused them permission to land. In 1814 Dover Castle was sold and she served for a half-dozen years as a London-based transport. She was hulked c.1820 and finally broken up in 1826.

== Career ==
=== EIC voyage #1 (1798-1799) ===
Captain Peter Sampson acquired a letter of marque on 15 February 1798. He sailed from Portsmouth on 24 March, bound for Madras. Dover Castle reached the Cape of Good Hope on 5 June and arrived at Madras on 21 August.Homeward bound, she was at the Cape on 3 January 1799 and reached St Helena on 8 February. She left St Helena on 9 May and arrived at The Downs on 13 July.

=== EIC voyage #2 (1801-1803) ===
Captain Sampson sailed from Portsmouth on 31 March 1801, bound for Madras and Bengal. She reached Madras on 20 July and arrived at Diamond Harbour on 20 August.

Macao Expedition: During the French revolutionary and Napoleonic Wars the British Government and the EIC feared that the French would capture one or more of Portugal's colonies of Goa, Damam, Diu, or Macao and use it as a base for operations against Britain's possessions. Because Portugal was a British ally the British could not invade the colonies, it could only offer assistance in the form of extra troops. In 1801 the Admiralty asked Admiral Peter Rainier, the commander-in-chief of Royal Navy operations on the East Indies Station to assist the Portuguese at Macao.

Governor-General Warren Hastings decided to charter two East Indiamen, Dover Castle and Asia, to carry troops to Macao and offer the troops to the Portuguese as an augmentation of the garrison. A third vessel, the transport Rainier, would accompany the expedition. (Note: It is not clear which vessel Rainier was. She may have been a 500-ton (bm) ship launched at Demaun (Daman) in 1801, taken into Government service as a transport, and lost at Trincomalee in 1803.)

The troops consisted of a company of the 78th Regiment of Foot, 500 men of the Bengal Marine Battalion, a company of European artillery, and a number of field and carriage guns, all under the command of Lieutenant-Colonel Hamilton. HMS Romney was to provide an escort as far as the straits of Macassar.

Dover Castle was at Saugor on 29 October. The expedition set out on 10 November. It stopped at Penang to exchange the Marine Battalion for soldiers there and at Malacca who would be better suited to the task at hand. Dover Castle was at Penang on 26 December. Lieutenant-Colonel Hamilton then had the expedition stop at Amboina to take on water so that there would be sufficient on hand if the troops could not land at Macao. Dover Castle was at Amboina on 5 February 1802, and the expedition sailed on 15 February; HMS Arrogant provided the escort.

The expedition arrived at Lintin Island on 18 March. The Governor of Macao refused on 24 March to give permission for the troops to land, absent orders from his superiors at Goa. Ultimately, permission was not forthcoming. Dover Castle was at "Sambroke" on 23 April, and Lintin again on 14 May. On 3 July Dover castle and Asia sailed from Macao to return to Bengal. Dover Castle arrived at Diamond Harbour on 22 October, as did Asia.

Homeward bound, Dover Castle was at Saugor on 19 December and Madras on 25 February 1803. She reached St Helena on 15 May and arrived at The Downs on 31 July. While she was on her homeward voyage, war with France resumed. Captain Sampson acquired a letter of marque on 20 June 1803, in absentia.

=== EIC voyage #3 (1804-1805) ===
Captain George Richardson acquired a letter of marque on 2 March 1804. He sailed from Portsmouth on 8 May, bound for St Helena and Bengal. Dover Castle reached St Helena on 6 August, and arrived at Diamond Harbour on 28 November. Homeward bound, she was at Saugor on 4 February 1805, reached St Helena on 2 June, and arrived at Long Reach on 13 September.

=== EIC voyage #4 (1806-1807) ===
Captain Richardson sailed from Portsmouth on 18 June 1806, bound for St Helena, Madras and Bengal. She reached St Helena on 27 August.

Lloyd's List reported that the Indiaman Dover Castle had retaken Admiral Rainier, country-ship, at 3°N 89°E, on 30 December 1806. According to the account, Admiral Rainer had been captured by a corvette. The officers and men of the Indiamen Lord Keith and Dover Castle received salvage money in October 1810 for the recapture of Admiral Rainier on 31 December 1806, as did Ocean.

Dover Castle arrived at Diamond Harbour on 22 January 1807. She visited Madras on 20 March, and was back at Diamond Harbour on 22 April, and at Calcutta on 10 May. Homeward bound, she was at Diamond Harbour on 18 June, Saugor on 9 August, and Vizagapatam on 12 September. She was again at Madras on 3 October and the Cape on 30 December. She reached St Helena on 25 January 1808, and arrived at Long Reach on 10 April.

=== EIC voyage #5 (1809-1810) ===
Captain Richardson sailed from Portsmouth on 28 April 1809, bound for Bombay. Dover Castle reached Johanna on 24 August and arrived at Bombay on 19 September. Homeward bound, she was at Point de Galle on 20 February 1810, reached St Helena on 3 May, and arrived at Long Reach on 9 July.

=== EIC voyage #6 (1811-1813) ===
Captain Richardson sailed from Torbay on 30 May 1811, bound for Ceylon, Bengal, and Madras. Dover Castle was at Madeira on 19 June and Colombo on 13 October. She arrived at Diamond Harbour on 15 December and Calcutta on 10 January 1812. She was at Diamond Harbour on 6 March and Saugor on 16 April, before returning to Calcutta on 7 June.

Dover Castle had run aground at Saugor on 25 May 1812 and had been severely damaged. She was later refloated and taken in to Calcutta for repairs.

Homeward bound, she was at Vizagapatam on 8 October, Madras on 15 October, and the Cape on 29 December. She reached St Helena on 26 January 1813, and arrived at Long Reach on 16 May.

== Later career and fate ==
In 1813 Dover Castle was sold for use as a storeship and troopship. On 20 March 1814 Captain Frederick Hubbard acquired a letter of marque.

Year	Master	Owner	Trade	Source
1815	Hubbert	Atkins	London transport	Register of Shipping (RS)
1820	Hubbert	Atkins	London transport	RS

Dover Castle was last listed in Lloyd's Register in 1820 and in the Register of Shipping in 1821. She was finally broken up in 1826 after having been hulked.
