= Oceania (disambiguation) =

Oceania is a geographic region in the lands of the central and southern Pacific Ocean, namely Melanesia, Micronesia and Polynesia (including New Zealand). Some definitions add Australia and the Malay Archipelago.

Oceania may also refer to:

== Fiction ==
- Oceania (Nineteen Eighty-Four), the main superstate in George Orwell's novel Nineteen Eighty-Four
- Oceania Cooperative Union, a supranational blocs in the Front Mission franchise
- Oceania (film), the Italian title of the 2016 film Moana

== Music ==
- Oceania (Goanna album), a 1985 album by the band Goanna
- Oceania (Oceania album), a 1999 album by the New Zealand act Oceania
- Oceania (The Smashing Pumpkins album), a 2012 album by The Smashing Pumpkins
- "Oceania", a song by Gowan from his eponymous 1982 album
- "Oceania", a song by the Pat Metheny Group from the 1996 album Quartet
- "Oceania" (song), a song by Björk, from the 2004 album Medúlla

== Ships ==
- List of ships named Oceania
- Oceania Cruises, a U.S.-based luxury cruise line

== People ==
- Oceania (footballer), Mauro Aparecido de Lucas (1936–2017), Brazilian footballer

== Other uses ==
- Oceania (board game), a board game for one or two players
- Oceania (journal), an Australian academic publication founded in 1930
- Oceanía metro station, a station on the Mexico City Metro Lines 5 and B
- Deportivo Oceanía metro station, a station on the Mexico City Metro Line B
- French Oceania (French: Océanie française), the name used for French Polynesia from 1842 to 1957
- Outlying Oceania, a grouping of territories in the Unicode Common Locale Data Repository
- Oceania (hydrozoan), a genus of hydrozoan
- Oceania Television Network, a Palauan television channel
- Oceania Broadcasting Network, a Tongan television channel

== See also ==
- Oceana (disambiguation)
- Ocean (disambiguation)
- Oceanic (disambiguation)
- Australia (disambiguation)
