= Oceana =

Oceana may refer to:

== People ==
- Oceana (singer) (born 1982), German singer
- Ocey Snead (1885–1909), American murder victim
- Oceana Wu (born 1993), Taiwanese actress
- Oceana Zarco (1911–2008), Polish cyclist

== Places ==
- Oceana County, Michigan
- Oceana, Virginia, a neighborhood of Virginia Beach
- Oceana, West Virginia
- Naval Air Station Oceana, in Virginia Beach, Virginia

== Music ==
- Oceana (band), an American post-hardcore band
- Oceana (album), an album by Derek Sherinian
- Oceàna (opera), by Antonio Smareglia
- "Oceana", a song by the 3rd and the Mortal from the album Tears Laid in Earth
- "Oceana", a song by Butcher Babies from the album Lilith
- Oceana, a musical project produced by Manny Lehman

== Other uses ==
- Oceana (plant), a genus of plants
- Oceana (conservation organization)
- Oceana (nightclub), a chain of nightclubs in the United Kingdom
- Oceana (restaurant), in New York City
- MV Oceana, a cruise ship
- SS Oceana (1887), an ocean liner
- Oceana Publications, an American legal publisher
- The Commonwealth of Oceana, a 1656 political tract by James Harington
- 224 Oceana, an asteroid in the asteroid belt

== See also ==
- Miss Oceana, a racehorse
- Ocean (disambiguation)
- Oceania (disambiguation)
