= Oceana Zarco =

First female professional cyclist in Portugal

Oceana Zarco (12 April 1911 – 11 January 2008) was the first professional female cyclist in Portugal.

Oceana Rosa de Sousa Zarco was born on 12 April 1911 in the parish of Santa Maria da Graça in Setúbal, Portugal. Her stepfather, João Duarte, owned a bicycle shop in Setúbal and encouraged her to ride, despite the fact that this was a very unusual activity for girls and women in Portugal at that time, as were most sports. By the age of 7 she was already cycling to school. At the age of 10 she joined the cycling team at the sports club of Vitória de Setúbal and, using a boy's bicycle, began to train and compete with boys.

Zarco became a professional in 1925 at the age of 14, registering with the Federação Portuguesa de Ciclismo as Number 227. She continued to use a men's bicycle, wore shorts together with a shirt in the distinctive green and white stripes of her club, and cut her hair short. In 1924 the first women's "Tour of Lisbon" cycling race was held, with just three competitors. It was won by Cesina Bermudes, who went on to become a well-known obstetrician, with the other two competitors being her sister Clara and Estela de Oliveira. Bermudes managed to retain her title in the following year, but faced strong opposition from Zarco, who went on to win in the following three years. In 1926 she also won the "Tour of Porto", on a course she did not know in a city she had not been to. She also won the “Tour of Setúbal”.

At the age of 18, in 1929, Zarco was forced to abandon cycling. It seems likely that this was for financial reasons, although one source suggests that she had to have surgery. She then studied nursing and was a nurse for 30 years. She married late in life because the right-wing Estado Novo regime did not permit nurses to marry until 1963.

Zarco died on 11 January 2008. A street has been named after her in Setúbal.
