= Islas Marías Federal Prison =

Prison in Mexico

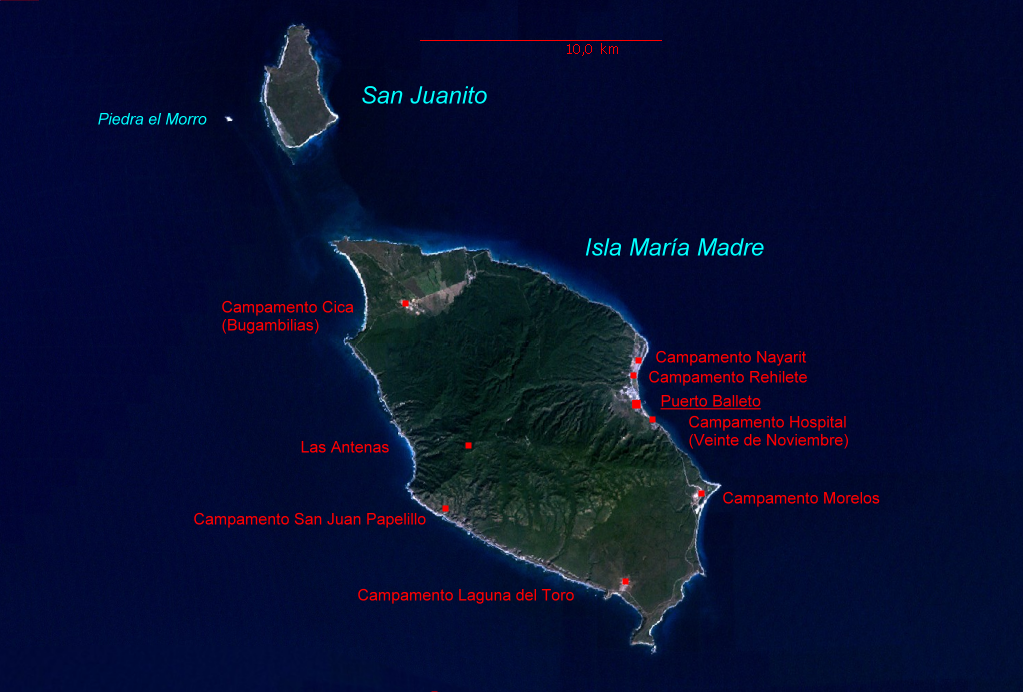
- Isla Maria Madre

- Location within Mexico
- Interactive map of Islas Marías Federal Prison
- Location: Isla María Madre; 21°34′03″N 106°32′40″W
- Opened: 1905
- Closed: 2019

The Islas Marías Federal Penal Colony was a penitentiary establishment of the Federal Government of Mexico, administered through the Federal Secretariat of Public Security. It is located on Isla María Madre, the northernmost and largest island in the Marías Islands archipelago off the Pacific coast of Mexico.

== History ==
Built in 1905, under the government of Porfirio Díaz, the prison of las Islas Marías was "the pride of the government" becoming the most modern prison model of its time, "escape proof", which operated as an alternative to house the delinquents, who due to their profile and background, could not be held in the prison of Lecumberri.

Until 1950, this prison colony was known as a feared detention center, due to violence, disease, and forced labor. It is calculated that the total number of prisoners to be housed there is above 29,000.

During the government of Ernesto Zedillo, the government decided to modernize the prison system and Islas Marias was deactivated. On 27 November 2003, it was declared a biosphere reserve but with the prison system still existing.

The prison situation in Mexico became so critical that the government announced in 2004 that they were reactivating the Islas Marias prison to transfer 2,500 prisoners from prisons all over the country.

On 18 February 2019, Mexican president, Andrés Manuel López Obrador, signed a declaration closing the federal prison on the Islas Marías, saying he wanted to promote "more schools and fewer prisons".

== Famous prisoners ==
Islas Marias Federal Prison was home to some well-known prisoners including:

- Elias Breeskin, famous Russian violinist
- Ramón Mercader, Leon Trotsky's assassin
- José Revueltas, novelist, "Los Muros de Agua"
- Concepción Acevedo "Madre Conchita", Nun

== Prison escapes ==
The prison has had at least 76 escapes in the last 25 years of which 29 took place in 1986 alone. According to newspaper reports the causes are minimum vigilance, shortage of guards and equipment. Among the most dangerous to escape were criminals sentenced for drug trafficking, 28 murderers, and kidnappers. Of the 76 escapees from the Islas Marías, only 10 have been recaptured. According to one source 95% of the escapes are due to corruption.

- On 25 October 1986, an entire family of kidnappers escaped. The Reyes Servín brothers, from Michoacán, have never been caught.
- On 16 January 2006, three drug dealers managed to escape. These were José Abraham González Salas, Fernando Méndez del Fierro and Luis Rey López Barrera. González Salas and Méndez del Fierro were sentenced in California, United States. Through the program of interchange they were transferred to the state of Michoacán. González Salas had been sentenced to 24 years for traffic of methamphetamines and heroin. Méndez del Fierro had been sentenced to 18 years for possession and distribution of cocaine. Coming from San Luis Potosí, López Barrera entered the Islas Marías on 7 October 2000. He had been sentenced to 11 years and three months for possession and transport of marijuana.
- On 24 November 2011, six inmates tried to escape using plastic containers as flotation devices. They were reportedly carried by currents about 60 miles south of the island. A passing boat tipped authorities and they were promptly returned to the island prison.

== Administration ==
For many years the prison was administered by the Secretariat of the Interior. Over the years the prison population has fluctuated from 300 to 3000 prisoners.

In addition to prisoners, on Maria Madre island, there are employees of diverse institutions of the federal government, such as the Secretariat of Public Education, the Secretariat of the Environment, the Secretariat of Communications and Transport, Post Offices, and the Secretariat of the Navy.

Another group of settlers is made up of religious ministers and acolytes of the Catholic Church, nuns of the Order of Social Service, and invited teachers, technicians and their relatives.

The colony is governed by a state official who is both the governor of the islands and chief judge.

The military command is independent of the government and is exercised by an officer of the Mexican Navy.

The first chaplain in Islas Marías history was prisoner Arturo Salcido, who was sentenced for trafficking of drugs. Salcido built the first temple, and assembled the first Christian Church in the prison.
