= Oceania (board game) =

Oceania is a board game by Klaus Teuber, published by Mayfair Games. It is a simpler version of Entdecker, and is played with one or two players. The solitaire version's objective is completely different from the two player version's.

== Two-Player Version ==
Each player, in turn, places a wooden ship on one of the starting spaces or on a tile already placed. At the beginning of the game, of course, the only spaces available are starting spaces. These spaces appear on three sides of the board; the fourth side is a continuation of the ocean frame, but the ship cannot start there. Then, the player picks one tile from the top of the pile. Each tile has four sides, with water or land on each side. All of the possible combinations that have water on at least one side are included, with varying frequencies, in the pile. (The water, land, water, land tiles show two island fragments, one on each side with a strait going down the middle, not the other way around.) Tiles placed into the board must match water to water and land to land. If a tile fits, the player must place it. Each player has pieces in one of the two colors (white or black) depicting one, two, or three scouts. Players may place one scout piece on the tile that was placed if it has land on it (if it is the WLWL piece, the scout piece may be placed on either side). If a tile does not fit, it is placed in front of the player. Later in the game, the player may choose to give up one scout piece from the supply in order to place one of these pieces on the board. If an empty space is completely surrounded, it is filled with reserve tiles of the correct variety, which are next to the board. If a number of spaces are surrounded with only land, they are filled with tiles from the reserve pile that have land on all four sides.

The game can end in three ways:

1. When the tiles in the pile are used up.
2. When the entire board is filled.
3. When there are spaces that cannot be filled because of the side of the board that is considered water, but where the ship cannot start. If there are two or more consecutive spaces surrounded only by land and this fourth side, they cannot be filled.

On each island where one player has a majority of the scouts, that player receives points equal to the number of the tiles in the island. If the two island fragments of a WLWL tile are joined by other pieces that go around them, the tile still only counts as one tile. If the players are tied, nobody scores points. Tiles in front of a player because they could not be placed are each worth -2 points if the player has not given up a scout piece to place them. The winner is the player with the most points.

== One-Player Version ==
The scouts are not used in this game. The player repeatedly places the ship on the board and puts tiles out. A tile that does not fit is placed in a discard pile. The score is the sum of the squares of the number of tiles in each island, minus twenty points for each space that is not filled at the end of the game.

This version of the game can be played online at PlayCatan, even though it is not strictly a Catan game. This is because of its relationship to the Catan series (also created by Klaus Teuber and published by Mayfair Games), and because its parent game, Entdecker, can be viewed as the discovery of the island of Catan, as the publisher says at this link: .

== Reviews ==
- Pyramid
