= Ocean City =

Ocean City may refer to one of several places in the United States:

- Ocean City, Maryland, a prominent beach resort town in the mid-Atlantic region
- Ocean City, New Jersey, a family-oriented seaside resort town near Atlantic City
- Ocean City, North Carolina, a historically African-American district of North Topsail Beach, North Carolina
- Ocean City, Florida, a census-designated place (CDP) in Okaloosa County
- Ocean City, Washington, a sparsely populated CDP along the Pacific Coast

== See also ==
- West Ocean City, a small CDP in Worcester County, Maryland.
