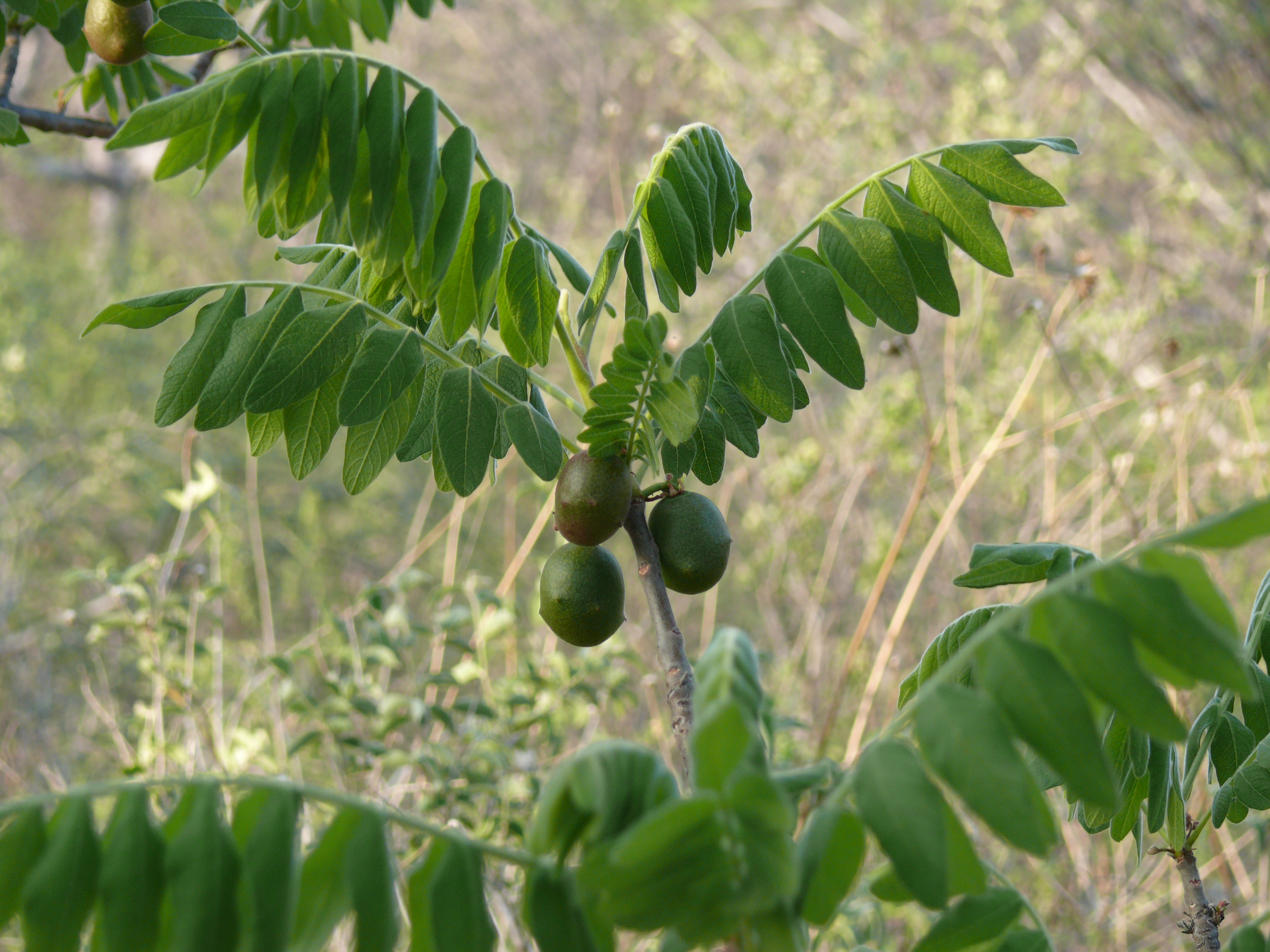

Scientific classification
- Kingdom: Plantae
- Clade: Tracheophytes
- Clade: Angiosperms
- Clade: Eudicots
- Clade: Rosids
- Order: Sapindales
- Family: Anacardiaceae
- Genus: Cyrtocarpa
- Species: C. procera

Binomial name
- Cyrtocarpa procera Kunth

= Cyrtocarpa procera =

Species of flowering plant

The Chupandia (Cyrtocarpa procera) is a tropical species of tree in the sumac family which is found throughout Mexico. It has been cultivated since ancient times, and its edible fruit is still popular in Mexico today. Its bark is used as a substitute for soap. It is a fast-growing tree and can reach a height of 6 meters.

== Uses ==
The small yellow fruit of the tree is edible, growing 2 centimeters in length. The fruit is resinous and has an acid flavor. It is popularly eaten in Mexico today.

The seeds of the fruit have been used in traditional medicine, including taking of them internally for treatment of leprosy. Various other parts of the plant have also been used for treating fevers, diarrhea, and dysentery.

The wood is purplish in color and has a strong scent. It is used for making trays and small images.

The bark can be used as a substitute for soap

== Propagation ==
Propagation is done through seed.
