= Oceanic =

Oceanic may refer to:

- Of or relating to the ocean
- Of or relating to Oceania
  - Oceanic climate
  - Oceanic languages
  - Oceanic person or people, also called "Pacific Islander(s)"

== Places ==
- Oceanic, British Columbia, a settlement on Smith Island, British Columbia, Canada
- Oceanic, New Jersey, an unincorporated community within Rumson Borough, Monmouth County, New Jersey, United States

== Art, entertainment, and media ==
=== Fictional entities ===
- Oceanic Airlines or Oceanic Airways, often used in disaster movies
- Oceanic Flight 815, a flight in the television series Lost

=== Literature ===
- "Oceanic" (novella), a 1998 sci-fi novella by Greg Egan

=== Music ===
Artists

- Oceanic (band), a 1990s UK dance/house act

Albums

- Oceanic (Isis album)
- Oceanic (Vangelis album)
- Oceanic, Emil Bulls album

Symphonies

- Oceanic days, Sunleif Rasmussen's Symphony no. 1

== Ships ==
- Oceanic (ship)

== Businesses ==
- Oceanic Bank of Nigeria
- Oceanic Time Warner Cable, a division of Time Warner Cable based in Hawaii
- Oceanic Worldwide, a manufacturer of scuba gear
- Oceanic, a French electronics brand since 1934

== Psychology ==
- Oceanic feeling, of "being one with the external world as a whole"

== Sports ==
- Rimouski Oceanic, a franchise of the Quebec Major Junior Hockey League in Canada

== See also ==
- Ocean (disambiguation)
- Oceania (disambiguation)
- Oceanus (disambiguation)
