= Correos de México =

National postal service of Mexico

Correos de Mexico
- Type: Government-owned corporation
- Industry: Courier
- Headquarters: Palacio de Correos de Mexico
- Key people: Purificación Carpinteyro, CEO
- Products: First-class and domestic mail, logistics
- Number of employees: 21,824
- Parent: Government of Mexico
- Website: correosdemexico.com.mx

Correos de México (English: Mails of Mexico), formerly named Servicio Postal Mexicano (Sepomex; English: Mexican Postal Service, MPS), is the national postal service of Mexico. It has been active for over 100 years, and its system has roots going back to 1580.

== Reorganization ==
In 1986, the government gave autonomy to the Postal Service. This was in response to the need to improve the service, which was considered one of the worst in the world and was facing more competition from private companies.

In order to compete with the private postal services like DHL, UPS, FedEx, Multipak, Estafeta and others the postal service created a new entity, "Mexpost," but more expensive than normal postal service but also more efficient working as a private company but still being part of the Mexican Postal Service.

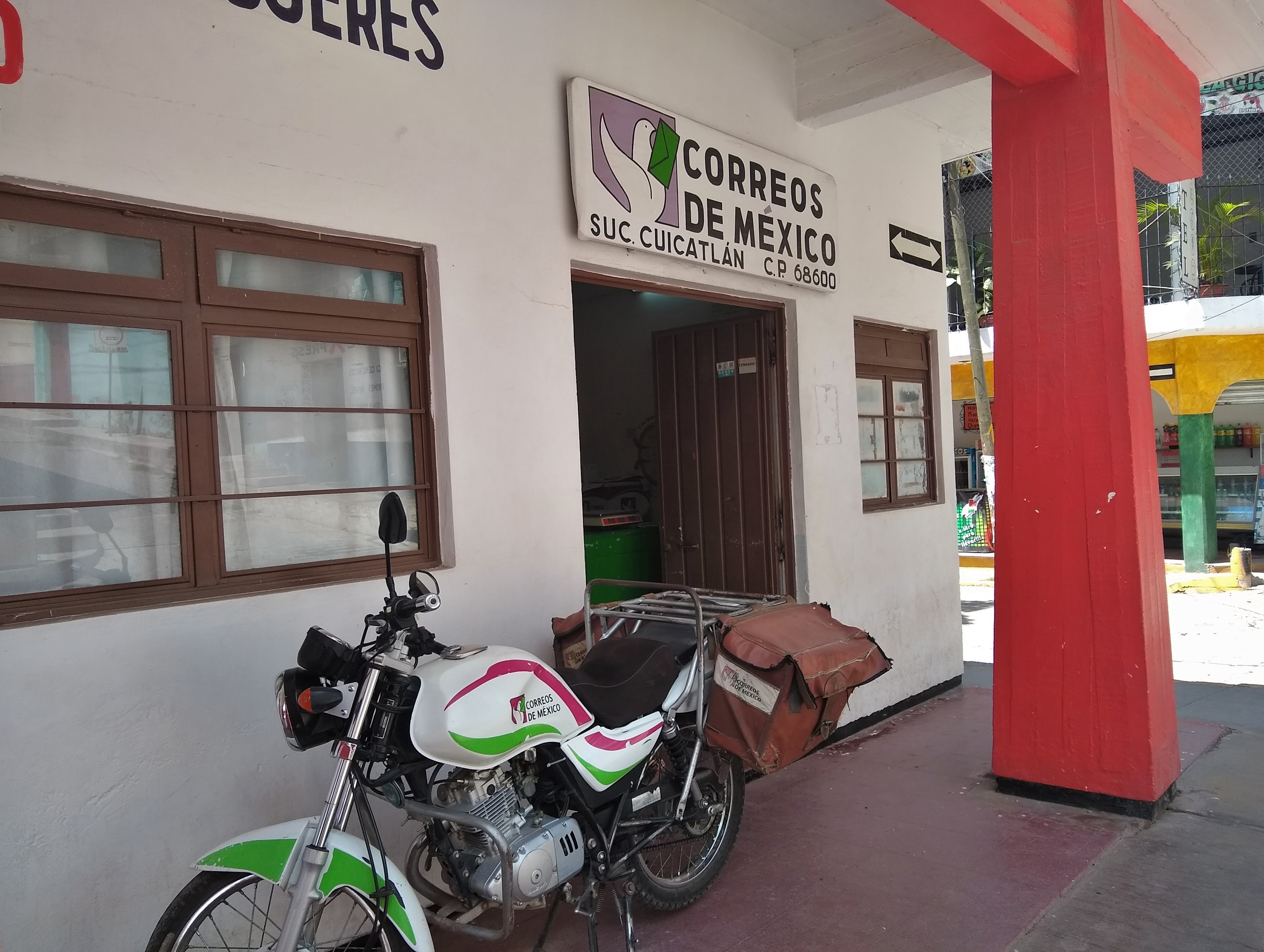
Post office in San Juan Bautista Cuicatlan and the typical mail delivery vehicle

== Recent history ==
In 2008, President Felipe Calderón ordered the overhaul of Servicio Postal Mexicano and rebranded it as Correos de México. Along with a new name and new image, created by Carl Forssell, the agency was restructured helping to streamline operations, improve performance, and expand postal outlets to non-traditional locations like private businesses.

== History ==
Pre-Hispanic precedents can be found in the organization of the Aztecs, who had several types of messengers: the painanis or "light feet" who transmitted religious messages and designs, the yucicatitlantis who carried urgent data to the metropolis, the tequihuatitlantis or messengers of war, and the tamemes who carried goods from any remote point of the Aztec Empire to Tenochtitlan (as an example, they carried fresh fish daily from Veracruz).

After the discovery and conquest, the Spanish crown considered it essential to establish communication between the New World and the Iberian Peninsula, to send and receive information between both sides of the Atlantic. To that effect, in 1514 Queen Juana I and in her name Ferdinand the Catholic, her father and regent, created the post of Correo Mayor de las Indias, through a Royal Decree. The correspondence until that moment had been in charge of the Casa de Contratación. The new post was created in the image and likeness of the Seville Correo Mayor in the form of a monopoly, which fell to Lorenzo Galindez de Carvajal, the Councillor of Castile, on a perpetual and hereditary basis. Faced with such responsibility and the impossibility of fulfilling the function of distributing the mail coming from the Peninsula to the Indies and vice versa, the system of leasing was used. The holders of these leases, in turn, and by means of powers of attorney, granted permission to those exercising the trade, lieutenants or deputies. After the death of the first owner, the job was transferred from one lessor to another. The position implied the provision of a service and entailed certain privileges or grants; it was developed by a private individual with the supervision and control of the Crown.

Just as in Lima and Seville the post of Correo Mayor was a royal donation in perpetuity, which would have required compensation from the Crown if the contract had expired. During the period of the delegation no money was handed over for exercising the office. The first delegate was Diego Daza, who died two years after taking office and who had recommended his collaborator Martín de Olivares. During the reign of Philip II, and by means of a decree issued on May 31, 1579, at the Aranjuez Palace, Don Martín de Olivares was named Correo Mayor de Hostas y Postas de la Nueva España (Main Post Office of Hostas and Postas of the New Spain), which was given to him by the Viceroy Don Martín Enríquez de Almansa, on August 27, 1580.

Martín de Olivares as a replacement practiced the trade for 25 years (1579-1604) with the same system of delegation and without receiving any money for it. At the beginning of the 17th century, when the practice of selling the royal offices in the Indian spaces began to be common, the delegation system changed for an auction system in which a private individual could pay to become a major mailman. To do so, he had to make a guarantee and win the auction proposal. Thus in 1604, the Viceroy Marquis of Montesclaros and the Secretary of New Spain in the Council of the Indies agreed that the post would be sold for 58,000 pesos. After a month of announcements, three candidates presented themselves to the auction, obtaining the position of Correo Mayor Alonso Diez, who was the first person to pay for a post office in the Indies.

The Correo Mayor established a system of lieutenants between the different New Spanish territories, in addition the position implied being Mayor of Mexico City. The position was established for life and not in perpetuity as in Peru. From the first auction in 1604, the Correo Mayor of New Spain acquired the category of "saleable and resignable". The Correo Mayor of New Spain had jurisdiction over a wide territory, from the south of the United States to Guatemala and from Acapulco to Veracruz. Correspondence from (or to) Europe and the Philippines circulated throughout this territory. During the 17th century, when the post was already being sold, it was the Diez de la Barrera (1604-1693) and Ximénez de los Cobos (1693-1760) families who served as Correos Mayores in New Spain.

Until the end of the seventeenth century, complaints and claims about the "Correo Mayor" were limited to occasional issues, delays, poor service or lack of security, and during the two centuries in which the post of Correo Mayor was active, none of them were relieved of their responsibility, and they carried out their duties until their death or their resignation. In 1697, however, the Mayor of New Spain, Pedro Ximénez de los Cobos, was accused of defrauding the Royal Treasury, and the denouncer was José Sarmiento de Valladares, Count of Moctezuma and Viceroy of New Spain. The accusation led to a confrontation between the highest viceregal authority and a member of the political elite born in Mexico City. By then, the post of Mayor allowed him to act as a Mayor with voice and vote of the city where the title had been acquired, which allowed him a real defense. Ximenez de los Cobos lived in the capital of New Spain (Mexico City) and worked with a network of lieutenants. His responsibilities were to guarantee the circulation of official documents within the viceroyalty and to provide sufficient logistics for the overseas mail to transit from the ports of Acapulco and Veracruz to Mexico City and other final destinations. In the most important cities it had a series of lieutenants who developed and guaranteed these missions. The accusation of fraud was widely echoed and the process involved an extensive memorial at the Council of the Indies, but in the end no action was taken against the person involved. The witnesses of the viceroy and the evidence presented were insufficient and this allowed Ximenez de los Cobos to reassert his position, which he abandoned in 1720 after resigning in favor of a relative. The judicial process implied a better administration and organization of the service, and in practice it led to a greater accounting of the trade, a documentary habit that facilitated in 1764 the elaboration of a complete survey of the cost of communication of the viceroyalty, which would be fundamental when addressing the Borbon reforms. The Real y Suprema Junta de Correos, established by Royal Decree of December 20, 1776, was the unique court in the postal area, and any civil or penal litigation, was its concern in any of its territories.

With the Bourbon reforms, also the postal services were transformed. In 1794 the Ordenanza General de Correos, Postas y Caminos was promulgated. In 1794, during the mandate of Godoy, the Ordinance developed by his predecessor, the Count of Aranda, was published. This legal body dealt extensively with all aspects related to those in charge, employees and services of the Post Office, both in the peninsula and in all American territories. It also established the functioning of the postal administrations, the estafetas or the Casas de Postas, gathering in this way all the subjects that had arisen throughout the century. In 1812, with the promulgation of the constitution of Cadiz, the Suprema y Real Junta de Correos was removed for being incompatible with the constitutional terms. The administrative issues would be passed to the Dirección General de Correos and the pending judicial matters to the courts of first instance.

With the Independence, part of the regulations of the 1794 Ordinance remained active. As for the post office income, it was in charge of the Secretariat of State and the Universal Office of Internal and External Relations. In 1824, this income and the administration was transferred to the Ministry of Finance. In 1830, the post office was expanded and included other territories, as new lines of communication were opened. In 1842, General Santa Ana reorganized the postal service and the tariff system, and this continued at the Ministry of Finance. The war with the United States disrupted the postal services, and it wasn't until October 31, 1849, when a Regulation on Postal Service Visitors was issued, establishing the obligations of these officials. By Regulation of August 28, 1852, the Post Office was reorganized, maintaining part of the 1794 regulations. The Mexican Constitution of 1857 kept the post office as a State monopoly. In 1856, Mexico embraced the postage system and the use of postal stamps. The first Mexican stamp went into circulation on August 1, 1856, with the portrait of Miguel Hidalgo. Stamps began to be sent on August 29, 1856. The stamp sheets had to bear the stamp of the issuing office to be valid and to avoid fraud.

During the Second Empire, attempts were made to bring some order to the postal service with an opening of the "monopoly". The Decree of 30 July 1863 allowed the circulation of correspondence in those places where there was no established postal line; this decree also introduced administrative changes.

Again with the Republic and from 1868 a critical campaign is developed in the press by the constant misplacements of newspapers and correspondence due to the bad service of correosː only in the year 1875 there were 423 serious alterations of the correspondence. On April 18, 1883, the First Postal Code was promulgated and came into effect on January 1, 1884. With this, the old postal system, which was based on the 1794 Ordinances, was terminated. Thus, the Spanish postal regulations were in effect for almost a century and served as the basis for the postal system of independent Mexico.

With the establishment of the First Mexican Postal Code, the first postal regulations were also created from Méxicoː the Reglamento y Manual de Organización de la Administración General de Correos, issued during the presidency of Manuel Gonzalez in 1884. In 1899, a new Postal Code was created.

On February 17, 1907, President Porfirio Díaz founded the "Palacio Postal" (Postal Palace) also known as the "Quinta Casa de Correos" (Fifth Postal House).

In 1921, Sepomex was in need of an international regulatory and unified postal service, and the Mexican government participated in the formation of the "Unión Panamericana de Correos" (Panamerican Postal Union) in Buenos Aires. In 1931, Spain joined the union, which changed the name to "Unión Postal de las Américas y España" (Postal Union of the Americas and Spain). In 1990, Portugal was added to the union, which again changed the name to "Unión Postal de las Américas, España y Portugal" (Postal Union of the Americas, Spain and Portugal).

In 1933, by presidential order, the postal service took control of the telegraph service in Mexico, creating the office "Dirección General de Correos y Telegrafos" (executive director of Postal Service and Telegraphs).

In 1942, the President ordered the separation of the postal service and telegraph into two entities.

== See also ==
- Postal codes in Mexico
