= HMS Ocean =

Six ships that were built for the Royal Navy have borne the name HMS Ocean. The name Ocean entered the list from which names are selected for British ships in 1759, when the Royal Navy captured the French ship named Océan. The British studied the French technology of this ship and admired it, but the ship had to be in bad shape before it would be replaced by a new-build.

- HMS Ocean (1761), was a 90-gun ship of the line built in 1761.
- HMS Ocean (1805), was a 98-gun ship of the line launched in 1805, active in the Napoleonic Wars, and later upgraded to a 110-gun first-rate.
- HMS Ocean (1863) was originally ordered to be built as a Bulwark-class wooden screw line-of battle ship intended to carry 91 guns. However, the order was changed and she was eventually launched in 1863 as a Prince Consort-class ironclad of 24 guns. In the late 1860s she served as flagship to the Commander-in-Chief, China and after an active life of only six years, was paid off in 1872.
- HMS Ocean (1898) was a Canopus-class pre-dreadnought battleship launched in 1898 and sunk by a mine in 1915.
- HMS Ocean (R68) was an Colossus-class aircraft carrier completed in 1945, served in the Korean War as an aircraft carrier, and the Suez Crisis as a helicopter platform and was scrapped in 1962.
- HMS Ocean (L12) was a Landing Platform, Helicopter (LPH) launched in 1995 and decommissioned in March 2018, after which she was transferred to the Brazilian Navy as Atlântico.

== Battle Honours ==
- Ushant 1781
- Mesopotamia 1914
- Suez Canal 1915
- Dardanelles 1915
- Korea 1952–53
- Al Faw 2003
