= French ship Océan =

Six French ships of the French Navy have borne the name Océan, after the Ocean:

- The 80-gun ship of the line Océan (1756)
- The 118-gun ship of the line Océan (1790)
- The armoured frigate Océan (1870)
- An auxiliary ship
- The dreadnought Jean Bart was renamed to Océan at the end of her career
- The heavy cruiser Suffren was renamed to Océan at the end of her career
