= Ocean (1802 ship) =

History

United Kingdom
- Name: Ocean
- Owner: 1804-1814: James Walker; 1815-1825:Rait & Co.
- Builder: Jack Beatson–Henry Baldwin, Quebec
- Launched: 21 June 1802
- Fate: Last listed 1825

General characteristics
- Tons burthen: 532, or 560, or 561, or 567, or 56789/94, or 572 (bm)
- Length: Overall:117 ft 2 in (35.7 m), or 120 ft (36.6 m); Keel: 92 ft 2 in (28.1 m)
- Beam: 32 ft 11 1/2 in (10.0 m)
- Depth of hold: 15 ft 8 in (4.8 m)
- Propulsion: Sail
- Sail plan: Full-rigged ship
- Complement: 50
- Armament: 16 × 12-pounder guns
- Notes: Two decks

Ocean was launched in 1802 at Quebec. She made five voyages under charter to the British East India Company (EIC) between 1804 and 1814. Her owners then sold her and she continued to sail between Britain and India under a license issued by the EIC. In 1815–1816 she made one voyage transporting convicts to Australia. She was last listed in 1825.

== Career ==
Ocean first appears in Lloyd's Register for 1804 with J. Walker, owner, M'Taggart, master, and trade London—India. The EIC had Ocean repaired by Brent in 1804. Then, for all five of her voyages for the EIC, Ocean's captain was Thomas McTaggart (or MacTaggart).

=== EIC Voyage #1 (1804-1805) ===
Because this voyage took place after the commencement of the Napoleonic Wars, Ocean sailed under a letter of marque that was issued to McTaggart on 30 June 1804.

Ocean left Portsmouth on 4 September 1804, bound for Madras and Bengal. She reached Madeira on 27 September and Madras on 17 February 1805, before arriving at Calcutta on 17 March. Homeward bound, she was at Culpee on 22 May and Saugor on 11 June. She reached St Helena on 22 October and arrived at the Downs on 22 December.

=== EIC Voyage #2 (1806-1807) ===
Ocean left Portsmouth on 10 June 1806, bound for St Helena, Bengal, and Benkulen. She was at St Helena on 27 August, and arrived at Diamond Harbour on 22 January 1807. She was at Saugor on 1 March, and Benkulen at 9 April. She reached St Helena on 16 August and arrived at the Downs on 10 November.

The officers and men of the EIC's ships Lord Keith and Dover Castle received salvage money in October 1810 for the recapture of Admiral Rainier on 31 December 1806, as did those of Ocean.

=== EIC Voyage #3 (1808-1810) ===
Ocean left Portsmouth on 17 September 1808, bound for Madeira, Madras, and Bengal. She reached Madeira on 28 September and Madras on 11 February 1809, before arriving at Calcutta on 28 March. She was a Diamond Harbour on 4 July and Saugor on 17 August. She was back at Calcutta on 13 September and Saugor on 19 October. She reached Madras on 19 December, the Cape on 19 February 1810, and St Helena on 27 April. She arrived at the Downs on 3 July.

=== EIC Voyage #4 (1811-1812) ===
Ocean left Torbay on 12 May 1811 bound for Madras and Bengal. She reached Madras on 10 September and arrived at Calcutta on 20 October. Homeward bound, she was at Saugor on 24 December, reached St Helena on 12 May 1812, and arrived at the Downs on 22 July.

=== EIC Voyage #5 (1813-1814) ===
Ocean sailed from Portsmouth on 18 March 1813, bound for Madras and Bengal. She reached Santa Cruz on 11 April, Madras on 17 August, and Saugor on 13 September, before arriving at Calcutta on 23 September. Homeward bound, she was at Saugor on 7 November, reached the Cape on 1 March 1814 and St Helena on 18 March, and arrived at the Downs on 31 May.

== Later career ==
Her owners sold her on 30 July 1814 at Lloyd's Coffee House for the West Indies trade. However, Ocean enters the Register of Shipping in 1815 with C. Rait as master, P. Rait as owner, and trade London—India. Apparently, rather than sailing to the West Indies, Ocean sailed to the East Indies under a license from the EIC.

In 1813 the EIC had lost its monopoly on the trade between India and Britain. British ships were then free to sail to India or the Indian Ocean under a licence from the EIC. Ocean's owners applied for a licence to trade with the East Indies on 10 November 1814, and were issue one that same day.

=== Convict transport (1815-1816) ===
Ocean underwent a good repair in 1815. Then under the command of Alexander Johnson, she sailed from England in August 1815 and arrived at Port Jackson on 20 January 1816. She transported 220 male convicts, of whom one died on the voyage.

Ocean left Port Jackson on 17 March bound for Batavia.

== Fate ==
By 1820 Ocean's master and owner was Johnson, and her trade was still London—India.

Ocean was last listed in the Register of Shipping in 1824. Her master and owner was Johnson, and her trade London–India. She was listed in Lloyd's Register in 1825 with A. Johnson, master, Rait & Co., owner, and trade London-India.
