= HDMS Brevdrageren =

Brig of the Royal Navy

History

Denmark
- Name: Brevdrageren
- Builder: Hohlenberg, Nyholm Dockyard
- Launched: 1801
- Fate: Surrendered to the British after the Battle of Copenhagen

United Kingdom
- Name: HMS Brev Drageren
- Acquired: Captured from Denmark 7 September 1807
- Commissioned: 1808
- Honours and awards: Naval General Service Medal with clasp "21 March Boat Service 1813"
- Fate: Sold for breaking 13 October 1825

General characteristics
- Class & type: Brevdrageren-class light brig
- Tons burthen: 18168/94 (bm)
- Length: 82 ft 8 1/2 in (25.2 m) (overall); 66 ft 0 1/8 in (20.1 m) (keel)
- Beam: 22 ft 9 in (6.9 m)
- Depth of hold: 10 ft 3 1/2 in (3.1 m)
- Sail plan: Brig
- Complement: In Danish Navy service: 57; In Royal Navy service: 60
- Armament: 2 × 6-pounder guns + 10 × 18-pounder carronades (Royal Navy service)

HDMS Brevdrageren (also Brev Drageren) was a Danish let brigger (light brig), launched in 1801 for the Royal Danish Navy. She was one of the many vessels the British captured from the Danish after the Battle of Copenhagen in 1807. She was subsequently added to the Royal Navy as HMS Brev Drageren, and was involved in two notable actions while in British service. She was sold in 1825.

== Construction and design ==
Brevdrageren was built at Bodenhoffs Plads to a design by F.C.H. Hohlenberg and launched in 1801. She was the name-ship of a two-vessel class, and both she and her sister Fama had distinctive pinched or "pink" sterns, that is, sterns that were rounded rather than the more normal square stern. Another vessel, Fehmern, was built similarly to Brevdrageren and her sister, but was slightly heavier. These vessels were much smaller than the heavy brigs designed for combat and the Danes used them as despatch vessels; Brevdrageren in Danish means "Despatch" or "Letter Carrier".

Her official Danish armament was eight 4-pounder guns and four 12-pounder carronades. Alternatively, she may have carried two 6-pounder guns, and sixteen 12-pounder carronades, since accounts differ.

== Danish service ==
In 1801, together with Søormen, she served as a tender to the naval cadet training ship. In 1802, commanded by Thomas Fasting, she once again served as a tender to the naval cadet training ship and in 1805, under captain F.C. Fisker, was a member of the Danish home squadron.

== British service ==
The Royal Navy surveyed Brev Drageren and refitted her at Chatham. She was commissioned under Lieutenant J. S. A. Dennis. In 1809 the Navy considered renaming her Cockatrice but that plan fell through. Command then passed to a Lieutenant Charles C. Dobson, who was later court martialed for an "unnatural crime" committed in September 1809 while in command.

On 24 August 1809, Patriot, was in company with the schooner Paz, the gun-vessel Jahde, and two boats detached from Brev Drageren and Censor. Together they captured property at Harlinger Zyl, together with a Danish privateer and a mutt in ballast.

=== Escape from three Danish Brigs, 1811 ===
Lieutenant Thomas Barker Devon, ex-First Lieutenant of Crocodile, took command of Brev Drageren on 12 October 1809. On 31 July 1811, Brev Drageren and Algerine were cruising together in Long Sound, Norway, when they encountered and engaged three Danish brigs, Lolland, under the command of Captain Hans Peter Holm, and Kiel and Lougen. (Note: James reports that the three Danish vessels were the 20-gun Langeland, the 18-gun Lügum, and the 16-gun Kiel. However, there are no Danish records of any vessel with the name Lügum, or anything like it, and one can infer from a biography of the captain of Langeland that she was not present at the action.) The Danes had 54 guns and 480 men, against the British 22 guns and 107 men; (Note: The Naval Chronicle gives the Danish strength as 60 guns (all long 18-pounders), and 550 men.) outnumbered and outgunned, the British vessels took flight.

The next day Brev Drageren unsuccessfully re-engaged first one and then two of the brigs. In the inconclusive engagement each British vessel sustained one man killed, and Brev Drageren also had three wounded. In the second day's fight, Algerine sent a boat and sweeps to Brev Drageren, which helped her escape the Danes, though not until after her crew had rowed for 30 hours. The Danes reported capturing two cargo ships (galleases) that Brev Drageren had been escorting.

=== Capture of Prizes off the Ems, 1812 ===
During 1812 Brev Drageren was stationed at Heligoland, which the British had captured in 1807. Here she made several minor captures. One capture was of a French privateer lugger and another was an armed customs-house vessel that Brev Drageren cut out from Delfzijl at the mouth of the river Ems. The second of these may have been a Danish privateer of one long gun and four swivel guns that the boats of Censor and Brev Drageren, under the command of Sub-Lieutenant George Anderson of Brev Drageren, cut out.

Between 18 and 25 March she captured Jeune Nicholas, Trois Freres, Vrow Johanna, Deux Freres, and the cargo Gerrit Peter Kripisz. Then on 17 April Brev Drageren was in company with Exertion when they captured the Noysonheid. (Note: A first-class share of the prize money was worth £23 3s 4d; a sixth-class share was worth £1 11s 1 1/2d.) Nightingale and Exertion captured the Deux Freres, Vrow, Anna Jacobs, and Deux Freres (2), on 3 June. (Note: A first-class share of the prize money was worth £14 11s 7 3/4d; a sixth-class share, that of an ordinary seaman, was worth 16s 7 1/4d.)

On 9 March 1813, Brev Drageren was in company with Nightingale when they captured the Danish sloop Enigheiden. (Note: A sixth-class share of the prize money was worth 4s 10 1/2d.)

=== Operations in the Elbe, 1813 ===
On 14 March 1813 Lieutenant Francis Banks, of the gun-brig Blazer, who commanded the small British force stationed off the island of Heligoland, received information that the Russian Army had entered Hamburg and that the French at Cuxhaven were in some distress. He took Brev Drageren and proceeded to the river Elbe to intercept any fleeing French vessels. Early in the morning he found two abandoned gun-vessels that he destroyed. Then the British found that the French were destroying their flotilla of 20 large gun schuyts. The next day, by invitation from the shore, Banks landed with 32 troops that he had embarked at Heligoland and took possession of the batteries of Cuxhaven. On 17 March he agreed a treaty with the civil authorities that the British flag should be hoisted in conjunction with the colours of Hamburg. The Russians agreed that they would deliver all the military stores they captured to the two British vessels.

Brev Drageren and Blazer shared in the prize money for the Ever Pascal, Deux Freres, Vrow Elizabeth, and stores at Cuxhaven and St. Cricq that they captured on 17 March. (Note: Devon and the captain of Blazer received £40 7s 3 3/4d each; ordinary seamen received £2 1s 1 3/4d each.)

On 21 March 1813, Devon took eight men and his 12-year-old brother, Midshipman Frederick Devon, in Brev Drageren's gig. William Dunbar, Master of Blazer, took 11 men in Blazer's cutter. Together the two boats went up river in search of a privateer reported to be in the area. Off the Danish port of Brunsbuttel they sighted two boats, one of which hailed them, ran up Danish colours and opened fire, fortunately over the heads of the British. Devon boarded the gunboat in the smoke of her second broadside, and possibly the explosion of some cartridges on her deck, and captured her. Blazer's cutter came up and together the British sailors succeeded in imprisoning the Danish crew below deck. The gunboat turned out to be the Jonge-Troutman. She was under the command of Lieutenant Lutkin, had a crew of 25 men and carried two 18-pounders and three 12-pounders. Dunbar and the cutter then turned their attention to the second gunboat, the Liebe, and captured her too. She was under the command of Lieutenant Writt and had the same establishment as the Jonge-Troutman. The British suffered no casualties and the Danes suffered two wounded.

Admiral Young, the commander-in-chief of the British navy in the area, wrote to Devon, asking him to convey to his men the Admiralty's approbations of their conduct. He acknowledged that "gun-boats make but bad prizes" and therefore pledged that his share of any prize money should be distributed to the crews of the boats. Prize money was paid in June 1815. (Note: A first-class share was worth £17 8s 9 1/2d; a sixth-class share was worth 17s 9d. In a second payment in 1817, a first-class share was worth £57 8s 1 1/4d; a sixth-class share was worth £4 7s 2 1/4d.)

In 1847 the Admiralty issued the Naval General Service Medal with clasp "21 March Boat Service 1813" to all surviving claimants of the action. There were three claimants. Frederick Devon was one. The other two went to Thomas Davies, then Assistant Surgeon of Brev Drageren and James Whiteman, then a Private in the Royal Marines, stationed on Blazer.

On 4 May Devon received a promotion to commander. Brev Drageren was re-rated as a sloop-of-war so that he could continue in command.

=== Operations in the Ems, 1813 ===
Then on 10 July 1813 Brev Drageren was part of a squadron that captured eight small vessels in the Elbe and Weser. The squadron included Desiree, Calliope, Shamrock, Thrasher, the hired armed cutter Princess Augusta, and gunboats. (Note: The prize money for an ordinary seaman for the eight small vessels was 15s 9 3/4d.)

In August Brev Drageren was in company with Redbreast when they captured the Danish droits Haabet and Evers, No. 73 and 123, on the 13th and 14th. (Note: The captains received £17 13s 2d each; ordinary seamen received 7s 2 1/2d each.)

In October 1813 Captain Arthur Farquhar, of the 18-pounder 36-gun frigate Desiree, arrived at Heligoland to assume command of the British naval forces there, including Brev Drageren. Brev Drageren, together with two gun-vessels, blockaded Delfzijl, which the French had fortified, by anchoring just outside the range of the French batteries. In this way she contained 17 armed vessels in the port. Devon also assisted in repelling numerous French sorties. Nevertheless, the French held out until the Allies occupied Paris in April 1814. During this period, Brev Drageren captured Enigheid on 27 October. (Note: A first-class share of the prize money was worth £9 3s 8d; a sixth-class share was worth 7s 3 3/4d.)

Devon came into conflict with the Prussian authorities when he prevented them from seizing spars in the custody of a British government agent. This resulted in Brev Drageren being recalled to England in July, though no blame attached to Devon.

== Fate ==
Being unfit for further service, Brev Drageren was hulked as a tender in 1815. On 6 January 1817 the Thames River police took her over for use as a depot. In July 1818 she became a prison ship and served in that capacity until 1820, when she became an Army depot ship. On 24 September 1825 the Navy listed her as available for sale. On 13 October 1825 Joshua Crystall bought Brev Drageren for breaking up.
