= HMS Thrasher (1804) =

Brig of the Royal Navy

History

United Kingdom
- Name: Adamant
- Builder: Warren, Brightlingsea, or Colchester
- Launched: 1804
- Fate: Sold 1804

United Kingdom
- Name: HMS Thrasher
- Acquired: June 1804 by purchase
- Fate: Sold 3 November 1814

United Kingdom
- Name: Adamant
- Acquired: 1814 by purchase
- Fate: Wrecked 3 December 1815

General characteristics
- Tons burthen: 150, or 153, or 184 (bm)
- Complement: 45 (RN)
- Armament: RN: 2 × 9-pounder chase guns + 10 × 18-pounder carronades; 1815: 6 guns

HMS Thrasher was launched in 1804 at Brightlingsea, or Colchester as the merchant vessel Adamant. The British Royal Navy purchased her in June 1804, renamed her, and fitted her out as a gunbrig. She captured numerous small merchant vessels, most of them Dutch or Danish. After the Navy sold her in 1814, she returned to mercantile service under her original name of Adamant. She made a voyage to Malta in 1815 and was wrecked as she was returning to London.

== Merchantman ==
Adamant first appeared in Lloyd's Register (LR) in 1804.

Year	Master	Owner	Trade	Source
1804	W.Spalton	Warran	London–Lisbon	LR

Warren had owned an earlier Adamant, with Spalton, master, but had sold her in August 1803 to the Royal Navy, which had fitted her out and commissioned her as the sloop HMS Bonetta.

== Royal Navy ==
The Navy purchased the Adamant of this article in June 1804. She underwent fitting by Thompson, on the Thames, between June and 7 July, and then at Deptford Dockyard until 5 September. In July Lieutenant William Chester commissioned Thrasher for the Downs.

Lieutenant Samuel Knight took command in March 1805.

In 1806 Thrasher was temporarily reclassified as a fireship under the command of Lieutenant John Forfar. Lieutenant Josiah Dornford replaced Forfar on 28 July 1807. From August 1807 Thrasher served in the Downs and off the Texel.

In July 1807 Thrasher detained and sent into the Downs Providentia, Richeljen, master, from Bordeaux to Tonningen, and Gute Hensight, Cooke, master, from Bordeaux to Copenhagen. Both vessels were Danish.

On 22 December 1808, Thrasher brought into Ramsgate Rose in June, George master. Thatcher had found Rose in June near Dungeness, dismasted. She had been sailing from Cork before her crew abandoned her.

On 26 March 1809 Thrasher sailed from Dungeness early in the morning and sailed towards Boulogne. As she approached the coast she saw some 40 French vessels, including six brigs and two schooners. Thrasher sailed along the flotilla from 7am to 2pm, engaging it from both broadsides. The French ships blocked the shore batteries from firing on Thrasher. Thrasher sank three vessels, drove six ashore, and forced several to return to port.

In August–September 1809 Thrasher took part in the ill-fated Walcheren Campaign.

Thrasher, Lieutenant Dornford, captured Noitgedejt on 15 May 1810.

On 4 July 1810 Thrasher and Bruiser captured Twe Gebroders.

On 24 August Thrasher and Bruiser captured Revanche, a lugger boat privateer.

On 8 September Thrasher captured Drie Gesuisters, Gute Hoffnung, and Frau Catharina. (Note: A first-class share of the prize money was worth £23 3s 6½d; a sixth-class, that of an ordinary seaman, was worth 9s 1½d.)

Thrasher and Bruiser were in company and shared in the prize money for the captures on 21 April 1811 of Frau Anna, Jonge Andreas, Junge Catharina, Fran Maria, and Frau Gretje.

On 19 August Thrasher captured Secfrau.

Thrasher, Pincher, and Parthian were in company on 22 and 25 October 1811 when they captured To Wenner, Esperance, and Jeune Remmer. A Danish vessel that was a prize to the three British ships stranded on Sandy Island. It was expected that part of her cargo of pitch, tar, oil, and fish would be saved.

On 24 September 1812, Thrasher captured Jonge Cornelius.

Thrasher and Redbreast were in company on 1 November at the capture of Mercurius, Pusche, master. Mercurius arrived at Yarmouth on 11 November.

On 3 March 1813, Thrasher Lieutenant Dornford, and Blazer captured the American schooner Sea Nymph. Nymph, had been sailing from New York to Amsterdam. Her captors brought Nymph into Heligoland. A violent gale on 7 March drove Nymph on to Sandy Island, wrecking her. However, most of the cargo was saved. (Note: A first-class share was worth £297 13s 0¼d; a sixth-class share was worth £14 13s 6¾d.)

Then on 10 July Thrasher was part of a squadron that captured eight small vessels in the Elbe and Weser. The squadron included Desiree, Calliope, Shamrock, Brev Drageren, the hired armed cutter Princess Augusta, and gunboats. (Note: The prize money for an ordinary seaman for the eight small vessels was 15s 9¾d.)

On 27 or 28 October Thrasher, under Lieutenant Dornford, was in company with Calliope. The shared in the proceeds of the capture on that day of Frou Margaretha (or Frau Margaretha). (Note: A first-class share of the prize money was worth £23 3s 6½d; a sixth-class was worth 9s 1½d. A second-class share was worth £5 15s 10¾d.)

On 14 November Thrasher captured Anna. (Note: A second-class share, (master), was worth £18 5s 4d; a sixth-class share was worth £1 19s 7d.)

At some point in 1813 Thrasher brought over to England the officer charged with the important intelligence of the French having been driven across the Rhine. On another occasion, Thrasher brought the Russian General Tchaplitz, to whom had been entrusted the keys of Hamburg.

Dornford left Thrasher on 14 July 1814.

Disposal: The "Principal Offices and Commissioners of His Majesty's Navy" offered the "Thrasher gun-brig, of 150 tons", lying at Chatham, for sale on 3 November 1814. She sold on that day for £970.

== Merchantman again ==
The purchasers of Thrasher returned her to the name Adamant. Although she re-entered Lloyd's Register, neither Lloyd's Register, nor the Register of Shipping, recorded the transition. Still, accounts of her wrecking in 1815 make the transition clear (see below).

Year	Master	Owner	Trade	Source
1815	Woodcock	Jn.Short	London–Mediterranean	LR

On 14 May 1815, Adamant, Woodcock, master, sailed from Gravesend for Malta. She arrived at Malta on 24 June, having come via Falmouth.

== Fate ==
On 3 December 1815 Adamant, Woodcock, master, was driven ashore near Seaford, Sussex. She was refloated and made for Newhaven, Sussex but subsequently was wrecked. Her crew were rescued. Adamant was on a voyage from Malta to London. A week later Lloyd's List reported that Adamant had gone to pieces, but that some of her cargo and part of the materials had been saved.

Later in December 1815, the Morning Post wrote: "The Adamant, from Malta, which was lately wrecked off Newhaven, in Sussex, was originally a King's ship, called the Thrasher gun-brig, and copper-bottomed. The cargo and vessel was besieged by the inhabitants for miles round the country, who considered them fair game for plunder." The story went on to explain that the underwriters from Lloyd's Coffee House, valuing vessel and cargo at perhaps £100,000, engaged two officers from the Bow Street Office, to try to recover some of the cargo and to arrest the ringleaders. The officers received the cooperation of local Custom's officials. They searched some 200 houses and found plunder in many, including sacks of copper sheathing from Adamant; they also arrested some individuals. Many inhabitants were astonished at the idea that they had done anything wrong, "considering it an undisputed and ancient right for the inhabitants near a spot where a wreck takes place, to take whatever of the vessel and cargo they could take from the sea."
