= List of comics about the September 11 attacks =

Cover of 9-11: Artists Respond, Volume One

Comics about the September 11 attacks were published following the terrorist attacks in New York City, Arlington, and Pennsylvania on September 11, 2001, and cartoonists turned to art to express their grief and support for relief efforts.

== Titles and synopses ==
- 9-11: Artists Respond, Volume One and 9-11: The World's Finest Comic Book Writers & Artists Tell Stories to Remember, Volume Two, feature short stories and single-page work from a wide variety of artists.
- The Amazing Spider-Man volume 2 #36 explores how Spider-Man and other Marvel characters like Captain America, Daredevil, Doctor Doom, and Magneto react in the aftermath of the attacks. Also called the "Black Issue" for the solid black cover.
- The Big Lie, by Rick Veitch, involves a woman travelling back in time in an attempt to save the lives of those in the WTC at the time of the attack.
- The Boys, by Garth Ennis, shows three of the four hijacked planes being shot down by the Air Force, and the fourth being intercepted by superheroes; that plane subsequently crashed on the Brooklyn Bridge, destroying it and killing over a thousand people.
- The Call of Duty, a series about first responders: EMTs, firefighters, and police officers.
- Cartoonists Remember 9/11, a selection of comic strip titles from the five largest syndicates all ran comics commemorating the 10th anniversary of 9/11.
- Ex Machina by Brian K. Vaughan and published by WildStorm/DC, is set in a world in which a superhero called the Great Machine becomes mayor of New York after intervening in the September 11 attacks.
- Heroes, a book of sixty-four full-page illustrations paying tribute to those who attempted to save lives on 9/11.
- Human Target #2–3, "The Unshredded Man" (Parts 1 & 2) by Peter Milligan feature a man who had faked his own death in the WTC attacks to escape embezzlement charges, but who is now given the opportunity to come clean.
- A Moment of Silence features four wordless stories reflecting different perspectives on September 11, all inspired by true events. Includes an introduction by then-New York City mayor Rudy Giuliani.

=== Non-fiction comics about the September 11 attacks ===
- The 9/11 Report: A Graphic Adaptation (ISBN 0-8090-5739-5), by Sid Jacobson and Ernie Colón, and published by Hill & Wang, is an abridged graphic novel adaptation of the 9/11 Commission Report.
- In the Shadow of No Towers (2004) by Art Spiegelman. A graphic novel that mourns both 9/11 and the political uses to which it has been put.
- I Love New York by Joseph Michael Linsner presents his perceptions as a native New Yorker on that day.

== Benefit books ==
Title	Publisher	ISBN	Proceeds to
9-11: Artists Respond, Volume One	Dark Horse Comics, Chaos! Comics, and Image Comics	1-56389-881-0	The World Trade Center Relief Fund, Survivors Fund, September 11th Fund, and the Twin Towers Fund
9-11: The World's Finest Comic Book Writers & Artists Tell Stories to Remember, Volume Two	DC Comics	1-56389-878-0	The World Trade Center Relief Fund, Survivors Fund, September 11th Fund, and the Twin Towers Fund
9-11: Emergency Relief	Alternative Comics	1-891867-12-1	The American Red Cross
Heroes	Marvel Comics	ISBN	The Twin Towers Fund
I Love New York	Linsner.com, Sirius Entertainment	ISBN	The American Red Cross
A Moment of Silence	Marvel Comics	ISBN	The Twin Towers Fund

=== Contributors ===
==== 9-11: Artists Respond, Volume One ====
Cover by Eric Drooker

- Writer/Artists:

Brian Biggs, Mike Diana, Dylan Horrocks, Roger Langridge, Liniers, R. Sikoryak, Dean Motter, Jon J. Muth, Dave Cooper, Will Eisner, Batton Lash, Frank Miller, Al Davison, Bryan Talbot, David Alvarez, Layla Lawlor, Tony Millionaire, Mira Friedmann, Mark Crilley, Doug TenNapel, P. Craig Russell, Tommy Lee Edwards, Mitch O'Connell, David Chelsea, Sam Henderson, Ron Boyd, Phil Elliott, Stan Sakai, Jim Mahfood, Paul Chadwick, Darko Macan, Leland Myrick, John Paul Leon, William Stout, Marc Rosenthal, Enrico Casarosa, Mark Martin, Brian McDonald, Brian O'Connell, Terry Anderson, Becky Cloonan, Eric Drooker, Chris Eliopoulos, Davide Fabbri, Tatiana Gill, Steve Guaraccia, Jim Hill, Eric Kilkenny, Scott Morse, Peter Pachoumis, Nijo Philip, Lark Pien, Bill Pressing, Aaron Renier, Laurie Ross, Paul Sloboda, John K. Snyder III, Kellie Strom, and Jim Valentino.

- Writers:

Alan Moore, Joe Casey, Jeph Loeb, Robert Smigel, Roger Stern, John Ostrander, Trina Robbins, J. Torres, Fabian Nicieza, Mike Carey, Jason Hall, Steve Darnall, Stephen Banes, Art (Ferran) Brooks, Marie Croall, Tom DeFalco, Bob Harris, Antony Johnston, Dan Jolley, Robert Kirkman, Pablo Maiztegui, John McCrae, Steve Niles, Marti Noxon, Brian Pulido, Jamie S. Rich, Randy Stradley, Stephen Walsh, and Walt Whitman.

- Artists:

Renée French, Dave McKean, Dave Gibbons, Peter Kuper, Paul Lee, Sean Phillips, Mike Collins, Guy Davis, Michael Kupperman, Kevin Nowlan, Humberto Ramos, José Luis Ágreda, Alex Maleev, Ivan Reis, Hilary Barta, Guy Burwell, Chynna Clugston, Rick Ketcham, Cliff Richards, Joe Pimental, Daniel Acuña, Mike Huddleston, J. Scott Campbell, Anne Timmons, Carlos Meglia, Melinda Gebbie, Pat Moriarity, Enrique Alcatena (as Alcatena), Istvan Banyai, Dawn Brown, Will Conrad, Bill Dodge, Mike Getsiv, Rich Hedden, Todd Herman, Francisco Solano Lopez, Mary Mitchell, Tony Moore, Mike Norton, Joe Orsak, Eric Powell, Steve Rolston, Gregory Ruth, Tsuneo Sanda, Robert Solanovic, Ben Stenback, Lee Townsend, Kelly Yates, and Leinil Francis Yu.

==== 9-11: The World's Finest Comic Book Writers & Artists Tell Stories to Remember, Volume Two ====
Cover by Alex Ross

- Writers: Pat McGreal, Neil Gaiman, Steven T. Seagle, Peter Gross, Ed Brubaker, Brian Azzarello, Jamie Delano, Brian K. Vaughan, Stan Lee, Will Eisner, Jeph Loeb, Kurt Busiek, Jo Duffy, J. M. DeMatteis, Joe Kelly, Geoff Johns, Ben Raab, Rick Veitch, Dan Jurgens, Paul Levitz, Keith Giffen, Marv Wolfman, Denny O'Neil, Michael Moorcock, David S. Goyer, Mike Carey, Hilary Bader, Eddie Berganza, James Denning, Andy Helfer, Chuck Kim, Josh Krach, Dwayne McDuffie, Don McGregor, Jennifer Moore, Ashley-Jayne Nicolaus, Chris Sequeira, Alex Simmons, and Beau Smith.
- Artists: Anijel Zezelj, Stephen John Phillips, Dave McKean, Chris Bachalo, Kyle Baker, John Bolton, Glenn Fabry, Dave Gibbons, Alex Ross, Jill Thompson, John Van Fleet, Michael Zulli, Steve Leialoha, Paul Pope, Darick Robertson, Eduardo Risso, Goran Sudzuka, Angelo Torres, Bob Wiacek, Sandra Hope, Jim Lee, Brian Stelfreeze, Neal Adams, Barry Kitson, Tom Palmer, Dan Panosian, Phil Jimenez, Mike Collins, David Lloyd, Todd Nauck, Tom Grummett, Scott Kolins, Keith Champagne, Rich Faber, Guy Davis, Phil Noto, Ande Parks, Mark Farmer, Sergio Aragonés, Humberto Ramos, Brent Anderson, Carlos Pacheco, Jésus Merino, Richard Corben, Walter Simonson, Tim Sale, Scott McDaniel, Phil Hester, Aaron Sowd, Rick Burchett, Sergio Cariello, Joe Staton, Bob Smith, Kieron Dwyer, Marie Severin, Val Semeiks, James Pascoe, Denys Cowan, Alan Davis, José Luis García-López, Steven Parke, Yanick Paquette, Steve Scott, Prentis Rollins, Alex Horley, Ariel Olivetti, Christopher Moeller, Romeo Tanghal, Jim Royal, Pete Woods, Lee Bermejo, Enrique Breccia, John Cebellero, Cliff Wu Chiang, Marcelo Frusin, Greg Hildebrandt, Tim Hildebrandt, Daniel Janke, Jamie Mendoza, Robin Riggs, Roger Robinson, Duncan Rouleau, Eman Torre, and William Wray.

==== 9-11: Emergency Relief ====
Cover by Frank Cho

- Nick Abadzis, Jessica Abel, Jason Alexander, David Alvarez, Graham Annable, Donna Barr, Tom Beland, Gregory Benton, Nick Bertozzi, Joyce Brabner, Frank Cho, Hearn Jay Cho, Mavis Chu, Brian Clopper, Nikki Coffman, Daniel Cooney, Guy Davis, Tom Derenick, Danny Donovan, Will Eisner, Steve Ellis, Fly, Evan Forsch, Renée French, Jenny Gonzalez, Derek Gray, Eric Wolfe Hanson, Tomer Hanuka, Jim Harrison, Tom Hart, Dean Haspiel, Jon Bean Hastings, Marc Hempel, Phillip Hester, Sam Hester, K. Thor Jensen, Neil Kleid, Keith Knight, Chris Knowle, James Kochalka, James Kuhoric, Peter Kuper, Michael Kupperman, Greg LaRocque, David Lasky, Layla Lawlor, Carol Lay, A. David Lewis, Ellen Lindner, Mike Manley, Jason Martin, Laurenn McCubbin, Darren Merinuk, metaphrog, Tony Millionaire, Gray Morrow, Scott Morse, Jason Narvaez, Josh Neufeld, Phil Noto, Michael Avon Oeming, Peter Palmiotti, Ande Parks, Harvey Pekar, Chris Pitzer, Evan Quiring, Ted Rall, Andrew Ristaino, Alex Robinson, Harry Roland, David Roman, Gail Simone, Jeff Smith, Tommy Sommerville, Jen Sorensen, John Staton, Mark Stegbauer, Steve Stegelin, Eric Theriault, Robert Ullman, Neil Vokes, Lauren Weinstein, Mark Wheatley, Shannon Wheeler, Ashley Wood, and Meredith Yayanos.

==== A Moment of Silence ====
Cover by Joe Quesada and Alex Ross

- Brian Michael Bendis, Scott Morse, Kevin Smith, John Romita Jr., Bill Jemas, Mark Bagley, Joe Quesada, and Igor Kordey.

== See also ==
- Heroes for Hope
- Heroes Against Hunger
