= Hired armed cutter Princess Augusta =

His Majesty's Hired armed cutter Princess Augusta served the Royal Navy from 12 July 1803 to 2 May 1814. She was armed with eight 4-pounder guns, had a complement of 26 men, and was of 7056/94 tons (bm). She participated in several single ship actions and took several prizes before the Navy returned her to her owners near the end of the Napoleonic Wars.

== Service ==
In 1803 Lieutenant Isaac William Scott took command of Princess Augusta for the North Sea. In the second week of September she delivered orders from Lord Keith to warships off Hellevoetsluis, Texel and the Elbe.

=== Princess Augusta vs. Two Dutch privateers ===
On 20 September, 45 miles northeast of Texel, she encountered two schooners that bore down on her and opened fire, killing two of Princess Augusta's crew and mortally wounding Scott. The two schooners were Dutch: Union, under Lieutenant Commander St. Faust, of 12 guns and 70 men, and Wraak, under Lieutenant Commander Doudet, of eight guns and 50 men. The Dutch attempted to board but were unable to do so. Eventually, they sailed off. In addition to the two men killed in the initial broadside, Princess Augusta had suffered three wounded, including Scott, who died the next morning. Command devolved on her Master, Joseph Thomas, who made for Dover. The tide was against them and they were unable to land until the afternoon of 23 September. Wraak reportedly lost one man killed and several wounded. (Seven years later Thomas would be in command of the Hired armed cutter Queen Charlotte when he would participate in another, bloodier, but equally successful fight against great odds.) (Note: The Lloyd's Patriotic Fund awarded Thomas £200, and established an annuity for life of £30 for Scott's widow and an annuity of £10 for their unborn child until it should reach age 21. It also established annuities of lesser amounts for the survivors of the other crewmen who died in the action.)

Later, someone signing himself "De Faust" wrote a letter to the Delft Courant claiming, inter alia, that Unie (Union) had carried only four small guns when he had put to flight Princess Augusta, of fourteen 8-pounder guns. He further asserted that only her sailing off had prevented him from boarding her.

=== Prize taking ===
On 13 June 1804, while under the command of Lieutenant John Tracey, Princess Augusta, with a crew of only 25 men, encountered a 14-gun French privateer off Huntcliff. Initially, Princess Augusta took the brig for a collier, but the brig's crowded decks signalled that she was a privateer. During the four-hour engagement Princess Augusta took several shot near the water line and sustained extensive damage to her rigging. Still, she suffered only three men wounded, though one desperately. The French vessel veered off on the approach of two schooners manned with Sea Fencibles from Redcar. The French privateer reportedly was under the command of a notorious pirate known as "Blackman".

Towards the end of 1806 Princess Augusta captured several vessels. These were Neptunus (4 November), Onverwaght and Vrow Johanna (20 November), and Kitty (11 December). She also captured Morganstern, a fishing vessel, on 11 December.

On 27 January 1807, while 45 miles off Lowestoft, Princess Augusta sighted a French privateer cutter and chased her for three hours. Tracey was eventually able to get alongside and after firing some guns and small arms into her, she struck. She was Jena, commanded by Captain Francis Capelle, of four guns and 30 men. She also had a great number of small arms on board. She was 12 days out of Flushing and had made two captures. The next day Princess Augusta recaptured Jena's prizes, Sophia and Courieur, one of them a Prussian ship, laden with timber and bound to London. Later that year Tracey transferred to the brig Linnet.

On 19 February 1807 Carrier chased the French privateer cutter Chasseur into the hands of Ariadne. At the time, Carrier was also in company with the hired armed cutters Princess Augusta, under the command of Lieutenant John Jenkins, and Princess of Wales.

As Carrier was returning to her station, together with Princess Augusta, at 9 a.m. she sighted a suspicious sail ten leagues from Goree. After a chase of five hours she caught up with the French privateer schooner Ragotin. Ragotin, under the command of Jaques Jappie, carried eight guns, which she had thrown overboard during the chase, and a crew of 29 men. She was eight days out of Dunkirk, on her first cruise, and had not made any captures.

By June 1807 Princess Augusta was under the command of Lieutenant Robert Jordan. On 2 June she captured Frau Barbara and Frau Gerina. On 26 July she captured Goede Hoope. Then on 10 October she re-captured the Cadiz Packet. On 19 November, she re-captured Sunneside. Lastly, on 30 December, she was under the command of Lieutenant Andrew McCulloch when she recaptured the Swedish brig Frederica.

On 15 February 1808, Princess Augusta captured Johanna.

While cruising some 40 miles north-west of the Texel on the evening of 5 March Princess Augusta encountered a French privateer cutter. After chasing her for 24 hours McCulloch drove her on shore at Katwick (Katwijk-aan-Zee near The Hague). As the winds were too strong to deploy the boats, he took the cutter in as close as possible and exchanged fire. By the evening of 8 March the weather moderated. The boats went in under a heavy small arms fire from the shore and destroyed the French boat. Fishermen told McCulloch that the privateer was Dunkerquois, of Dunkirk, mounting four 3-pounders and with a crew of 45 men. She was formerly the Revenue cutter Nimble of Deal.

On 7 April Princess Augusta recaptured the galiot Aurora. Four days later, Princess Augusta and the hired armed cutter Alert recaptured Louisa, Vier Gebrooders, Twee Gebrooders, and Musche. The brig Safeguard shared in the capture of Musche.

On 17 July, in company with Alert, Princess Augusta captured Femme Fama, Deux Freres, and Hilkje Maria. Princess Augusta was in company with the gun-brig Richmond and Skylark when they captured the Dutch fishing vessels Meernia, Johanna, and Stadt Olderberg on 20 August 1808. Next, Princess Augusta captured the Swedish ship Midas on 10 November 1808.

=== Cutting-out expedition ===
On 21 July 1811, while still under McCulloch's command, she captured Vrow Geertje, alias La Femme Gertrude, Le Vrow Jantje, La Marguerita, Drey Gebroadrs, and Vry Gewaagt.

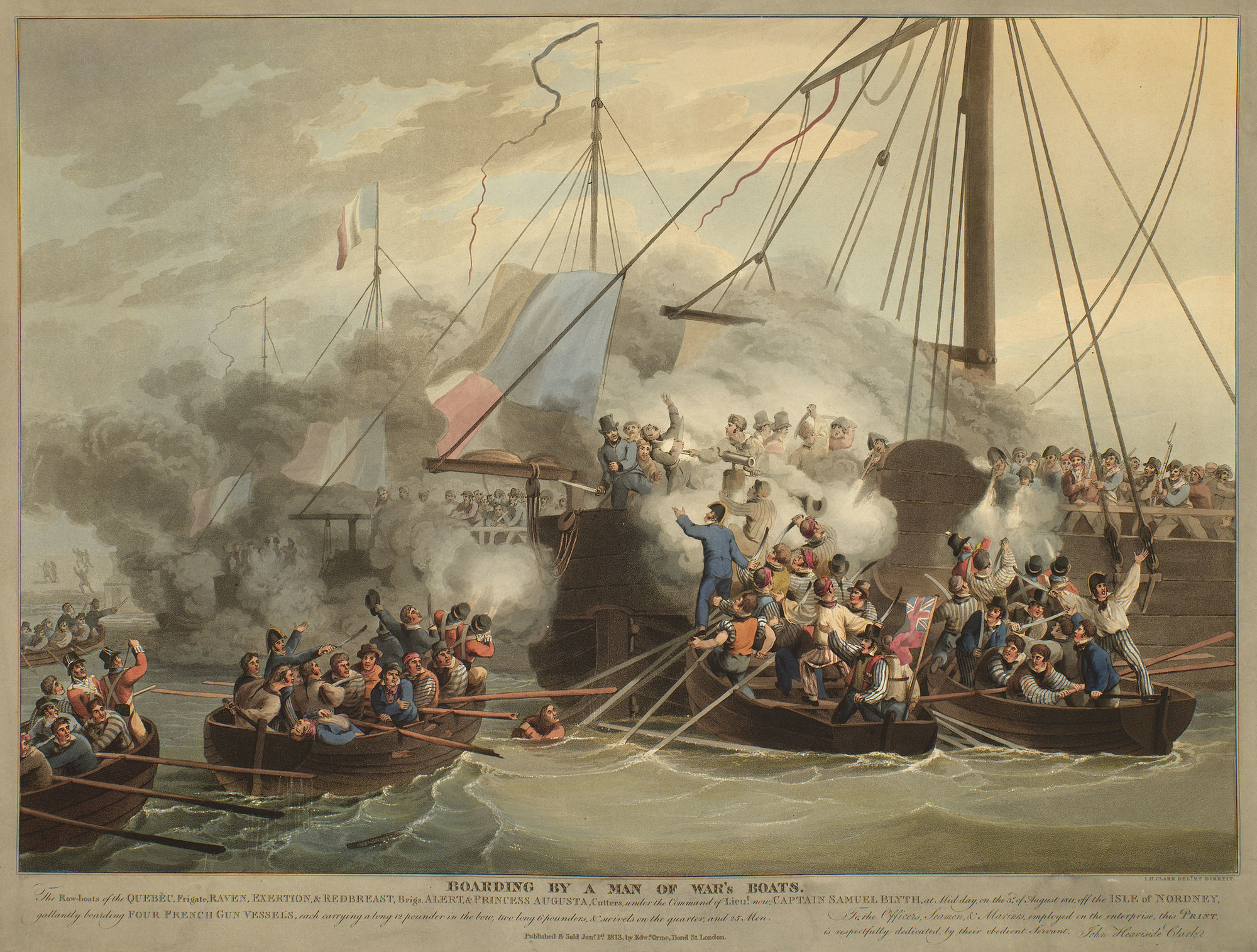
Boats from the Princess Augusta boarding the French gun vessels at Norderney, 3 August 1811

Ten days later, on 1 August, Princess Augusta and Alert were part of a small squadron cruising off the coast between the Texel and the Elbe. The squadron was under the command of Captain Charles Sibthorpe Hawtayne of the 32-gun frigate Quebec. The other vessels of the squadron were the 16-gun brig Raven, Commander George Gustavus Lennock, and the gun-brigs Exertion and Redbreast, Lieutenants James Murray and Sir George Mouat Keith, baronet. The squadron received intelligence from earlier captures of four Danish gun brigs lying at anchor at the island of Nordeney, and Hawtayne sent in a cutting-out party of 10 boats. Each Danish vessel had a crew of 25 men.

The Danes were ready, and fired on the boats as they approached. The British immediately boarded and carried the first vessel but the other three resisted longer.

Princess Augusta had one man killed and one wounded. The pilot to the expedition, James Muggeridge of Princess Augusta, was among the wounded. He was a volunteer and so not entitled to any disability pension, but fortunately his wound was minor. In all, the British lost four killed and 14 wounded. The Danes lost two men killed and ten men wounded. In 1847 the Admiralty issued the Naval General Service Medal with clasp "2 Aug. Boat Service 1811" to the surviving claimants from this action.

=== Prize taking ===
On 10 March 1812, Princess Augusta was in company with HMS Acquilon, Raven, and Prospero at the capture of the American brig John.

On 9 April, Princess Augusta was in company with Leveret when they captured the Danish vessels Frau Catherina Elizabeth and Emanuel.

On 23 May 1813, Princess Augusta was in company with Calliope, Urgent, Drake and Hearty when they captured the Danish vessels Jonge Greenwoldt, Hoffnung 1 and 2, and another vessel, name unknown. (Note: The prize money for an ordinary seaman was 17s 9d.)

On 10 July, Princess Augusta was part of a squadron that captured eight small vessels in the Elbe and Weser. The squadron included Desiree, under Captain Arthur Farquhar, who was the overall commander, Calliope, Brev Drageren, Shamrock, Thrasher and gunboats. (Note: The prize money for an ordinary seaman for the eight small vessels was 15s 9 3/4d.) On 3 August Princess Augusta captured five small vessels called evers.

On 3 August 1813 Princess Augusta and Redbreast captured five small vessels called "ewers". (Note: A first-class share of the prize money for ewers No. 54, 125, 119, 85, and 132 was worth £21 5s 5 1/2d; a sixth–class share was worth £1 7s 6d.)

On 5 January 1814 Princess Augusta was part of Farquhar's squadron, comprising Desiree, Hearty, Blazer, Piercer, Shamrock, Redbreast, and eight gun-boats, at the capitulation of the town and fortress of Gluckstadt during the War of the Sixth Coalition. On 15 July 1816 there was a first payment of £5000 in prize money to the navy. (Note: The share of an ordinary seaman was £2 14s 8d.)

== Disposal ==
Princess Augusta spent the remainder of her service with the Royal Navy apparently cruising uneventfully, in that there is no record of any actions, and escorting convoys. In May 1814, near the end of the Napoleonic Wars, the Admiralty returned her to her owners.
