= Battle of Saltholm =

1808 battle of the Gunboat War

- Part of the Gunboat War
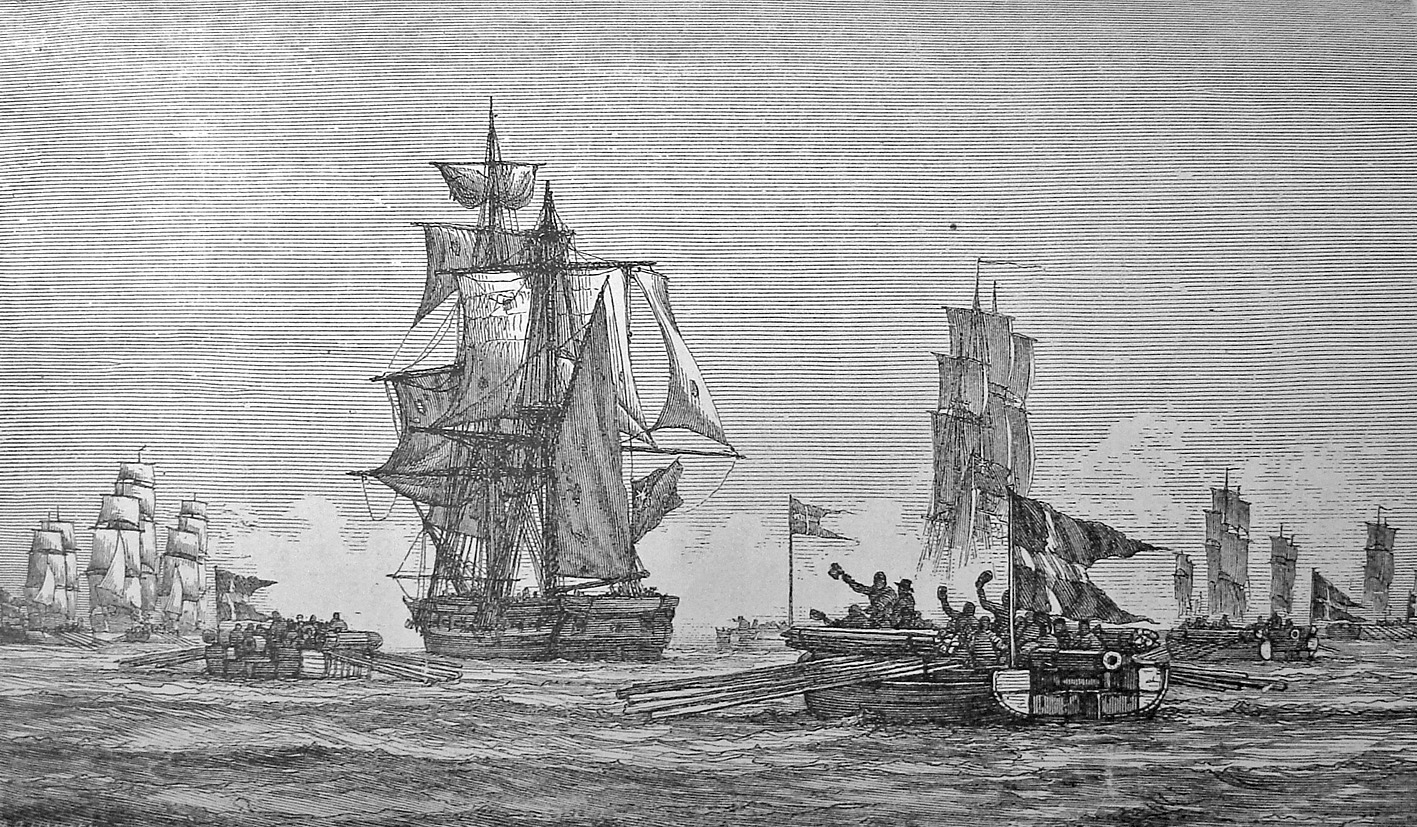
- Illustration of the battle
Date	9 June 1808
Location	Off Saltholm, Øresund
Result	Dano-Norwegian victory

Belligerents
Denmark-Norway	United Kingdom

Commanders and leaders
Johan Krieger	George Wood (surrendered)

Strength
21 gunboats 7 mortar boats	3 brig-sloops 1 bomb ketch 70 merchant ships

Casualties and losses
Unknown	1 brig-sloop captured 12-13 merchant ships captured

The Battle of Saltholm was fought on 9 June 1808 during the Gunboat War. Danish and Norwegian ships attacked a British convoy off the island of Saltholm in Øresund Strait near Copenhagen. (Note: Danish sources place the battle in Flinterenden, the channel between the island of Saltholm and Malmö.) A convoy of 70 British merchant vessels left Malmö under the escort of three Royal Navy brigs and one bomb vessel. The brigs were HMS Turbulent of 12 guns, the 14-gun Piercer and the 12-gun HMS Charger. The bomb was HMS Thunder. The Danes and the Norwegian assembled twenty-one gunboats and seven mortar boats for the attack. Once the Dano-Norwegian force attacked, the battle was over within twenty minutes.

Turbulent, under the command of Lieutenant George Wood, was bringing up the rear. She and Thunder engaged while the remaining ships attempted to flee. This proved difficult as the wind was very calm, which allowed the Danish and Norwegians to row up to and board several of the British merchantmen. Turbulent was finally dismasted, which forced her to strike. Still, her resistance enabled most of the merchant fleet to escape. The Dano-Norwegian force captured 12 or 13 merchant vessels, plus Turbulent. Thunder escaped with some damage.

The subsequent court-martial of Wood for the loss of his ship acquitted him of all charges. Although the Danish gunboats were active, this convoy was the only one to suffer a large loss. Still, the loss of the 12 ships led northern English merchants to publish a public protest against the Royal Navy in Kingston upon Hull.
