= John Marshall (Royal Navy officer, born 1785) =

Royal Navy officer

Sir John Marshall CB KCH KSG KSS
- Born: 1785
- Died: 30 September 1850, aged 64; Pendyffryn, Conwy
- Military career
- Allegiance: United Kingdom
- Branch: Royal Navy
- Rank: Rear Admiral
- Commands: HMS Shamrock; Milford Haven lazarettos Stangate Creek quarantine site HMS Isis
- Conflicts: French Revolutionary Wars; Napoleonic Wars; Raid on Batavia; Walcheren Expedition; Siege of Riga; War of 1812; Capture of HMS Java (POW)
- Awards: Knight Bachelor

Rear-Admiral Sir John Marshall CB KCH KSG KSS (1785 – 30 September 1850) was a Royal Navy officer. Having joined the navy in 1800, he fought at the raid on Batavia as a lieutenant in 1806 and was promoted to commander in 1812 while serving at the siege of Riga. He was given a command on the East Indies Station and took passage there on HMS Java. Java was captured by USS Constitution in December and Marshall was unable to assume command. Subsequently released in a prisoner exchange, he was instead given command of HMS Shamrock in 1813. In December he was given command of a squadron of gunboats in the North Sea to assist in the attack and capture of Glückstadt, which was completed on 5 January.

For his services in the North Sea Marshall was knighted by Russia and Sweden, made a Companion of the Order of the Bath, and promoted to post-captain. He did not receive another command at this point, and served on shore first as commander of lazarettos at Milford Haven and then the ship quarantine site at Stangate Creek. In 1832 he was made a Knight Bachelor and appointed a Knight Commander of the Royal Guelphic Order. Marshall received his second sea command of HMS Isis in 1841. He served in her on the Cape of Good Hope Station until 1845 and did not go to sea again. In March 1850 he was promoted to rear-admiral, but six months later he was badly injured in a fall from his carriage, dying on 30 September.

== Naval career ==
=== Early career ===
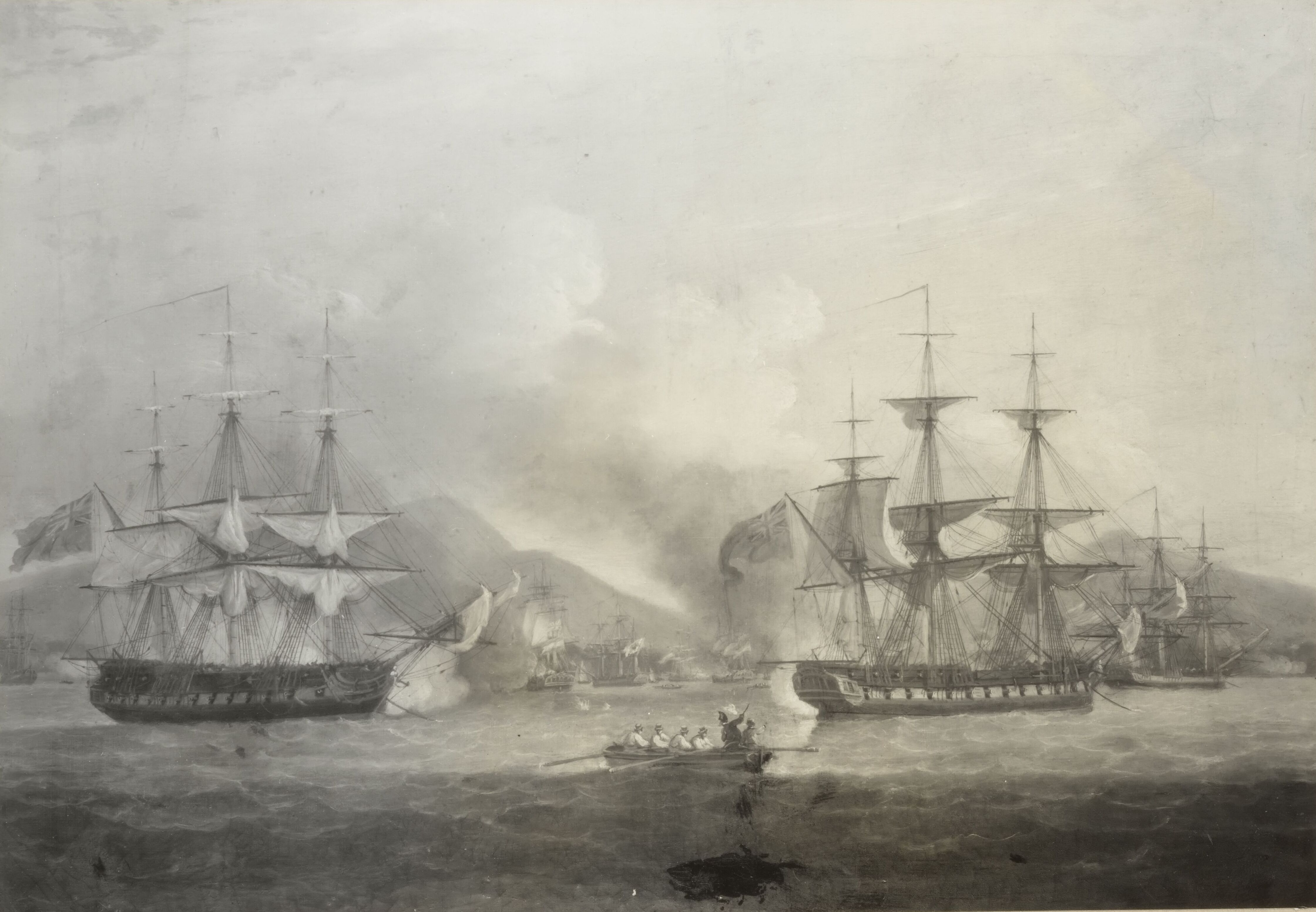
The British raid on Batavia on 27 November 1806

John Marshall was born in 1785. He joined the Royal Navy on 13 February 1800 as a first-class volunteer, a position held by young boys aspiring to become midshipmen. His first service was on board the 28-gun frigate HMS Aurora, commanded by Captain Thomas Gordon Caulfield. In March of the same year he was promoted to midshipman, and in Aurora he saw service on the Lisbon Station and in the Mediterranean Fleet. He left the ship in March 1802 when the Peace of Amiens came into effect, and instead joined the 38-gun frigate HMS Latona. In Latona he served in the English Channel and in the Baltic Sea through the Peace; in April 1803, just before the Peace ended, he re-joined Caulfield in a new command of his, the 50-gun fourth-rate HMS Grampus. Grampus was initially stationed in the Channel Islands off Guernsey, but was sent to serve on the East Indies Station on 29 June. In December 1805, still in the East Indies, Marshall followed Caulfield into the 74-gun ship of the line HMS Russell and at the same time was promoted to master's mate. In October 1806 the Commander-in-Chief, Rear-Admiral Sir Edward Pellew, had Marshall transferred to his flagship, the 74-gun ship of the line HMS Culloden, as an acting lieutenant. (Note: Syrett and DiNardo report that Marshall was in fact already a lieutenant by this point, having been promoted on 17 March 1806.)

Marshall sailed with Culloden for Batavia to search for the Dutch squadron supposedly based there; on 27 November he participated in the Raid on Batavia where Pellew's squadron destroyed a frigate and a large number of smaller warships and merchantmen in the harbour. At the beginning of 1807 he returned to Russell to serve as one of her lieutenants, with the ship becoming flagship to the new Commander-in-Chief, Rear-Admiral William O'Bryen Drury, in 1809. In February of that year Marshall fell ill and went home so that he could recuperate. By October he had recovered from his malady and on 24 October was appointed to serve on the 74-gun ship of the line HMS Aboukir, which was participating in the Walcheren Expedition and continued to do so until its end in December.

Aboukir subsequently joined the Baltic squadron of Rear-Admiral Thomas Byam Martin that was tasked with supporting Russia against Napoleon's invasion of 1812. The squadron was integral to the defence against the Siege of Riga from July of that year, where Aboukir served as Martin's flagship. For part of the operations at Riga Marshall was given command of a gunboat to assist in bombarding the attacking French forces; the siege was lifted in December, but by this time Marshall had already left it, having been promoted to commander on 24 October and given command of the 16-gun brig-sloop HMS Procris in the East Indies.

=== Command ===
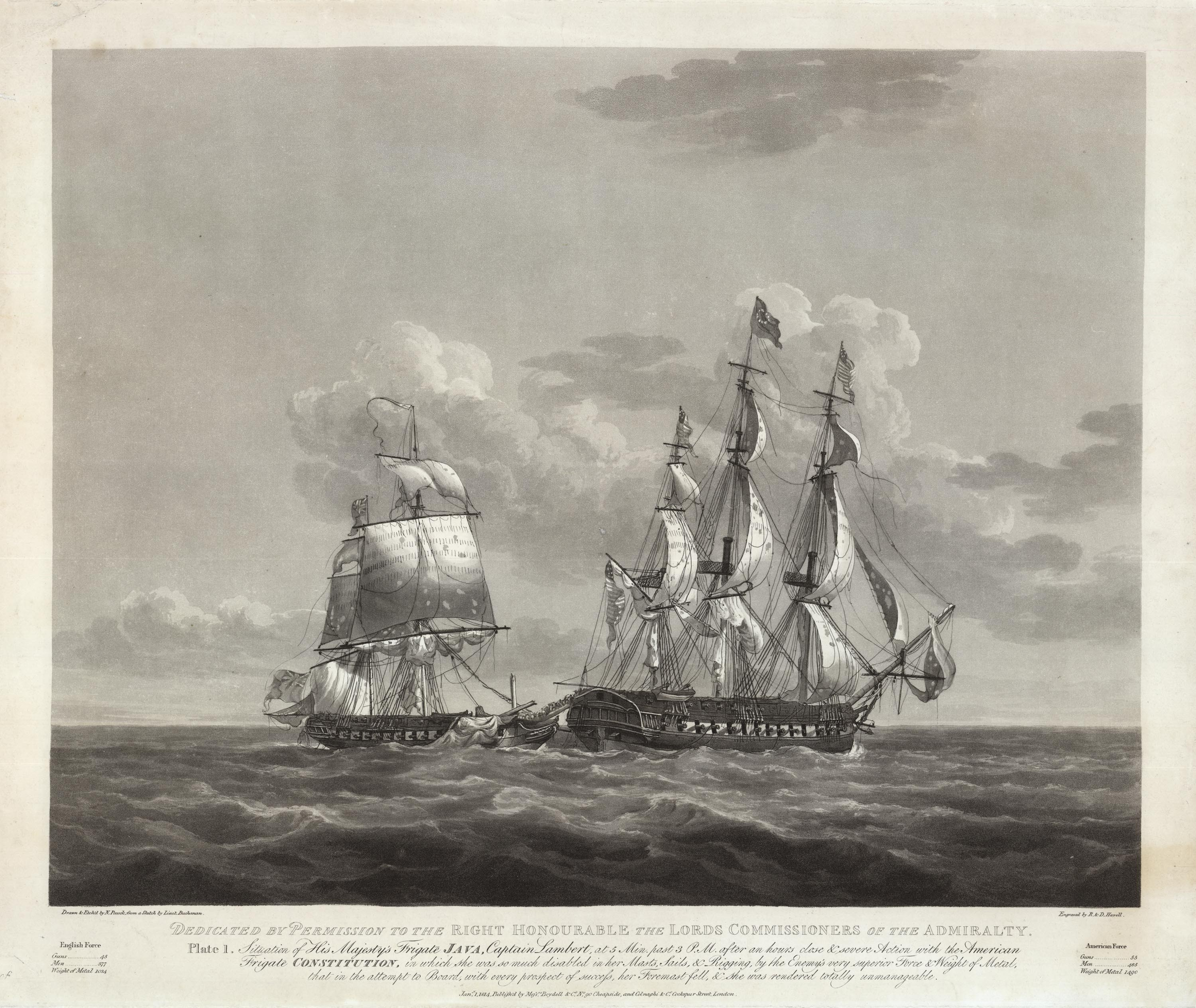
Java is captured by Constitution

To travel to his new command Marshall took passage on board the 46-gun frigate HMS Java. On 29 December Java encountered and was captured by the American 55-gun frigate USS Constitution after a battle of almost four hours. Marshall survived the battle and was detained with the rest of Java's crew. The senior surviving officer Lieutenant Henry Ducie Chads reported that despite being a passenger Marshall had provided support and advice throughout the battle and was slightly injured. The Java survivors were sent home in a prisoner exchange from Brazil and a court martial investigating the loss of the frigate was held on 23 April 1813. Not being examined himself, Marshall provided testimonies that helped acquit the crew. Having lost command of Procris because of his captivity, Marshall was given command of the 10-gun gun-brig HMS Shamrock, which he joined off Cuxhaven in the North Sea, on 11 November. Marshall was given command of a squadron of gun boats, with which he sailed up the Elbe to Glückstadt, where he was to support the advance of a Swedish force towards the town.

After helping the bombardment of Glückstadt, Marshall and his squadron attacked the fortress guarding the town on 26 December. The action continued through the morning of 28 December when it was called off, the enemy fortifications not having been heavily damaged by the attack. The British enhanced their batteries with more cannon and launched another attack in cooperation with their Swedish allies from land and sea on 1 January, but this was also repulsed. Glückstadt was subsequently captured on 5 January 1814 after a day of negotiations with the town's governor. Marshall received the thanks of Captain Arthur Farquhar, the over-all commander of the naval operations, for his services in the drawn out assault.

On 9 January, having found much difficulty in navigating his ship through the ice surrounding the town, Marshall brought his force into the harbour where he captured a Danish flotilla consisting of a brig and seven gunboats that had been holed up there. Marshall was then sent by Farquhar to Kiel to deal with the seized ships. He went on in Shamrock to provide assistance to the blockades of Hamburg and Haarburg with six of the gunboats captured at Glückstadt. In reward for his services he was promoted to post-captain on 7 June. At the start of 1815 he was rewarded by the governments of Russia and Sweden and created a Knight of the Order of St. George and Knight of the Order of the Sword respectively. On 4 June of the same year he was made a Companion of the Order of the Bath.

=== Later service ===
Having left Shamrock upon his promotion and the Napoleonic Wars having ended, Marshall did not immediately receive another command. He stayed on half pay until January 1826 when he was appointed Superintendent of Lazarettos at Milford Haven. Under his command were nine lazarettos, including HMS Ville de Paris, and the hospital ship HMS Otter, and he delegated control of the vessels to five lieutenants. (Note: Other lazarettos in use at the time included HMS Akbar, HMS Santa Margarita, and HMS Hannibal.) In January 1827 he was translated to Superintendent of the Stangate Creek quarantine site for ships. He was further rewarded in June 1832 when he was made a Knight Commander of the Royal Guelphic Order and a Knight Bachelor.

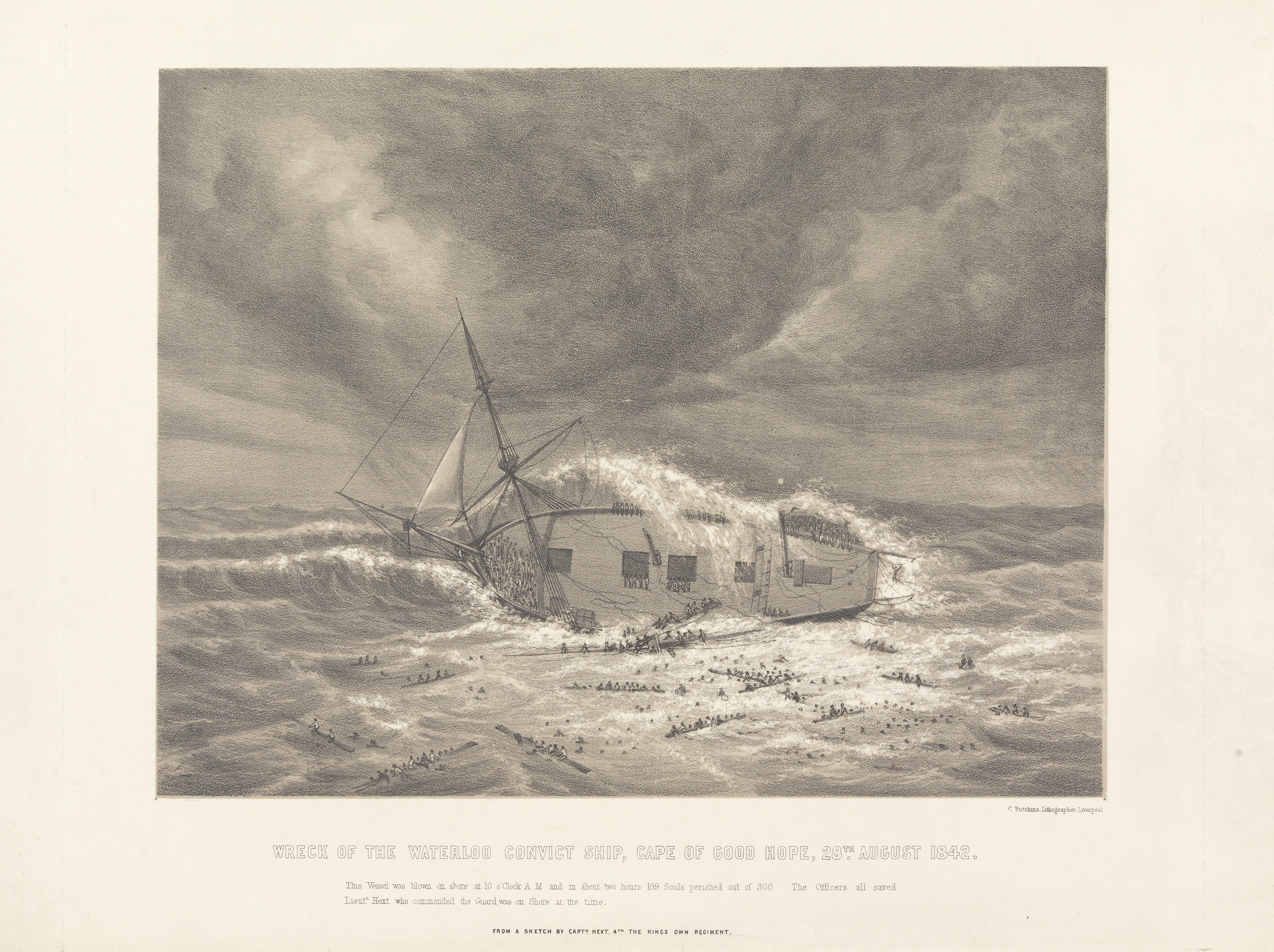
The loss of the convict ship Waterloo

After over twenty-five years on land, Marshall was finally given a command at sea again on 18 August 1841, when he was sent to join the 44-gun frigate HMS Isis. He sailed Isis to the Cape of Good Hope Station where Marshall protected trade and merchant ships with his squadron, with special interest paid to the trade routes going to Ichaboe Island. On 31 August 1842 Vice-Admiral Sir Edward Durnford King appointed Marshall to lead a board of inquiry into the loss of the convict ship Waterloo. She had been wrecked in Table Bay on 28 August with the loss of 188 lives. He completed his report on 10 September, criticising Waterloo's captain for choosing to anchor in Table Bay in bad weather and for doing little to assist in the rescue of the convicts onboard. In June 1843 Marshall was stationed at Cape Agulhas, having previously been at Mauritius for some time. For his services at the Cape of Good Hope he was thanked by the Committee at Lloyd's in April 1845, having returned home to pay off Isis at the start of the year.

== Retirement and death ==
On 27 March 1850 Marshall was promoted to rear-admiral. (Note: Full rank was rear-admiral of the blue.) He lived by this time at Pen-y-Garthen, in Denbighshire, Wales. Some time after his promotion, Marshall was badly injured in a fall from his gig and was taken to the house of Major-General Sir Charles Smith at Pendyffryn near Conwy. He died there on 30 September at the age of 64. At the time of his death he was receiving one of the Royal Navy's good service pensions for officers.

== Family ==
Marshall married Augusta Eliza Wynne, the daughter of John Wynne of Denbigh and granddaughter of Samuel Parr, on 17 September 1828. Together they had three daughters:

- Frances Orris Marshall, married Martin Hadsley Gosselin, the son of Admiral Thomas Le Marchant Gosselin
- Louisa Phillips Marshall, married Captain George Black of the Royal Canadian Rifles
- Mary Marshall, married George Middleton, the son of Rear-Admiral Robert Gambier Middleton
