= James Sibbald (1803 ship) =

History

United Kingdom
- Name: James Sibbald
- Owner: EIC voyages 1–4: George Gooch; 1817:John Blanshard
- Builder: Bombay Dockyard
- Launched: 30 November 1803
- Fate: Wrecked 1832

General characteristics
- Tons burthen: 640, or 647, or 667, or 66756/94, or 676 bm. (bm)
- Length: Overall:135 ft 1 in (41.2 m); Keel:109 ft 7 in (33.4 m)
- Beam: 33 ft 4 in (10.2 m)
- Depth of hold: 16 ft 6 in (5.0 m)
- Complement: 60
- Armament: 4 × 9-pounder guns + 10 × 18-pounder carronades

James Sibbald was launched at Bombay in 1803. She was a "country ship", a British vessel that traded only east of the Cape of Good Hope (the Cape). A French privateer captured her in late 1804, but she quickly returned to British ownership in Bombay in a process that is currently obscure. She made several voyages for the British East India Company (EIC).

== Career ==
On 12 November 1804, Captain Thomas Henry (or Henri), of Henriette, captured James Sybald, of ten guns and 1,000 tons (bm); James Sybald was carrying 16,000 bags of rice. (James Sibald had been sailing from Bengal to Bombay.) Henriette then returned to Port Louis on 10 December. James Sybald was armed with ten guns. She resisted and during the course of this resistance Captain Henri received a wound from a "biscaïen", a type of large-caliber musket. The wound exposed his entrails.

HMS Protector, Lieutenant Lord George Mouat Keith, participated in the capture of the Dutch Cape Colony in January 1806. At some point Protector captured a Dutch East Indiaman off the Cape that turned out to be James Sibbald. The Indiaman was carrying a cargo of cochineal, ivory, indigo, etc. reportedly worth £300,000. Keith took her back to England. (Note: There are reasons to question this report. A biographical entry for Keith makes no mention of the recapture, something that so notable a recapture would have warranted. Bulley, in her history of the country ships, makes no mention of the recapture. She does report that Thomas Basden had been master of James Sibbald in 1805–1806, and that Alexander Adamson owned her from 1805 to 1807. Lastly, Protector had sailed to Bombay prior to 12 March 1806, and only later returned to England. All this suggests that Adamson may have purchased James Sibbald in 1805, from her captors, or some other party that had purchased her from her captors.)

1st EIC voyage (1810): Captain George Harrower sailed from Bombay on 18 June 1810. James Sibbald reached St Helena on 8 September, and arrived at the Downs on 9 November.

2nd EIC voyage (1811–1812): Captain John Blanshard acquired a letter of marque on 22 March 1811. He sailed from Portsmouth on 25 April 1811, bound for Madras and Bengal. James Sibbald reached Madeira on 30 June, and Madras on 26 September; she arrived at Calcutta on 17 November. Homeward bound, she was at Saugor on 9 January, reached St Helena on 12 May, and arrived at the Downs on 23 June.

James Sibbald was admitted to the registries of Great Britain on 17 February 1813.

3rd EIC voyage (1813–1814): Captain Blanshard sailed from Portsmouth on 2 June 1813, bound for Bombay. James Sibbald reached Madeira on 21 June, and arrived at Bombay on 21 October. Homeward bound, she was at Point de Galle on 12 January 1814, reached St Helena on 1 March, and arrived at the Downs on 31 May.

4th EIC voyage (1815–1816): Captain James Keith Forbes sailed from the Downs on 22 May 1815, bound for Bengal. James Sibbald reached Madeira on 10 June, and arrived at Diamond Harbour on 3 November. Homeward bound, she was at Sagar on 29 January 1816. She reached Batavia on 11 March. From Batavia she visited Ambonya on 2 May, and Banda on 23 May, before returning to Ambonya on 24 June. She reached St Helena on 3 October, and arrived back at the Downs on 11 December.

In 1817 George Gooch sold James Sibbald to Captain John Blanshard, who renamed her Doris. Doris soon reverted to her original name.

Year	Master	Owner	Trade	Source
1818	Forbes	Gooch	London–India	LR

On 22 March 1818, James Sibbald, J.K.Forbes, master, sailed for Bombay under a licence from the EIC.

5th EIC voyage (1820–1821): Captain James Keith Forbes sailed from Falmouth on 22 January 1820, bound for Bengal. James Sibbald arrived at Calcutta on 5 November. Homeward bound, she was at Saugor on 18 February 1821, reached the Cape on 10 May, and St Helena on 4 June. She arrived at the Downs on 9 August.

6th EIC voyage (1825): Captain Forbes sailed from the Downs on 1 June 1825, bound for Bombay, which she reached on 1 October.

7th EIC voyage (1826–1827): Captain Forbes sailed from the Downs on 24 June 1826, bound for Madras and Bengal. She was conveying troops and after she reached Madras on 26 November, she carried them to Penang, where she arrived on 25 January 1825, and Penang, where she arrived on 12 February. She arrived at Colvin's Ghat (Calcutta) on 1 April

8th EIC voyage (1828–1829): Captain Richard Cole sailed from the Downs on 3 July 1828. James Sibbald conveyed troops to the Cape, Ceylon, and Bengal. She reached Colombo on 10 November, and arrived at Calcutta on 12 January 1829.

James Sibbald, Cole, master, sailed from Calcutta on 26 February 1829, with the headquarters and other troops of the 47th Regiment of Foot. She sailed via Mauritius and the Cape, and brought the troops to Chatham.

On 10 September 1832, James Sibbald left the Cape, bound for Bengal. Among her passengers were the Bishop of Calcutta and several missionaries. They arrived in Bengal on 4 November.

== Fate ==
On 29 December 1832, James Sibbald, William Darby, master was sailing from Bengal when she was lost on Point Gordewain at the entrance of Coringa Bay. The crew and passengers were saved and taken to Masulipatam. Her cargo, which was valued at £60,000, consisted primarily of 350 tons of sugar for the EIC, and 1500 chests of indigo.

On 15 January 1833, James Sibbald's hull was sold for breaking up. Her registration was cancelled on 28 December 1833, demolition having been completed.

Charles Eaton, Captain Fowle, master, arrived in London with 1000 chests of indigo worth about £45,000. On 14 June 1833, Lloyd’s Shipping List reported, "The cargo saved from the James Sibbald, built in Bombay, and wrecked on reefs off Coringa in 1832, has been reshipped per Charles Eaton." William Darby, the late master of James Sibbald was a passenger on Charles Eaton.
