= HMS Ems =

History

United Kingdom
- Name: HMS Ems
- Acquired: 1809 by capture
- Fate: Sold 1815

General characteristics
- Type: Schuyt
- Tons burthen: c.100 bm or 46 bm
- Propulsion: Sails
- Armament: 6 guns

HMS Ems was a Dutch schuyt that the Royal Navy captured in 1809. She was the only vessel of her name to serve in the Royal Navy. No vessel by that name appears in Colledge & Barlow (2006).

Ems appears to have had a completely uneventful career; in 1812 and 1813 she was at Yarmouth. She was converted to a water carrier, probably in 1813. In December 1815 the Admiralty put three schuyts, Patriot, Jahde, and Ems up for sale at Chatham. All sold in 1815.
