= HMS Redbreast (1805) =

Royal Navy brig

History

United Kingdom
- Name: HMS Redbreast
- Ordered: June 1804
- Builder: John Preston, Great Yarmouth
- Laid down: September 1804
- Launched: 27 April 1805
- Honours and awards: Naval General Service Medal (NGSM), with clasps; "2 Aug. Boat Service 1811"; "Glückstadt 5 Jany. 1814"
- Fate: 1815 transferred to Customs

United Kingdom
- Name: HMC Redbreast
- In service: 1815
- Out of service: 1830
- Fate: Sold 1850

General characteristics
- Class & type: Archer-class brig
- Tons burthen: 1803/94 (bm)
- Length: Overall:80 ft 0 in (24.4 m); Keel:65 ft 9 3/4 in (20.1 m)
- Beam: 22 ft 6 3/4 in (6.9 m)
- Depth of hold: 9 ft 5 in (2.9 m)
- Sail plan: Brig
- Crew: 50
- Armament: 10 × 18-pounder carronades + 2 × 12-pounder chase guns

HMS Redbreast was an Archer-class brig of the British Royal Navy. She captured some small merchant vessels and privateers. She also participated in two actions that would in 1847 earn her surviving crew members clasps to the Naval General service Medal (NGSM). The Navy transferred in 1816 to His Majesty's Customs. She was finally sold in 1850.

== Napoleonic wars ==
Redbreast was commissioned by Lieutenant John Maxwell in May 1805, for the Channel. He was promoted to Commander on 22 January 1806. His replacement was Lieutenant John Bayby Harrison.Redbreast was on the Portuguese coast in July 1807.

On 19 March 1808, Sir George Mouat Keith was appointed to Redbreast on the North Sea station.

Redbreast operated in the Channel until 1808, when she took part in the Baltic expedition. Detachments from the frigate Alexandria, the sloop Rosamond, and Redbreast manned two gunboats on 9 and 11 August 1808 on the Jade and Weser rivers. There they first captured a Danish privateer Mosin; four days later they captured Dutch gunboat No.106. Mosin was armed with one 4-pounder gun and had a crew of 11 men. The gunboat was armed with one 18-pounder and two 4-pounder guns. It had a crew of 23 men under the command of Lieutenant Henry Meyer. Neither side suffered any casualties. (Note: A prize money notice gave the name of the privateer as Captain Mossin. An able seaman's share of the prize money was worth £1 10s 2¼d.)

On 16 May 1809 Redbreat captured Anna Sophia, Griffstadt, and Wannerne; on 24 July she captured Twee Gesisters.

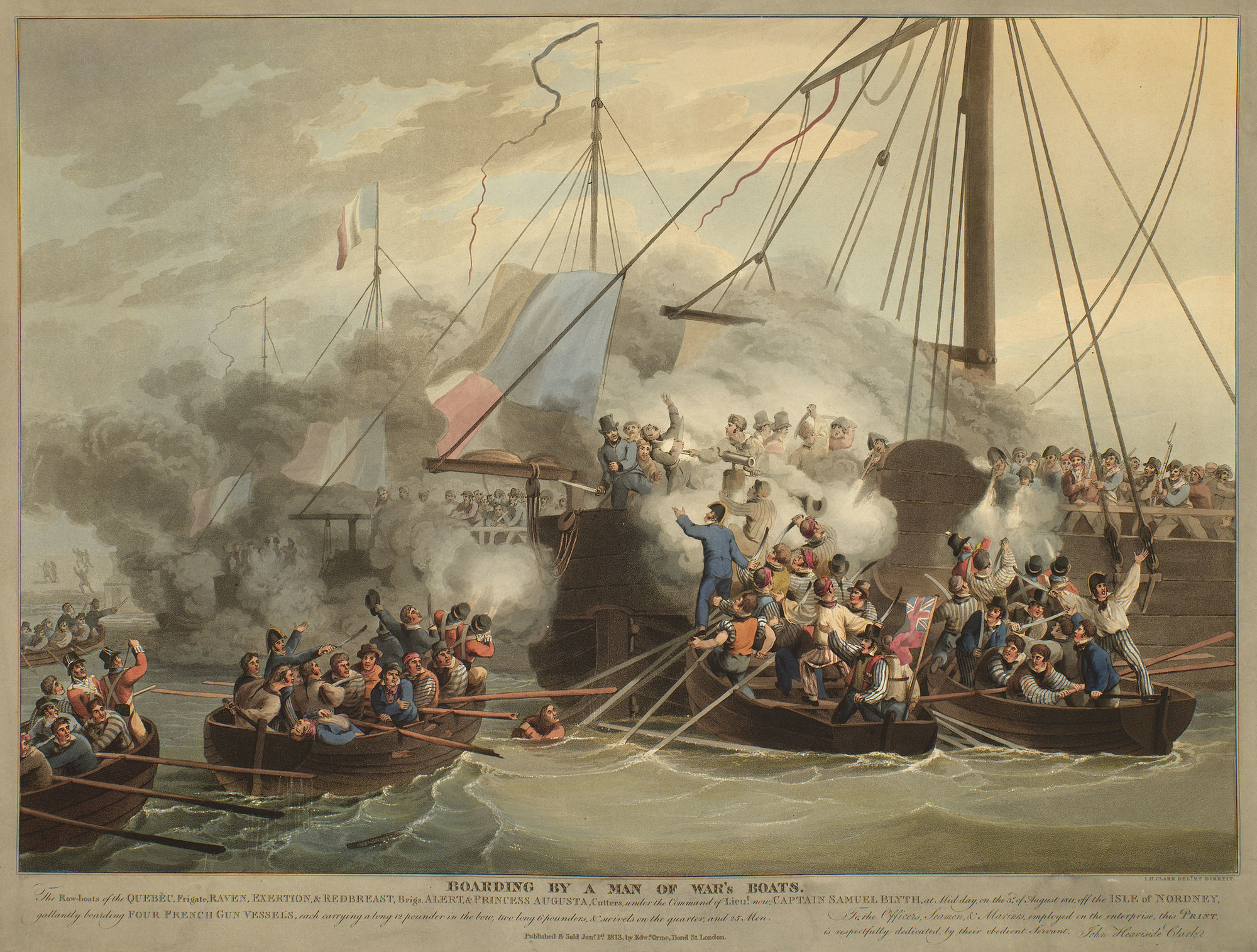
Boats from Redbreast boarding the French gun vessels at Norderney, 3 August 1811

In 1811 Redbreast was involved in a skirmish in the Jahde. On 1 August, a squadron, consisting of the 32-gun frigate Quebec, 16-gun brig Raven, the gun-brigs Exertion and Redbreast, and hired cutters Alert and Princess Augusta, were cruising off Texel. Quebec captured a Vaisseau de Guerre of the Imperial Customs Service, later named as a privateer Christine Charlotte. She had a crew of one officer and twelve men, one of whom was killed before she struck. She was leaving Nordeney (East Frisian Islands) with a merchant vessel in tow.

The sight of four enemy gun-brigs lying at anchor at Nordeney induced Captain Hawtayne of Quebec to despatch ten boats from the squadron, with 117 seamen and marines, to cut them out. The boats attacked, and after a hard fight captured French gunboats Nos. 22, 28, 31, 71. British casualties were four men killed (one from Redbreast), and 14 wounded; enemy casualties were two men killed and 12 wounded. (Note: The notice of the award of the clasp to the NGSM states that the boats captured three Danish gunboats. There were four. Furthermore, the names of the four commanders of the gunboats appear Dutch, and Hawatyne describes the armament as being of "Dutch metal", which "is much greater than the English", perhaps meaning that pounds were Dutch pounds, not English. The four gunboats were under the command of lieutenant de vaisseau Guillaume Wouters, of No.22. No. 22 had a crew of 25 men and was armed with one 12-pounder and two 6-pounder guns. No.28 was under the command of lieutenant de vaisseau Christian Smith. she had a cew of 24 men and was armed with one 12-pounder and two 8-pounder guns. No.31 was under the command of lieutenant de vaisseau Jan Dirk Schewe. She had a crew of 25 men and was armed with one 12-pounder and two 6-pounder guns. The fourth gunboat, No.71, was under the command of enseigne de vaisseau San Pieter Seiverda Munter. She had a crew of 25 men and was armed with one 12-pounder and two 6-pounder guns.) In 1847 the Admiralty awarded the NGSM to all surviving claimants from the action.

On 28 November 1811 Desiree, Captain Arthur Farquarh, arrived at Cuxhaven from Bremerlehe to join the squadron that Captain Greene, of Shamrock, had gathered. The British vessels had come to support the Russian troops under Colonel Alexander Radlinger, who were besieging the town. The squadron comprised Hearty, Blazer, Piercer, Shamrock, Redbreast, and the gun-boats Nos. 1, 2, 3, 4, 5, 6, and 10. The two key positions were the French forts Napoleon and Phare. While the gunboats fired on Phare, the British landed a number of guns and established a battery of six 18-pounders, two 32-pounders, and two 6-pounders. Before the battery could start firing on the 30th, the French surrendered both forts. The French surrendered 26 heavy guns, two 13" mortars, and a blockhouse with a garrison of three hundred men and officers, all of whom became prisoners of war. Redbreast carried the news back to England, together with the officers captured at Phare.

On 8 July 1812 Exertion hit a shifting sandbank unknown to her pilots. The next day, as enemy gunboats approached, the decision was taken to abandon her. Redbreast removed Exertion's crew and then set fire to her to prevent Exertion falling into enemy hands.

Redbreast and Thrasher were in company on 1 November 1812 at the capture of Mercurius, Pusche, master. Mercurius arrived at Yarmouth on 11 November.

Redbreast captured a Danish vessel Manly and her cargo in March 1813. This may have been the former HMS Manly, which the Danes had captured in 1811, though the prize money notice does not make the connection.

On 3 August 1813 Redbreast and Princess Augusta captured five small vessels called "ewers". (Note: A first-class share of the prize money for ewers No.54, 125, 119, 85, and 132 was worth £21 5s 5½d; a sixth–class share was worth £1 7s 6d.)

In August 1813 Redbreast was in company with Brev Drageren when they captured the Danish droits Haabet and Evers, No. 73 and 123, on the 13th and 14th. (Note: The captains received £17 13s 2d each; ordinary seamen received 7s 2½d each.)

From late December 1813 the squadron, comprising Desiree, Hearty, Blazer, Piercer, Shamrock, Redbreast, and eight gun-boats (the seven from Cuxhaven plus No. 12), supported Swedish forces under the command of General Baron de Boye against the Danes in the attack on the town and fortress of Glückstadt at the Elbe river during the War of the Sixth Coalition. The British arrived on 23 December and by 25 December had erected a battery of two 32-pounder guns. (They had landed six but the poor quality of the roads meant that only two were in place.) To support the bombardment on the next day, Farquhar sent in the gunboats and the brigs, whose armament he had reinforced with two 18-pounders each from Desiree. The bombardment continued to the 28th. Glückstadt having failed to surrender, Farquhar established three more batteries, one of two 18-pounders, one of four 32-pounders, and one of the two 13" mortars captured at Cuxhaven. An English rocket brigade under Lieutenant Amherst Wright contributed to the bombardment. These batteries commenced bombarding the town on 1 January 1814, keeping it up for the next two days. On 4 January Farquhar sent in a flag of truce, and after negotiations, the governor surrendered on 5 January. British casualties overall were light. (Note: On 15 July 1816 there was a first payment of £5000 in prize money to the navy. The share of an ordinary seaman was £2 14s 8d.) In 1847 the Admiralty awarded the NGSM to all surviving claimants from the campaign.

In 1814 the Navy re-rated Redbreast as a sloop, so that Keith could continue to command her on his promotion on 16 March 1814 from lieutenant to commander.

== Post-war ==
Redbreast was in Ordinary at Portsmouth in 1815. She then was converted to a customs hulk, and in 1830 a lazaretto for the Quarantine Service at Liverpool.

== Fate ==
Redbreast was sold in Liverpool on 14 June 1850.
