= HMS Paz (1807) =

Spanish Naval Schooner

History

Spain
- Name: Paz
- Laid down: c.1804
- Captured: By the Royal Navy, February 1807

United Kingdom
- Name: HMS Paz
- Acquired: By capture, February 1807
- Fate: Sold, 1816

General characteristics (in Spanish service)
- Type: Schooner
- Armament: 10 guns

General characteristics (in British service)
- Type: Schooner
- Tons burthen: 141 (bm)
- Complement: 40
- Armament: 2 × long 6-pounder bow chasers + 10 × 12-pounder carronades

HMS Paz was a Spanish naval schooner that the British Royal Navy captured at Monte Video on 3 February 1807. She served on the River Plate, North Sea, and North American Stations, where she captured numerous privateers and merchant vessels. The Navy sold her in 1816.

== Capture ==
The time of her capture, the British described Paz as being "pierced for 10 Guns, about 3 Years old, Sails on Shore, is coppered, and pretty well found." In June Paz was on the River Plate in the squadron under Admiral George Murray supporting General John Whitelocke's soldiers in the operations to capture Buenos Aires.

== Service ==
HMS Paz was registered on 4 June 1808. However, she was already commissioned in February 1807 under Lieutenant George Mitchenor. In April, Lieutenant John Pierie replaced Mitchenor, still on the River plate station. Pierie had been a pressed man, an unusual background for an officer. He quarreled with his sailing master and froze him out of the running of the vessel. During Pierie's command, 14 of his 31 crewmen deserted. This may not have been entirely due to Pierie. When captains of four other vessels on the station were asked to provide crew to man Paz, they naturally sent over "the clumsy, the stupid, the violent, and the disobedient", and these men represented over half of her crew.

Paz sailed to the Cape of Good Hope. There Lieutenant Daniel Pring took command and sailed her to England. There she was refitted at Portsmouth between 24 April 1808 and 6 June 1808. In 1809 in the North Sea. Still under Pring's command, on 23 May 1809, Paz was in company when the gun-brig Exertion when they destroyed two Danish privateers, one was the Elsigneur and the other Sylt. Exertion, Paz, and Censor then captured the French privateer Fortune on 16 June. Paz destroyed the privateer Betsey on 20 July. (Note: A first-class share of the head money was worth £6 3s 6d; a sixth-class share was worth 5s 5¼d.)

Some three weeks later, on 10 August, Paz was in company with the gun-vessel (and ex-Dutch schuyt) Patriot at Hocksyl. There they captured the Danish privateer Blankanaise, a sloop laden with linen, a lugger in ballast, and sundry goods. (Note: A first-class share of the prize money was worth £46 17s 11½d; a sixth-class share, that of an ordinary seaman, was worth £3 8s 6d.) Two weeks later, Patriot, Paz, and the gun-vessels Censor and Jahde captured property at Harlinger Zyl, together with a Danish privateer and a mutt in ballast. The next month, on 11 September, Pincher, Patriot, Paz, and Jahde shared in the capture of vessels referred to in the prize-money announcement as Young Pincher, Young Paz, and Young Patriot. Then on 3 November Paz and Blazer detained Twee Gebroders and Jonge Jeltzie. (Note: A first-class share of the prize money was worth £55 12s 4d; a sixth-class share was worth £3 16s 4½d.)

On 26 December 1809, Blazer and Paz were serving independently blockading the river Ems when Blazer captured an American vessel that was attempting to breach the blockade. Paz sued to share in the proceeds on two grounds: first, that the two British vessels were engaged in a joint enterprise, and second, that Paz had been in sight at the time of the capture. The court ruled that Lord George Stuart, who commanded the station at Heligoland, had sent the two British vessels out with parallel, but not joint orders. It further ruled that there was no independent evidence that Paz had been in sight. The court therefore denied the claim. The case was nevertheless important in that it helped define the meaning of blockade.

Paz sailed for North America on 22 April 1811. Paz recaptured the schooner Martha, J. Darley, master, on 18 July. In September 1812 Paz arrived at Halifax with a convoy and Pring transferred to the flagship of Admiral Herbert Sawyer. Paz then came under the command of Lieutenant Perry Dumaresq.

On 4 December Paz captured the privateer schooner Revenge, of 69 tons and 27 men, under the command of John Sinclair, Jnr., master. Revenge was out of Salem and was carrying guns, ammunition and provisions for a cruise. Paz had captured Revenge, the former John and George (of three guns and 38 men, out of Salem), off the Jeddore Ledges. An American account reported that a sloop of six guns had set out from Nova Scotia with 100 volunteers on board to attempt to capture Revenge. A running fight of four hours ensued before the sloop gave up. Casualties on Revenge were one man killed and three wounded. The newspaper claimed that 40 to 50 men aboard the Nova Scotian vessel had been killed or wounded. The account reported that a three-masted schooner or lugger, of 17 guns, then came out and that it was that vessel that captured Revenge.

In Halifax, two successful privateers, Thomas Freeman and Snow Parker, bought Revenge at Halifax for £530 and renamed her Retaliation. She was armed with two 4-pounder guns and a long 12-pounder gun on a pivot; to these her new owners added two 12-pounder carronades. Retaliation went on to have a successful career preying on American shipping.

In March 1813, Paz was part of a squadron under the command of Admiral Sir John Poo Beresford in Poictiers, which was blockading the Delaware River. The squadron also included Belvidera and two sloops. On 16 March, Beresford sent a demand to Lewistown, for the Americans to provide his vessels with twenty live bullocks, in return for payment, or face bombardment. The governor of Delaware played for time as he moved in troops to resist a landing.

On 17 March Paz captured the 10-gun schooner Pennsylvania, out of Cape May, New Jersey. The Royal Navy kept Pennsylvania for use as a tender. On 11 April, Pennsylvania captured Pilgrim, which was sailing to Boston. The British took out her cargo and proceeded to use Pilgrim too as a tender. Paz was part of a squadron of 12 ships that shared in the capture on 13 and 14 March of Christina and Massatoit. (Note: A first-class share was worth £37 3d; a sixth-class share was worth 5s 5d.)

Dumaresq and Paz also captured Montesquieu, which occurred on 27 March 1813. She belonged to the Philadelphia banker Stephen Girard and was bringing a valuable cargo of tea, nankeen, silk, copper, and cassia (Chinese cinnamon - Cinnamomum cassia), from Canton. Dumaresq put the entire crew of Montesquieu and their baggage into the ship's pinnace, except for the ship's supercargo, Arthur Grelaud, and the ship's steward. The captain and crew arrived safely in Lewis Town that same day and the captain immediately sent a letter to Girard. Beresford arrived on the scene in Poictiers. Beresford took Montesquieu into the Delaware River and immediately entered into negotiations with Girard's agents instead of sending the vessel to be condemned at the Vice admiralty court in Halifax. Girard, with the authorization of the American authorities, paid 180,000 Spanish milled dollars ransom for his vessel, an amount that Grelaud had negotiated. Girard applied to the US authorities for permission to pay the ransom, which he received. (Girard's Bank was a principal source of government credit during the War of 1812.) Dumaresq, and his descendants, blamed Beresford for having deprived them of the prize. (Note: Newspapers had put the value of Montesquieu's cargo at $1.5 million. Girard stated that the value was $164,744.20. Girard was also unimpressed with the lack or resistance by John Wilson, the captain of Montesquieu, as Girard felt that his crew, though outnumbered, and his vessel, though somewhat outgunned, were still capable of having put up a fight.) Paz shared the ransom with Belvidera and Poictiers. (Note: A first-class share of the ransom was worth £1704 9s 5d; a sixth-class share was worth £7 14s 10d. For an ordinary seaman, the amount was worth about four to five months' pay. For a captain, the first-class share was worth more than four or five years' pay. This payment represented money reserved to answer Paz's claims before the Vice admiralty court at Halifax.)

This business having been completed around the end of March, on 6 and 7 April, the British squadron, including Paz, bombarded Lewes (Lewistown), the Americans having declined to deliver the bullocks that Beresford had requested. The British fired some 400 shot, but with little or no effect and no infliction of any casualties, and then withdrew.

Then on 10 May Paz captured the sloop Juliet, of 92 tons, which was sailing from Cuba to Newport, Rhode Island. Under her master, C. Southworth, Juliet was carrying 113 hogsheads and 19 tierces of molasses. Paz's war on commerce continued with the capture on 13 September of the schooner Richard D. Stanley, of 115 tons, sailing to Boston with a cargo of 506 barrels of tar, 170 of pitch, 69 of turpentine and 100 of flour. In October, Paz captured three vessels. The first, on 4 October, was the 95-ton sloop Charles, of Ocracocke, J. Cook, master, which was carrying 679 barrels of flour to St. Johns, New Brunswick. The second, on 14 October, was the schooner Randolph, W. Clarke, master. The third, on 27 October, was the schooner William, S. Nevis, master, which was carrying provisions from New York to Charlestown.

== Fate ==
Paz was paid off in October 1814. She was sold in 1816, but her name was not deleted from the Navy List until 7 February 1817.
