= HMS Prospero (1809) =

Naval brig (1809-1816)

History

United Kingdom
- Name: HMS Prospero
- Ordered: 23 March 1808
- Builder: Woolwich Dockyard (M/s Edward Sison)
- Laid down: August 1808
- Launched: 9 November 1809
- Fate: Sold 30 May 1816

General characteristics
- Class & type: Crocus-class brig-sloop
- Type: Brig-sloop
- Tons burthen: 25141/94 (bm)
- Length: Overall: 92 ft (28.0 m); Keel: 72 ft 8 3/4 in (22.2 m)
- Beam: 25 ft 6 in (7.8 m)
- Depth of hold: 12 ft 8 in (3.9 m)
- Sail plan: Brig rigged
- Complement: 86
- Armament: 2 × 6-pounder bow chasers; 12 × 24-pounder carronades
- Notes: Some of Prospero's floor timbers and futtocks were made from Holstein oak.

HMS Prospero was a 14-gun Crocus-class brig of the Royal Navy, launched in 1809. She captured a handful of small vessels, including one privateer. The Navy sold her in 1816 for breaking up.

== Career ==
Commander John Hardy Godby was appointed to command of Prospero on 18 November 1809. On 16 April 1810 she sailed with the Halifax convoy. Between 1811 and 1813 she served on the North Sea Station.

On 17 February 1811, Prospero destroyed a Danish privateer cutter, of two guns and 25 men, near Christiansand, on the coast of Norway. The Navy paid head money for the crew of the privateer in 1832. (Note: A first-class share, i.e., Godby's share, was worth £23 12s 4d; a sixth-class share, that of an ordinary seaman, was worth 11s 10d.)

On 10 March 1812 Prospero was in company with HMS Acquilon, Raven, and the Hired armed cutter Princess Augusta at the capture of the American brig John.

On 16 March Prospero was in company with Acquilon and Raven at the capture of the Danish vessel Sarah Christina.

HMS Cretan and Leveret were in company on 28 February 1813 at the capture of Emnenitts; Prospero shared by agreement.

Cretan and Leveret were in company on 12 (or 15) March 1813 and so shared in the proceeds of the capture of the Danish vessel Aurora. Two days later, Cretan and Raven captured Anna Brouer; Prospero shared by agreement. That same day Prospero captured Najaden; Cretan and Raven shared in the proceeds by agreement.

On 29 March Prospero captured Quatres Freres; Raven shared by agreement in the proceeds.

Commander Godby was promoted to post captain on 27 June 1814. Commander George Greensill re-commissioned Prospero in August.

== Fate ==
The "Principal Officers and Commissioners of His Majesty's Navy" offered Prospero for sale on 18 April 1816 at Woolwich. She finally sold on 30 May for £720 for breaking up.

== Notes, citations, & references ==
Notes

Citations

References

- Marshall, John (1829). "Godby, John Hardy" . Royal Naval Biography. Vol. sup, part 3. London: Longman and Company. p. 396.
- Winfield, Rif (2008). British Warships in the Age of Sail 1793–1817: Design, Construction, Careers and Fates (2nd ed.). Seaforth Publishing. ISBN 978-1-86176-246-7.
