= HMS Turbulent (1805) =

Brig of the Royal Navy

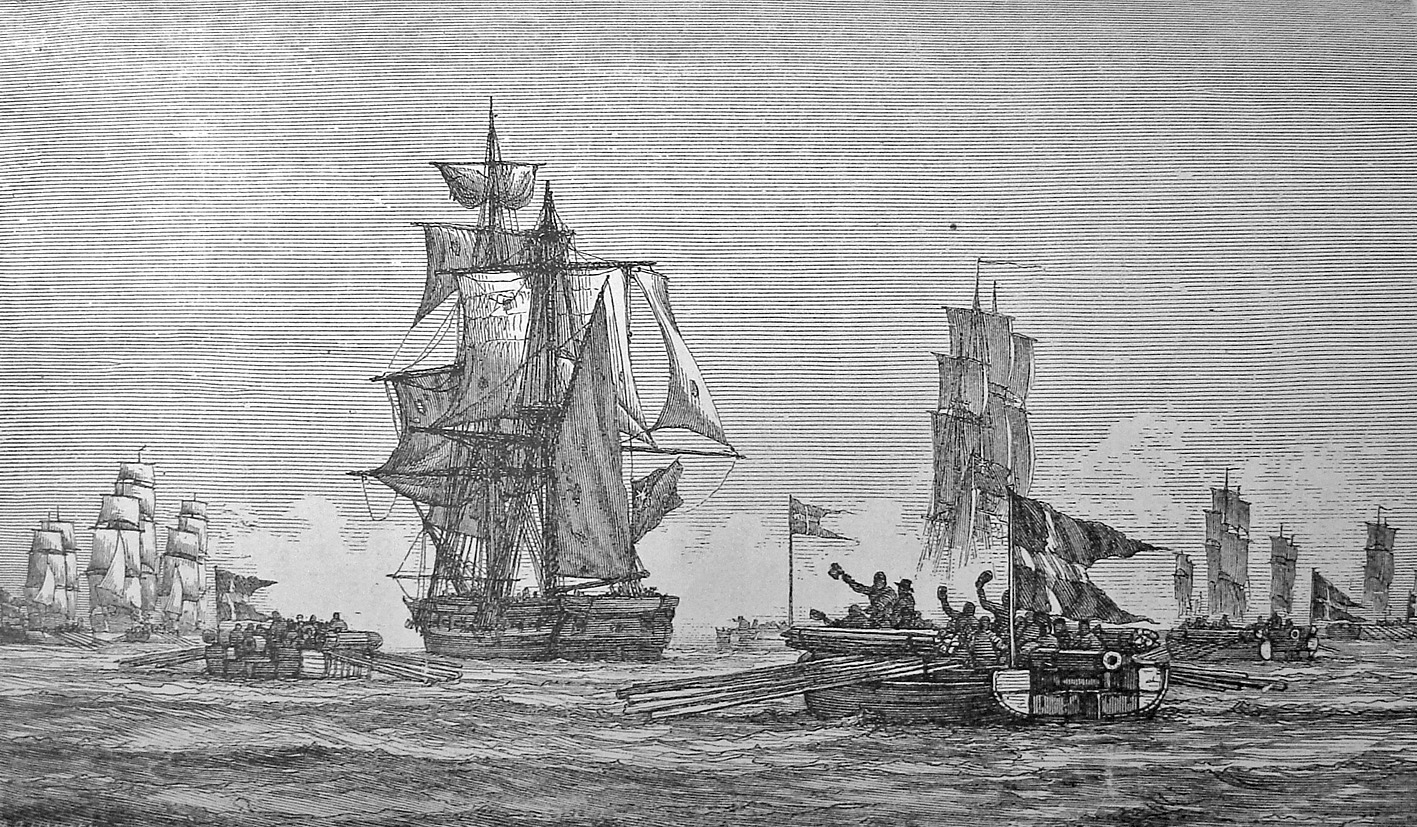
- Turbulent (centre) at the Battle of Saltholm

History

United Kingdom
- Name: HMS Turbulent
- Ordered: 20 November 1804
- Builder: Tanner, Dartmouth, Devon
- Laid down: February 1805
- Launched: 17 July 1805
- Fate: Captured, 9 June 1808

Denmark & Norway
- Name: HDMS The Turbulent
- Captured: 9 June 1808
- Fate: Sold 1814

General characteristics
- Tons burthen: 18124/94 (bm)
- Length: Overall::84 ft 2 1/2 in (25.7 m); Keel:69 ft 10 1/2 in (21.3 m)
- Beam: 22 ft 1 in (6.7 m)
- Draft: Unladen:6 ft 9 in (2.1 m); Laden:8 ft 0 in (2.4 m)
- Depth of hold: 11 ft 0 in (3.4 m)
- Complement: British service: 50; Danish service: 83
- Armament: British service: 10 × 18-pounder carronades + 2 × 12-pounder guns (bow and stern); Danish service: 10 × 18-pounder cannons + 2 × 9-pounder cannons + 2 × 8-pounder cannons

HMS Turbulent was a Confounder-class 12-gun gun-brig in the Royal Navy. She was the first ship to bear this name. Built at Dartmouth, Devon by Tanner, she was launched on 17 July 1805. The Danes captured her in 1808. She was sold in 1814.

== Service and capture ==
Turbulent was commissioned in September 1805 under Lieutenant Thomas Osmer for the Downs. On 14 September 1806 she was in company with Urgent when they captured the Romeo. They sent Romeo, Curran, master, into Dover. Romeo had been sailing from Virginia to Rotterdam.

In 1807 Lieutenant John Nops replaced Osmer. On 4 June 1807 Turbulent captured the American schooner Charles. Also in June, Turbulent detained and sent into The Downs the Mount Etna, of Boston, which had been sailing from to Amsterdam.

In early July Turbulent detained and sent into the Downs the Danish vessel Providence, Richelsen, master.

Then on 7 September Turbulent was among the vessels present at the seizure of the Danish fleet at Copenhagen.

In 1808 Lieutenant George Wood replaced Nops. Under Wood, Turbulent captured three vessels in mid-April: Vier Goschevestern (12 April), Emanuel (13 April) and Enigheden (14 April). On 28 April four Danish ketches, carrying wine and deals, prizes to Turbulent, arrived at Sheerness.

Turbulent had served for only three years in all before she bore the brunt of a Danish attack whilst on escort duty during the Gunboat War. On 9 June, Turbulent, under Lieutenant George Wood, was one of the escorts for a convoy of 70 merchantmen. (The others were the bomb-vessel Thunder, Captain James Caulfield, 12-gun gun-brig Charger, Lieutenant John Aitkin Blow, and 14-gun gun-brig Piercer, Lieutenant John Sibrell). In the late afternoon the convoy became becalmed off the Danish island of Saltholm, lying between Copenhagen and Malmo Bay.

In the Battle of Saltholm, a large force of 21 Danish gunboats and 7 mortar boats came out from Copenhagen to attack the convoy. Only Turbulent, which was bringing up the rear, and Thunder were in a position to resist and after 10 minutes of an exchange of fire, Turbulent had lost her main-top-mast and had had three men wounded. Turbulent's resistance saved most of the convoy but the Danes boarded and took her and also 12 merchantmen. Thunder was able to hold off her attackers and they retired with their prizes. The subsequent court martial honorably acquitted Lieutenant Wood for the loss of his ship.

Although the Danish gunboats were active, this convoy was the only one to suffer a large loss. Still, the loss of the 12 ships led the British north country merchants to publish a protest in Hull. The report in Lloyd's List suggested that the Danes captured well more than 12 merchantmen, once one includes Swedish vessels. The same report also mentioned the capture of Turbulent and Tickler, though actually the capture of Tickler by four Danish gunboats occurred five days earlier, on 4 June.

== Fate ==
The Danes took Turbulent into the Danish navy under the same name. She was sold out of service in 1814 to the broker Herlew, presumably after the Treaty of Kiel ended the War.

Lloyd's List reported in March 1816 that the Danish brig Turbulent, of Copenhagen, which had been sailing from St Croix, had been seen at Landskrona, surrounded by ice.
