= James Denning =

The Reverend James Denning (1814–1875) was an Anglican clergyman of Irish descent. He was educated at Trinity College Dublin, and was ordained as a deacon in June 1842. The 1881 Census shows him to be living at 3 Holywell Terrace, Shrewsbury, Shropshire.

== Family ==
He married Elizabeth Mary Ellerton (1824-1885) on 7 August 1845 in Kensington, London. His wife was the granddaughter of Sir George Mouat Keith, Baronet, and was born in at Keith's house in Camberwell, London.

They had seven sons and four daughters; those shown on the 1881 Census were: Elizabeth Ella Amelie Denning, Georgina Catherine Annie Denning, John Frederick Charles de Winton Denning, Folliott Vere de Winton Denning and Emma Margaret Isabella de Winton Denning.

According to The Times of Feb 11, 1856, Denning conducted the marriage ceremony at St. John's Church, Notting Hill, of his cousin John Ellerton Esq., youngest son of the late John Frederick Ellerton Esq., of the Bengal Civil Service, and grandson of the late George Mouat Keith, to Laura Elizabeth, youngest daughter of the late John Martin, Esq., M.D.

== Writings and opinions ==
Denning was scathing of the Welsh language: "Teach English and bigotry will be banished" and "I cannot too strongly express my opinion about the necessity of getting rid of the Welsh language".

The 1847 Reports of the Commissioners of Inquiry into the State of Education in Wales (commonly known in Wales as The Treason of the Blue Books) records "The Reverend James Denning, who gave evidence on ‘Morals’ to the Commissioners, asserted that ‘to all appearances they enjoy their filth and idleness’, a trait he equates as common between the ‘lower order of Welsh and Irish’, both of whom are ‘dirty, indolent, bigoted, and contented’, though the Welsh are also seen as given to activity where moral duplicity is concerned (‘double dealing’) and the women as having a proclivity for drinking ‘quantities of gin’."

Denning was not impressed with the standard of teachers in Brecon: "YES, there are four day-schools connected with the Church in the town of Brecon, and only one of the teachers of those schools was ever in a training establishment. I believe all the teachers are deficient in "order" and that the discipline of the schools is very defective. We want well-trained masters."

But he was kinder to the Welsh in certain respects, and harsh on his own profession: "The Welsh are warm-hearted and kind, and might be much improved in morals if their spiritual teachers were men of zeal and piety. But, alas! the large body of the clergy are drones, and the preachers fanatics."

== Shrewsbury Jail ==
On 8 April 1868 Denning was Chaplain at Shrewsbury Jail (also known as The Dana and The County Prison) and was present at the execution of one John Mapp, the 'Longden Murderer'. "During the last fortnight the Rev. J. Denning, the prison chaplain, was unremitting in his attendance upon the prisoner, and spared no pains to prepare him for his approaching end."

== Brecknockshire ==
In 1850 Denning was listed as a curate in Diocese of St Davids, Brecknockshire.

== Genealogy ==
In Reverend James Denning's immediate family tree the middle names "Vere", "ffolliott", "de Winton", "Glendenning" and "Glendening" appear frequently - no link to families of that name have been found to date. If information is available please contact the author.
