= HMS Jahde =

History

United Kingdom
- Name: HMS Jahde
- Namesake: Jade Bight
- Acquired: 1809 by capture
- Fate: Sold 1815

General characteristics
- Type: Schuyt
- Tons burthen: 47 bm
- Propulsion: Sails
- Armament: 6 guns

HMS Jahde was a Dutch schuyt of six guns and 47 tons burthen that the Royal Navy captured in 1809 and took into service. She was the only vessel of her name to serve in the Royal Navy. No vessel by that name appears in Colledge & Barlow (2006). She served until she was sold in 1815.

On 24 August 1809, Jahde was in company with Patriot, the schooner Paz, and two boats detached from Brev Drageren and Censor. Together they captured property at Harlinger Zyl, together with a Danish privateer and a mutt in ballast.

The next month, on 11 September, Pincher, Patriot, Paz and Jahde shared in the capture of vessels referred to in the prize-money announcement as Young Pincher, Young Paz, and Young Patriot.

Jahde was converted into a water vessel, perhaps in 1813 like Patriot. In December 1815 the Admiralty put three schuyts, Patriot, Ems, and Jahde up for sale at Chatham. All sold in 1815.
