= George Mouat Keith =

Royal Navy officer (1764–1832)

- Born: 1764
- Died: 1832 (aged 67–68); Mantes, France
- Military career
- Allegiance: United Kingdom
- Branch: Royal Navy
- Rank: Commander
- Commands: HMS Boxer; HMS Protector; HMS Redbreast
- Conflicts: Napoleonic Wars

George Mouat^{[a]} Keith (1764–1832) was an officer of the Royal Navy during the Napoleonic Wars. He was of Scottish descent.

== Family and early life ==
George Mouat-Keith was born in 1764, the son of John Mouat-Keith (1729–1788), and his wife Margaret, the daughter of William Chalmers (1695-1770), twice Provost of Aberdeen in 1738–1739 & 1746–1747.^{[b]} John Mouat-Keith claimed to be a baronet, and after his death, his son maintained the claim, using the style of a baronet. No evidence to support the claim to a baronetcy has been found however. The family traced its lineage back to Patrick Mowat of Loscragy, who received the charter of Loscragy and Culpedauchis from Robert the Bruce in 1309, and was thus the first laird of Balquholly.

A voyage to South America, and the Cape of Good Hope, in His Majesty's gun brig the Protector, commanded by Lieut. Sir G. M. Keith, bart

George Keith was commissioned as a lieutenant on 12 August 1801. He was in command of HMS Boxer from 27 September 1804 to 5 June 1805, taking command of HMS Protector and remained with her until 8 March 1806. Mouat-Keith was present at the capture of the Cape of Good Hope in 1806. While at the Cape, Mouat-Keith and Protector captured a Dutch East Indiaman (the former James Sibbald, and her cargo of cochineal, ivory, indigo, etc., supposedly worth £300,000.

== North Sea commands ==
In 1808 Mouat-Keith transferred to HMS Redbreast, another gun-brig, on the North Sea station. On 9 and 11 August 1808 Mouat-Keith was instrumental in rescuing 'the Spaniards' from the Danish privateer Mosin and two Danish Navy ships in the rivers Jahl and Weser, without casualties on either side. The captured privateer and Danish gunboat 206 were subsequently sold. On 16 May 1809 Redbreast was credited with the capture of Anna Sophia, Grisstadt and Wannerne, and on the following 24 July Twee Gesetsters, with those 'actually on board' being promised a bounty, according to Act of Parliament.

In 1811 Mouat-Keith was involved in a skirmish in the Jahde – "On the 1st of August, as a squadron, consisting of the 32-gun frigate Quebec, Captain Charles Sibthorpe Hawtayne, 16-gun brig Raven, Commander George Gustavus Lennock, gun-brigs Exertion and Redbreast, Lieutenants James Murray and Sir George M. Keith, baronet, and hired cutters Alert and Princess Augusta, were cruising off Texel, information of some Danish gun-brigs was received, which induced Captain Hawtayne to despatch ten boats from the squadron, under the command of Lieutenant Samuel Blyth, containing 117 seamen and marines, to cut them out." The squadron received intelligence from earlier captures of four Danish gun brigs lying at anchor at the island of Nordeney and Hawtayne sent in a cutting-out party of 10 boats. Each of the Danish vessels had a crew of 25 men.

In 1813 and 1814 Mouat-Keith took part on the sieges of Cuxhaven and Gluckstadt (then in the hands of the French). "To Lieutenants Kneeshaw and Sir George Keith every praise is due, for their able support during the bombardment." Mouat-Keith was presented with a gold medal by the Swedish Government. On 16 March 1814 Sir George transferred to HMS Variable on promotion to the rank of commander. No subsequent command is recorded. Variable appears to have been a schooner that had been purchased in Jamaica some years before and went out of service during 1814. The name was given to another schooner taken from the Americans in 1814, but not until later in the year.

On 21 January 1815 Mouat-Keith was noted in the Journals of the House of Commons as having been paid £21/1s/0d for carrying the Aide-de-Camp of the King of Prussia to Dover, and the Chancellor General to the Emperor of Russia to Ostend aboard the Redbreast.

== Legal action ==
In 1810 Mouat-Keith was the defendant in an action brought by one Arthur Nicolson (a direct descendant of Bishop Nicolson of Dunkeld) over the ownership of the Shetland isle of Papa Stour (then known as Pappa's Tower). Mr Nicolson, of Bullister and Lochend, was a merchant in Lerwick who purchased a large amount of landed property, including the Island of Papa Stour, which he acquired from John Scott of Scottshall on 16 May 1716. Mr Nicolson claimed possession of the island, and other lands, these having originally been 'acquired from the family of Mowat Keith' and by right of seisin in 1739. The root of the issue appears to be the renunciation of the lands by Mouat-Keith's father, John Mowat Keith, as a result of debts to John Scott. Mouat-Keith lost the case on the grounds that Mr Nicolson was effectively a 'sitting tenant'.

== Later life ==
In 1819 he published A Voyage to South America and the Cape of Good Hope in His Majesty's Brig Protector. Among its subscribers were including the Duke of Clarence, the Duke of Kent, Viscount Keith (no known relation), the Duke of Sussex, William Wilberforce MP and many other assorted Lords, Ladies, MPs. The book was dedicated to Viscount Melville of the Admiralty, who was also listed as a subscriber. Mouat-Keith was himself a subscriber to "A Geological Survey of the Yorkshire Coast".^{[c]}

In June 1820 Mouat-Keith visited Queen Caroline of Brunswick, the Queen consort of King George IV of the United Kingdom. He also had a miniature portrait by the "well-known Jewish miniaturist painter, Solomon Polack, a friend of William Makepeace Thackeray", a Flemish artist of 6, Artillery Lane, Bishopsgate Street, London, which was displayed at the Royal Academy of Arts.^{[d]}

== Family and death ==
Mouat-Keith married Catherine "Kitty" Howard, who was 14 years old at the time, on 1 May 1793 in Calcutta, India. They had at least one daughter, Margaret Rebecca Mouat-Keith, who married John Frederick Ellerton of the East India Company on 9 August 1816 in Calcutta. George Mouat-Keith died in Mantes, France (his death being reported in the Times) having lived in Evreux, France. Probate of the "Will of Sir George Mouat-Keith, Commander in His Britannic Majesty's Navy of Evreux, Normandy, France" did not occur until 5 January 1852, some 30 years after his death. Keith was reported to be a Christian who held services for his crews.

The Gentleman's Magazine for 1823 reported that George Mouat-Keith, only son of Sir George Keith, bart., RN, had died on 14 March of 'the African fever', at Sierra Leone, aged 18. In 1824 the Times reported the birth of a granddaughter, Elizabeth Mary Ellerton, at Keith's house in Camberwell.

== Notes ==
a. Mouat, Mowat and Monat are interchangeable middle names for the same family, all appearing on different family trees and official records.

b. There is a reference in "Aberdeen Journal Notes and Queries" Vol 2 p 118 that John Mowat Keith of Keithfield married Margaret, daughter of William Chalmers, merchant and late Provost of Aberdeen, in 1761. The estate of Keithfield was in the parish of Tarves, Aberdeenshire and was previously known as Tilliegonie.

c. The Admiralty Library has a copy of Keith's A voyage to South America and a German chart of the North Sea that was annotated by him when he was in command of HMS Redbreast in 1813.

d. According to information supplied privately by the Royal Academy Library "Solomon Polack was born at the Hague in 1757. He settled in England and exhibited miniatures at the Royal Academy from 1790 to 1835. He was in Ireland for a time, probably before 1790, and followed his profession as a miniature painter in Dublin with success. He died in Chelsea in 1839.".
