= HMS Piercer =

Brig-sloop of the Royal Navy

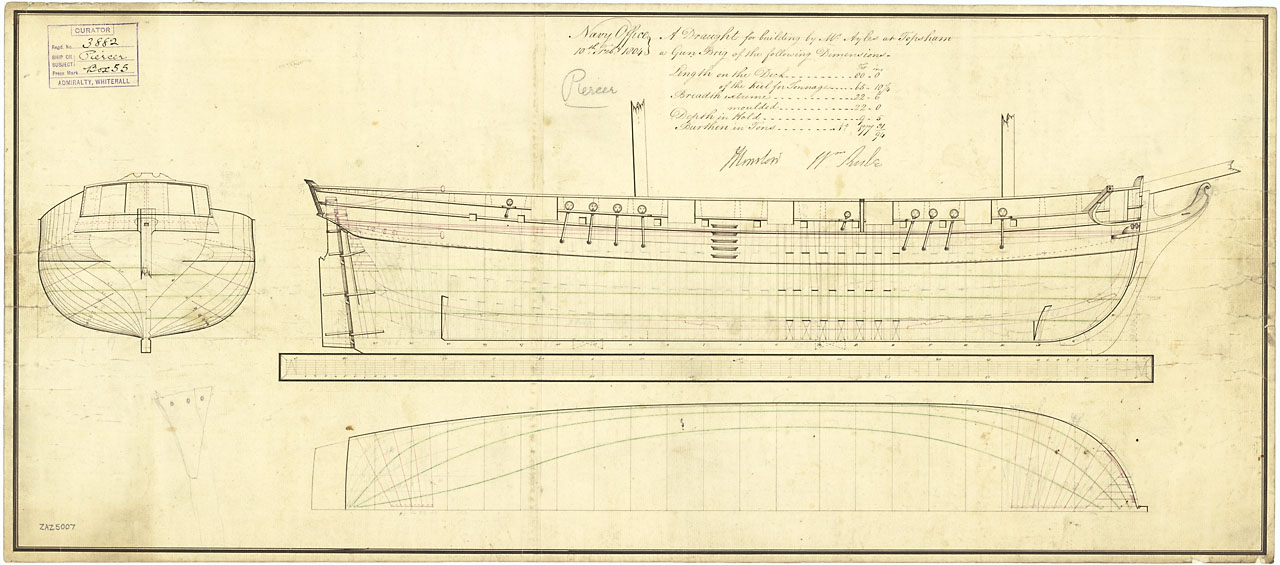
- Piercer

History

United Kingdom
- Name: HMS Piercer
- Operator: Royal Navy
- Builder: Obadiah Ayles, Topsham, Exeter
- Launched: 1804
- Decommissioned: 1814
- Honours and awards: Naval General Service Medal with clasp "Gluckstadt 5 Jany. 1814"
- Fate: Transferred to the Kingdom of Hanover 1814

Kingdom of Hanover
- Name: The Piercer
- Acquired: by transfer 4 June 1814
- Decommissioned: 1850
- Fate: Decommissioned 1850

General characteristics
- Class & type: Archer-class gun-brig
- Tons burthen: 17731/94 (bm)
- Length: 80 ft 0 in (24.38 m) (gundeck); 65 ft 0 in (19.81 m)64 ft (keel)
- Beam: 22 ft 6 3/4 in (6.877 m)
- Depth of hold: 9 ft 5 in (2.87 m)
- Sail plan: Brig
- Complement: 50
- Armament: 10 × 18-pounder carronades + 2 × bow chasers

HMS Piercer was a Royal Navy Archer-class gun-brig launched in 1804. She served against the French, Danes and Dutch in the Napoleonic Wars and was assigned to the Downs station. She participated in a number of operations in the Bay of Biscay, the English Channel, and the North Sea. In 1814 the British government transferred Piercer to the Kingdom of Hanover for use as a guard ship. Hanover decommissioned her in 1850.

== British service ==
Lieutenant Thomas Carew commissioned Piercer in September 1804. The next year she came under the command of Lieutenant John Sibrell, who had just transferred from the hired armed cutter Duchess of Cumberland, and who sailed her amongst the Channel Islands. In June 1805 Lieutenant Carter assumed command, apparently temporarily.

On 3 August 1805, Piercer was in a squadron with Blazer, Basilisk, Tigress, Bold, Ariadne and Furious when they captured the Frederick Wilhelm. At the time, Sibrell was in command of Piercer. Then on 8 April 1806, Basilisk captured Mercurius. Piercer shared in the prize money by private agreement.

In January 1807, Sibrell sailed Piercer for the North Sea. On 15 October Piercer, Leyden and Snake were in company at the capture of the Danish bark Narbvalen. Piercer shared by agreement in the proceeds of Escort's capture of the Danish ship Gamble Norge. On 15 October Piercer was in company with Snake and Leyden at the capture of the Danish brig Narhvalen and so later shared in the proceeds.

In November 1808 Sibrell captured the Danish vessels Catherina (4 November), and Speculation (6 November).

In January 1809, Piercer was driven ashore on the coast of Sweden. She was refloated, repaired, and returned to service.

During the Gunboat War, a flotilla of 25 Dano-Norwegian gunboats attacked a British convoy on 9 June 1809 off the island of Saltholm in Øresund Strait near Copenhagen. Piercer was one of the four British warships escorting the convoy. During the engagement the Danes captured 10 or 12 merchant vessels, as well as the gunbrig Turbulent.

Indefatigable captured two French chasse marees, the Camilla and the Bonne Rencontre, on 6 May 1810; Piercer and Scipion were in company. Piercer and the gun-brig Constant were in company with Surveillante when on 23 June she captured the chasse marees Margaret and the Eclair.

On 12 September 1810, Piercer was in company with a squadron under the command of Rear Admiral Sir H.B. Neal when Snapper captured the chasse maree Sophie. The vessels sharing in the prize included Caledonia, Valiant, Arrow, and the hired armed cutter Nimrod. The next day, Piercer captured the French sloop Saint Pierre.

Piercer was part of a squadron under Captain James Newman-Newman in Hero when the squadron captured the American vessel Beauty on 1 February 1811. Sibrell died in June and Lieutenant Joshua Kneeshaw assumed command.

On 14 August 1811 Piercer captured the chasse marees Marengo and Phillippe, off the Sables d'Olonne. Two weeks later, Piercer was in company with Acasta when they captured the Catharina Augusta.

In December Piercer witnessed an unfortunate occurrence for the Royal Navy. On the 27th, Conquestador and Colossus sent 120 men in six boats to attack a French convoy sailing along the shore in the Basque Roads. As the boats approached their quarry just south of the Chatillon Reef, the wind shifted, which permitted the convoy's escorts, three gun-brigs, an armed lugger and several pinnaces, to sally out and get between the British boats and their parent vessels. The French then attacked the boats, which tried to board their attackers. One British boat escaped, but a French gunboat captured Colossus's barge. The other four British boats ran onshore where the French captured them and their crews. The French account differs slightly, in that the brigs are reported as gunboats no.s 184, 186, and 191, and the other French attackers are ships' boats. Furthermore, M. Jacob, the commander of the French naval forces, states that he had anticipated the British attack and had made no overt response until the British boats were compromised. The French reported capturing 113 men, perhaps including five British sailors who were killed, two who died soon after, and several who were dangerously wounded. When he saw the French attacking, Captain Lord William Stuart of Conquestador signaled Piercer to protect the British boats and sent her a boat with eighteen seamen and marines as reinforcements, but she was unable (or unwilling) to do so. The captured British sailors remained prisoners of war until the end of the war.

On 10 December 1812 Piercer was in sight, and so shared in the prize money, when Arminde captured the chasse maree Civilité.

On 9 March 1813, Piercer recaptured the brig King George, of 100 tons (bm) and five men, which had been captured while sailing from Dublin to Newport.

By mid-1813, Piercer had been assigned to the Heligoland squadron commanded by Captain A. Farquhar in Desiree. On 10 July the squadron captured 19 boats on the rivers Elbe and Weser. (Note: A first-class share of the prize money was worth £80 10s 9d; a sixth-class share, that of an ordinary seaman, was worth £1 6d.)

Desiree arrived at Cuxhaven from Bremerlehe on 28 November to join the squadron that Shamrock, Captain Greene, had gathered. The British vessels had come to support the Russian troops under Colonel Alexander Radlinger, who were besieging the town. The squadron comprised Hearty, Blazer, Piercer, Shamrock, Redbreast, and the gun-boats No.s 1, 2, 3, 4, 5, 6, and 10. The two key positions were the French forts Napoleon and Phare. While the gunboats fired on Phare, the British landed a number of guns and established a battery of six 18-pounders, two 32-pounders, and two 6-pounders. Before the battery could start firing on the 30th, the French surrendered both forts. The French surrendered 26 heavy guns, two 13" mortars, and a blockhouse with a garrison of three hundred men and officers, all of whom became prisoners of war.

From late December 1813 Farquhar's squadron, comprising Desiree, Hearty, Blazer, Piercer, Shamrock, Redbreast, and eight gun-boats (the seven from Cuxhaven plus No. 12), supported Swedish forces under the command of General Baron de Boye against the Danes in the attack on the town and fortress of Glückstadt at the Elbe river during the War of the Sixth Coalition. The British arrived on 23 December and by 25 December had erected a battery of two 32-pounder guns. (They had landed six but the poor quality of the roads meant that only two were in place.) To support the bombardment on the next day, Farquhar sent in the gunboats and the brigs, whose armament he had reinforced with two 18-pounders each from Desiree. The bombardment continued to the 28th. Glückstadt having failed to surrender, Farquhar established three more batteries, one of two 18-pounders, one of four 32-pounders, and one of the two 13" mortars captured at Cuxhaven. An English rocket brigade under Lieutenant Amherst Wright contributed to the bombardment. These batteries commenced bombarding the town on 1 January 1814, keeping it up for the next two days. On 4 January Farquhar sent in a flag of truce, and after negotiations, the governor surrendered on 5 January. British casualties overall were light and Piercer had none.

Kneeshaw and Piercer brought the news back to Britain, arriving at the Admiralty on 12 January. (Note: The task of taking dispatches to London after a victory was generally a way for a commander to honour a particularly deserving subordinate and would frequently result in the subordinate's promotion. This was clearly Farquhar's intent.) That same day the Admiralty promoted Kneeshaw to Commander and re-rated Piercer as a sloop, congruent with his rank. On 15 July 1816 there was a first payment of £5000 in prize money to the navy for the capitulation of Glückstadt. The hired armed cutter Princess Augusta, shared in the prize money. (Note: A first-class share was worth £148 9s 8½d; a sixth-class share was £2 14s 8d.) In appreciation of this operation the Swedish government awarded Kneeshaw, amongst others, a gold medal. In 1847, the Admiralty awarded the Naval General Service Medal with clasp "Gluckstadt 5 Jany. 1814" to all surviving claimants from the action.

== Transferred to Hanover ==
On 4 June 1814, George III's birthday, Piercer was transferred in an official ceremony to the Kingdom of Hanover, following an Admiralty Order of 29 March. (The Kingdom of Hanover represented the restoration to George III of his Hanoverian territories after the Napoleonic Wars.)

The Hanoverians appointed Joachim Deetjen as captain of Piercer, and he remained her captain, and commander of the customs service, until his death in 1827. Piercer thus became the only warship in the rather short history of the newly created kingdom (1814 – 1866) and she served as a customs guard ship on the river Elbe with Stade as her homeport. (Note: The customs service also maintained a cutter and some sloops.) Deetjen's successor was Major Carl August Delius, who had served with the British at the Battle of Talavera, where he had lost an arm. He died in 1833 and on 22 November lieutenant colonel Andreas Schlüter became the last commander of the Elbe customs service. Although Piercer was initially suitable as a customs vessel, she and the other sailing vessels could not cope as steamships replaced sail. In 1850 the King ordered Piercer to be laid up, and on 20 October Schlüter tendered his resignation.

== Fate ==
She was decommissioned in 1850 without replacement.
