= HMS Isis (1819) =

Frigate of the Royal Navy

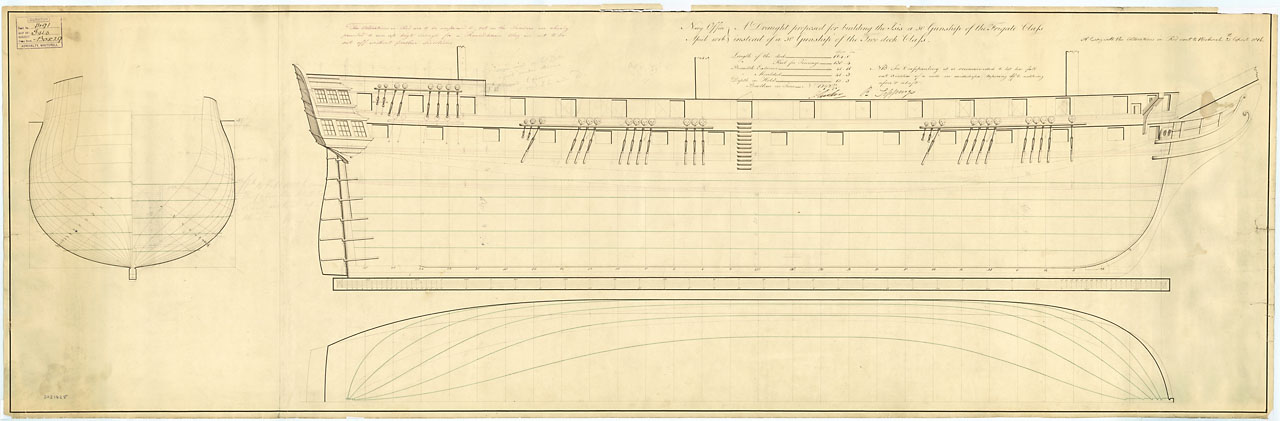
- Isis

History

United Kingdom
- Ordered: 10 September 1811 (as a two-decker)
- Builder: Woolwich Dockyard.
- Laid down: February 1816
- Launched: 5 October 1819
- Completed: 3 September 1823 at Chatham Dockyard
- Fate: Coal depot at Sierra Leone in March 1861, then sold to purportedly be broken up there on 12 March 1867 at liquidation.

General characteristics
- Tons burthen: 1,292 88/94 (as redesigned)
- Length: 164 ft 0 in (49.99 m)
- Beam: 41 ft 11 in (12.78 m)
- Depth of hold: 13 ft 3 in (4.04 m)
- Propulsion: Sail
- Complement: 350
- Armament: UD: Twenty-eight 24-pounder guns; QD & Fc twenty-eight 42-pounder carronades and two 24-pounder guns.

HMS Isis launched in 1819 was ordered in 1811 as a 50-gun two-decker of the fourth rate Salisbury class, but was redesigned while building, being lengthened on the stocks by 11 feet (3.4 m), and cut down by one deck to produce a spar-deck frigate, that is, to carry extra guns on the spar deck which linked the forecastle to the quarterdeck.

It was then intended for her to have carried 58 guns as shown in the table, but this weapon 'fit' was amended on 3 June 1823 to complete her as a 50-gun frigate with an unarmed spar deck, and she was later reduced in 1830 to a 44-gun frigate carrying twenty-six 32-pounder guns on the upper deck, twelve more 32-pounder guns on the quarterdeck, and two 32-pounder guns on the forecastle together with two 8-inch shell guns.

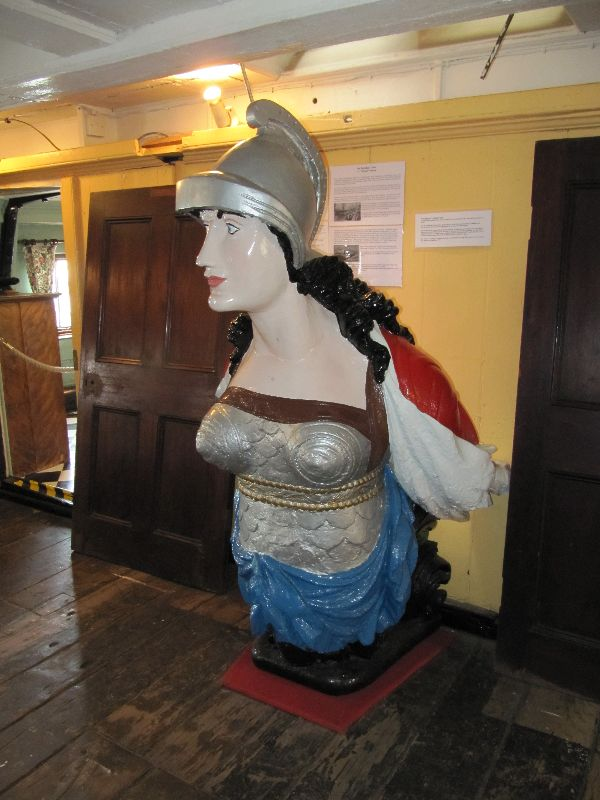
Figurehead of the Isis, currently on show in HMS Unicorn, Dundee.
