= HMS Patriot (1808) =

History

United Kingdom
- Name: HMS Patriot
- Acquired: 1808 by purchase
- Fate: Sold 1815

General characteristics
- Type: Schuyt
- Tons burthen: 49, or 81 bm
- Propulsion: Sails
- Armament: 10 guns

HMS Patriot was a Dutch schuyt that the Royal Navy captured in 1808 and took into service. She captured several enemy vessels before she was converted to a water vessel in 1813. The Admiralty sold her in 1815.

== Career ==
In 1809 Patriot was under the command of Lieutenant E. W. Mansel on the Heligoland station. On 29 May 1809 she captured a privateer, the Danish cutter Snap, in the River Hever. Snap was armed with three guns and had a crew of nine. She had left Tonningen one week before but had made no captures.

That same month Mansel advised Commander William Goate of Musquito that Patriot had captured a Dutch gunvessel of one gun, some swivel guns, and 10 men in the Jahde River, a Danish privateer of one gun, six swivels and 25 men, off Langerooz, and with the hired armed vessel Alert, destroyed two French privateers and a sloop, also in the Jahde.

On 2, 4, and 5 June 1809 Patriot captured a "Danish Blankenaise boat" of unknown name, and two Dutch gunboats, Calais and Suapup. (Note: A first-class share of the prize money was worth £41 6s; a sixth-class share, that of an ordinary seaman, was worth £4 5s.)

Later in June 1809 a landing party from Blazer, Patriot, and Alert, under the command of Mansell and Lieutenant M'Dougall of Alert, attacked some French customs officers and soldiers stationed at Ekwarden in the River Jahde. The British drove the French from their posts and captured two customs boats, and one Danish and five French galiots. The British brought out their prizes, together with merchandise that the Danes and French had seized. There were no British casualties.

Then Lord George Stuart gave Goate command of a small force consisting of Musquito, the two Cherokee-class brig-sloops HMS Briseis, and HMS Ephira, five gun-brigs, including HMS Basilisk, and Patriot and Alert. On 7 July 1809 they entered the Elbe. There was an artillery battery at Cuxhaven so they anchored out of range of its cannons.

Next morning at daylight Goate led a landing party but before they could attack the battery its 80-man garrison retreated, abandoning their guns. The British then loaded the battery's six 24-pounders into vessels lying in the harbor, together with all the shot and military stores they could find and some other small guns. Next, they blew up the fort and seized two French gunboats, each of two guns. Lastly, the landing party handed the town of Cuxhaven back to the civil governor before returning to its vessels. Later, Mosquito, Basilisk and HMS Aimable shared in the prize money.

A month later, on 10 August 1809, Paz and Patriot were in company at Hocksyl. There they captured the Danish privateer Blankanaise, a sloop laden with linen, a lugger in ballast, and sundry goods. (Note: A first-class share of the prize money was worth £46 17s 11½d; a sixth-class share, that of an ordinary seaman, was worth £3 8s 6d.) Two weeks later, Patriot, Paz, and the gun-vessels Censor and HMS Jahde captured property at Harlinger Zyl, together with a Danish privateer and a mutt in ballast. The next month, on 11 September, HMS Pincher, Patriot, Paz, and Jahde shared in the capture of vessels referred to in the prize-money announcement as Young Pincher, Young Paz, and Young Patriot. On 31 October, Patriot, in company with Alert, captured Dorothea. (Note: A first-class share was worth £116 3s 8¾d; a sixth-class share was worth £14 10s 5¼d.)

On 17 November 1809, Patriot was driven ashore on Düne in the Heligoland Bight. She was refloated, repaired, and returned to service.

At some point Mansel died and Lieutenant William Hutchinson replaced him in command of Patriot. A biographical note reports that in 1810 Hutchinson was in command of a division of armed schuyts operating in the Elbe, Weser, and Ems. On 8 September 1810 Hutchinson was in command when Patriot and HMS Bruizer captured the "file and brick ships" Gute Hoffnung, Vrow Catherina, and Dree Gesusters. (Note: A first-class share was worth £10 19s 0¾d; a sixth-class share was worth 17s 1¾d) By 1811 Patriot was at Great Yarmouth. Hutchinson continued to command her into 1813.

== Fate ==
Patriot was converted into a water vessel in 1813. In December 1815 the Admiralty put three schuyts, HMS Ems, HMS Jahde and Patriot, up for sale at Chatham. All sold in 1815.
