= HMS Shamrock (1812) =

Brig of the Royal Navy

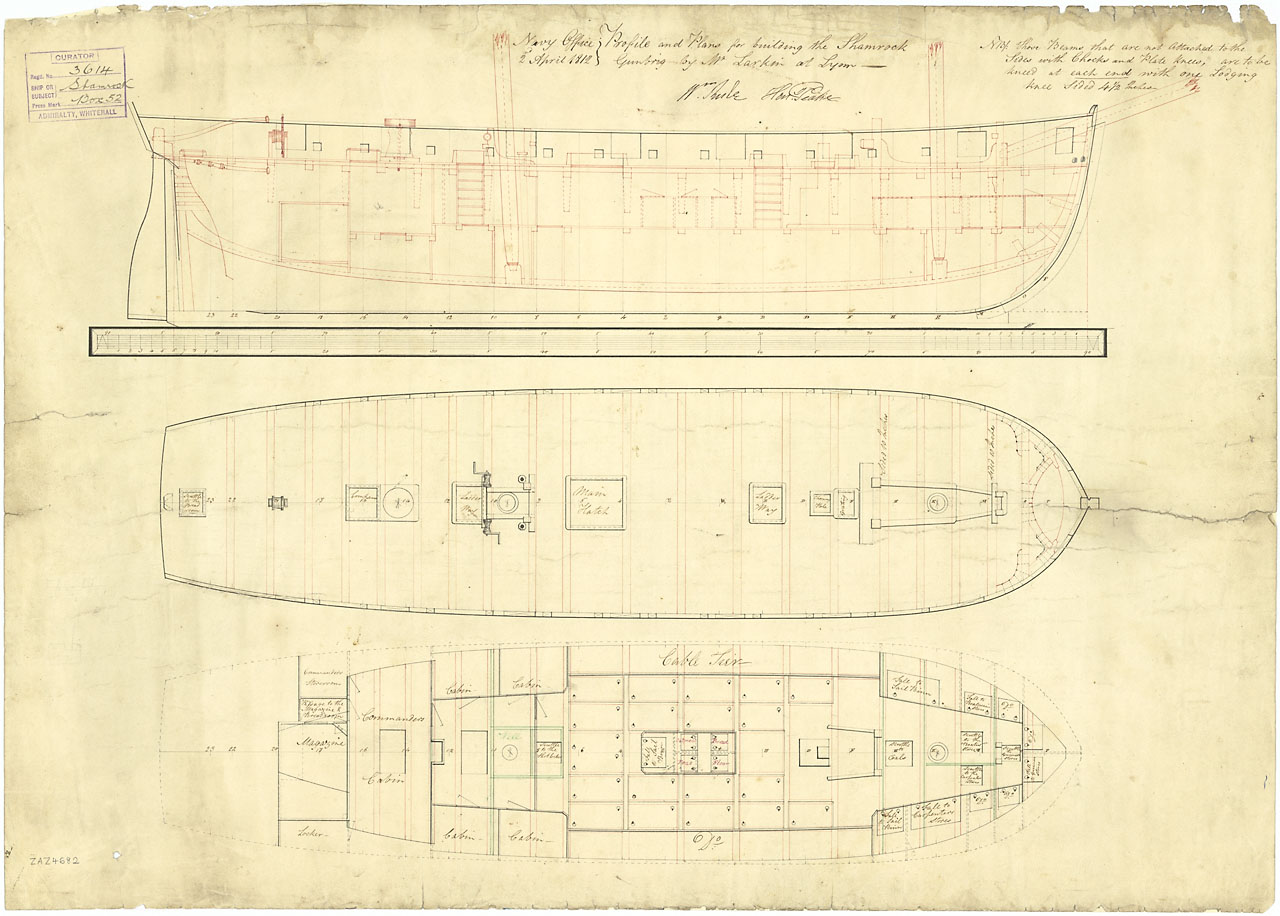
- Shamrock

History

United Kingdom
- Name: HMS Shamrock
- Namesake: The Shamrock
- Ordered: 16 November 1811
- Builder: Edward Larking, King's Lynn
- Laid down: March 1812
- Launched: August 1812
- Honours and awards: Naval General Service Medal with clasp "Gluckstadt 5 Jany. 1814"
- Fate: Sold 1867

General characteristics
- Class & type: Bold-class gun-brig
- Tons burthen: 17968/94 (bm)
- Length: Overall:84 ft 1 in (25.6 m); Keel:69 ft 9 3/4 in (21.3 m)
- Beam: 22 ft 0 in (6.7 m)
- Depth of hold: 11 ft 0 1/4 in (3.4 m)
- Sail plan: Brig
- Complement: 60
- Armament: 10 × 18-pounder carronades + 2 × 9-pounder chase guns

HMS Shamrock was a Bold-class gun-brig launched in 1812. In 1813-14 she played an important role in the captures of Cuxhaven and Glückstadt. After the war she became a survey vessel, and then a quarantine ship. She was delivered to the Coast Guard in 1833 as a watch vessel and was re-designated WV18 in 1863. She was sold in 1867.

== Wartime service ==
Commander Andrew Pellet Green's commission as commander was dated 1 February 1812. He commissioned Shamrock in November.

Shamrock initially served on the Downs station. In April 1813 she was placed under the orders of Captain M'Kerlie of the Heligoland squadron.

Green sailed Shamrock to Cuxhaven where he took command of a squadron comprising Hearty, Blazer, Piercer, Redbreast, and gun-boats No.s 1, 2, 3, 4, 5, 8, and 10. The British vessels had come to support the Russian troops under Colonel Alexander Radlinger, who were besieging the town.

Captain Arthur Farquhar in Desiree arrived at Cuxhaven from Bremerlehe on 28 November to take command of the squadron that Captain Greene had gathered.

The two key French positions were the forts Napoleon and Phare. While the gunboats fired on Phare, the British landed a number of guns and established a battery of six 18-pounders, two 32-pounders, and two 6-pounders. Before the battery could start firing on the 30th, the French surrendered both forts. The French surrendered 26 heavy guns, two 13" mortars, and a blockhouse with a garrison of three hundred men and officers, all of whom became prisoners of war.

On 11 November 1813 Commander John Marshall assumed command of Shamrock He joined her off Cuxhaven. Green was appointed to command Harrier, but delayed, remaining with Farquhar as a volunteer. He was made a knight of the Royal Hanoverian Guelphic Order and the Swedish Order of the Sword for his services at Cuxhaven.

Marshall received orders to proceed further up the Elbe with the gun-boats. The flotilla's objective was to watch the French at Gluckstadt until the arrival there of the Swedish troops under the Baron de Boyé.

From late December 1813 Farquhar's squadron, comprising Desiree, Hearty, Blazer, Piercer, Shamrock, Redbreast, and eight gun-boats (the seven from Cuxhaven plus No. 12), supported Swedish forces under the command of General Baron de Boye against the Danes in the attack on the town and fortress of Glückstadt at the Elbe river during the War of the Sixth Coalition.

The British arrived on 23 December and by 25 December had erected a battery of two 32-pounder guns. (They had landed six but the poor quality of the roads meant that only two were in place.) To support the bombardment on the next day, Farquhar sent in the gunboats and the brigs, whose armament he had reinforced with two 18-pounders each from Desiree. The bombardment continued to the 28th. Glückstadt having failed to surrender, Farquhar established three more batteries, one of two 18-pounders, one of four 32-pounders, and one of the two 13" mortars captured at Cuxhaven. An English rocket brigade under Lieutenant Amherst Wright contributed to the bombardment. These batteries commenced bombarding the town on 1 January 1814, keeping it up for the next two days. On 4 January Farquhar sent in a flag of truce, and after negotiations, the governor surrendered on 5 January. British casualties overall were light; none were from Shamrock.

The Swedish troops arrived on 5 January 1814 and four days later Marshall entered the harbour at Gluckstadt where he took possession of the Danish flotilla of one brig and seven gunboats.

Marshall then was despatched to Kiel to establish the squadron's claims to the enemy's vessels, stores, etc. captured on the Elbe. When the ice broke up, Shamrock moved to Cuxhaven where she remained. However, her only Lieutenant, James Edgecombe, took command of six gunboats and assisted at the blockades of Hamburg and Haarburg.

Marshall received promotion to post captain on 7 June 1814. He was made a Companion of the Most Honourable Military Order of the Bath, Knight of the highest Russian Military Order of St. George, and knight of the Swedish order of the Sword.

On 15 July 1816 there was a first payment of £5000 in prize money to the navy for the capitulation of Glückstadt. (Note: A first-class share was worth £148 9s 8½d; a sixth-class share was £2 14s 8d.) In 1847, the Admiralty awarded the Naval General Service Medal with clasp "Gluckstadt 5 Jany. 1814" to all surviving claimants from the action.

Commander Christopher Askew commanded Shamrock from June 1814 on the Irish station. She was paid off into ordinary in October 1815 at Plymouth.

== Post-war ==
Between November 1816 and February 1817, Shamrock underwent fitting at Plymouth for a survey vessel. Commander Martin White commissioned her in May for surveying in the Channel. She proceeded to survey the coasts of England, Ireland, Jersey, and Guernsey.

On 22 October 1820 Shamrock was caught in a gale at St Helen's Pople, Scilly. (Note: This may have been St Helen's Pool, a sheltered anchorage just south of St Helen's, Isles of Scilly.) She had to cut away both her masts.

Commander Martin left Shamrock in 1828. She was at Woolwich in 1829 where between September 1830 and 1831 she underwent fitting as a quarantine ship.

== Coast Guard ==
The Admiralty delivered Shamrock in March 1833 to the Coast Guard. The Coast Guard then used her as a watch vessel at Rochester, Kent. On 25 May 1863 the Coastguard re-designated Shamrock WV 18.

== Fate ==
Shamrock's sale was reported on 24 January 1867.
