= Duchess (disambiguation) =

Duchess is a rank of nobility, the female equivalent of Duke.

Duchess may also refer to:

== Arts and entertainment ==
=== Fictional characters ===
- Duchess (Alice's Adventures in Wonderland)
- Lashina, a DC Comics character also known as "Duchess"
- Duchess, a character in Foster's Home for Imaginary Friends, an American animated television series
- "Duchess", the code name for the title character in the American animated television series Archer
- Duchess, a female white cat in the 1970 Disney animated film The Aristocats
- Duchess (of Loughborough), a royal locomotive from the Thomas & Friends franchise
- The Duchess (of Boxford), a person from the Thomas & Friends franchise
- The Duchess, from the video game American McGee's Alice

=== Music ===
- "Duchess" (Genesis song), 1980
- "Duchess" (The Stranglers song), 1979
- "Duchess", a song by Scott Walker from Scott 4
- Also, The Dutchess, an album by Fergie.

=== Other arts and entertainment ===
- The Duchess (film), 2008
- The Duchess (TV series), 2020
- The Duchess, a 1998 book by Amanda Foreman
- Duchess, 2024 British crime film

== Places ==
- Duchess, Queensland, a township in Cloncurry, Australia
- Duchess, Alberta, a village in Canada
- Duchess Landing, Oklahoma, a US settlement
- Duchess Theatre, London, England

== People ==
- The Duchess, nickname of convicted murderer Juanita Spinelli
- Norma-Jean Wofford (c. 1942–2005), nicknamed "The Duchess", rhythm guitarist with Bo Diddley
- The Duchess, pen name of Irish novelist Margaret Wolfe Hungerford

== Transport ==
- Duchess (sponge hooking boat), a historic boat in Tarpon Springs, Florida
- Beechcraft Duchess, an American monoplane
- Duchess class, a name for unstreamlined LMS Coronation Class British steam locomotives
- Flying Duchess, a 1951–1952 British steam locomotive that ran in the United States

== Other uses ==
- HMS Duchess, any of several British ships
- Duchess (restaurant), a restaurant chain in Connecticut, USA
- Duchess (drink), a pear-flavoured soft drink from Georgia
- Duchess (solitaire), a card game
- Duchess lorikeet (Charmosyna margarethae), a species of parrot
- Duchess potatoes, a cuisine item
- The Duchess Stakes, a Canadian horse race
- The Duchess (horse) (1813–1836), British Thoroughbred racehorse
- Duchess, a brand of packaged sweet baked goods made by Carolina Foods
- Duchess, Australian English term for a dressing table
- "The Duchess", a limousine once owned by abdicated UK king Edward VIII and later restored by Morgan Murphy
- Duchesses (women's cricket), a women's cricket team from South Africa
- Duchess (chess variant), a 2-6 players chess variant

== See also ==
- Dutchess (disambiguation)
