= HMS Duchess =

Five ships of the Royal Navy have borne the name HMS Duchess:

- HMS Duchess (1652), a 24-gun ship, previously the French ship Duchesse captured in 1652 and sold in 1654.
- HMS Duchess (1679), a 90-gun second rate launched in 1679. She was renamed HMS Princess Anne in 1701, HMS Windsor Castle in 1702, and HMS Blenheim in 1706. She was broken up in 1763.
- HMS Duchess (1916), a paddle steamer named Duchess of Fife launched in 1903, and taken into Royal Navy service from 1916 to 1919. The vessel was sold in 1923.
- HMS Duchess (H64), a D-class destroyer launched in 1932 and sunk in a collision with HMS Barham in 1939.
- HMS Duchess (D154), a Daring-class destroyer launched in 1951. She was transferred to the Royal Australian Navy in 1964, and was broken up in 1980.

== See also ==
- Duchess (ship), a 280-ton, Bristol-built vessel that circumnavigated the globe during 1708–11. Although not a naval vessel, this feat is the basis of the ship's badge assigned to Royal Navy vessels named Duchess.
- HMNZS Duchess (T07), a 314-ton merchant vessel used by the Royal New Zealand Navy from 1940 to 1947.
- HMS Duchess of Cumberland
