= Tiesenhausen (disambiguation) =

Tiesenhausen is the name of a Baltic German nobility family

It can also be a surname as in von Tiesenhausen. Notable people with the name include

- Ferdinand von Tiesenhausen (1782–1805), Russian noble and military officer of German Baltic origin
- Georg von Tiesenhausen (1914–2018), German-American rocket scientist
- Gerhard von Tiesenhausen (1878–1917), Livonian art nouveau architect
- Hans-Diedrich von Tiesenhausen (1913–2000), German naval commander during World War II
