= Tarhun =

Tarhun may refer to:

- Tarhun, the Hittite thunder god, known to the Hurrians as Teshub.
- Tarhun (drink)
