= Capture of HMS Savage =

1781 battle of the American Revolutionary War

Coordinates: 32.690°N 79.837°W

- Part of the American Revolutionary War
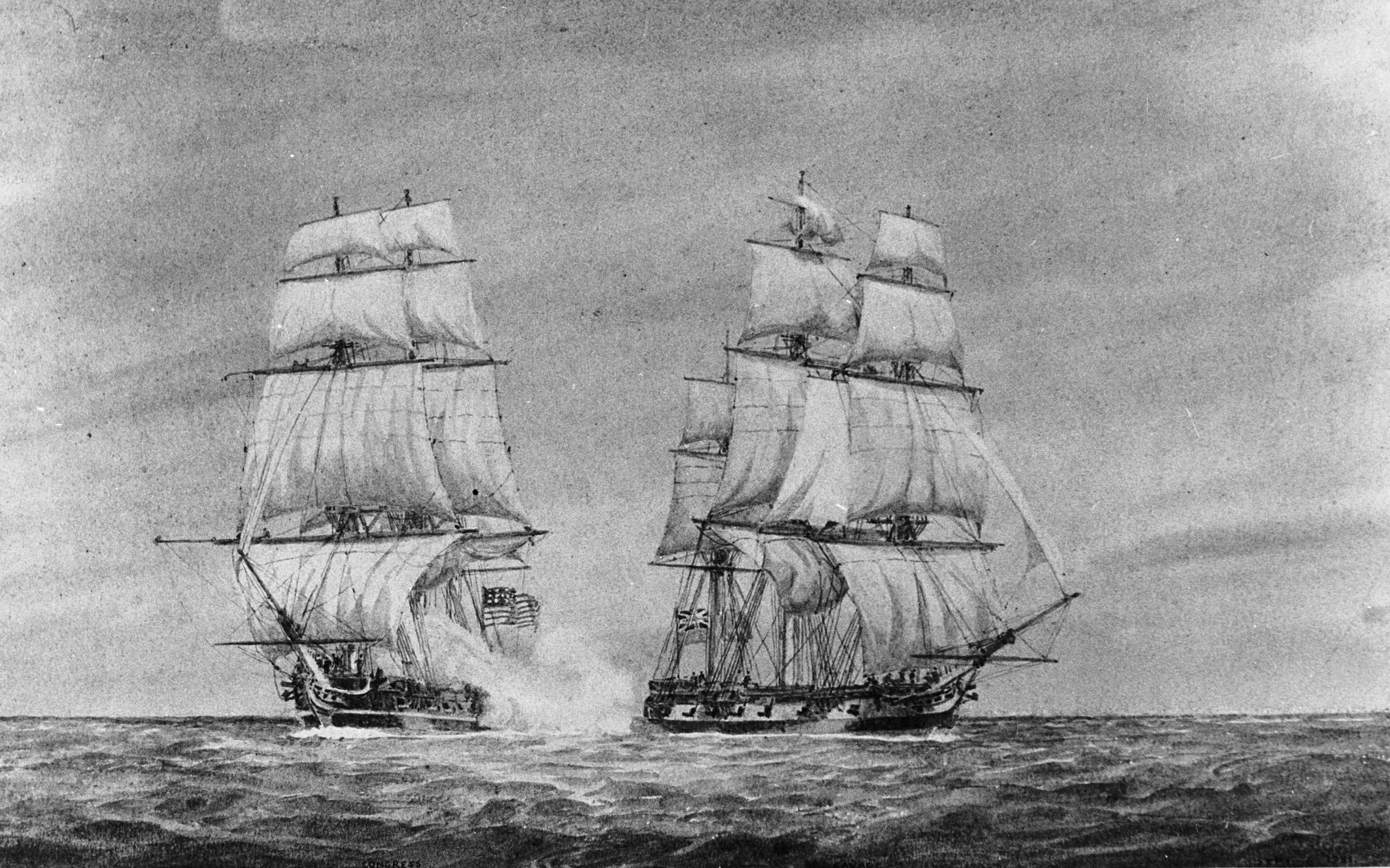
- Illustration of the battle
Date	September 6, 1781
Location	off Charleston, Atlantic Ocean
Result	American victory

Belligerents
United States	Great Britain

Commanders and leaders
George Geddes	Charles Stirling (surrendered)

Strength
1 sloop	1 sloop-of war

Casualties and losses
11 killed ~30 wounded	8 killed 26 wounded 1 sloop-of-war captured

The capture of HMS Savage took place on September 6, 1781, during the American Revolutionary War. Off Charleston, South Carolina, the 16-gun American privateer Congress captured HMS Savage, a 16-gun sloop-of-war of the Royal Navy. The engagement is considered one of the hardest-fought single ship actions of the war.

== Background ==
By 1781 the smaller British vessels blockading Chesapeake Bay were raiding the American coast by means of boat expeditions. One commander involved in the operations was Lieutenant Charles Stirling of the sloop Savage, armed with sixteen 6-pounders. In the early morning of September 6, Savage was escorting a convoy when she encountered the sloop-of-war Congress ten leagues from Charleston. Stirling placed Savage between the merchant vessels and the stranger.

Congress was under the command of Captain George Geddes of Philadelphia, armed with twenty 12-pounders and four 6-pounders, with a complement of 215 officers and men. Its marines were under the command of Captain Allan McLane of the Continental Army. Congress was returning from Cap-François, Haiti, where McLane had carried dispatches from George Washington to Comte François Joseph Paul de Grasse, commander of a French fleet, appealing for his aid at Chesapeake Bay.

== Battle ==
When Stirling first saw Congress he sailed towards her, in the hope that she was a privateer of twenty 9-pounder guns that had been raiding in the area. However, when he got closer and saw that she was significantly stronger even than the privateer he thought she might be, Stirling attempted an escape. (Note: Savage had a broadside of 48 pounds; Congress had a broadside of 132 pounds. (The privateer Stirling thought Congress was would have had a broadside of 90 pounds, or almost twice that of Savage.) Savage also had 90 fewer men on board than Congress.) However, by 10:30 am the Americans came within range and opened fire with their bow chasers. By 11:00 Congress had closed the distance and her crew engaged with muskets and pistols, to which the British replied with "energy". At this point Geddes observed that his ship was faster than that of the enemy so he maneuvered ahead of Savage until almost abreast, in preparation for a broadside.

A duel then commenced at extreme close range, during which both ships were heavily damaged. Sailors on both sides were also burned by the flashes of their enemy's cannon. Congress's rigging was torn to shreds during the exchange, which compelled the Americans to stand off for quick repairs. After doing so, they resumed the chase. Congress was swiftly alongside the Savage again and another duel began. The Americans and British fought for about an hour, the combat ending with Savage in ruins. Her quarterdeck and forecastle had been completely cleared of resistance, her mizzenmast was blown away, and her mainmast was nearly gone as well. Geddes felt that this was an opportune time to board the enemy, but just as he was moving his ship in, a boatswain appeared on Savage's forecastle, waving his hat as a sign of surrender. Savage's crew lost eight men killed and 34 wounded, including Stirling; the Americans had 11 killed and around 30 wounded. In his letter reporting on the action, Stirling noted that after he and his men became prisoners, the Americans had treated them "with great Humanity."

== Aftermath ==
In America, the capture was widely cheered as payback for the raid on Mount Vernon by Savage on 14 April 1781. However, the Americans who boarded Savage never made it back to port. The frigate HMS Solebay recaptured Savage on 12 September, with a prize crew of thirty Americans aboard. Maclay states that the same frigate captured Congress and recaptured Savage. (Note: Maclay further states that Congress became HMS Duchess of Cumberland, and on 19 September wrecked during the passage to Newfoundland where a prison ship was waiting to take on the American prisoners. Twenty men died in the incident, though the survivors eventually made it to Placentia, where the Americans were put aboard the ship sloop HMS Fairy and taken to Old Mill Prison in England. This appears incorrect. The court martial record for her loss reports she sailed on 21 September from Placentia and was wrecked on 22 September. The nautical distance between Charleston and Halifax, Nova Scotia, is such that a vessel sailing at a steady 10 knots, a fast pace for a sailing vessel, would take four and a half days, and Placentia lies beyond Halifax, making it extremely improbable that a vessel captured on 12 September at Charleston would be sailing again from Placentia on 21 September, let alone 19 September. Furthermore Duchess of Cumberland was a cutter (or sloop; accounts vary) of 125 tons burthen and 16 guns. Lastly, early in his book, Maclay states that Congress/Duchess of Cumberland was built in Beverley, Massachusetts; Geddes's Congress was a Philadelphia privateer. She may have been a Congress, but if so, she may have been Congress, of eighteen 9-pounders guns, and 120 men, that HMS Oiseaux captured sometime between 16 June and 2 July 1781.) (The London Gazette mentions the recapture of Savage, but not the capture of her captor Congress.)
