= HMS Duchess of Cumberland =

Two vessels that served the Royal Navy have been named Duchess of Cumberland:

- HMS Duchess of Cumberland (1781) 6-gun sloop HMS Duchess of Cumberland, under Commander Edward Marsh. Duchess of Cumberland was wrecked on 22 September 1781 on Cape St. Mary's during a heavy fog. She had been escorting a convoy from Placentia, Newfoundland and Labrador. Note: Manley has the report that the Duchess of Cumberland was the American privateer Congress, of Beverley, Massachusetts. Congress was armed with eighteen 9-pounders guns, and had a crew of 120 men. HMS Oiseaux captured her at some point between 16 June and 2 July 1781. (Note: This Congress was almost surely not the Congress involved in the capture of HMS Savage. "Oiseau" is French for bird; however this report is incorrect. The Royal Navy took Congress in as HMS Morning Star)
- His Majesty's hired armed cutter Duchess of Cumberland.
