= German submarine U-331 =

German World War II submarine

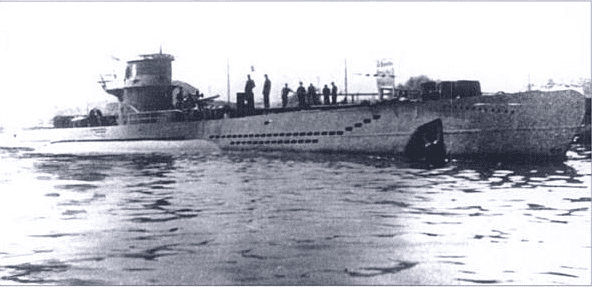
- U-331

History

Nazi Germany
- Name: U-331
- Ordered: 23 September 1939
- Builder: Nordseewerke, Emden
- Yard number: 203
- Laid down: 26 January 1940
- Launched: 20 December 1940
- Commissioned: 31 March 1941
- Fate: Sunk on 17 November 1942

General characteristics
- Class & type: Type VIIC submarine
- Displacement: 769 tonnes (757 long tons) surfaced; 871 t (857 long tons) submerged
- Length: 67.10 m (220 ft 2 in) o/a; 50.50 m (165 ft 8 in) pressure hull
- Beam: 6.20 m (20 ft 4 in) o/a; 4.70 m (15 ft 5 in) pressure hull
- Height: 9.60 m (31 ft 6 in)
- Draught: 4.74 m (15 ft 7 in)
- Installed power: 2,800–3,200 PS (2,100–2,400 kW; 2,800–3,200 bhp) (diesels); 750 PS (550 kW; 740 shp) (electric)
- Propulsion: 2 shafts; 2 × diesel engines; 2 × electric motors
- Speed: 17.7 knots (32.8 km/h; 20.4 mph) surfaced; 7.6 knots (14.1 km/h; 8.7 mph) submerged
- Range: 8,500 nmi (15,700 km; 9,800 mi) at 10 knots (19 km/h; 12 mph) surfaced; 80 nmi (150 km; 92 mi) at 4 knots (7.4 km/h; 4.6 mph) submerged
- Test depth: 230 m (750 ft); Crush depth: 250–295 m (820–968 ft)
- Complement: 4 officers, 40–56 enlisted
- Armament: 4 × 53.3 cm (21 in) bow torpedo tubes; 14 × torpedoes or 26 TMA mines; 1 × 8.8 cm (3.46 in) deck gun (220 rounds); 1 x 2 cm (0.79 in) C/30 AA gun

Service record
- Part of: 1st U-boat Flotilla; 31 March – 14 October 1941; 23rd U-boat Flotilla; 15 October 1941 – 14 April 1942; 29th U-boat Flotilla; 15 April – 17 November 1942
- Identification codes: M 37 182
- Commanders: Kptlt. Hans-Diedrich von Tiesenhausen; 31 March 1941 – 17 November 1942
- Operations: 10 patrols: 1st patrol: 2 July – 19 August 1941; 2nd patrol: 24 September – 11 October 1941; 3rd patrol: 12 November – 3 December 1941; 4th patrol: 14 January – 28 February 1942; 5th patrol: 4 – 19 April 1942; 6th patrol: 9 – 21 May 1942; 7th patrol: 25 May – 15 June 1942; 8th patrol: 5 – 10 August 1942; 9th patrol: 12 August – 19 September 1942; 10th patrol: 7 – 17 November 1942
- Victories: 1 warship sunk (31,100 tons); 1 auxiliary warship sunk (9,135 GRT); 1 warship damaged (372 tons)

German submarine U-331 was a Type VIIC U-boat of Nazi Germany's Kriegsmarine during World War II, famous for sinking the battleship HMS Barham.

The submarine was laid down on 26 January 1940 at the Nordseewerke yard at Emden, launched on 20 December 1940, and commissioned on 31 March 1941 under the command of Oberleutnant zur See Hans-Diedrich Freiherr von Tiesenhausen. She was tracked by the RAF and crippled before being destroyed by the Royal Navy Fleet Air Arm on 17 November 1942 with the loss of most of her crew.

== Design ==
German Type VIIC submarines were preceded by the shorter Type VIIB submarines. U-331 had a displacement of 769 tonnes (757 long tons) when at the surface and 871 tonnes (857 long tons) while submerged. She had a total length of 67.10 m (220 ft 2 in), a pressure hull length of 50.50 m (165 ft 8 in), a beam of 6.20 m (20 ft 4 in), a height of 9.60 m (31 ft 6 in), and a draught of 4.74 m (15 ft 7 in). The submarine was powered by two Germaniawerft F46 four-stroke, six-cylinder supercharged diesel engines producing a total of 2,800 to 3,200 metric horsepower (2,060 to 2,350 kW; 2,760 to 3,160 shp) for use while surfaced, two AEG GU 460/8–27 double-acting electric motors producing a total of 750 metric horsepower (550 kW; 740 shp) for use while submerged. She had two shafts and two 1.23 m (4 ft) propellers. The boat was capable of operating at depths of up to 230 metres (750 ft).

The submarine had a maximum surface speed of 17.7 knots (32.8 km/h; 20.4 mph) and a maximum submerged speed of 7.6 knots (14.1 km/h; 8.7 mph). When submerged, the boat could operate for 80 nautical miles (150 km; 92 mi) at 4 knots (7.4 km/h; 4.6 mph); when surfaced, she could travel 8,500 nautical miles (15,700 km; 9,800 mi) at 10 knots (19 km/h; 12 mph). U-331 was fitted with four bow 53.3 cm (21 in) torpedo tubes, fourteen torpedoes, one 8.8 cm (3.46 in) SK C/35 naval gun, 220 rounds, and a 2 cm (0.79 in) C/30 anti-aircraft gun. The boat had a complement of between forty-four and sixty.

== Service history ==
=== First patrol ===
U-331's first patrol took her from Kiel in Germany on 2 July 1941, out into the mid-Atlantic, before arriving at Lorient in France on 19 August.

=== Second patrol ===
She sailed from Lorient on 24 September and headed into the Mediterranean Sea. There on 10 October she engaged three British tank landing craft off Sidi Barrani, Egypt. After missing with a torpedo, she engaged with her deck gun, slightly damaging HMS TLC-18 (A 18), before breaking off the attack after being hit by 40 mm shells, which wounded two men (one fatally) and damaged the conning tower. She arrived at Salamis, Greece, the next day, 11 October.

=== Third patrol-HMS Barham ===
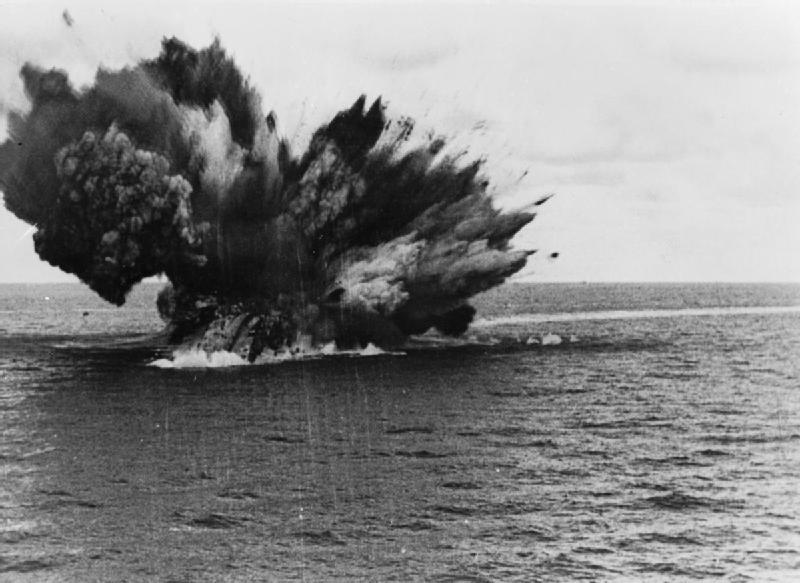
HMS Barham's main magazines explode, 25 November 1941

Sailing from Salamis on 12 November 1941, U-331 returned to the Egyptian coast. On 17 November she landed seven men of the Lehrregiment Brandenburg east of Ras Gibeisa, on a mission to blow up a railway line near the coast, which failed. On 25 November 1941, north of Sidi Barrani, U-331 fired three torpedoes into the British Queen Elizabeth-class battleship HMS Barham. As the ship rolled over, her magazines exploded and she quickly sank with the loss of 861 men, while 395 were rescued. U-331 returned to Salamis on 3 December, where her commander, Freiherr Hans-Diedrich von Tiesenhausen, was subsequently promoted to Kapitänleutnant and awarded the Knight's Cross of the Iron Cross.

=== Fourth and fifth patrol ===
U-331 left Salamis on 14 January 1942 for another patrol off the Egyptian coast, this time with no success. She then sailed for La Spezia, Italy, arriving on 28 February.

Her next patrol was the reverse of the previous one, she left La Spezia on 4 April, patrolled the enemy coast, then returned to Salamis on 19 April.

=== Sixth to ninth patrol ===
Her next four patrols were similarly uneventful, operating from Messina, Sicily, and then La Spezia again, from May to September 1942, patrolling the North African coast without success.

=== Tenth patrol ===
U-331 departed La Spezia on her final voyage on 7 November 1942 to attack the massed ships of "Operation Torch". Two days later, on 9 November, U-331 sighted the American 9,135 GRT troopship USS Leedstown (AP-73) off Algiers. The Leedstown had landed troops on the night of 7/8 November, and the next day had been hit by an aerial torpedo from a Ju 88 torpedo bomber of III./KG 26 destroying her steering gear and flooding the after section. U-331 fired a spread of four torpedoes at the ship hitting her with two. Leedstown settled by the bow with a heavy starboard list, and was abandoned, finally sinking two hours later.

On 13 November U-331 was attacked by an escort ship and was slightly damaged when she dived too deep and hit the sea bed.

==== Sinking ====
U-331 was sunk on 17 November, north of Algiers in position 37°05′N 2°27′E. She had been badly damaged after being attacked by a Lockheed Hudson bomber of No. 500 Squadron RAF, with the forward hatch jammed open, preventing the submarine from diving, and she signalled surrender to the Hudson. The destroyer HMS Wilton was ordered to seize the submarine, but an airstrike by three Fairey Albacore torpedo-bombers from 820 Naval Air Squadron escorted by two Grumman Martlet fighters of 893 Naval Air Squadron was launched from the British aircraft carrier HMS Formidable against the damaged submarine. Unaware of any surrender signals, the Martlets strafed U-331 which was then sunk by a torpedo dropped from one of the Albacores. Of her crew 32 were killed and 17 survived, including her commander.

=== Wolfpacks ===
U-331 took part in one wolfpack, namely:

- Goeben (24 – 30 September 1941)

== Summary of raiding history ==
Date	Ship Name	Nationality	Tonnage (Note: Merchant ship tonnages are in gross register tons. Military vessels are listed by tons displacement.)	Fate
10 October 1941	HMS TLC-18	Royal Navy	372	Damaged
25 November 1941	HMS Barham	Royal Navy	31,100	Sunk
9 November 1942	USS Leedstown	United States Navy	9,135	Sunk

== See also ==
- Mediterranean U-boat Campaign (World War II)

== Bibliography ==
- Busch, Rainer; Röll, Hans-Joachim (1999). German U-boat commanders of World War II : a biographical dictionary. Translated by Brooks, Geoffrey. London, Annapolis, Md: Greenhill Books, Naval Institute Press. ISBN 1-55750-186-6.
- Busch, Rainer; Röll, Hans-Joachim (1999). Deutsche U-Boot-Verluste von September 1939 bis Mai 1945 [German U-boat losses from September 1939 to May 1945]. Der U-Boot-Krieg (in German). Vol. IV. Hamburg, Berlin, Bonn: Mittler. ISBN 3-8132-0514-2.
- Frampton, Victor (2017). "Question 34/51: Manned Torpedo Attack on HMS Barham". Warship International. LIV (4): 288–289. ISSN 0043-0374.
- Gröner, Erich; Jung, Dieter; Maass, Martin (1991). German Warships 1815–1945, U-boats and Mine Warfare Vessels. Vol. 2. Translated by Thomas, Keith; Magowan, Rachel. London: Conway Maritime Press. ISBN 0-85177-593-4.
- Hodgson, Bill. "The Sinking of U-331". Aeroplane Monthly, March 1994, Vol 22 No 3. pp. 11–14.
