= Duchess (drink) =

Georgian carbonated soft drink

Duchess დუშესი Դքսուհի Дюшес Düşes
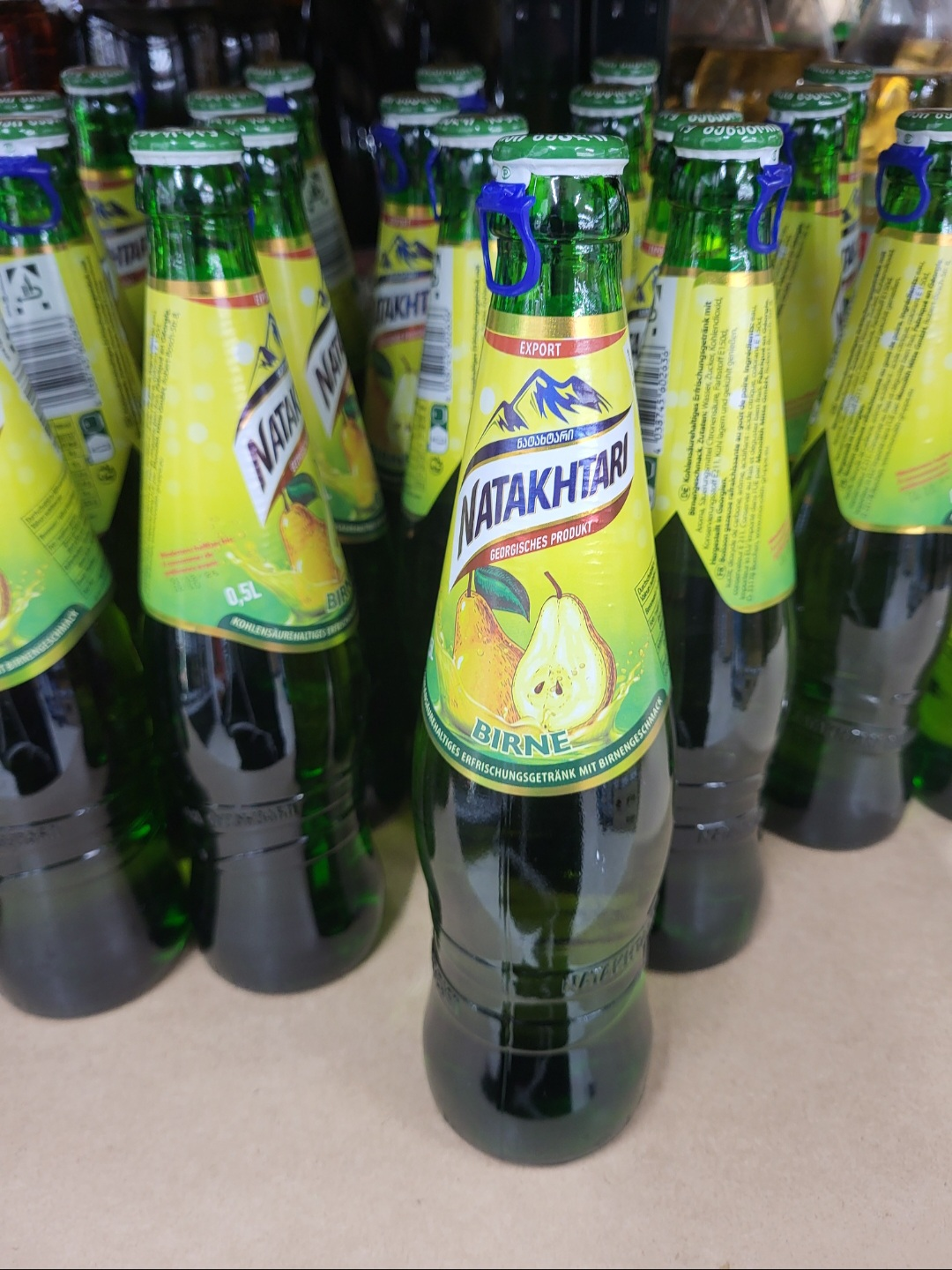
- Bottled Duchess by Natakhtari
- Type: Soft drink
- Origin: Georgia
- Introduced: 1887; 139 years ago
- Color: Light yellow
- Flavor: Pear
- Website: www.vniinapitkov.ru

Duchess (Georgian: დუშესი; Armenian: Դքսուհի; Russian: Дюшес; Azerbaijani: Düşes; also written Dushes) is a pear-flavored carbonated soft drink originating from Georgia and widely popular across the former Soviet Union.

It is named after the French Duchesse d'Angoulême pear cultivar and was first developed in the late 19th century by Georgian pharmacist Mitrofan Lagidze, besides many other soft drinks of his, who replaced artificial essences with natural fruit syrups. During the Soviet Union, the recipe was standardized as a mass-produced beverage across the entire country.

== History ==
The original recipe for the drink was first developed by Mitrofan Lagidze, who, in 1887, wanted to experiment with the usage of natural syrups instead of imported flavored essences in making lemonade and followed it up in 1900 by opening the Lagidze Brothers plant in Kutaisi. One of those lemonades included what would become Duchess in the Soviet Union. During the 1930s, the recipe was further developed and eventually ended up becoming the most widely available fruit soda in the USSR, being sold everywhere and also becoming a government staple.

== Availability ==
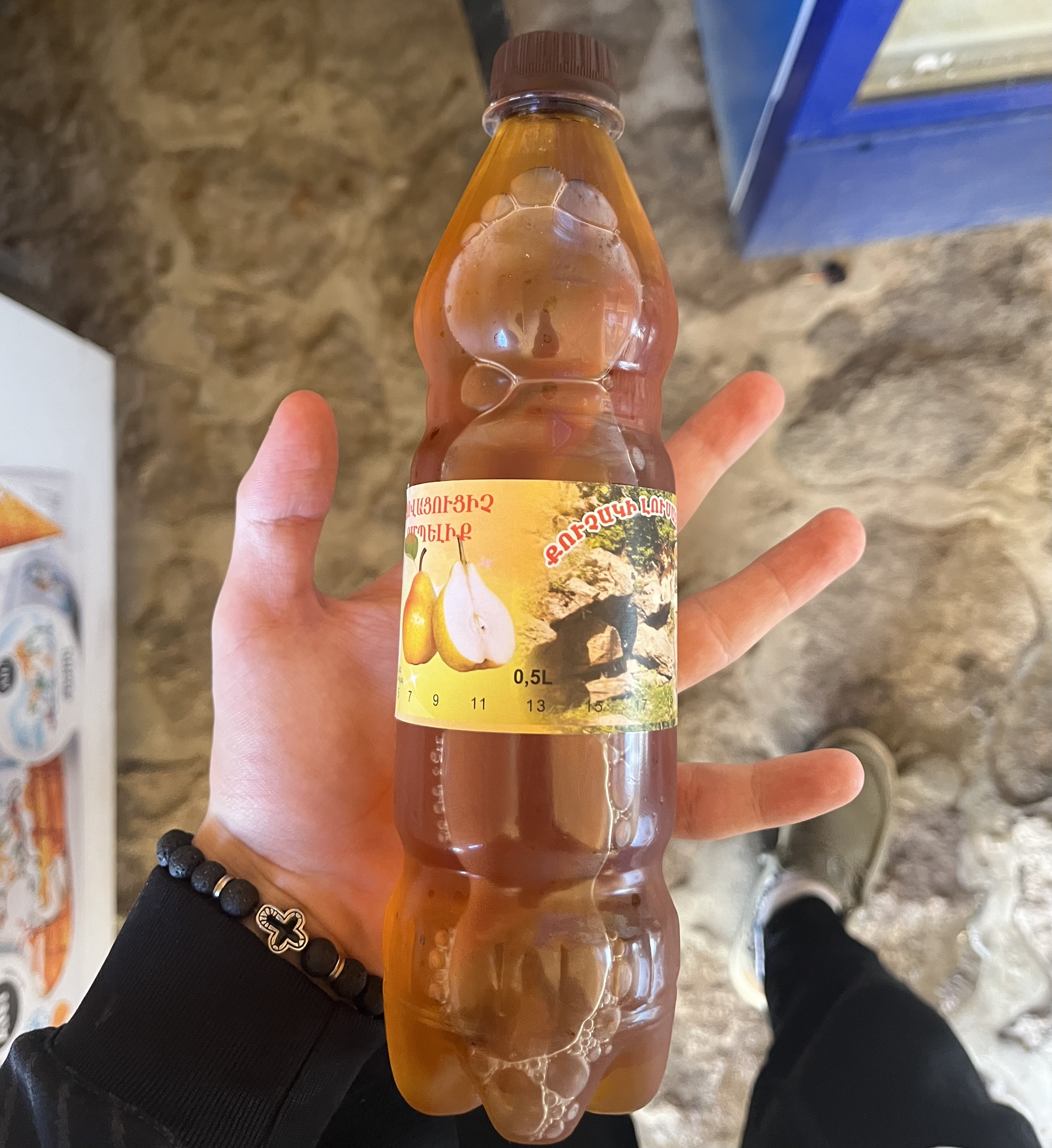
Armenian carbonated pear soda

In Georgia, Armenia, Russia and Azerbaijan, multiple brands such as Natakhtari, Noy, Chernogolovka or Gülüstan produce Duchess locally, with foreign exports rising.

Fanta has also been selling pear-flavoured Fanta in countries such as Russia, Armenia, or Azerbaijan, where Duchess is popular, since 2019.

== See also ==
- Tarkhuna
- Lagidze water
