= Dutchess (disambiguation) =

Dutchess may refer to:

- Dutchess County, New York, USA
  - Dutchess Community College
  - Dutchess County Airport
  - Dutchess Stadium
  - Dutchess Turnpike, an early route approximating to U.S. Route 44 in New York
  - Dutchess Mall
- The Dutchess, the debut studio album by American recording artist Fergie

== Similar spelling ==
- Duchess, a woman with status equivalent to a duke
- Duchess (disambiguation)
