= Duchess (chess variant) =

2–6 player chess variant

Duchess is a chess variant for 2+ players, created by Alan Blair and John Kramer in 1985 with the help of Mike Blair and Warwick Hooke. It supports 2-6 players in either free-for-all, 2v2, or 3v3 formats, and has largely the same rules as standard chess. Notable inclusions are three fairy chess pieces and a central "vortex" space being used for promotion rather than the back rank.

== Board layout ==
A Duchess board consists of six 5x4 flaps surrounding a larger hexagonal section, which itself consists of two rings of squares (5-to-a-side, then 3-to-a-side) surrounding the central hexagonal "vortex" space. Only the flaps for which there is a corresponding color in play are used in a game; the rest are either removed or simply ignored.

Both the central vortex and the corners of each petal are black.

Each color has the same starting positions, on the back three rows of its corresponding flap. The starting flap for each color may vary, but two colors on the same team cannot be on adjacent flaps.

== Playing pieces ==
The pieces of Duchess are sorted into two teams, with red, yellow and magenta making up the first, and blue, green and cyan the second. Along with the standard chess pieces, Duchess includes two common Fairy Chess pieces. These are the Princess (chess) and the Empress (chess). In addition, it introduces a new piece called the Wizard, which allow a piece in the surrounding 8 squares (or itself) to teleport to an unoccupied square around a Wizard of the same team. This is considered to be the teleported piece utilizing the Wizard, rather than vice versa; Red pieces may use yellow and magenta Wizards to move themselves on Red's turn, but neither Yellow nor Magenta's Wizard can force Red's pieces to move. The Wizard of a player who has been placed in checkmate can still be used as an origin or destination for a teleportation.

== Checkmate and draws ==
In team play, if a player is put into checkmate, rather than the game ending, their turn is skipped until they are released from checkmate; their king may never be captured. Teammates are not obligated to remove allies from check or checkmate in the same way they are obligated to remove themselves from check. Only when all players on a team are in checkmate does the game end, with the opposing team declared the victor. In the case of a free-for-all game, the victor is the one to the right of the first to be checkmated, not the player to initiate the checkmate. Draws only occur in the case of mutual agreement.
