= Hans-Diedrich von Tiesenhausen =

German naval commander (1913–2000)

- Born: 22 February 1913; Riga, Russian Empire
- Died: 17 August 2000 (aged 87); Vancouver, British Columbia, Canada
- Relatives: Gerhard von Tiesenhausen (father)
- Military career
- Allegiance: Nazi Germany
- Branch: Kriegsmarine
- Service years: 1934–45
- Rank: Kapitänleutnant
- Commands: U-331
- Conflicts: World War II: Battle of the Atlantic; Mediterranean U-boat Campaign (World War II)
- Awards: Knight's Cross of the Iron Cross

Hans-Diedrich von Tiesenhausen (22 February 1913 – 17 August 2000) was a German naval commander during World War II. He was a recipient of the Knight's Cross of the Iron Cross of Nazi Germany.

== Career ==
Von Tiesenhausen was born on 22 February 1913 in Riga, at the time part of the Russian Empire (now Latvia), as a member of the Baltic German nobility family Tiesenhausen and son of Gerhard von Tiesenhausen. He joined the Reichsmarine (renamed the Kriegsmarine on 1 June 1935) on 8 April 1934. After undergoing basic military training in the ship core division of the Baltic Sea in Stralsund, he was transferred to the training ship Gorch Fock on 15 June 1934. Promoted lieutenant, von Tiesenhausen served on the cruiser Nürnberg, taking part in security patrols in Spanish waters in 1937. He then served with the 5th Naval Artillery Battalion in Pillau.

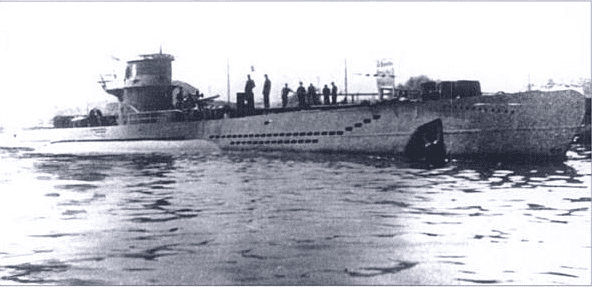
U-331

=== U-Boats ===
Promoted to Oberleutnant zur See on 1 April 1939, he reported for submarine training in October 1939, after the outbreak of World War II. On graduation, from December 1939 he served as second watch officer on U-23, commanded by Otto Kretschmer. During his tour on U-23, he completed three successful patrols, during which the boat sank five ships for a total of 27,000 tons, as well as one destroyer. His fourth patrol on U-23 was under the command of Commander Beduhn, after which he was posted as first watch officer to the new U-93, commanded by Claus Korth.

=== U-331 ===
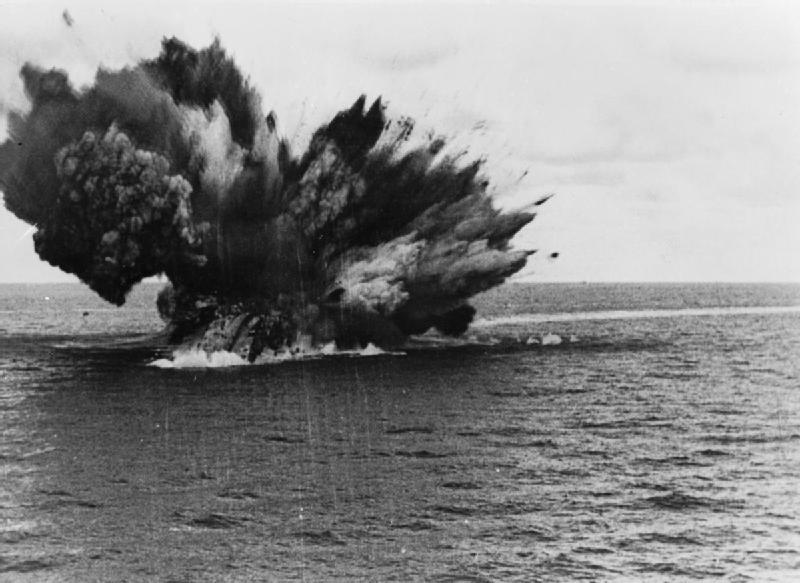
HMS Barham exploding, 25 November 1941.

On 31 March 1941, he was given command of a new Type VIIC boat, U-331. The boat left Kiel on 2 July 1941, patrolling out into the mid-Atlantic Ocean as far as the Azores, before arriving at Lorient, France on 19 August.

After sailing from Lorient on 24 September, and making the difficult passage into the Mediterranean Sea, on 10 October the boat engaged three British tank landing craft off Sidi Barrani, Egypt. Inflicting slight damage with her deck gun, the attack was broken off after U-331 was hit by 40 mm shells, which wounded two men (one fatally) and damaged the conning tower. The following day the boat arrived at Salamis, Greece.

Departing Salamis on 12 November 1941, the boat was tasked with landing seven men of the Lehrregiment Brandenburg east of Ras Gibeisa, on a mission to blow up a railway line near the Egyptian coast. After completing this important task, Von Tiesenhausen was given free movement to patrol and attack Allied targets along the Egyptian coast. On 25 November 1941, north of Sidi Barrani, U-331 fired three torpedoes into the British Queen Elizabeth-class battleship HMS Barham. As the ship rolled over, her magazines exploded and she quickly sank with the loss of 861 men, while 395 were rescued. U-331 returned to Salamis on 3 December, where Von Tiesenhausen was promoted to Kapitänleutnant and awarded the Knight's Cross of the Iron Cross.

Her next five patrols passed without incident or further sinkings, as she patrolled from Salamis to La Spezia, Italy. On her tenth patrol, U-331 was sunk on 17 November 1942, north of Algiers, during "Operation Torch". She had been badly damaged after being attacked by a Lockheed Hudson bomber and signalled surrender, but was attacked and sunk by a Fairey Albacore torpedo-bomber from the British aircraft carrier HMS Formidable. Of her crew 32 were killed and 17 survived, including von Tiesenhausen.

== Later life ==
As a prisoner of war, Von Tiesenhausen was initially moved to England, he then spent the rest of the war as a POW in Canada, until his release in 1947.

Returning to West Germany, he worked as a joiner, but in late 1951 he returned to Vancouver, British Columbia, Canada, where he became an interior architect and a nature photographer.

== Awards ==
- Dienstauszeichnung 4th Class (8 April 1938)
- The Return of Memel Commemorative Medal (25 June 1940)
- The Return of Sudetenland Commemorative Medal of 1 October 1938 (6 September 1940)
- Iron Cross (1939)
  - 2nd Class (30 January 1940)
  - 1st Class (7 December 1941)
- Medaglia di bronzo al Valore Militare (November 1941)
- Medaglia d'Argento al Valor Militare (25 March 1942)
- U-boat War Badge (1939) (26 February 1942)
- Knight's Cross of the Iron Cross on 27 January 1942 as Kapitänleutnant and commander of U-331

== Combat career ==
Date	U-boat	Name of Ship	Nationality	Tonnage	Fate
10 October 1941	U-331	HMS TLC-18	Royal Navy	372	Damaged
25 November 1941	U-331	HMS Barham	Royal Navy	31,100	Sunk
9 November 1942	U-331	USS Leedstown	United States Navy	9,135	Sunk
