= HMS Barham (04) =

Queen Elizabeth-class battleship

Coordinates: 32°34′N 26°24′E

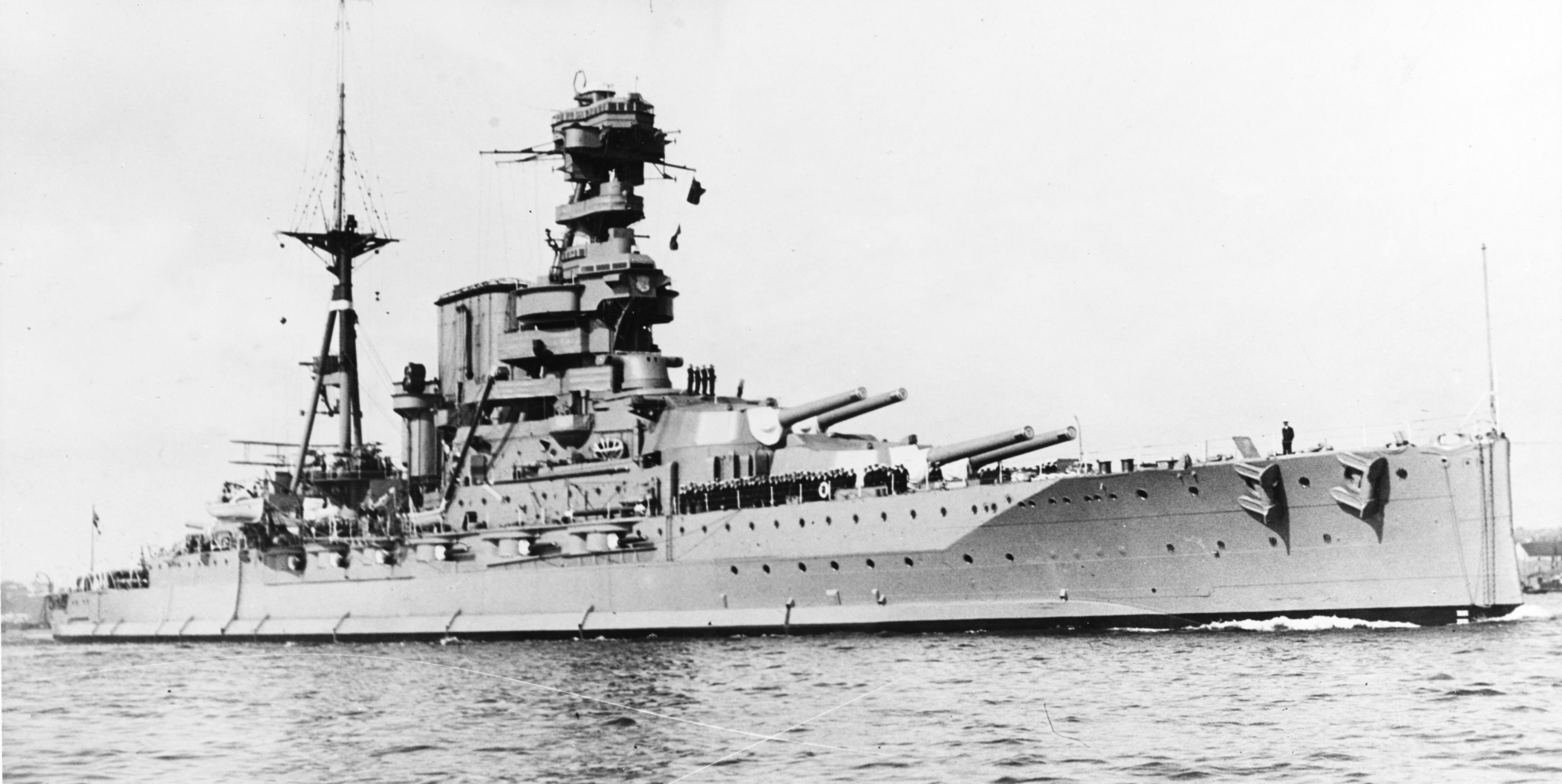
- Barham underway at low speed, mid-1930s

History

United Kingdom
- Name: Barham
- Namesake: Admiral Charles Middleton, 1st Baron Barham
- Builder: John Brown & Company, Clydebank
- Yard number: 424
- Laid down: 24 February 1913
- Launched: 31 December 1914
- Commissioned: 19 October 1915
- Identification: Pennant number: 97 (1914); 10 (Jan 18); 34 (Apr 18); 04 (Nov 19)
- Fate: Sunk near Egypt, 25 November 1941

General characteristics (as built)
- Class & type: Queen Elizabeth-class battleship
- Displacement: 32,590 long tons (33,113 t)
- Length: 643 ft 9 in (196.2 m)
- Beam: 90 ft 7 in (27.6 m)
- Draught: 33 ft (10.1 m)
- Installed power: 24 Yarrow boilers; 56,000 shp (42,000 kW)
- Propulsion: 4 shafts; 2 steam turbine sets
- Speed: 24 knots (44 km/h; 28 mph)
- Range: 5,000 nmi (9,260 km; 5,750 mi) at 12 knots (22 km/h; 14 mph)
- Complement: 1,016 (1916)
- Armament: 4 × twin 15-inch (381 mm) guns; 14 × single 6-inch (152 mm) guns; 2 × single 3-inch (76 mm) 20 cwt AA guns; 4 × 21-inch (533 mm) torpedo tubes
- Armour: Waterline belt: 13 in (330 mm); Deck: 1–3 in (25–76 mm); Barbettes: 7–10 in (178–254 mm); Gun turrets: 11–13 in (279–330 mm); Conning tower: 13 in (330 mm)

HMS Barham was one of five Queen Elizabeth-class battleships built for the Royal Navy during the early 1910s. Completed in 1915, she was often used as a flagship and participated in the Battle of Jutland during the First World War as part of the Grand Fleet. For the rest of the war, except for the inconclusive action of 19 August 1916, her service generally consisted of routine patrols and training in the North Sea.

During the 1920s and 1930s, the ship was assigned to the Atlantic, Mediterranean, and Home Fleets. Barham played a minor role in quelling the 1929 Palestine riots and the 1936–1939 Arab revolt in Palestine. The ship was in the Mediterranean when the Second World War began in September 1939, on her voyage home three months later, she accidentally collided with and sank one of her escorting destroyers, HMS Duchess.

She participated in the Battle of Dakar in mid-1940, where she damaged a Vichy French battleship and was slightly damaged in return. Barham was then transferred to the Mediterranean Fleet, where she covered multiple Malta convoys. She helped to sink an Italian heavy cruiser and a destroyer during the Battle of Cape Matapan in March 1941 and was damaged by German aircraft two months later during the evacuation of Crete. Barham was sunk off the Egyptian coast that November by the German submarine U-331 with the loss of 862 crewmen, approximately two thirds of her crew.

== Design and description ==
The Queen Elizabeth-class ships were designed to form a fast squadron for the fleet that was intended to operate against the leading ships of the opposing battleline. This required maximum offensive power and a speed several knots faster than any other battleship to allow them to defeat any type of ship.

Barham had a length overall of 643 feet 9 inches (196.2 m), a beam of 90 feet 7 inches (27.6 m) and a deep draught of 33 feet (10.1 m). She had a normal displacement of 32,590 long tons (33,113 t) and displaced 33,260 long tons (33,794 t) at deep load. She was powered by two sets of Brown-Curtis steam turbines, each driving two shafts using steam from 24 Yarrow boilers. The turbines were rated at 75,000 shaft horsepower (56,000 kW) and intended to reach a maximum speed of 25 knots (46.3 km/h; 28.8 mph). During her abbreviated sea trials on 6 July 1916, Barham only reached a mean top speed of 23.91 knots (44.28 km/h; 27.52 mph). The ship had a range of 5,000 nautical miles (9,260 km; 5,754 mi) at a cruising speed of 12 knots (22.2 km/h; 13.8 mph). Her crew numbered 1,016 officers and ratings in 1916.

=== Armament and fire-control ===
The Queen Elizabeth class was equipped with eight breech-loading (BL) 15-inch (381 mm) Mk I guns in four twin-gun turrets, in two superfiring pairs fore and aft of the superstructure, designated 'A', 'B', 'X', and 'Y' from front to rear. Twelve of the fourteen BL 6-inch (152 mm) Mk XII guns were mounted in casemates along the broadside of the vessel amidships; the remaining pair were mounted on the forecastle deck near the aft funnel and were protected by gun shields. The anti-aircraft (AA) armament was composed of two quick-firing (QF) 3-inch (76 mm) 20 cwt Mk I (Note: "Cwt" is the abbreviation for hundredweight, 20 cwt referring to the weight of the gun.) guns. The ships were fitted with four submerged 21-inch (533 mm) torpedo tubes, two on each broadside.

Barham was completed with two fire-control directors fitted with 15-foot (4.6 m) rangefinders. One was mounted above the conning tower, protected by an armoured hood, and the other was in the spotting top above the tripod mast. Each turret was also fitted with a 15-foot rangefinder. The main armament could be controlled by 'B' turret as well. The secondary armament was primarily controlled by directors mounted on each side of the compass platform on the foremast once they were fitted in July 1917.

=== Protection and aircraft ===
The waterline belt of the Queen Elizabeth class consisted of Krupp cemented armour (KC) that was 13 inches (330 mm) thick over the ships' vitals. The gun turrets were protected by 11 to 13 inches (279 to 330 mm) of KC armour and were supported by barbettes 7–10 inches (178–254 mm) thick. The ships had multiple armoured decks that ranged from 1 to 3 inches (25 to 76 mm) in thickness. The main conning tower was protected by 13 inches (330 mm) of armour. After the Battle of Jutland, 1 inch (25 mm) of high-tensile steel was added to the main deck over the magazines and additional anti-flash equipment was added in the magazines.

The ship was fitted with flying-off platforms mounted on the roofs of 'B' and 'X' turrets in 1918, from which fighters and reconnaissance aircraft could launch. During her early-1930s refit, the platforms were removed from the turrets and a retractable catapult was installed on the roof of 'X' turret, along with a crane to recover a floatplane. This was initially a Fairey IIIF until it was replaced by a Fairey Swordfish in 1938.

=== Major alterations ===
Barham received a series of minor refits during the 1920s. In 1921–1922, 30-foot (9.1 m) rangefinders replaced the smaller ones in 'B' and 'X' turrets. Two years later, her anti-aircraft defences were upgraded when the original three-inch AA guns were replaced with a pair of QF four-inch (102 mm) Mk V AA guns between November 1924 and January 1925 and another pair of four-inch AA guns were added from October to November later that year. To control these guns a temporary High-Angle Control Position was mounted above the torpedo-control tower aft. This was replaced by a torpedo rangefinder in early 1928 when the permanent position was installed in the remodelled spotting top.

The ship was extensively refitted between January 1931 and January 1934 at a cost of £424,000. During this refit, the aft superstructure was rebuilt and the torpedo-control tower and its rangefinder were removed, together with the aft set of torpedo tubes. The fore funnel was trunked into the aft funnel to reduce smoke in the spotting top. A High-Angle Control System (HACS) Mk I director were added to the roof of the spotting top and the mainmast was reconstructed as a tripod to support the weight of a second HACS director. A pair of octuple mounts for 2-pounder (40 mm (1.6 in)) Mk VIII "pom-pom" anti-aircraft guns were added abreast the funnel and two positions for their directors were added on new platforms abreast and below the spotting top. In addition, a pair of quadruple mounts for Vickers 0.5 in (12.7 mm) AA machine guns were added abreast the conning tower.

The turret roofs were reinforced to a thickness of 5 inches (127 mm) and the armour added over the magazines after Jutland was replaced by 4 inches of Krupp non-cemented armour, the first British battleship to receive such. In addition, the rear of the six-inch gun casemates was enclosed by a 1.5-inch (38 mm) bulkhead. Underwater protection was improved by the addition of torpedo bulges. They were designed to reduce the effect of torpedo detonations and improve stability at the cost of widening the ship's beam by almost 14 feet (4.3 m) to 104 feet (31.7 m), and reduced her draught to 32 feet 6 inches (9.9 m). This increased her metacentric height to about 7 feet (2.1 m) at deep load, despite the increase in her deep displacement to 35,970 long tons (36,550 t). When Barham conducted her sea trials on 20 November 1933, her speed was reduced to 22.5 knots (41.7 km/h; 25.9 mph) from 65,655 shp (48,959 kW).

Later alterations included replacing the single mounts of the AA guns with twin mounts for the QF 4-inch Mark XVI gun, removal of the forward submerged torpedo tubes and the high-angle rangefinder in March–May 1938. In addition the torpedo-control tower aft was replaced by an air-defence position during that same refit. While under repair in December 1939 – March 1940, a 20-barrel Unrotated projectile (UP) rocket launcher was installed on the roof of 'B' turret and her HACS Mk I directors were replaced with Mk III models. The following year the UP mount was replaced by a pair of quadruple Vickers 0.5-inch machine gun mounts and another pair of eight-barreled "pom-pom" mounts were added abreast her conning tower.

== Construction and career ==
The Queen Elizabeth class was ordered as part of the 1912 Naval Programme and the contract for Barham was awarded to John Brown & Company. The ship, named after Admiral Charles Middleton, 1st Baron Barham, was laid down at their Clydebank shipyard on 24 February 1913 and launched on 31 December 1914. (Note: Curiously, Preston, Silverstone, and Parkes all give a launch date of 31 October; however contemporary reference books such as Jane's Fighting Ships and other modern sources such as Lenton, Colledge and http://clydeships.co.uk agree with the 31 December 1914 date.) Barham cost a total of £2,470,113. She was completed for trials on 19 August 1915 which took until the end of September to finish under the command of Captain Arthur Craig Waller. The following day, 1 October, Rear-Admiral Hugh Evan-Thomas, commander of the 5th Battle Squadron, hoisted his flag aboard his new flagship.

=== First World War ===
Barham joined the Grand Fleet at Scapa Flow the next day and participated in a fleet training operation west of Orkney during 2–5 November. During another training exercise in early December, the ship was accidentally rammed by her sister ship Warspite on 3 December. After temporary repairs at Scapa, Barham was sent to Cromarty Firth for more permanent repairs in the floating dry dock there that lasted until 23 December.

The Grand Fleet departed for a cruise in the North Sea on 26 February 1916; Admiral Sir John Jellicoe, commander of the Grand Fleet, had intended to use the Harwich Force to sweep the Heligoland Bight, but bad weather prevented operations in the southern North Sea. As a result, the operation was confined to the northern end of the sea. Another sweep began on 6 March, but had to be abandoned the following day as the weather grew too severe for the escorting destroyers. On the night of 25 March, Barham and the rest of the fleet sailed from Scapa Flow to support Vice-Admiral David Beatty's battlecruisers and other light forces raiding the German Zeppelin base at Tondern. By the time the Grand Fleet approached the area on 26 March, the British and German forces had already disengaged and a strong gale threatened the light craft, so the fleet was ordered to return to base. On 21 April, the Grand Fleet conducted a demonstration off Horns Reef to distract the Germans while the Russian Navy relaid its defensive minefields in the Baltic Sea. The fleet returned to Scapa Flow on 24 April and refuelled before proceeding south in response to intelligence reports that the Germans were about to launch a raid on Lowestoft. The 5th Battle Squadron preceded the rest of the Grand Fleet to reinforce Beatty's battlecruiser fleet, but the British arrived in the area after the Germans had withdrawn. On 2–4 May, the fleet conducted another demonstration off Horns Reef to keep German attention focused on the North Sea. On 21 May, the 5th Battle Squadron was attached to Beatty while his 3rd Battlecruiser Squadron was detached for gunnery training and arrived at Rosyth the following day.

==== Battle of Jutland ====
Maps showing the manoeuvres of the British (blue) and German (red) fleets on 31 May – 1 June 1916

In an attempt to lure out and destroy a portion of the Grand Fleet, the High Seas Fleet, composed of 16 dreadnoughts, 6 pre-dreadnoughts, 6 light cruisers, and 31 torpedo boats, departed the Jade early on the morning of 31 May. The fleet sailed in concert with Rear Admiral Franz von Hipper's five battlecruisers and supporting cruisers and torpedo boats. The Royal Navy's Room 40 had intercepted and decrypted German radio traffic containing plans of the operation. In response the Admiralty ordered the Grand Fleet, totalling some 28 dreadnoughts and 9 battlecruisers, to sortie the night before to cut off and destroy the High Seas Fleet. Barham slipped her mooring at 22:08 and was followed by the rest of Beatty's ships. (Note: The times used in this section are in UT, one hour behind CET, which is often used in German works.)

When dawn broke Beatty ordered his forces into cruising formation with the 5th Battle Squadron trailing his battle cruisers by five nautical miles (9.3 km; 5.8 mi). At 14:15, Beatty ordered a turn north by east to rendezvous with the Grand Fleet. Shortly before the turn, one of his escorting light cruisers, Galatea spotted smoke on the horizon and continued on her course to investigate. Ten minutes later, the ship radioed "Two cruisers, probably hostile, in sight..." They were actually two German destroyers that had stopped to check a Danish merchant ship's papers. At 14:32, Beatty ordered a course change to south-southeast in response to the spot report. Barham's signallers were unable to read the signal and her officer of the watch presumed that it was the expected point zigzag to the left of the base course and signalled that course change to the rest of the squadron. After several minutes it became apparent that the squadron was not conforming to Beatty's other ships, but Evan-Thomas refused to change course until clear instructions had been received despite entreaties from the Barham's captain. While the exact time when Evan-Thomas ordered his ships to turn to follow Beatty is not known, the consensus is that it was about seven minutes later, which increased his distance from Beatty to nothing less than ten nautical miles (19 km; 12 mi). (Note: Gordon devotes a whole chapter to this issue as the various accounts cannot be reconciled with the surviving records.)

Hipper's battlecruisers spotted the Battlecruiser Fleet to their west at 15:20, but Beatty's ships did not see the Germans to their east until 15:30. Two minutes later, Beatty ordered a course change to east-southeast, positioning the British ships to cut off the German's line of retreat, and signalled action stations. Hipper ordered his ships to turn to starboard, away from the British, to assume a south-easterly course, and reduced speed to 18 knots (33 km/h; 21 mph) to allow three light cruisers of the 2nd Scouting Group to catch up. With this turn, Hipper was falling back on the High Seas Fleet, 60 miles (97 km) behind him. Beatty then altered course to the east, as he was still too far north to cut Hipper off. This was later characterised as the "Run to the South" as Beatty changed course to steer east-southeast at 15:45, now paralleling Hipper's course less than 18,000 yards (16,000 m) away. By this time the 5th Battle Squadron was about seven point five nautical miles (13.9 km; 8.6 mi) northwest of Beatty. The Germans opened fire first at 15:48, followed by the British battlecruisers.

The light cruisers of the 2nd Scouting Group were the first German ships visible to Evan-Thomas's ships and Barham opened fire on them at 15:58 until the cruisers disappeared into their own smoke screen at around 16:05. About three minutes later, the ship opened fire on the battlecruiser SMS Von der Tann at a range of about 23,000 yards (21,000 m). A minute later she scored one hit on the German ship's stern before she was ordered to switch targets to the battlecruiser SMS Moltke, together with her sister Valiant. The shell struck just below the waterline and burst on impact with the belt armour. The impact was right on the joints between several armour plates and drove them inwards and destroyed part of the hull behind them. The damage allowed over 1,000 long tons (1,016 t) of water to flood the stern and nearly knocked out the ship's steering gear. Between them, Barham and Valiant hit Moltke four times from 16:16 to 16:26, but only one of those hits can be attributed to Valiant. Two of the others detonated upon striking the waterline armour, but failed to penetrate. The impacts drove in the plates and fragments caused much flooding by damaging the surrounding structure. The last shell passed all the way through the ship without detonating; it struck and dislodged a 100-millimetre (3.9 in) armour plate on the waterline on the other side of the ship that caused also some flooding. Barham was herself was struck twice during the "Run to the South": the first was a 28.3-centimetre (11 in) shell from Von der Tann that failed to do any damage when it hit the waterline armour and the battlecruiser SMS Lützow fired a 30.5-centimetre (12 in) shell that detonated in the aft superstructure. This sent splinters in every direction and started a small fire, but otherwise did no significant damage.

At 16:30, the light cruiser Southampton, scouting in front of Beatty's ships, spotted the lead elements of the High Seas Fleet coming north at top speed. Three minutes later, she sighted the topmasts of Vice-Admiral Reinhard Scheer's battleships, but did not report this for another five minutes. Beatty continued south for another two minutes to confirm the sighting before ordering his force to turn north, towards the Grand Fleet in what came to be known as the "Run to the North". His order only applied to his own forces; the 5th Battle Squadron continued south until after it passed Beatty heading northwestwards at 16:51. Beatty then ordered Evan-Thomas to turn his ships in succession to follow the battlecruisers three minutes later. This meant that they were some 4,000 yards (3,700 m) closer to the rapidly advancing High Sea Fleet. And now within range of the battleships of the 3rd Squadron which opened fire on the 5th Battle Squadron as they made their turn. (Note: This is another problematic issue in which sources differ to which Gordon devotes an entire chapter.)

Evan-Thomas continued his turn until his ships were steering due north, which interposed the 5th Battle Squadron between Hipper's battlecruisers, which had reversed course around 16:48 to follow Beatty north, and Beatty's ships. While making the turn, Barham was struck by two 30.5-centimetre shells beginning at 16:58, probably from the battlecruiser SMS Derfflinger. The first of these struck the ship's upper deck before detonating upon striking the main deck above the medical store compartment, which was completely burnt out. The detonation blew a 7-by-7-foot (2.1 by 2.1 m) hole in the main deck, sent fragments through the middle and lower decks and burned out the casemate for starboard No. 2 six-inch gun. Three minutes later another shell hit the aft superstructure, severing the antenna cables of the main wireless station. One fragment ricocheted off the upper deck and through the side plating on the opposite side of the ship. Either the first or the fourth of these shells destroyed the ship's sickbay, killing the staff and all of its patients, including eight ship's boys. Barham returned fire at the battlecruisers at 17:02, together with Valiant, the two northernmost of Evan-Thomas's ships, and the two of them made three hits on the battlecruiser SMS Seydlitz and Lützow between 17:06 and 17:13 while Barham was hit twice more by Derfflinger; although neither of the hits did any significant damage. In contrast, the hit on Lützow flooded a 15-centimetre (5.9 in) magazine and the hits on Seydlitz blew a 10-by-13-foot (3.0 by 4.0 m) hole in the side of her bow. Fragments from this hit caused flooding that spread throughout the bow, while the ship's speed caused water to enter directly through the hole in the side. Other fragments from the second hit caused damage that allowed the water to spread even further. These two hits were ultimately responsible for the massive flooding that nearly sank Seydlitz after the battle. The third shell detonated on the face of the starboard wing turret, although some fragments entered the turret and caused minor damage.

Beatty in the meantime had turned further west to open up the range between his battered battlecruisers and the Germans. At 17:45 he turned eastwards to take his position in front of the Grand Fleet and re-engage Hipper's ships. This meant that the 5th Battle Squadron and the light cruisers were the sole targets available for the German ships until after his turn, although the worsening visibility hampered both sides' shooting. Barham was not hit during this time and she and Valiant, later joined by their sister Warspite, continued to fire at Hipper's 1st Scouting Group until 18:02 when Valiant lost sight of the Germans. They hit Lützow, Derfflinger and Seydlitz three times each between 17:19 and about 18:05. Lützow was only slightly damaged by these hits, which essentially only knocked out the primary and back-up wireless rooms while the shells that hit Derfflinger hit the side of the ship's bow, knocking off several armour plates, while fragments opened holes that ultimately allowed roughly 2,000 tonnes (1,968 long tons) of water to enter the bow. One of these hits also started several major fires inside the hull. The hits on Seydlitz mostly opened up more holes that facilitated the flooding.

Hipper turned his ships southward around 18:05 to fall back upon Scheer's advancing battleships and then reversed course five minutes later. Evan-Thomas turned northeast at around 18:06 and then made a slow turn to the southeast once he spotted the Grand Fleet. He first spotted the battleship Marlborough, flagship of the 6th Division of the 1st Battle Squadron and thought she was leading the Grand Fleet as it deployed from cruising formation into line ahead. At 18:17 he realised that Marlborough was actually at the rear of the formation and he ordered a turn to the north to bring his squadron into line behind the Grand Fleet. This took some time and his ships had to slow down to 12–18 knots (22–33 km/h; 14–21 mph) to avoid overrunning the 6th Division and blocking its fire. The 5th Battle Squadron concentrated their fire on the German battleships after losing sight of the battlecruisers, with Barham opening fire at 18:14. No hits were observed and the ships stopped firing after making their turn north, but Barham opened fire for a short time when they fell in line with the Grand Fleet a few minutes later, probably without making any hits.

Barham fired 337 fifteen-inch shells and 25 six-inch shells during the battle. The number of hits cannot be confirmed, but it is believed that she and Valiant made 23 or 24 hits between them, making them two of the most accurate warships in the British fleet. She was hit six times during the battle, five times by 30.5 cm shells and once by a 28.3 cm shell, suffering casualties of 26 killed and 46 wounded.

==== Subsequent activity ====
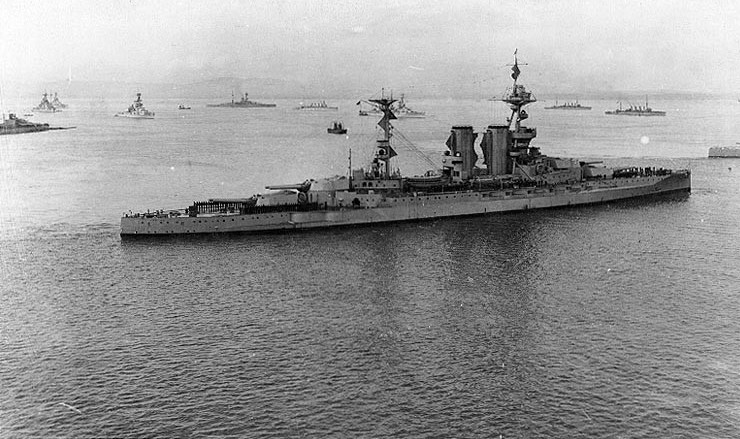
Aerial view of Barham in Scapa Flow, 1917

Following Jutland, Barham was under repair until 5 July 1916. On the evening of 18 August, the Grand Fleet put to sea in response to a message deciphered by Room 40 that indicated that the High Seas Fleet, minus II Squadron, would be leaving harbour that night. The German objective was to bombard Sunderland on 19 August, based on extensive reconnaissance conducted by Zeppelins and submarines. The Grand Fleet sailed with 29 dreadnoughts and 6 battlecruisers while the Germans mustered 18 dreadnoughts and 2 battlecruisers. Throughout the next day, Jellicoe and Vice-Admiral Reinhard Scheer, commander of the High Seas Fleet, received conflicting intelligence; after reaching the location in the North Sea where they expected to encounter the High Seas Fleet, the British turned north in the erroneous belief that they had entered a minefield. Scheer turned south again, then steered south-eastward to pursue a lone British battle squadron sighted by an airship, which was in fact the Harwich Force of cruisers and destroyers under Commodore Reginald Tyrwhitt. Realising their mistake, the Germans changed course for home. The only contact came in the evening when Tyrwhitt sighted the High Seas Fleet but was unable to achieve an advantageous attack position before dark, and broke off contact. The British and the German fleets returned home; the British lost two cruisers to submarine attacks, and one German dreadnought had been torpedoed. After returning to port, Jellicoe issued an order that prohibited risking the fleet in the southern half of the North Sea due to the overwhelming risk from mines and U-boats unless the odds of defeating the High Seas Fleet in a decisive engagement were favourable.

She was refitted at Cromarty between February and March 1917 and King George V inspected the ship on 22 June at Invergordon. Barham was refitted at Rosyth from 7–23 February 1918 and Waller was relieved by Captain Henry Buller on 18 April. The latter was succeeded by Captain Richard Horne on 1 October. She was present when the High Seas Fleet surrendered for internment on 21 November.

=== Between the wars ===
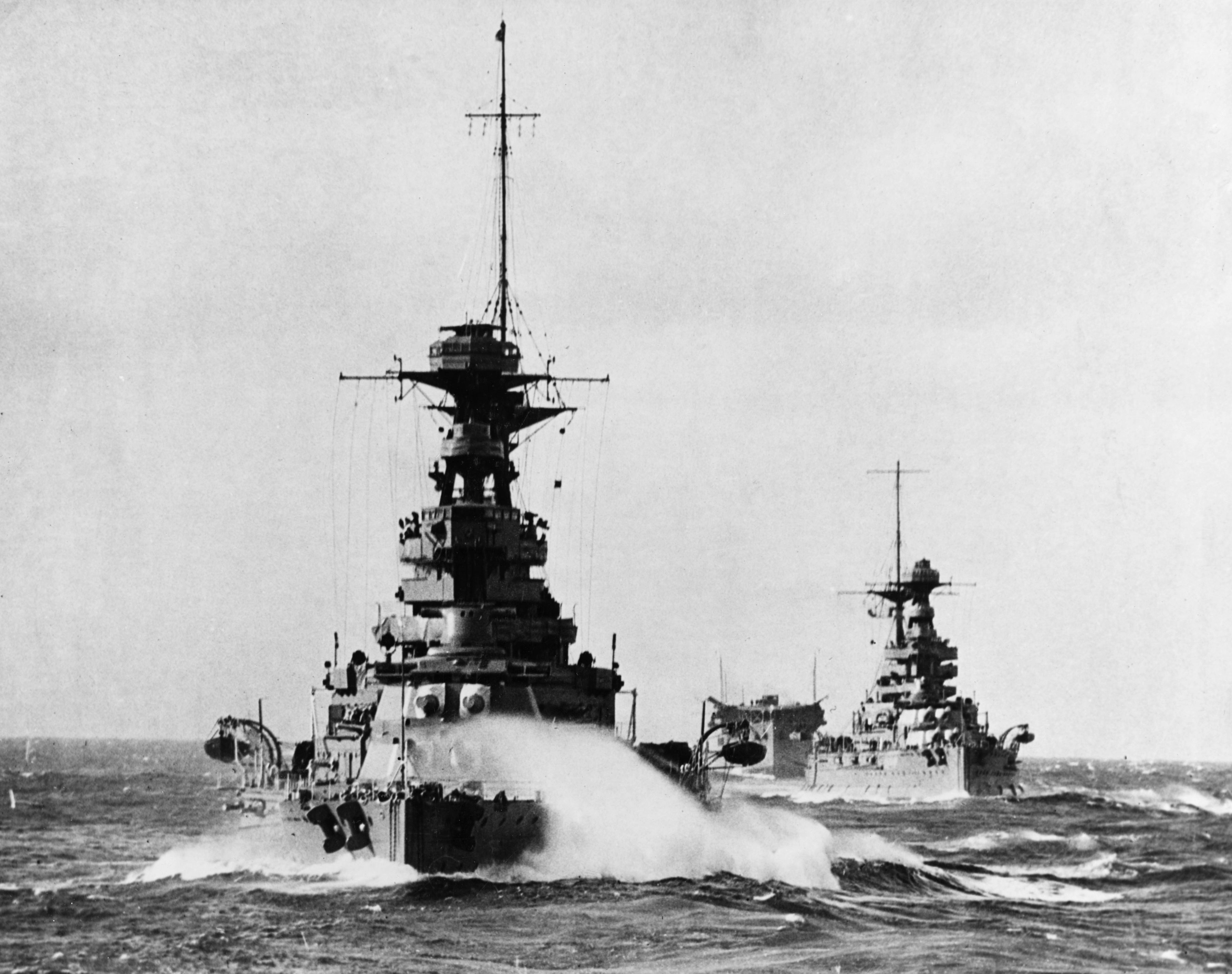
Barham leading Malaya and the aircraft carrier Argus in the late-1920s

Barham became flagship of the 1st Battle Squadron of the Atlantic Fleet in April 1919, and made a port visit to Cherbourg, France that month together with the rest of the squadron. Captain Robin Dalglish relieved Horne on 1 October 1920. She retained her position when the 1st and 2nd Battle Squadrons were merged in May 1921. Dalglish was relieved in his turn by Captain Percy Noble on 18 October 1922. Barham participated in the Fleet review on 26 July 1924 at Spithead. A few months later, now under the command of Captain Richard Hill, the ship again retained her position as the 1st Battle Squadron was split in two and the Queen Elizabeths of the new 1st Battle Squadron were transferred to the Mediterranean Fleet on 1 November 1924. On 14 October 1925, Captain Francis Marten relieved Hill, but he retained command only until 9 March 1926 when Captain Joseph Henley assumed command. Together with her sister Malaya, Barham was sent to Alexandria, Egypt, in May 1927 during a time of unrest. Now under the command of Captain Hubert Monroe and accompanied by the battleship Ramillies, she cruised along the coast of West Africa from December 1927 to February 1928. She became a private ship in January of that year and was refitted at Portsmouth Royal Dockyard in February–July. Shortly after her return to the Mediterranean, Barham again became flagship of the 1st Battle Squadron in September after her sister Warspite had to return home for repairs after running aground. Captain James Somerville relieved Monroe on 1 December and he was relieved in his turn on 16 March 1929 by Captain John C. Hamilton. The ship was relieved as flagship by Revenge in June and she was ordered to Palestine in August where her crew helped to suppress rioting in Haifa and also operated the Haifa-Jerusalem railroad. The ship was transferred to the 2nd Battle Squadron of the Atlantic Fleet in November 1929, and, together with Malaya, made a port visit to Trondheim, Norway in mid-1930 where they fired a salute to celebrate the birth of Princess Ragnhild on 9 June.

Between January 1931 and January 1934, Barham underwent a major refit. While Warspite, Valiant and Queen Elizabeth received what amounted to a complete reconstruction with new machinery and superstructures during the mid- to late-1930s, changes to Barham were relatively minor. Now under the command of Captain Richard Scott, Barham was assigned to the Home Fleet as the flagship of the 2nd Battle Squadron, and deployed to the West Indies in January–February 1935 for training. The ship participated in the Silver Jubilee Fleet Review for George V on 16 July at Spithead and was then transferred to the Mediterranean Fleet at the end of August. At that time, Captain Norman Wodehouse relieved Scott. She was briefly deployed to Haifa in May 1936 at the beginning of the Arab revolt in Palestine. Shortly afterwards, she was deployed to Gibraltar for several months after the beginning of the Spanish Civil War in July.

Barham served as the flagship of the 1st Battle Squadron from November 1936 to May 1937 and participated in the Coronation Fleet Review for King George VI on 19 May at Spithead. She became the flagship of the Mediterranean Fleet on 9 June until relieved by Warspite on 8 February 1938. Captain Henry Horan assumed command on 28 July 1937, although he only remained in command until 22 April 1938 when he was relieved by Captain Algernon Willis. The ship resumed her former role as flagship of the 1st Battle Squadron in February 1938 while undergoing a refit at Portsmouth that lasted until May. Willis was relieved by Captain Thomas Walker on 31 January 1939. During a port visit to Corfu in July, the ship was visited by King George II of Greece.

=== Second World War ===
Barham remained part of the Mediterranean Fleet at the outbreak of the Second World War in September 1939. She became a private ship on 1 December and departed Alexandria to join the Home Fleet that same day. On 12 December, she accidentally rammed one of her escorts, the destroyer Duchess, in thick fog nine miles (14 km) west of the Mull of Kintyre. Duchess capsized and sank, with the loss of 124 of her crew.

Barham, the battlecruiser Repulse and the destroyers Fame, Icarus, Imogen, Isis and Nubian were on patrol off the Butt of Lewis to protect against a possible break-out into the Atlantic by German warships when they were spotted by the German submarine U-30, commanded by Fritz-Julius Lemp, on 28 December. Lemp fired four torpedoes at the two capital ships, and one struck Barham on her port side, adjacent to the shell rooms for 'A' and 'B' turrets. The anti-torpedo bulge was essentially destroyed adjacent to the strike, with four men killed and two wounded. Most of the adjacent compartments flooded and the ship took on a 7 degree list that was countered by transferring fuel oil to starboard. Barham's speed was initially reduced to 10 knots (19 km/h; 12 mph), but it was increased to 16 knots (30 km/h; 18 mph) about an hour and a half later and she was able to proceed under her own power to Birkenhead for repairs by Cammell Laird that lasted until April 1940.

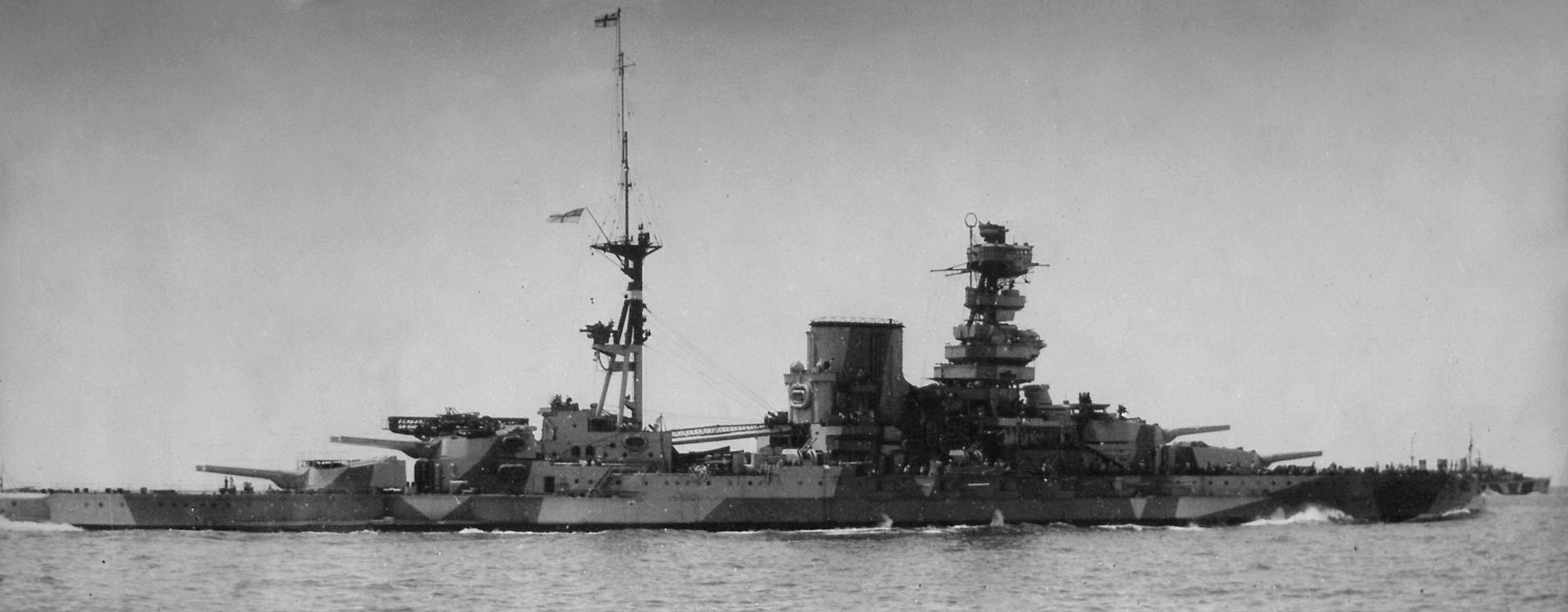
Barham in the Mediterranean

Captain Geoffrey Cooke assumed command on 25 March and the Navy took the opportunity to augment her light anti-aircraft armament and upgrade its directors. Barham played no role in the Norwegian Campaign although some of her crew and marines participated. In preparation for Operation Menace, a British naval attack on Dakar, Senegal, prior to a planned landing by the Free French, the ship was detached from the Home Fleet on 28 August and was assigned to Force M, the Royal Navy component of the operation. She departed Scapa Flow that day, escorted by four destroyers, and rendezvoused with the troop convoy en route to Gibraltar where she arrived on 2 September. She later became the flagship of Force M's commander, Vice-Admiral John Cunningham. Reinforced by the battleship Resolution and the aircraft carrier Ark Royal from Force H, Barham departed Gibraltar for Freetown, Sierra Leone, four days later.

==== Operation Menace ====
Force M departed Freetown for Dakar on 21 September and had arrived Dakar before dawn two days later. After Free French emissaries were either captured or driven off by the Vichy French, Cunningham ordered his ships to open fire. Barham's six-inch guns were the first to do so and fired at the French submarine Persée on the surface. They claimed at least one hit and the submarine was finished off by two of the escorting destroyers and the light cruiser Dragon. Her main guns targeted the port and the battleship Richelieu. Hindered by poor visibility, no significant damage was inflicted and Richelieu was not hit before the bombardment was called off after 20 minutes.

After the expiration of an ultimatum to surrender the following morning, the battleships engaged the port's 24-centimetre (9.4 in) coast-defence guns and Richelieu at 09:30. The latter was only struck by a single shell splinter before the Allies broke off the bombardment at 10:07, although she had hit Barham once with a 155 mm (6.1 in) shell that blew a hole 4 feet (1.2 m) in diameter in the bulge. The French destroyer Le Hardi sortied from the harbour at 12:00 to rescue a British pilot in the water, but was engaged at 12:53 by the battleships at a range of 12,000 yards (11,000 m). The ship was not hit, but was forced to return to port under the cover of a heavy smoke screen. The British battleships then switched targets to bombard the harbour and Richelieu. They set several merchant ships on fire, but again failed to hit the latter at a range of 17,000 yards (15,500 m) before breaking off fire at 13:20. During this time Barham was struck by a 24 cm shell that penetrated through the superstructure before exploding with little effect and without causing any casualties. Another shell, probably also 24 cm in size (though possibly a 38 cm shell from Richelieu) detonated in the water on the starboard side abreast of the funnel. The resulting shockwave pushed the bulge inwards for a length of 7 feet (2.1 m) and it started to slowly flood.

After a conference aboard Barham later that day, the Allied commanders resolved to continue the attack. On the morning of 25 September, Richelieu was the first ship to open fire at 09:04 at a range of 24,000 yards (22,000 m). As the British battleships were manoeuvring to take up their positions, the submarine Bévéziers fired a spread of four torpedoes at a range of 2,700 yards (2,500 m). Barham was able to dodge them, but Resolution was struck by one torpedo amidships that caused a heavy list, and she fell out of line. Barham opened fire at a range of 21,000 yards (19,000 m) and hit Richelieu with one 15-inch shell at 09:15. The shell devastated a messdeck and dented the armoured deck by a depth of 8 centimetres (3.1 in), but caused no casualties. The severe damage to Resolution caused Operation Menace to be abandoned and Barham had to tow her to Freetown for temporary repairs, before escorting a convoy to Gibraltar where she arrived on 15 October where her own damage was repaired. She was briefly assigned to Force H, before she was transferred to the Mediterranean Fleet in November 1940.

Barham, two cruisers, and three destroyers also assigned to the Mediterranean Fleet were designated Force F as part of Operation Coat, one of a complex series of fleet movements in the Mediterranean. The battleship and the other ships of Force F were tasked to ferry troops to Malta, before continuing on to Alexandria. Barham was loaded with 600 troops, including the men of 12 Field Regiment, Royal Artillery, Force F departed Gibraltar on 7 November, escorted by Force H, rendezvoused with the main body of the Mediterranean Fleet three days later and unloaded their cargo at Malta later that day. While sailing eastwards, the aircraft carrier Illustrious was detached from the main body to attack Taranto on the night of 11/12 November, damaging three Italian battleships. Barham, now assigned to the 1st BS, and Malaya were detached to refuel at Souda Bay, Crete, before sailing for Alexandria, reaching there on 14 November. As part of Operation Collar in late November, Barham, Malaya and the carrier HMS Eagle covered the forces rendezvousing with a convoy coming from Gibraltar. En route, Eagle's aircraft attacked Tripoli on 26 November. Barham became the flagship of the 1st BS in December.

=== 1941 ===
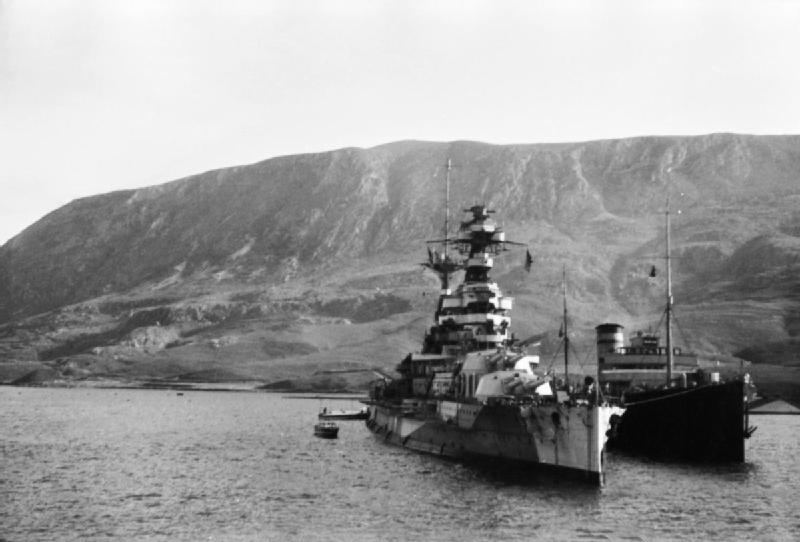
Barham refuelling in Souda Bay, February 1941

On 3 January 1941, the ship, together with Warspite and Valiant, bombarded Bardia as a prelude to the Battle of Bardia. On 26 March, the Italian fleet sortied in an attempt to intercept British convoys to Greece. The British had recently broken the Italian codes and sailed after dark on the 27th to intercept the Italians. The following morning, they were spotted by an aircraft from the carrier Formidable and the Battle of Cape Matapan began. Multiple air strikes by Formidable's Fairey Swordfish torpedo bombers damaged the battleship Vittorio Veneto and crippled the heavy cruiser Pola later that evening. Admiral Angelo Iachino, commander of the Italian fleet, ordered the two other heavy cruisers of the 1st Division to render assistance to Pola in the darkness. The Italian ships and the British arrived almost simultaneously at Pola's location, but the Italians had almost no clue that the British were nearby. On the other hand, the British knew exactly where the Italians were, thanks to their radar-equipped ships. They opened fire at point-blank range, Barham crippling the destroyer Alfredo Oriani and then joining Warspite and Valiant in crippling Zara.

In mid-April she escorted the fast transport MV Breconshire, together with Warspite and Valiant, from Alexandria to Malta before the battleships bombarded Tripoli on the evening of 20 April. On 6–12 May, she covered the Alexandria-Malta convoy of Operation Tiger. With her newly arrived sister Queen Elizabeth, Barham escorted Formidable as her aircraft attacked the Italian airfield at Scarpanto at dawn on 26 May with some success. While covering the evacuation of Crete the following day, the ship was attacked by Junkers Ju 88 bombers from II./LG (Demonstration Wing) 1 and Heinkel He 111 bombers of II./KG (Bomber Wing) 26. One 250-kilogram (550 lb) bomb struck 'Y' turret and started a fire inside the turret that took 20 minutes to quench. A near miss ruptured her portside bulge over an area 20 by 16 feet (6.1 by 4.9 m) and caused a 1.5 degree list that was easily corrected by pumping oil. Casualties were five dead and six wounded. She reached Alexandria later that day, but she was too large for the floating dock there and had to be sent elsewhere for repairs. She sailed south through the Suez Canal to Mombasa, Kenya, where her damage was inspected. It proved to be worse than expected and Barham had to be repaired at Durban, South Africa, as she was unfit to make the trans-Atlantic crossing for repair in the United States. Repairs were completed six weeks later on 30 July and the ship returned to Alexandria in August where she resumed her role as flagship of the 1st Battle Squadron.

==== Sinking ====
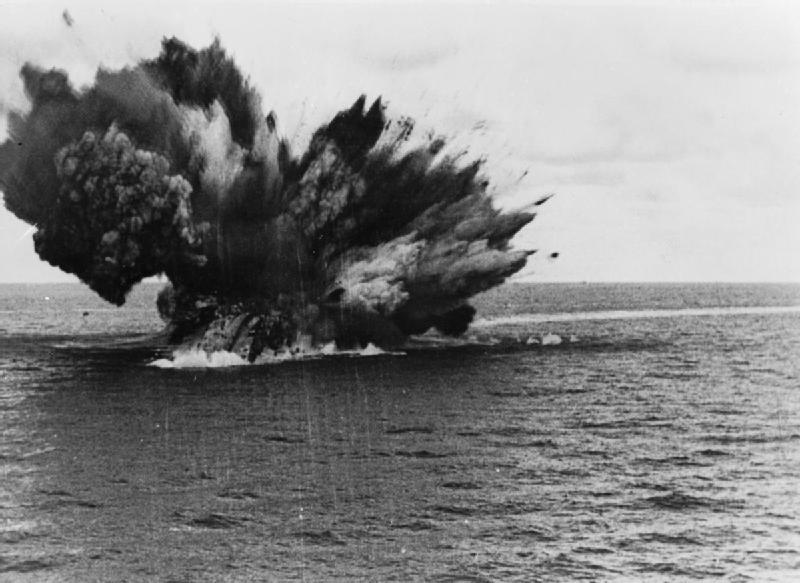
Magazine exploding, 25 November 1941

On the afternoon of 24 November 1941, the 1st Battle Squadron, Barham, Queen Elizabeth, and Valiant, with an escort of eight destroyers, departed Alexandria to cover the 7th and 15th Cruiser Squadrons as they hunted for Italian convoys in the Central Mediterranean. The following morning, the German submarine U-331, commanded by Oberleutnant zur See Hans-Diedrich von Tiesenhausen, detected the faint engine noises of the British ships and moved to intercept. By the afternoon the submarine and the 1st Battle Squadron were on reciprocal courses and Tiesenhausen ordered his boat to battle stations around 16:00. An ASDIC operator aboard one of the leading destroyers, Jervis, detected the submarine at 16:18 at an estimated range of 900–1,100 yards (820–1,010 m), but the contact was disregarded as it subtended an angle between 40 and 60 degrees wide, far larger than a submarine. U-331 thus passed through the screen and was in a position to fire her torpedoes after the leading ship, Queen Elizabeth, had passed her by and the second ship, Barham, was closing rapidly. Tiesenhausen ordered all four bow torpedo tubes fired at a range of 375 metres (410 yd) at 16:25. Possibly due to her closeness to Valiant's bow wave and discharging the torpedoes, the boat's conning tower broached the surface and was fruitlessly engaged by one of the battleship's "pom-pom"s at a range of about 30 yards (27 m). The boat dived out of control after she broached, reaching an indicated depth of 265 metres (869 ft), well below her design depth rating of 150 metres (490 ft), before she stabilised without any damage. U-331 was not attacked by the escorting destroyers and reached port on 3 December. Tiesenhausen was not certain of the results of his attack and radioed that he had hit a Queen Elizabeth-class battleship with one torpedo.

There was no time for evasive action, and three of the four torpedoes struck amidships so closely together as to throw up a single massive water column. Barham quickly capsized to port and was lying on her side when a powerful magazine explosion occurred about four minutes after she was torpedoed and sank her. The Board of Enquiry into the sinking ascribed the final explosion to a fire in the 4-inch magazines outboard of the main 15-inch magazines, which would have then spread to and detonated the contents of the main magazines. Due to the speed at which she sank, 862 officers and ratings were killed, including two who died of their wounds after being rescued. The destroyer Hotspur rescued 337 survivors, including Vice-Admiral Henry Pridham-Wippell and the pair who later died of their wounds, while the Australian destroyer Nizam reportedly rescued 150 men. (Note: Jones refers to the 861 men listed in the casualty list published by the Times in 1942, but the biggest discrepancies concern the number of survivors. Naval historians Alan Raven and John Roberts give a figure of 396, while historian Jurgen Rohwer says 450.) Captain Geoffrey Cooke went down with his ship. The sinking was captured on film by a cameraman from Pathé News, aboard Valiant.

==== Aftermath ====
To conceal the sinking from the Germans and to protect British morale, the Board of Admiralty censored all news of Barham's sinking. After a delay of several weeks the War Office notified the next of kin, but they added a special request for secrecy: the notification letters included a warning not to discuss the loss of the ship with anyone but close relatives, stating it was "most essential that information of the event which led to the loss of your husband's life should not find its way to the enemy until such time as it is announced officially..." Following repeated claims by German radio, the Admiralty officially announced the loss on 27 January 1942 and explained that

it was clear at that time that the enemy did not know that she had been sunk, and it was important to make certain dispositions before the loss of this ship was made public.

It was not until the Admiralty admitted that Barham had been sunk and described the circumstances that Tiesenhausen knew that he had sunk her. He was awarded the Knight's Cross of the Iron Cross that day. The Barham's crew are commemorated by a memorial bench, located in Nothe Gardens, Weymouth.

Helen Duncan, considered the last person to be imprisoned under the Witchcraft Act 1735, came to the attention of the authorities after claiming to have contacted the spirit of a sailor of Barham, at the time when the ship's sinking was being hidden from the general public.
