= Hired armed cutter Duchess of Cumberland =

At least three hired armed cutters named Duchess of Cumberland have served the Royal Navy.

== First Duchess of Cumberland ==
The first Duchess of Cumberland served in 1783.

== Second Duchess of Cumberland ==
The second Duchess of Cumberland was a cutter of eight guns and 65 49/94 tons burthen (bm). She served from 2 April 1793 to 27 October 1800.

== Third Duchess of Cumberland ==
The third Duchess of Cumberland was a cutter of six 3-pounder guns and 65 82/94 tons burthen (bm). She served from 17 June 1803 to 5 January 1805. Her owner was Henshaw Latham and she had a crew of 23 men. Latham received £2008 for her hire. She was under the command of Lieutenant John Sibrell (or Sybrille).

== Citations and references ==
Citations

References

- Winfield, Rif (2008). British Warships in the Age of Sail 1793–1817: Design, Construction, Careers and Fates. Seaforth. ISBN 1861762461.
