= Lagidze water =

Georgian soft drink

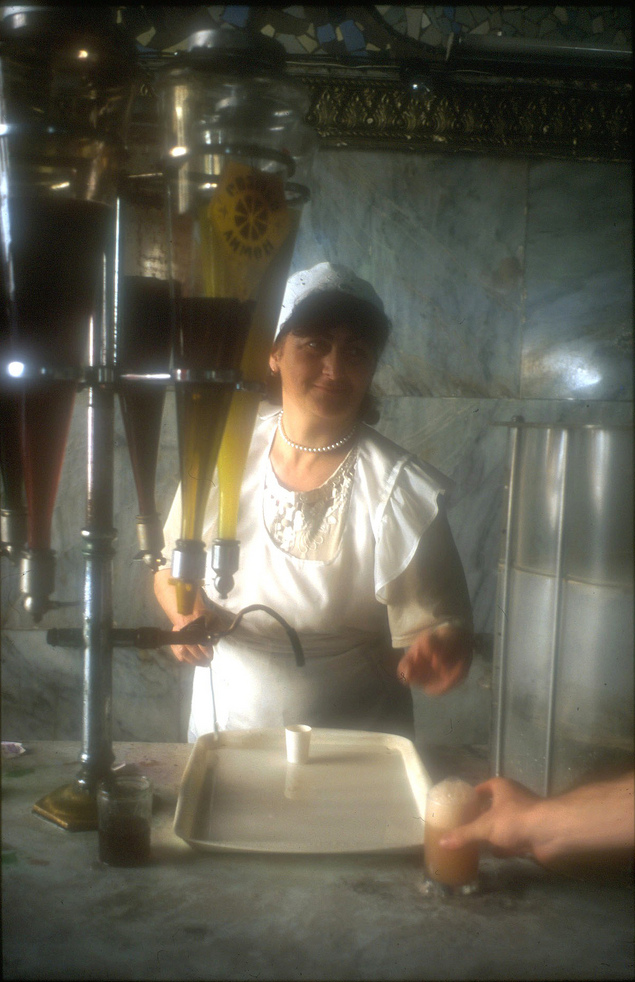
Lagidze water

Lagidze water (Georgian: ლაღიძის წყალი, romanized: laghidzis ts'q'ali) is a popular Georgian soft drink based on soda and a variety of natural syrups. It has been traditionally mixed in a glass from a soda fountain, but it is also available as a bottled soft drink in a range of flavors. Some American food writers liken it to egg cream, but the authentic Georgian drink includes neither milk nor chocolate syrup.

Lagidze water is named after Mitrofan Lagidze, a pharmacist's apprentice in Kutaisi, Georgia, who in 1887 explored the idea of using natural syrups instead of imported flavored essences in making lemonades. In 1900, the Lagidze Brothers plant in Kutaisi began blending unique proprietary flavors from herbs and fruits. Today, Lagidze waters are produced in a wide range of natural flavors, including quince (aiva), pear, citrus fruit, cherry, tarragon, and others. Lagidze waters are distributed in Russia, Ukraine, the three Baltic states, Poland, and Armenia. The technology and culture of the Lagidze Waters were inscribed on the Intangible Cultural Heritage of Georgia list in 2014.

== See also ==
- Tarkhuna (drink)
