= Tarkhuna =

Georgian carbonated soft drink

Tarkhuna ტარხუნა Թարխուն Тархуна
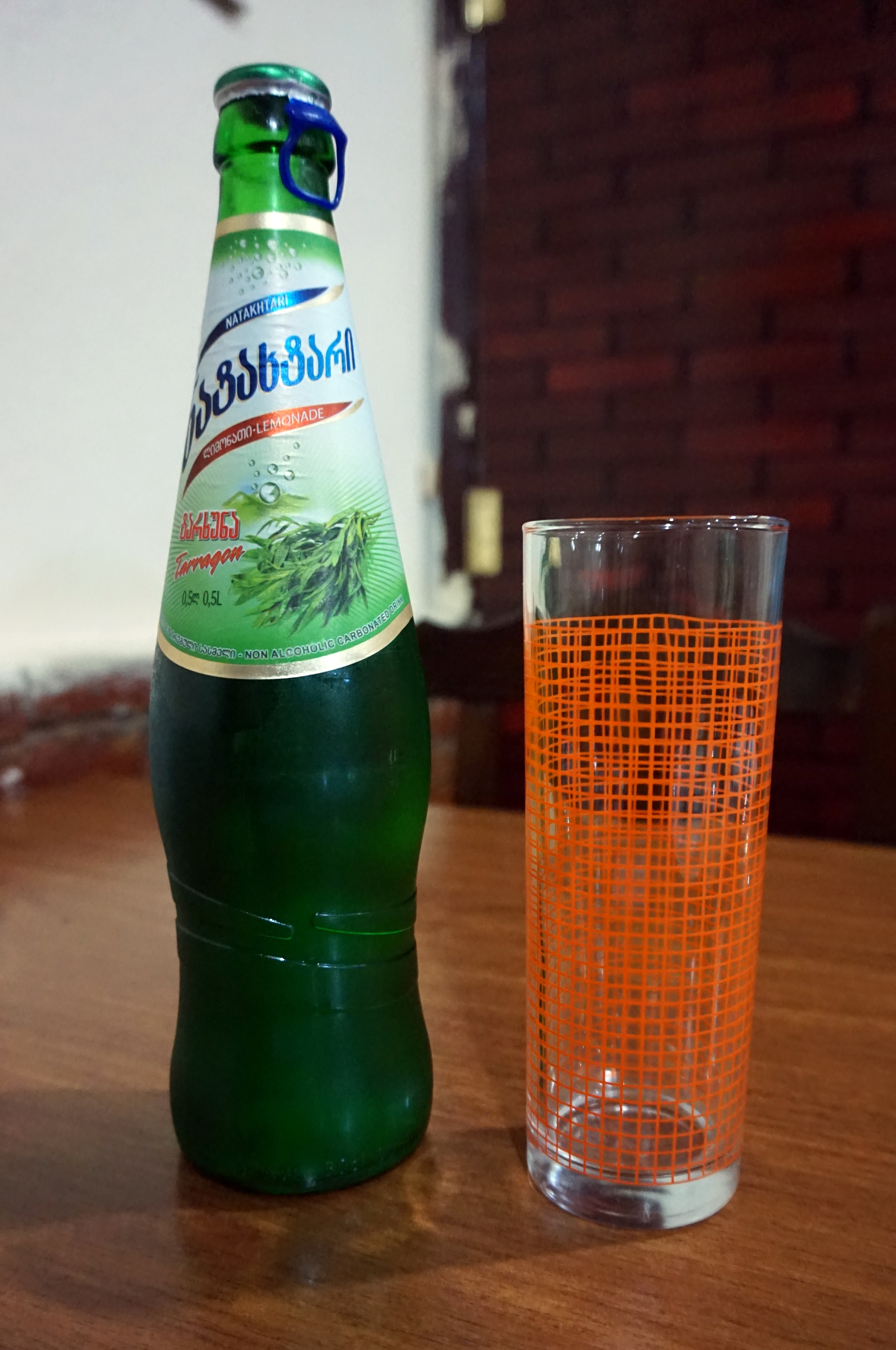
- Bottled Tarkhuna by Natakhtari
- Type: Soft drink
- Origin: Georgia
- Introduced: 1887; 139 years ago
- Color: Green
- Flavor: Tarragon and woodruff

Tarkhuna (Georgian: ტარხუნა, Georgian pronunciation: [tʼaɾχuna] is a Georgian carbonated tarragon and/or woodruff-flavored soft drink, first ever created in 1887 in Kutaisi by Georgian pharmacist Mitrofan Lagidze.

Mitrofan Lagidze began to add odorous chukhpuch containing extract of Caucasian tarragon to sparkling water with natural syrups of his own production. Before the First World War, Lagidze repeatedly received gold medals at international exhibitions for his water. In 1927, the Soviet authorities built a plant for the production of "Lagidze water" in Tbilisi, and Lagidze himself was appointed director.

== Availability ==
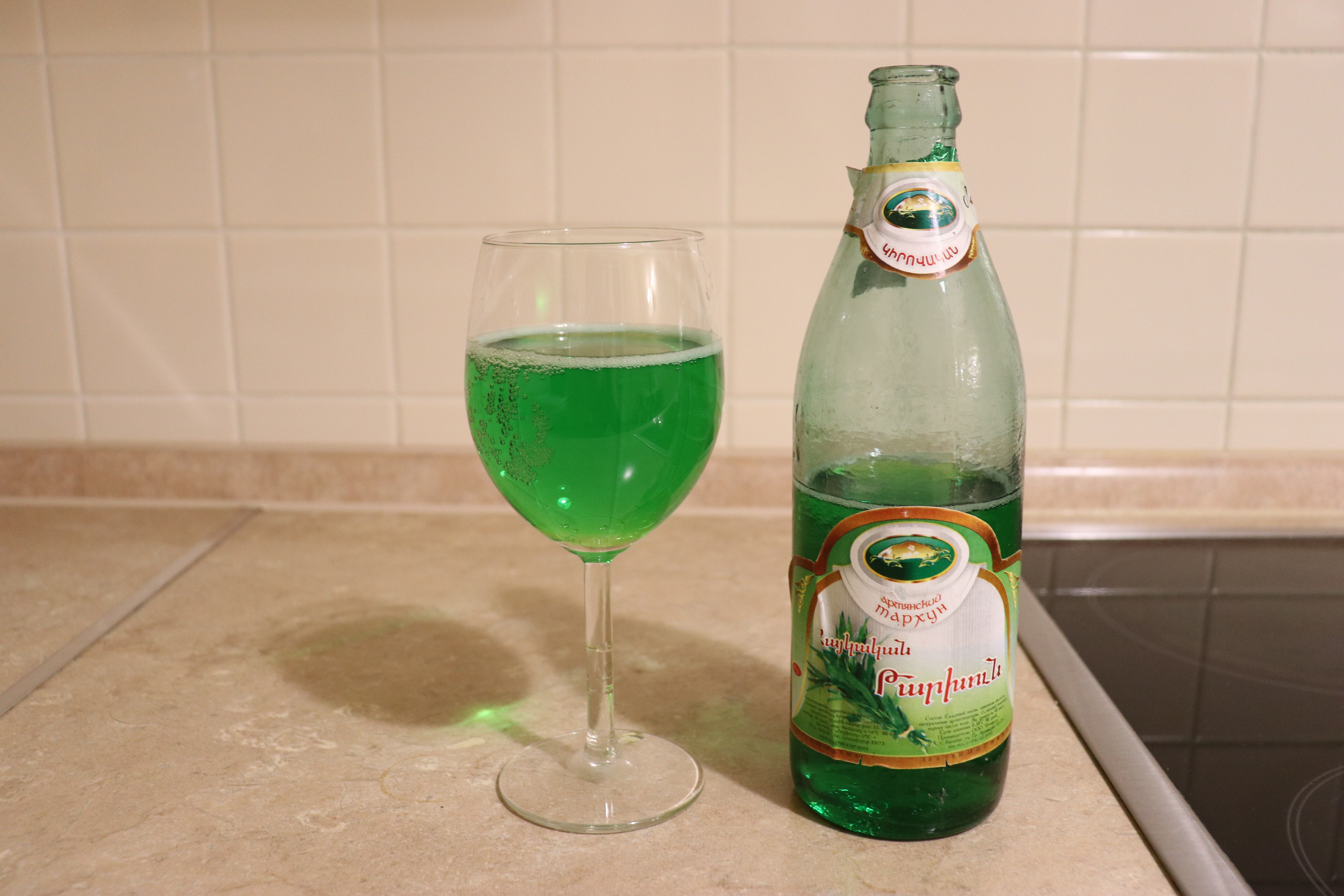
Armenian Tarkhun

As of 2019, Tarkhuna is produced in Georgia by multiple brands including Natakhtari, Zedazeni and Lagidze, in Lithuania by Selita Klasika as Tarchunas and in Russia, where one of the producers is OAO Narzan under the brand Ledyanaya Zhemjushina. The drink became available on the general USSR market for the first time in 1981. The pilot batch was sold on the territory of the Main Botanical Garden of the USSR Academy of Sciences in standard 0.33-liter bottles. Subsequently, its recipe was transferred to food industry enterprises, and, since 1983, "Tarhun" began to be sold in many republics of the USSR and administrative regions of the RSFSR in bottles of 0.33 and 0.5 liters. Nowadays, it is one of the most popular beverages in Georgia, Armenia and Russia.

== Trademark status ==
In a trademark dispute between OÜ Acerra and AS Tallinna Karastusjoogid, the Estonian Ministry of Economic Affairs and Communications determined that the word Tarhun is a descriptive term for the drink, and is thus not trademarkable under the laws of the Republic of Estonia. In Estonia, it was possible to find both the Estonian-made and Russian-made Tarhun drinks from the same soft drinks aisle, as the soft drink is distilled and bottled in both countries, though by different companies and with slightly different recipes. In 2015, the Estonian soft drinks company AS Tallinna Karastusjoogid, who were the local producer and distributor of "Tarhun", ceased operations, and its owner AS Haljas put the producer on sale to a 'foreign investor', whose name and country of origin has remained unknown. As of 2019, stores in Estonia variously sell tarkhuna lemonades made in Georgia, Lithuania, and Russia; though none of these tarkhuna brands has reached universal distribution across most store chains.

== See also ==
- Duchess (drink)
- Lagidze water
