= HMS Duchess (H64) =

British D-class destroyer

Coordinates: 55°21′51″N 6°02′42″W

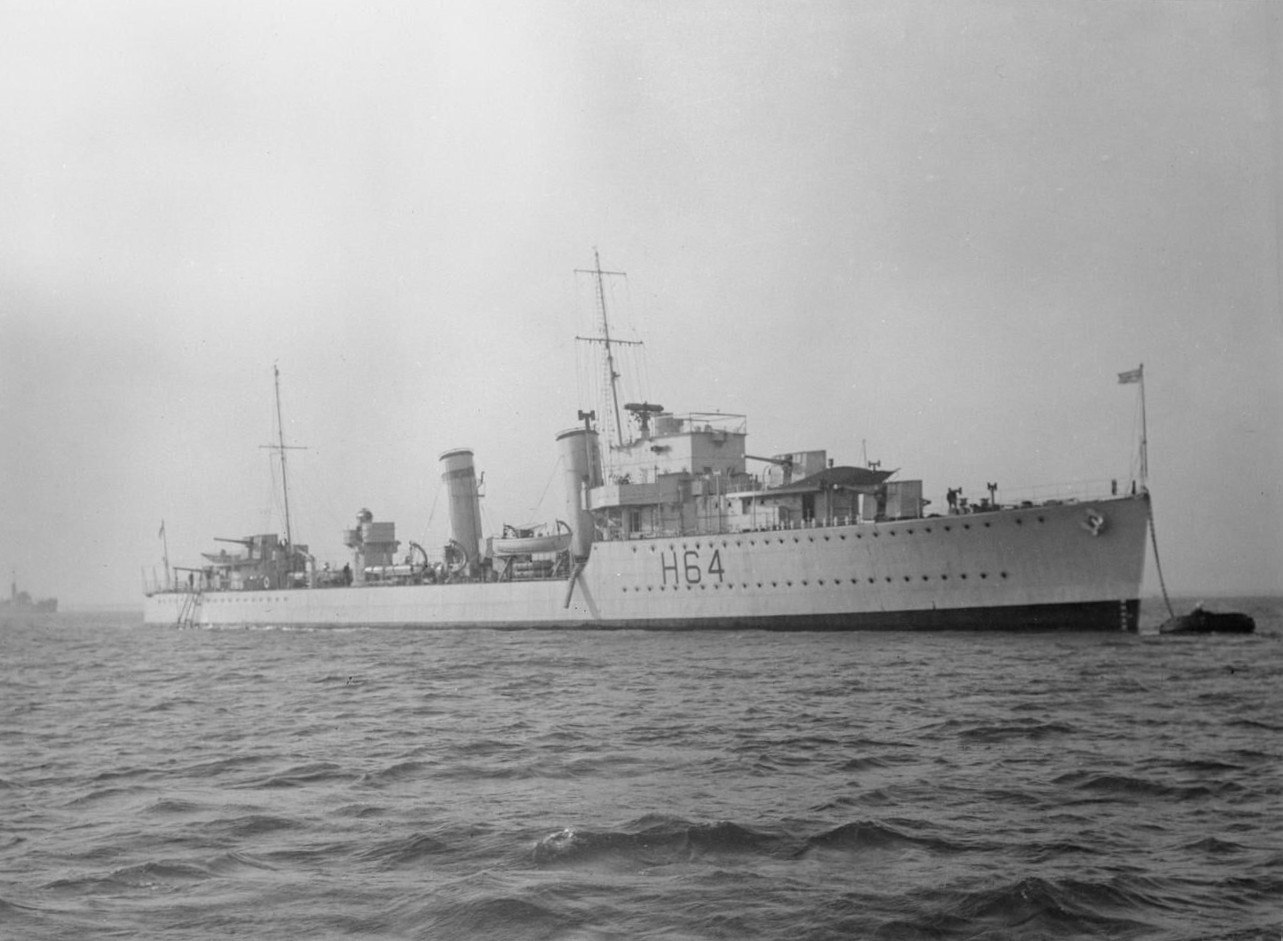
- Duchess at anchor

History

United Kingdom
- Name: HMS Duchess
- Ordered: 2 February 1931
- Builder: Palmers Shipbuilding and Iron Company, Jarrow, County Durham
- Cost: £229,367
- Laid down: 12 June 1931
- Launched: 19 July 1932
- Completed: 27 January 1933
- Commissioned: 24 January 1933
- Motto: Duci non trahi; ("Led, not driven")
- Fate: Sunk in a collision with HMS Barham, 12 December 1939
- Notes: Badge: On a Field Blue, a Duchess's coronet Proper over a terrestrial globe Silver.

General characteristics
- Class & type: D-class destroyer
- Displacement: 1,375 long tons (1,397 t) (standard); 1,890 long tons (1,920 t) (deep)
- Length: 329 ft (100.3 m) o/a
- Beam: 33 ft (10.1 m)
- Draught: 12 ft 6 in (3.8 m)
- Installed power: 36,000 shp (27,000 kW)
- Propulsion: 2 × shafts, 2 × Parsons geared steam turbines; 3 × Admiralty 3-drum boilers
- Speed: 36 knots (67 km/h; 41 mph)
- Range: 5,870 nmi (10,870 km; 6,760 mi) at 15 knots (28 km/h; 17 mph)
- Complement: 145
- Sensors & processing systems: ASDIC
- Armament: 4 × QF 4.7-inch Mark IX guns; 1 × 12-pounder (3 in (76.2 mm)) anti-aircraft (AA) gun; 2 × 4 - QF .5-inch Vickers Mark III AA machine guns; 2 × 4 - 21 inch (533 mm) torpedo tubes; 20 × depth charges, 1 rail and 2 throwers

HMS Duchess was a D-class destroyer built for the Royal Navy in the early 1930s. The ship was initially assigned to the Mediterranean Fleet before she was transferred to the China Station in early 1935. She was temporarily deployed in the Red Sea during late 1935 during the Abyssinia Crisis, before returning to her duty station where she remained until mid-1939. Duchess was transferred back to the Mediterranean Fleet just before the Second World War began in September 1939. While escorting the battleship HMS Barham back to the British Isles, she was accidentally rammed by the battleship in thick fog and sank with heavy loss of life on 12 December 1939.

== Description ==
Duchess displaced 1,375 long tons (1,397 t) at standard load and 1,890 long tons (1,920 t) at deep load. The ship had an overall length of 329 feet (100.3 m), a beam of 33 feet (10.1 m) and a draught of 12 feet 6 inches (3.8 m). She was powered by Parsons geared steam turbines, driving two shafts, which developed a total of 36,000 shaft horsepower (27,000 kW) and gave a maximum speed of 36 knots (67 km/h; 41 mph). Steam for the turbines was provided by three Admiralty 3-drum water-tube boilers. Duchess carried a maximum of 473 long tons (481 t) of fuel oil that gave her a range of 5,870 nautical miles (10,870 km; 6,760 mi) at 15 knots (28 km/h; 17 mph). The ship's complement was 145 officers and men.

The ship mounted four 45-calibre QF 4.7-inch Mk IX guns in single mounts. For anti-aircraft (AA) defence, Duchess had a single 12-pounder (3-inch (76.2 mm)) gun and two quadruple Mk I mounts for the 0.5-inch Vickers Mk III machine gun. She was fitted with two above-water quadruple torpedo tube mounts for 21-inch (533 mm) torpedoes. One depth charge rail and two throwers were fitted; 20 depth charges were originally carried, but this increased to 35 shortly after the war began.

== Construction and career ==
Duchess was ordered on 2 February 1931 under the 1930 Naval Estimates and was laid down at the yards of the Palmers Shipbuilding and Iron Company, Jarrow, County Durham on 12 June 1931. She was launched on 19 July 1932 and commissioned on 24 January 1933, at a total cost of £229,367, excluding equipment supplied by the Admiralty, such as weapons, ammunition and wireless equipment. The ship was initially assigned to the 1st Destroyer Flotilla in the Mediterranean and made a brief deployment to the Persian Gulf and the Red Sea in September–November 1933. Upon her return, her superheaters were repaired at Malta between 18 December and 6 January 1934. She was given a refit at Chatham Dockyard from 3 September to 23 October to prepare the ship for service on the China Station.

Duchess arrived in Hong Kong in January 1935 where she joined the 8th Destroyer Flotilla. The ship was attached to the Mediterranean Fleet in the Red Sea from September to November during the Abyssinian Crisis. She made a number of goodwill visits during her time on the station as well as conducting anti-piracy patrols. During a typhoon at Hong Kong on 2 September 1937, a merchant ship crushed Duchess's stern when it dragged its anchors. Her repairs were not completed until 14 October.

The ship remained on the station until late August 1939, when the imminent start of the Second World War caused the Admiralty to order her to take up her war station with the Mediterranean Fleet at Malta. Duchess arrived there on 12 October and remained in the Mediterranean for the next two months. In December the ship, along with her sisters HMS Delight, HMS Duncan and HMS Dainty, was assigned to escort the battleship HMS Barham back to the UK, and they departed Gibraltar on 6 December. During the morning of 12 December, Barham collided with Duchess off the Mull of Kintyre in heavy fog. The destroyer capsized and her depth charges exploded, killing 136 of her crew including her commanding officer, Lieutenant Commander Robert C. M. White, who was trapped in his sea cabin when the sliding door jammed.
