= Gerhard von Tiesenhausen =

Latvian architect

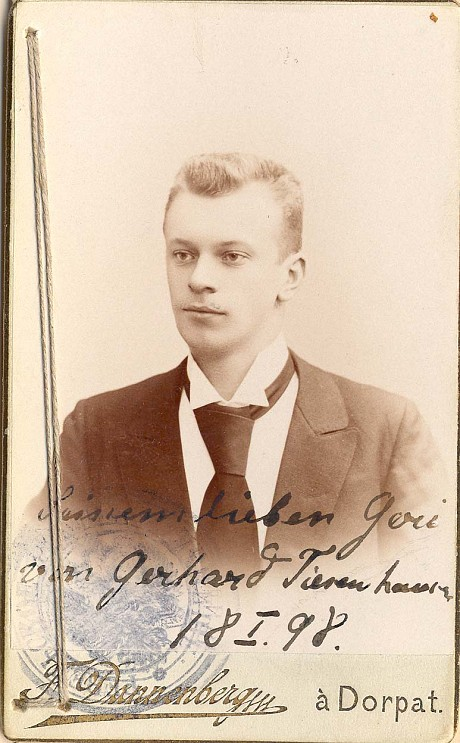
- von Tiesenhausen circa 1898
- Born: Gerhard Diedrich Jakob von Tiesenhausen; 26 March 1878; Dorpat, Livonian Governorate, Russian Empire (Now Tartu Estonia)
- Died: 26 October 1917 (aged 39); Tiraspol, Russian republic (Now Republic of Moldova)
- Known for: architecture
- Movement: Art Nouveau

Gerhard Diedrich Jakob von Tiesenhausen (Latvian: Gerhards fon Tīzenhauzens; 26 March 1878 in Tartu – 26 October 1917 in Tiraspol) was a Livonian Art Nouveau architect. He was from the Tiesenhausens ancestry, father of Hans-Diedrich von Tiesenhausen.

Gerhard von Tiesenhausen was born in Dorpat (Tartu) 26 March 1878. His father was a Major General Carl Jacob Reinhold von Tiesenhausen, member of Baltic nobility.

He studied architecture in Riga Polytechnical Institute and graduated in 1906. During his studies he became member of student corporation Fraternitas Baltica.

In 1907 he supervised construction works of a Lutheran church in Novorossiysk. Later he worked as an architect in St. Petersburg. In 1909 he returned to Riga and until 1910 was employed in the office of architect E. von Trompovsky. Later he actively participated in development of Keiserwald (Mežaparks) neighbourghood of Riga. Between 1911 and 1913 he designed 44 buildings there including his own family mansion.

After the start of First World war Gerhard von Tiesenhausen was drafted into Russian Imperial army. In 1916 he was sent to Tiraspol where he supervised construction works of a military barracks. He died there on 26 October 1917 after an accident.

== Gallery ==
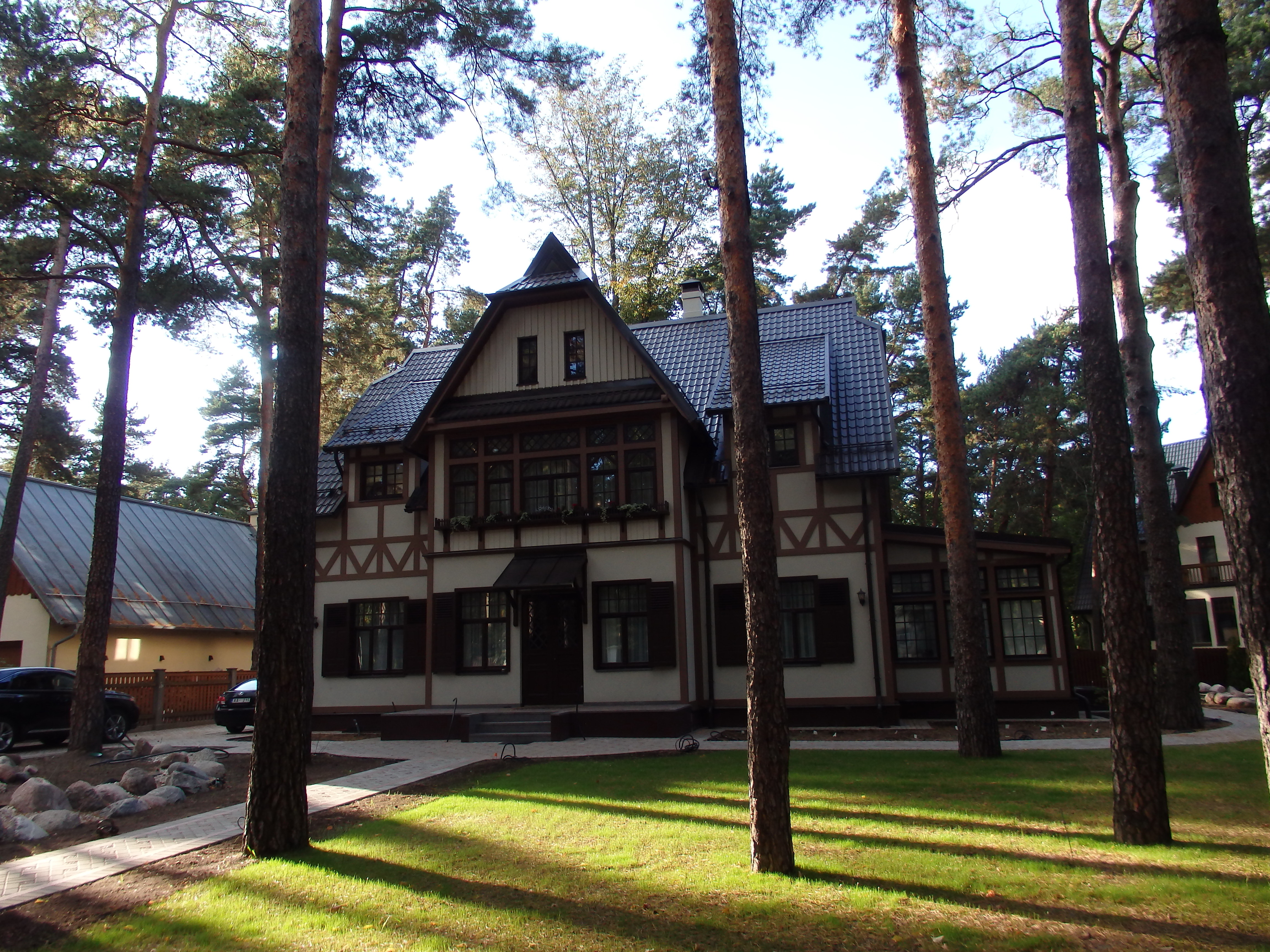
Mansion on Stokholmas street 25, Riga. (1911)

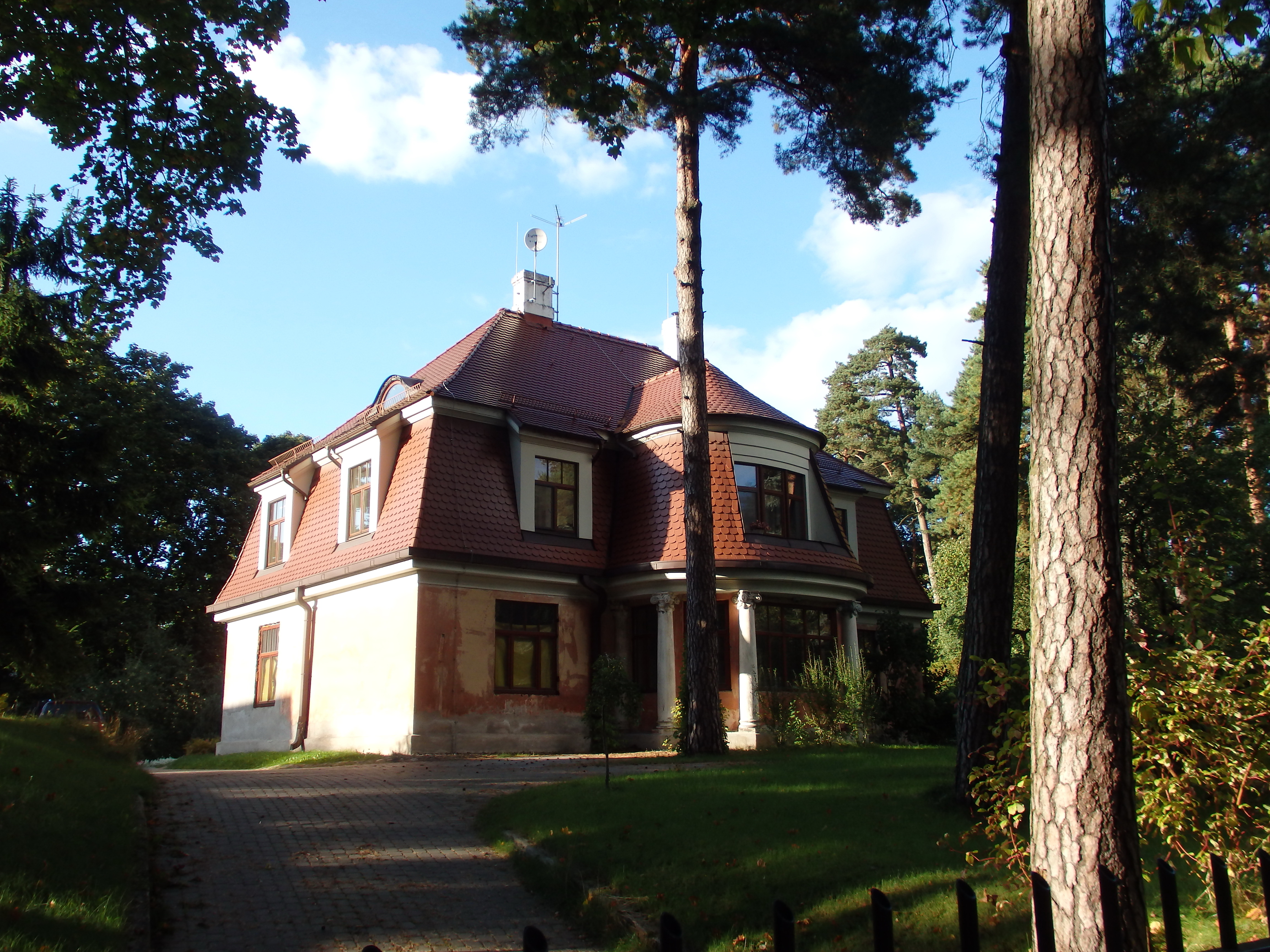
Mansion on Stokholmas street 39, Riga. (1912)

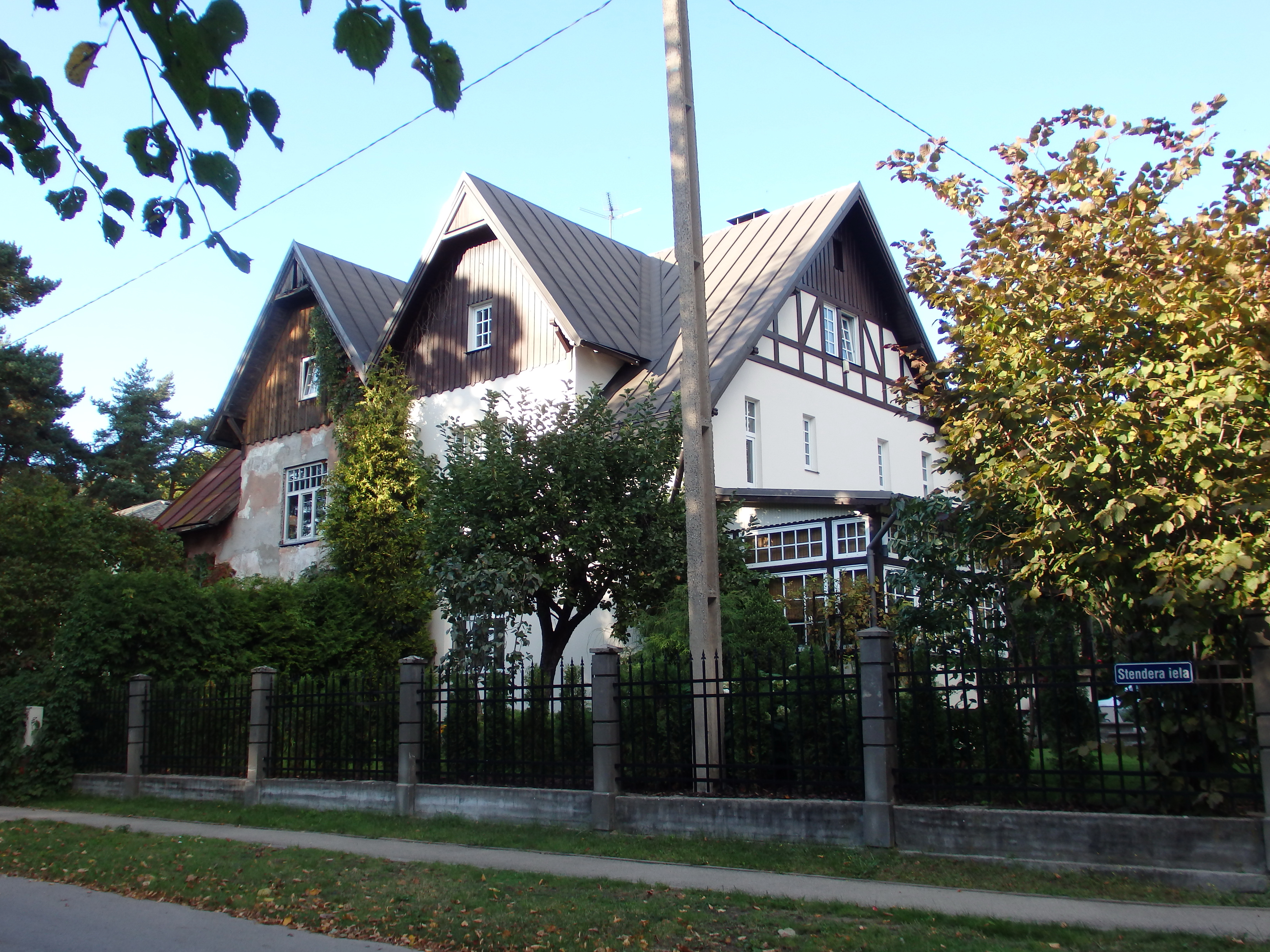
Residential (twin) house on Stokholmas street 69, Riga (1911)

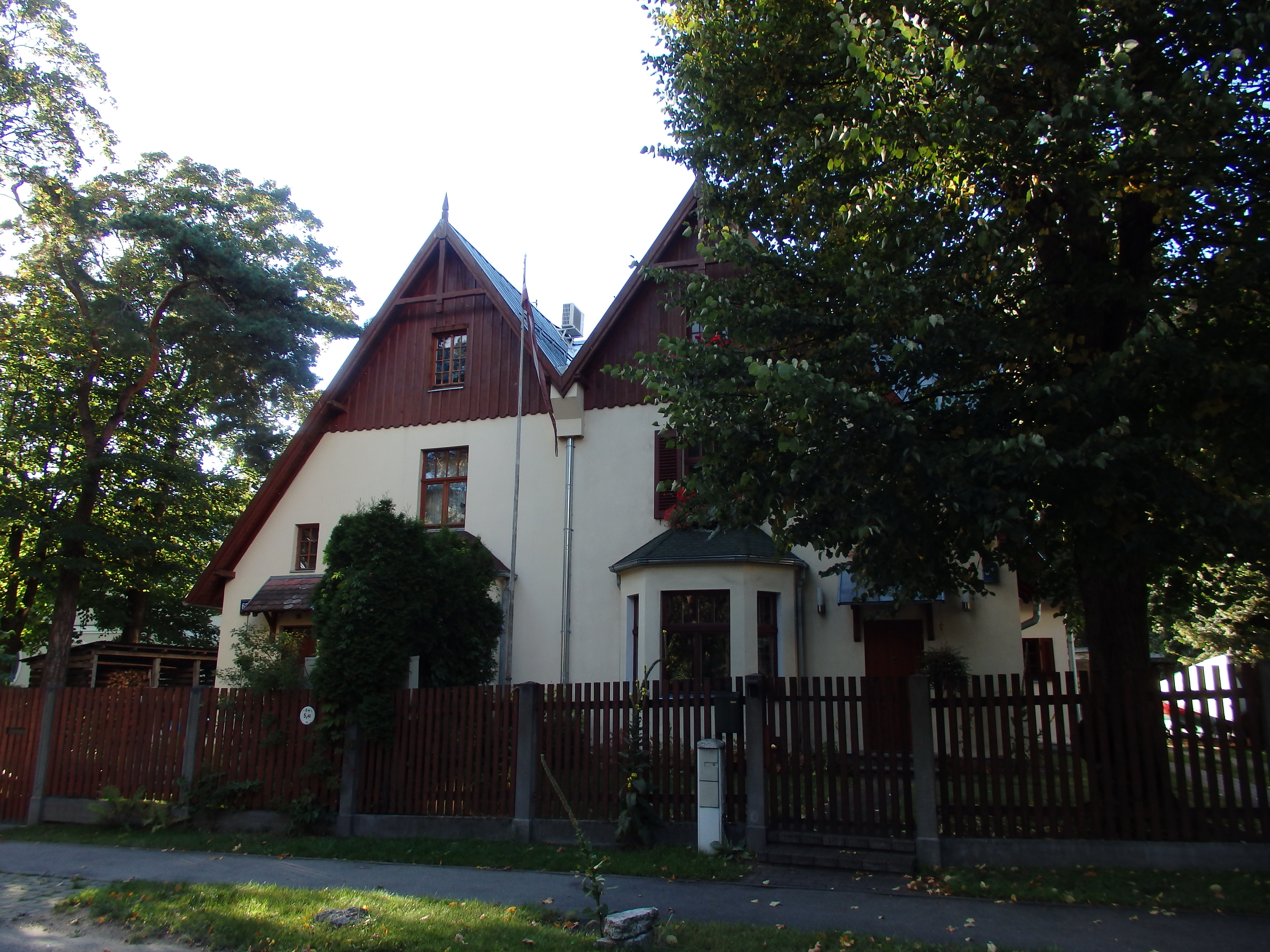
Residential (twin) house on Stokholmas street 61/63, Riga. (1911)
