= HMS Griper (1804) =

Brig of the Royal Navy

History

United Kingdom
- Name: HMS Griper
- Ordered: 9 January 1804
- Builder: Josiah & Thomas Brindley, King's Lynn
- Laid down: April 1804
- Launched: 6 December 1804
- Fate: Wrecked 18 February 1807

General characteristics
- Class & type: Archer-class gunbrig
- Tons burthen: 17940/94 (bm)
- Length: Overall:80 ft 2 in (24.4 m); Keel:65 ft 10 3/4 in (20.1 m)
- Beam: 22 ft 7 1/2 in (6.9 m)
- Depth of hold: 9 ft 5 in (2.9 m)
- Armament: 2 chase guns + 10 × 18-pounder carronades

HMS Griper was a later Archer-class gunbrig launched in 1804 and wrecked in 1807.

== Career ==
Lieutenant Edward Morris commissioned Griper in October 1804.

Griper was among the many vessels of the Boulogne squadron that shared in the proceeds of the capture off Cap Gris Nez on 24 April 1805 of a number of Dutch schuyts, most of them armed and carrying soldiers as well as their crews.

Griper was among the vessels that shared in the proceeds of Frederick, captured on 2 August 1805.

Griper was among the vessels that shared in the proceeds of the capture on 22 August of Susannah Margaretha. (Note: A seaman's share of the prize money was 7s 1 3/4d.)

Griper shared with Active, Earnest, Carrier, Mariner, and Minx in the proceeds from the recapture of Francis, Tucker, master, and Betsey on 14 and 15 September.

Griper, Cruizer, Minx, Mariner, and Earnest were all part of the Boulogne squadron and so all shared in the proceeds of the recapture on 29 September 1805 of Rover, of Newcastle, Hillary, master. (Note: A seaman's share of the prize money was 3s 1d.) (Note: Her captors sent Rover into Ramsgate.)

The next day Gripper recaptured Commerce, Wallace, master.

On 24 April 1806 Griper captured Emanuel, Ole Ambriarusen, master.

In November Lloyd's List reported that Griper had detained and sent into Yarmouth Jonge Berta, Pedersen, master, which had been sailing from Hamburg to Caen.

== Fate ==
A storm on 18 February 1807 drove Griper, Lieutenant Morris, commander, on shore on the French coast near Ostend. She was wrecked and there were no survivors.
