= HMS Calypso (1805) =

Brig-sloop of the Royal Navy

- Calypso

History

United Kingdom
- Name: HMS Calypso
- Ordered: 15 October 1803
- Builder: John Dudman, Deptford, Kent
- Launched: 2 February 1805
- Honours and awards: Naval General Service Medal with clasp "Off Mardoe 6 July 1812"
- Fate: Broken up March 1821

General characteristics
- Type: Cruizer-class brig-sloop
- Tons burthen: 382 (bm)
- Length: 100 ft 0 in (30.5 m) (gundeck); 77 ft 3 1/2 in (23.6 m) (keel)
- Beam: 30 ft 6 in (9.3 m)
- Draught: 6 ft 6 in (2.0 m) (unladen);10 ft 0 in (3.0 m) (laden)
- Depth of hold: 12 ft 9 in (3.9 m)
- Sail plan: Brig rigged
- Complement: 121
- Armament: 16 × 32-pounder carronades; 2 × 6-pounder bow guns

HMS Calypso was a Royal Navy Cruizer-class brig-sloop. She was built at Deptford Wharf between 1804 and 1805, and launched in 1805. She served in the North Sea and the Baltic, most notably at the Battle of Lyngør, which effectively ended the Gunboat War. Calypso was broken up in March 1821.

== Service ==
Commander Matthew Foster commissioned Calypso and in February she was in the Downs. On 14 June 1805 Calypso and a large number of other British warships were in company when the gun-brig Basilisk captured the American ship Enoch. Between 18 and 23 July 1805, she participated in attacks on French convoys off Calais, Wimereux, and Ambleteuse.

On 18 July, Calypso, Fleche (Captain Thomas White), and the 20-gun sixth-rate post ship Arab (Captain Keith Maxwell) and two or three gun-brigs drove on shore six French gun-vessels. However, the bank off Cape Grinez, and the shot and shells from the right face of its powerful battery, soon compelled the British to haul off from the shore. Arab suffered seven wounded and a great deal of damage. Fleche was the closest inshore owing to her light draft of water; she had five men severely wounded and damage to her rigging. Forster received a severe shoulder wound and had to give up command of Calypso. (Note: After Forster recovered in 1808 he was appointed to Majestic. He did not receive a pension (of £250/annum), for his wounds until 1814.)

On 8 June 1809, Calypso sailed from Yarmouth as escort to vessels sailing for Hudson Bay.

Commander Matthew Martin Bradby replaced Forster. He commanded her off Dieppe and in the Downs until he received promotion to post-captain in June 1810.

Commander Henry Weir was promoted out of the 10-gun HMS Alban to take command of Calypso on 28 June 1810. In December Calypso detained and sent into Yarmouth Endracht, Vandervalk, master. Endracht had a cargo of tar.

She was in sight on 12 April 1811 when the hired armed cutter Princess of Wales captured Dragen, S.N. Svarer, Master, Emanuel, H.M. Hansen, Master, and Haabet, N.S. Lauristen, Master.

On 2 May Calypso captured Edell Catharina. On 14 June Weir captured the Danish privateer Nayahada off the coast of Jutland and destroyed another. Both were armed with ten guns.

Early in September Primus, carrying tar and hemp, Worksam, in ballast, Experiment, carrying iron, Columbus, carrying linseed, Neptunus, carrying timber, and Hector, carrying sundry goods, came into Yarmouth. They were prizes to Tremendous, Ranger, Calypso, Algerine, Musquito, Earnest. and Portia.

That autumn Calypso was caught in a storm in October or November in which she lost her top masts and suffered extensive damage. To survive, she had to throw her guns overboard.

On 26 October Calypso captured Den Norske Bonde. On 28 March Calypso captured Tallette. 12 April 1812 Calypso captured the Danish galliot Phoenix. Then on 14 April Calypso captured Mette Catharina.

=== Gunboat War ===
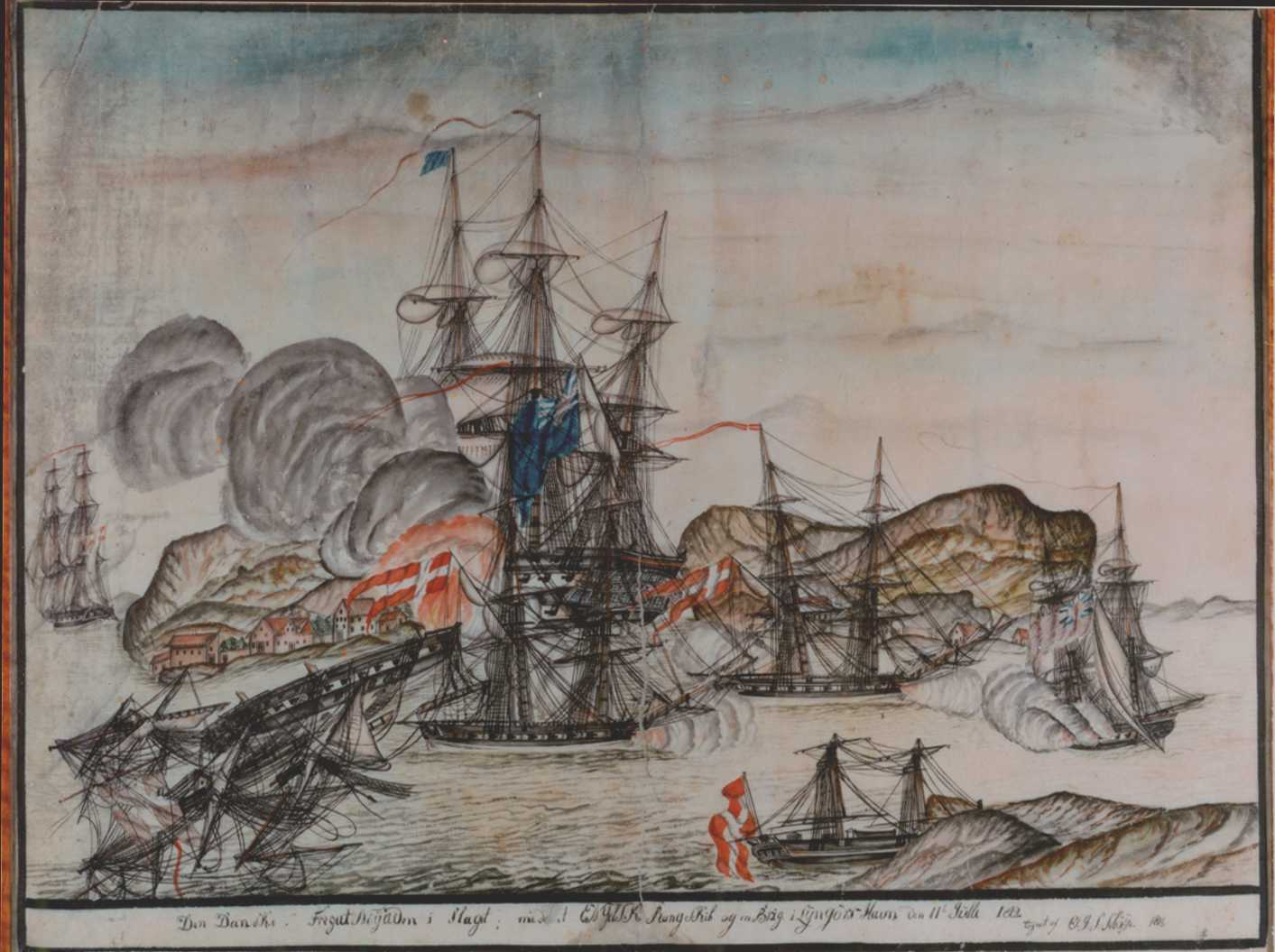
The Battle of Lyngør

On 6 July 1812, during the Gunboat War, Calypso, still under Weir, was off the island of Merdø on the coast of Norway. She was together with the 64-gun third rate Dictator (Captain James Patteson Stewart), 14-gun brig-sloop Podargus (Captain William Robilliard) and gun-brig Flamer (Lieutenant Thomas England), when the squadron sighted and chased a Danish squadron.

During the ensuing Battle of Lyngør Flamer stayed with Podargus to protect her after Podargus grounded. Dictator and Calypso succeeded in destroying the new, 40-gun frigate Najaden and badly damaging the 18-gun brigs Laaland, Samsoe, and Kiel, as well as a number of gunboats. The British tried to take out Laaland and Kiel but abandoned them when they grounded. The British did not set fire to either as the Norwegian vessels still had their crews and wounded aboard.

The action cost Dictator five killed and 24 wounded, Calypso three killed, one wounded, and two missing, Podargus, nine wounded, and Flamer one killed and one wounded. Najaden lost 133 dead and 82 wounded and the Danes acknowledged losing some 300 men killed and wounded overall.

Commander Weir received immediate promotion to post-captain; Commander Robilliard received his promotion the next December; Dictator's first lieutenant, William Buchanan, received promotion to commander. In 1847 the surviving British participants were authorized to apply for the clasp "Off Mardoe 6 July 1812" to the Naval General Service Medal.

Several days later the British sent the cutter Nimble to reconnoiter the situation. Nimble reported seeing four vessels at Christiansand, two of 18 guns and two of 16 guns. Nimble also saw numerous gunboats about. The Battle of Lyngør effectively ended the Gunboat War.

=== Baltic and Azores ===
Commander Thomas Groube replaced Weir in July 1812. On 7 March 1813, Calypso captured the Christine. Ten days later, Calypso and Bruizer captured Speculation. (Note: A first-class share of the prize money was worth £15 11s 6d; a sixth-class share, that of an ordinary seaman, was worth 4s 7d.)

On 9 August Calypso captured Marianne, while Orion, Hamadryad and Renard were in company.

Groube conveyed Lord George Walpole to St. Petersburg where Walpole served as Secretary at the Embassy and minister ad interim (i.e. "for the meantime"). Calypso participated at the siege of Danzig in 1813, which led to his promotion to post-captain on 7 June 1814.

Some accounts put Groube in Calypso at Faial in the Azores in late September. She took back to England some of the wounded from the debacle in which the American privateer General Armstrong, under Samuel Chester Reid, inflicted a defeat and heavy losses on cutting-out parties from the third rate Plantagenet, the frigate Rota, and Carnation, a sister ship to Calypso.

Groube's successor in June 1814 was Commander Charles Reid. On 21 February 1815 Reid recaptured Maid of the Mill. Then on 15 March Calypso and Meander were in company with Aquilon when Acquilon recaptured Thomas.

In 1816 Lieutenant John Sisson was acting commander.

=== Mediterranean ===
In April 1816, Lord Exmouth concluded treaties with the Regency of Algiers on the exchange of captives and slaves. Calypso carried to Genoa 40 Sardinians who had been slaves and brought back to Algiers eight Algerine captives, together with the ransom for the freed Sardinians.

== Fate ==
Calypso was in ordinary at Chatham from 1817 to 1820. She was broken up in 1821.

== Notable passengers ==
A future governor of New South Wales, Lachlan Macquarie, who would replace William Bligh after the Rum Rebellion, sailed on board Calypso from Kronstadt, (Russia) to Yarmouth, England in September/October 1807. He briefly visited Copenhagen whilst in transit.
