= Nelson (1807 ship) =

UK merchant ship 1807–1813

History

United Kingdom
- Owner: P.J.Miles & Co.
- Builder: Hilhouse
- Launched: 24 February 1807
- Captured: 31 January 1813

General characteristics
- Tons burthen: 574 (bm)
- Length: 103 ft 0 in (31.4 m)
- Beam: 32 ft 2 in (9.8 m)
- Complement: 35
- Armament: 14 × 4&9-pounder guns

Nelson was launched at Bristol in 1807 as a West Indiaman. In January 1813 a United States privateer captured her off Jamaica.

== Career ==
At the time of her launch, she was the largest vessel ever built at Bristol. Nelson first appeared in Lloyd's Register in the volume for 1807.

Year	Master	Owner	Trade	Source
1807	Thomas	P.J.Miles	Bristol–Jamaica	LR

Captain William Thomas acquired a letter of marque on 31 October 1809.

Year	Master	Owner	Trade	Source
1811	Thomas; T.Cox	P.J.Miles	Bristol–Jamaica	LR
1812	Thomas	P.J.Miles	Bristol–Jamaica	LR

== Fate ==
On 8 February 1813, HMS Algerine was in an action with an American privateer that escaped. In the action the British lost three men killed and seven or eight wounded. This single-ship action may have been with the American privateer Saratoga. Algerine returned to port in Jamaica, while Saratoga went on to capture Nelson. (Note: Maclay assigned the capture to the privateer Decatur.)

Nelson encountered Saratoga on 31 January 1813, having sailed from Carlisle Bay five days earlier. Nelson and Saratoga fought for about four hours before Nelson struck when about 20 leagues to windward of Jamaica. Saratoga mounted 16 guns and had a crew of 130 men.

On 6 February Captain W.C. Wooster of Saratoga put the crew and passengers on a boat by which the 17 people reached Grand Caymanas. There they hired a schooner that on the 14th delivered them to Lucea.

Reportedly, Nelson was in sight of Jamaica for three days before Saratoga sent Nelson into New Orleans.

Nelson's entry in Lloyd's Register for 1814 carried the annotation "captured".
