= Isabella (1773 ship) =

British merchantman and whaler 1793–1813

History

Great Britain
- Name: Isabella
- Builder: America
- Launched: 1793
- Fate: Last listed 1813

General characteristics
- Tons burthen: 349 (bm)
- Armament: 6 × 9-pounder guns

Isabella was launched in 1773 in America, possibly under another name. She appeared in United Kingdom sources in 1802 and between 1802 and 1810 she made nine annual voyages as a whaler in the northern whale fishery (Davis Strait (DS) and Greenland (Gr)). She was last listed in 1813 with data unchanged since 1810.

== Career ==
Isabella first appeared in the Register of Shipping (RS) in 1804. By then she had been sailing out of Newcastle as a whaler for some time.

Year	Master	Owner	Trade	Source & notes
1804	Clarke	Humble	Newcastle–Davis Strait	RS; thorough repair 1794 & 1802

Year	Master	Where	"Fish" (Whales)	Tuns blubber
1802	Clark	DS	12	219
1803			13	270.25
1804		DS	11	157
1805	Clark	DS	13 or 19	267.5
1806	Clark		3	82.5
1807	Clark	DS	7	167.5 or 192, + 5 tons of fins
1808	Lambert	DS	15	152.25

In 1805 one of the whales that Isabella had killed was one of the largest whales ever caught.

When Isabella returned home to Newcastle in 1808 one of her crewmen lost his arm. The arm was shot off when he fired a cannon to signal her arrival.

On 17 December 1808 HMS Briseis towed Isabella, of Newcastle, Lambert, master, into Harwich. Isabella had been sailing from Calmar to Hull when she became distressed. she had five feet of water in her hold, part of her cargo and guns had been thrown overboard, and her foreyard and her sails from the foreyard had been cut down. Her crew had been about to take to her boats and abandon her when Briseis came on the scene.

Year	Master	Where	"Fish" (Whales)	Tuns blubber
1809	Johnson	Gr	15	300
1810			21	322.25

Year	Master	Owner	Trade	Source & notes
1810	Clarke	Humble	Newcastle–Davis Strait	RS; thorough repair 1806

== Fate ==
Isabella was last listed in the Register of Shipping in 1813, with data unchanged since 1810.
