= French brig Nettuno (1807) =

UK naval brig and whaler 1808–1831

Nettuno
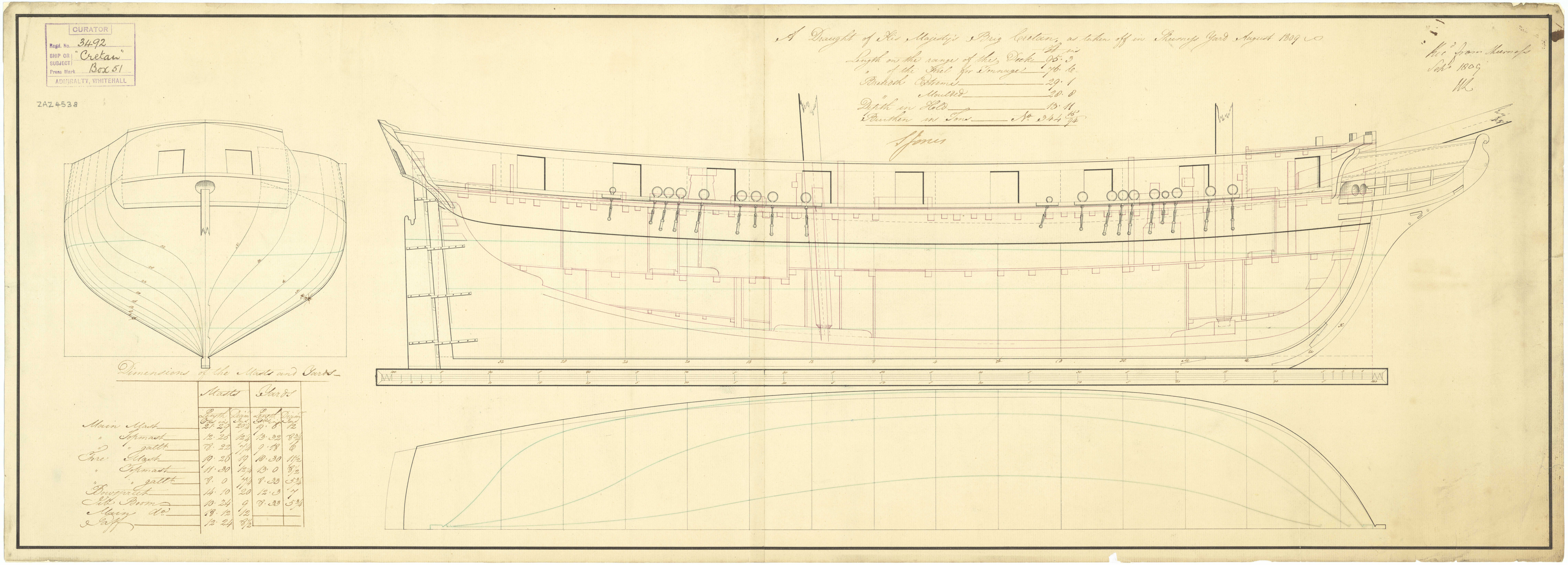
- Nettuno/HMS Cretan. Plan showing the body plan with stern board outline, sheerlines with inboard detail and scroll figurehead, and longitudinal half-breadth, as taken off at Sheerness Dockyard. Drawing from August-early September 1809.

History

France
- Name: Nettuno
- Namesake: Neptune
- Builder: Venice
- Laid down: December 1806
- Launched: 12 April 1807
- Captured: 1 June 1808

United Kingdom
- Name: Cretan
- Acquired: 1 June 1808 by capture
- Fate: Sold 29 September 1814

United Kingdom
- Name: Cretan
- Owner: Alexander Birnie
- Acquired: 29 September 1814 by purchase
- Fate: Last listed in Lloyd's Register in 1834

General characteristics
- Displacement: 360 tons
- Tons burthen: 34419/94, or 356 (bm)
- Length: 95 ft 3 in (29.03 m) (overall); 76 ft 6 in (23.32 m) (keel)
- Beam: 29 ft 1 in (8.86 m)
- Draught: 3.55 m (11.6 ft) (unloaded)
- Depth of hold: 13 ft 11 in (4.24 m)
- Sail plan: Brig
- Complement: French service:112; British service:100
- Armament: French service: 14 × 24-pounder carronades + 2 × 6 or 12-pounder chase guns; British service: 14 × 24-pounder carronades + 2 × 9-pounder chase guns; Whaler: 8 × 9-pounder carronades

Nettuno was a French Illyrien or Friedland-class brig built at Venice and launched in June 1807. HMS Unite captured her a year later off Zara. The Royal Navy took her into service as HMS Cretan. She served in the Mediterranean. She was sold in 1814. Between 1815 and 1831 she made five voyages as a whaler.

== French brig ==
Nettuno was launched in April 1807 with Eugène de Beauharnais in attendance. She was at Venice in November, and Lesina and Ancona in May 1808.

== Capture ==
Unite took shelter from a gale between 28 and 31 July under Lusin on the Dalmatian coast. Late in the afternoon of the 31st, near Premuda, she sighted three enemy naval brigs. Captain Campbell set out in chase and around 3am found himself with in two miles of two of the brigs. Suddenly he sighted he saw the third; Unite steered to pass by the third and while within pistol-shot, gave the brig a broadside, which caused the brig to surrender without a shot being fired, her crew having taken refuge below decks. Unite sent boats that secured the brig and then set out after her two companions. There was little wind so the brigs made use of their sweeps and it was only around 7a.m. that Unite was able to catch up with the larger, and more laggardly of the brigs. This vessel, seeing no chance to escape, fired a broadside, struck her colours, and ran onto the shore, where Unite took possession. The third brig escaped. The two captured brigs turned out to be Nettuno and Teulié, both of sixteen "Thirty-Two-Pounders, Brass Carronades", and 115 men each. The brigs had been sent to find and take Unite, the French having heard that she had so many men sick that she would be easy prey. Although Unite had no casualties, the two French brigs were less fortunate. Nettuno had seven men killed, two drowned, and 13 wounded; Teuliè had five men killed and 16 wounded.

== HMS Cretan ==
The Royal Navy commissioned Nettuno in the Mediterranean as Cretan, under Commander Charles F. Payne. He would remain her commander throughout her service.

Between 13 July and 1 December 1809 Cretan was at Sheerness, undergoing repairs.

Cretan participated in the unsuccessful Walcheren Campaign, a British expedition to the Netherlands in 1809 intended to open another front in the Austrian Empire's struggle with France during the War of the Fifth Coalition. Around 40,000 soldiers, 15,000 horses together with field artillery and two siege trains crossed the North Sea and landed at Walcheren on 30 July. This was the largest British expedition of that year, larger than the army serving in the Peninsular War in Portugal. The campaign involved little fighting, but heavy losses from the sickness popularly dubbed "Walcheren Fever". Over 4,000 British troops died (only 106 in combat) and the rest withdrew on 9 December 1809. During the withdrawal operations, Commodore G.W.C.R. Owen, who was in actual command, shifted his pennant to Cretan the better to oversee the operations.

After the Walcharen Campaign Cretan served in the North Sea and Baltic.

On 28 October 1810 Cretan captured the Danish privateer Neptune. Neptune was armed with five guns, had a crew of 24 men, and had left Schelling the day before; she had taken no prizes before Cretan captured her. Neptune arrived at Dover on 7 November. Cretan and Desiree shared in the proceeds of the capture, on 25 December 1811, of the Vrow Alida.

Between 29 July and 4 August 1812, Musquito captured several Dutch fishing boats: Gute Verwagting, Tobie Maria, Jonge Maria, Jeannette, Femme Elizabeth, Hoop (alias Esperance), and the Rondwich. By agreement, Musquito shared the prize money with Desiree, Banterer and Cretan.

On 17 September Indefatigable, Hearty, Desiree, Drake, Primrose, and Cretan shared in the capture of the Dankbarheide. When the gun-brig Hearty detained the Prussian vessel Friede on 29 September, Indefatigable, Desiree, Primrose, Cretan, Drake, were either in company or sharing by agreement.

Cretan captured two fishing boats, Harmonie and Stadt Embden, on 16 January 1813. (Note: A first-class share of the prize money was worth £57 5s 2 1/2d; a sixth-class share, that of an ordinary seaman, was worth £1 8s 3 3/4d, or about five weeks' wages.)

Then on 28 February Cretan captured Erineron, Nessen, master, which had been sailing from Bergen to Stettin, and sent her into Yarmouth.

Cretan and Leveret were in company on 12 March and so shared in the proceeds of the capture of the Danish vessel Aurora. Two days later, Cretan captured Anna Brauer. That same day Prospero captured Najaden, and later Cretan and Raven shared in the proceeds by agreement.

On 1 March 1814, Antelope and a Russian frigate forced the channel between Flushing and Cadsand, but Antelope then grounded off the Hoogplaat. She was stuck for 41 hours,. For 36 of those hours Nymphen, Banterer, and Cretan protected her and worked to free her. Eventually, a tide floated Antelope off.

=== Disposal ===
Commander Payne received promotion to post-captain on 7 June 1814. The Principal Officers and Commissioners of the Navy offered the "Cretan sloop, of 344 tons", lying at Deptford for sale on 29 September 1814. Cretan sold on that day for £1,020.

== Whaler ==
Alexander Birnie purchased Cretan and she made five voyages between 1815 and 1831 as a whaler. (Note: When registering her with Lloyd's Register, her new owner gave her place of origin as the island of Crete, a mistake that remained on the records until she left the Register. The 1815 volume of Lloyd's Register initially gave her name as Crighton, which was corrected to Cretan. The 1815 volume of the Register of Shipping gave it as Creation, which too was later corrected.)

Cretan first appeared in Lloyd's Register (LR) in 1815.

| Year | Master | Owner | Trade | Source |
|---|---|---|---|---|
| 1815 | J.Moore | Burne | London–Port Jackson | LR |

For Cretan's first whaling voyage, Captain Joseph Moore left London on 18 April 1815 for New South Wales. She reached Port Jackson on 7 September, having sailed around the bottom of Tasmania. She left Sydney on 12 October to commence whaling around New Zealand. In December 1816 she was off the west coast of South America. She returned to Britain on 5 May 1817 with a full cargo of whale oil.

Cretan, Samuel Shrewsbury, master, left Britain on 7 September 1817 on her second whaling voyage, bound for the Galapagos. She was reported there in November 1819. She returned to Britain on 21 July 1820.

H. R. Gulliver (or Galloway) sailed Cretan on her third whaling voyage, leaving Britain on 13 January 1821. She was at Tahiti on 24 February 1822;, and Valparaiso on 14 October. She returned to Britain on 20 May 1823 with 500 casks of oil.

Captain Gulliver was still master of Cretan on her fourth whaling voyage, sailing her on 3 September 1823 from Britain, bound for the "Japans". (Note: The voyage occurred during Japan's Edo period, when Japan still followed a policy of strict isolationism, forbidding the entry to her ports of almost all foreign vessels.) Cretan reached the Cape of Good Hope around 14 November. She was reported to be off the coast of Japan in June–July 1824 with 500 barrels. She returned to Britain on 18 December 1826 with 420 casks of oil.

Cretan left Britain on 16 March 1827 on her fifth (and last recorded) whaling voyage with H. R. Gulliver, master, and destination the Sandwich Islands and Timor. Cretan was at Tahiti from 25 August to 21 September 1827. On 18 April 1828 she was at Oahu. Her master arrived at Singapore on 26 August 1828, accusing his chief mate and crew of having mutinied and dispossessed him of his vessel. (During her voyage Stephen Reynolds (or Samuel Reynolds) replaced Gulliver as master.) Cretan was at Honolulu from 29 October to 4 December 1829 with 1110 barrels. She returned to Britain on 29 July 1831 with 400 casks of oil.

== Fate ==
Lloyd's Register (1834) still listed Cretan but with no information beyond her burthen and location (London). She was no longer listed in 1835.
