= HMS Portia (1810) =

Naval brig (1810-1817)

History

United Kingdom
- Name: HMS Portia
- Ordered: 30 March 1807
- Builder: Deptford Dockyard (M/s Robert Nelson)
- Laid down: December 1809
- Launched: 30 August 1810
- Fate: Sold 6 March 1817

General characteristics
- Class & type: Crocus-class brig-sloop
- Type: Brig-sloop
- Tons burthen: 25141/94 (bm)
- Length: Overall: 92 ft (28.0 m); Keel: 72 ft 8 in (22.1 m)
- Beam: 25 ft 7 in (7.8 m)
- Depth of hold: 12 ft 8 in (3.9 m)
- Sail plan: Brig rigged
- Complement: 86
- Armament: 2 × 6-pounder bow chasers + 12 × 24-pounder carronades

HMS Portia was a 14-gun Crocus-class brig of the Royal Navy that was launched in 1810. She had a relatively uneventful career before the Navy sold her in 1817 for breaking up.

== Career ==
Commander Joseph Symes commissioned Portia in September 1810 for the North Sea.

In July 1811 Lloyd's List reported that Rebecca, Robloff, master, had arrived at Yarmouth after Portia had detained her.

Commander Henry Thompson recommissioned her in August 1811. Early in September 1811, Primus, carrying tar and hemp, Worksam, in ballast, Experiment, carrying iron, Columbus, carrying linseed, Neptunus, carrying timber, and Hector, carrying sundry goods, came into Yarmouth. They were prizes to HMS Tremendous, Ranger, Calypso, Algerine, Musquito, Earnest. and Portia. On 14 August 1812 Portia captured the Dutch schuyt Phoenix.

In August 1813 Lieutenant William Adams took temporary command.

On 18 September 1814, she departed Plymouth with a squadron, led by the capital ships Bedford and Norge, that carried the advance guard of Major General John Keane's army, destined for North America. On 3 November 1814, she arrived at Bermuda, carrying dispatches.

On 26 February 1815, she departed Bermuda, arriving at Barbados on 18 March 1815. On 21 March, she set sail for Trinidad and Tobago with the convoy. On 27 April 1815 Lieutenant Silas Thomson Hood was promoted to Commander; he commissioned Portia for the Halifax station. She was moored at Bermuda between 4 May and 12 May 1815. She was ordered to remain in North America. On 29 July 1815 Portia captured the sloop Sylph at Bermuda. (Note: A first-class share of the prize money was worth £3 16s 3 3/4d; a sixth-class share, that of an ordinary seaman, was worth 3s 2 1/4d.) On 26 August 1815 she arrived at Bermuda. On 14 November 1815, she sailed to New Providence.

On 1 May 1816 Commander John Wilson was appointed to command of Portia, still on the Halifax Station, to take her back to England. Portia sailed for England on 16 July 1816 and was paid off in August, after having arrived in Portsmouth on 7 August 1816.

== Fate ==
The "Principal Officers and Commissioners of His Majesty's Navy" offered Portia for sale on 30 January 1817 at Sheerness. She finally sold on 6 March 1817 to Mr. Marclark for £800 for breaking up.
