= HMS Banterer (1810) =

Naval brig (1810-1817)

History

United Kingdom
- Name: HMS Banterer
- Ordered: 19 September 1809
- Builder: Woolwich Dockyard (M/s Edward Sison)
- Laid down: December 1809
- Launched: 2 June 1810
- Fate: Sold 6 March 1817

General characteristics
- Class & type: Crocus-class brig-sloop
- Type: Brig-sloop
- Tons burthen: 25141/94 (bm)
- Length: Overall: 92 ft (28.0 m); Keel: 72 ft 8 in (22.1 m)
- Beam: 25 ft 7 in (7.8 m)
- Depth of hold: 12 ft 8 in (3.9 m)
- Sail plan: Brig rigged
- Complement: 86
- Armament: 2 × 6-pounder bow chasers + 12 × 24-pounder carronades
- Notes: Some of Banterer's floor timbers and futtocks were made from Holstein oak.

HMS Portia was a 14-gun Crocus-class brig of the Royal Navy that was launched in 1810. The Navy sold her in 1817 for breaking up after an uneventful career.

== Career ==
Commander Charles Warde was appointed to Banterer on 9 June 1810. He commissioned her for the North Sea.

Between 29 July and 4 August 1811, HMS Musquito captured several Dutch fishing boats: Gute Verwagting, Tobie Maria, Jonge Maria, Jeannette, Femme Elizabeth, Hoop (alias Esperance), and the Rondwich. By agreement, Musquito shared the prize money with Desiree, Banterer, and Cretan.

On 10 August 1811 Banterer recaptured Fortuna.

Commander Warde was promoted to post captain on 18 September 1815.

== Fate ==
The "Principal Officers and Commissioners of His Majesty's Navy" offered Banterer for sale on 30 January 1817 at Deptford. She finally sold on 6 March 1817 to Gordon & Co. for £850 for breaking up.
