= French brig Teulié =

French Navy ship

Teulié
History

France
- Name: Teulié
- Namesake: Scuola Militare Teulié
- Builder: Venice
- Laid down: June 1807
- Launched: April 1808
- Captured: 1 June 1808

United Kingdom
- Name: Roman
- Acquired: 1 June 1808 by capture
- Fate: Sold 1 September 1814

General characteristics
- Displacement: 360 tons (French)
- Tons burthen: 33242/94 (bm)
- Length: 97 ft 3 in (29.6 m) (overall); 76 ft 6 in (23.3 m) (keel)
- Beam: 28 ft 7 in (8.7 m)
- Draught: 3.50 m (11.5 ft) (unloaded)
- Depth of hold: 4.38 m (14.4 ft)
- Sail plan: Brig
- Complement: French service:112; British service:100
- Armament: French service: 14 × 24-pounder carronades + 2 × 6 or 12-pounder chase guns; British service: 14 × 24-pounder carronades + 2 × 6-pounder chase guns

Teulié was a French Illyrien or Friedland-class brig built at Venice and launched in April 1808. HMS Unite captured her some two months later off Zara. The Royal Navy took her into service as HMS Roman. She served in the Mediterranean. She was sold in 1814.

== Capture ==
Unite took shelter from a gale between 28 and 31 July 1808 under Lusin on the Dalmatian coast. Late in the afternoon of the 31st, near Premuda, she sighted three enemy naval brigs. Captain Campbell set out in chase and around 3am found himself with in two miles of two of the brigs. Suddenly he sighted he saw the third; Unite steered to pass by the third and while within pistol-shot, gave the brig a broadside, which caused the brig to surrender without a shot being fired, her crew having taken refuge below decks. Unite sent boats that secured the brig and then set out after her two companions. There was little wind so the brigs made use of their sweeps and it was only around 7a.m. that Unite was able to catch up with the larger, and more laggardly of the brigs. This vessel, seeing no chance to escape, fired a broadside, struck her colours, and ran onto the shore, where Unite took possession. The third brig escaped. The two captured brigs turned out to be Nettuno and Teulié, both of sixteen "Thirty-Two-Pounders, Brass Carronades", and 115 men each. The brigs had been sent to find and take Unite, the French having heard that she had so many men sick that she would be easy prey. Although Unite had no casualties, the two French brigs were less fortunate. Nettuno had seven men killed, two drowned, and 13 wounded; Teuliè had five men killed and 16 wounded.

== HMS Roman ==
Roman, circa April 1809, was under the command of Commander Samuel Fowell, late of the sloop Fara Numa.

The Royal Navy commissioned Teulié in the Mediterranean as Roman, under Commander William Whorwood (or Whorgood) in 1810. He sailed her to Portsmouth, leaving Gibraltar on 11 October, escorting 17 merchant vessels. The convoy put in at Lisbon on 17 October.

Roman arrived at Portsmouth on 28 November. She left on a cruise on 8 December, and returned on 29 December. During that cruise she assisted Diana. Diana had participated in an attack on a French frigate squadron anchored at Saint-Vaast-la-Hougue at the action of 15 November 1810, which ultimately led to the destruction of the Elisa. On 24 December Diana sent in her boats, which succeeded in setting Elisa, which had run ashore, on fire. Roman's contribution to the event was to provide "Two Kegs of the combustible Matter".

== Fate ==
Roman was paid off in January 1811, and then went into ordinary, where she remained in 1812–13. The Principal Officers and Commissioners of the Navy offered "Roman, of 333 tons", lying at Portsmouth for sale on 1 September 1814. Roman sold there on that day for £500.
