= HMS Musquito (1804) =

Brig-sloop of the Royal Navy

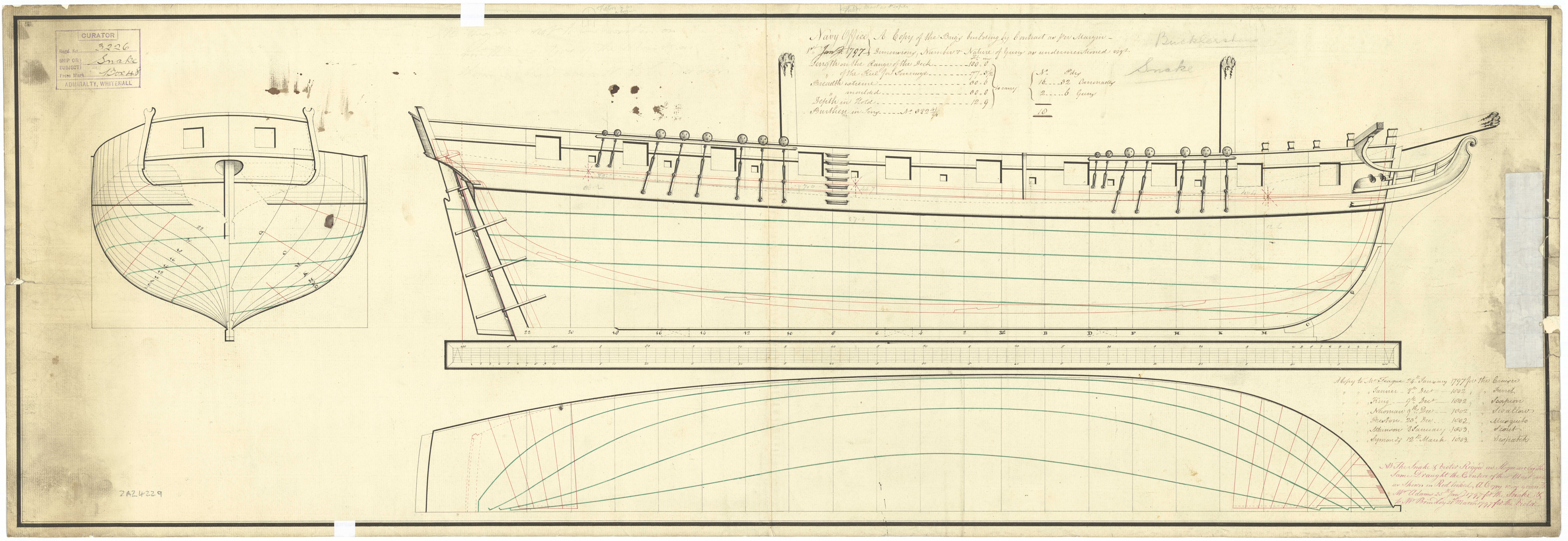
- Musquito

History

United Kingdom
- Name: HMS Musquito
- Ordered: 27 November 1802
- Laid down: May 1803
- Launched: 4 September 1804
- Fate: Sold 1822

General characteristics
- Class & type: Cruizer-class brig-sloop
- Tons burthen: 384 51/94 bm
- Length: 100 ft 0 in (30.5 m) (gundeck); 77 ft 3 1/2 in (23.6 m) (keel)
- Beam: 30 ft 7 in (9.3 m)
- Depth of hold: 12 ft 9 in (3.9 m)
- Sail plan: Brig-rigged
- Complement: 20
- Armament: 16 × 32-pounder carronades; 2 × 9-pounder bow chasers

HMS Musquito (or Mosquito). was a Royal Navy Cruizer-class brig-sloop built by John Preston at Great Yarmouth and launched in 1804. She was commissioned in October 1804 under Commander Samuel Jackson. She served in the North Sea and the Baltic, and Jackson supervised the first successful rocket attack in Europe at Boulogne in 1806. After the war she served off Africa and captured some slavers. She was broken up in 1822, having been laid up since 1818.

== North Sea and Baltic ==
On 28 December 1804 Musquito sent into Yarmouth Roads a large smuggling vessel carrying 1400 half-ankers of liquor, and some tobacco. The smuggler was the former King George Packet that the Dutch had detained at the beginning of the war. Lloyd's List (LL) had reported on 31 May 1803 that Earl of Leicester, Princess Royal, and King George Packet had been detained at Helvöet. The vessel was named Aurora and she and her cargo were sold at auction on 9 July 1805.

On 26 March 1805 Musquito was in company with HMS Blazer and Ariadne when they captured the Prussian brig Fortuna.

On 27 March Musquito was with Ariadne and the gun-brig Monkey when they captured Vrow Cornelia, R.R. Cruzenga, master. On 7 April Musquito, Monkey, Bold and Urgent captured Bradford. Two days later, Musquito and Ariadne, and the gun-brigs Blazer, Bold, and Furious captured Anna Margaretha, Klinkammer, master. On 14 April Musquito, Ariadne, Monkey, and Blazer captured the merchant vessel Elizabeth Anna. Then on 5 June Musquito was among the vessels that shared in the capture of Prospere, J.G. Huret, Master. Almost two months later, on 28 July, many of the same vessels shared in the capture of Jonge Jacob.

Musquito was 13 miles (21 km) off Scarborough on 12 April when Jackson saw two ships firing their guns at a third. Jackson caught up with the quarry, which turned out to be a sloop from Guernsey carrying contraband goods. Her captain informed Jackson his pursuers were French privateers. Jackson sailed in pursuit and captured one of the privateers at midday and the other early the following morning.

The privateers were the Dutch-built doggers Orestes and Pylades. Each was armed with a 24-pounder carronade and six swivel guns and had a crew of 33 men. They had been at sea for three weeks, flying false Prussian colours. Their plan had been to attack merchant shipping off Scotland, but bad weather had foiled them. Musquito sent both into Yarmouth.

Later that year Musquito escorted transports carrying some 5,000 troops to Lord Cathcart's army in Hanover. By trusting his judgment over that of the pilots he was ordered to use, Jackson saved the convoy from grounding on the Haak Sand off Texel, although one transport did ground with the result that the Dutch captured her and the 250 men of the Fifth Regiment of Foot she was carrying. (Note: Marshall states that the vessel was the frigate Helder, converted to a transport This is not consistent with Winfield unless the frigate in question is HMS Helder, which the Admiralty had sold in 1802. Marshall also gives the number of troops as 500, whereas the Regiment records it as 250.) Later, Musquito drove five French armed schooners ashore on the Calais-Boulogne coast.

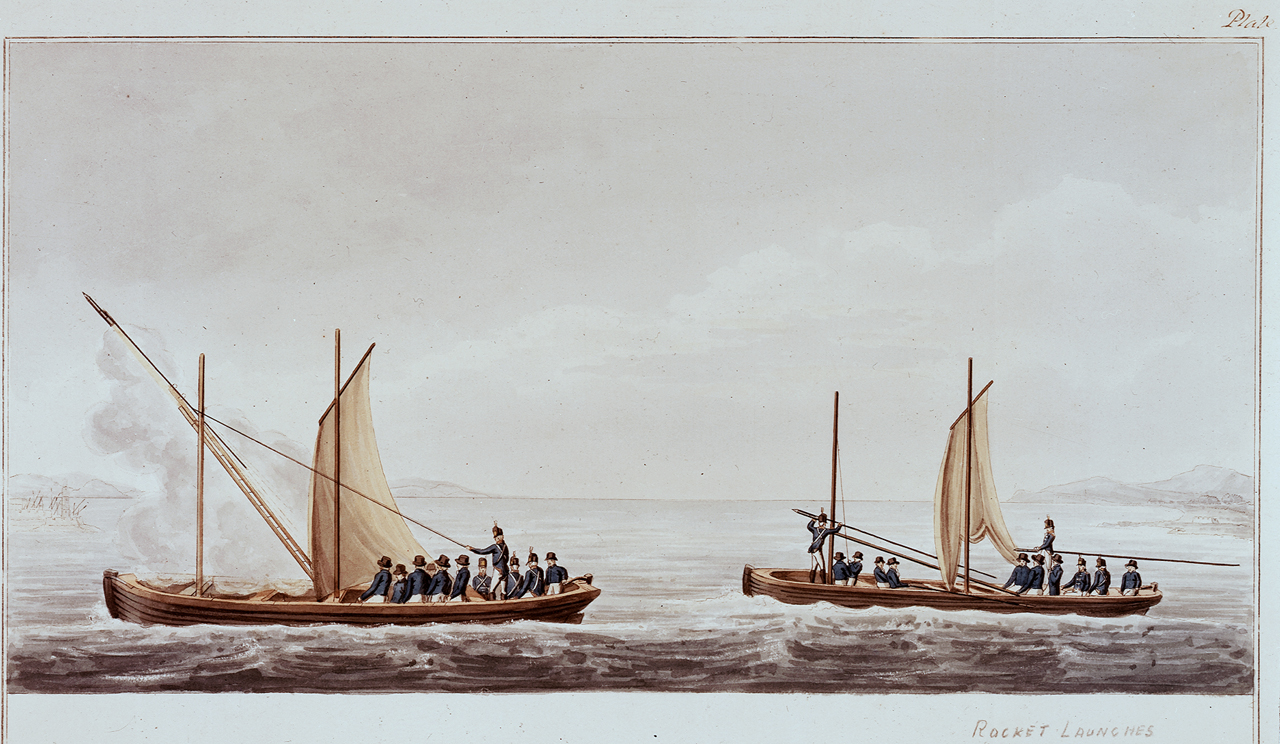
"Use of rocket's from boats" - An illustration from William Congreve's book.

During Commodore Edward Owen's rocket attack on the French flotilla at Boulogne in October 1806, Jackson directed the boats firing 32-pound (14.5 kg) Congreve rockets. As night drew in on the Channel, 24 cutters fitted with rocket frames formed a line and fired some 400 rockets at Boulogne. The barrage took only 30 minutes. Apparently, the attack set a number of fires but otherwise had limited effect. Still, the effect was enough to lead the British to employ rockets on a number of further occasions. This was the first successful use of rocket artillery in Europe. An earlier attack on Boulogne in November 1805 had been a complete failure with the rockets not even reaching the town.

Musquito joined the expedition to Copenhagen in October 1806 where she was stationed in the Belt to prevent supplies reaching Zealand.

In June 1807 Mosquito captured Jeune Adolphe, M. Combet, Master. Musquito shared in the prize money for the capture of Copenhagen on 7 September 1807.

Musquito was recommissioned in October 1807 under Commander William Goate for the North Sea. She next appears in the records in early 1809. In late 1808 or early 1809, Musquito retrieved and brought into Heligoland George, Maddock, master, which had been sailing from London to Heligoland when she ran ashore nearly filled with water. Her crew had deserted her, and her cargo was much damaged.

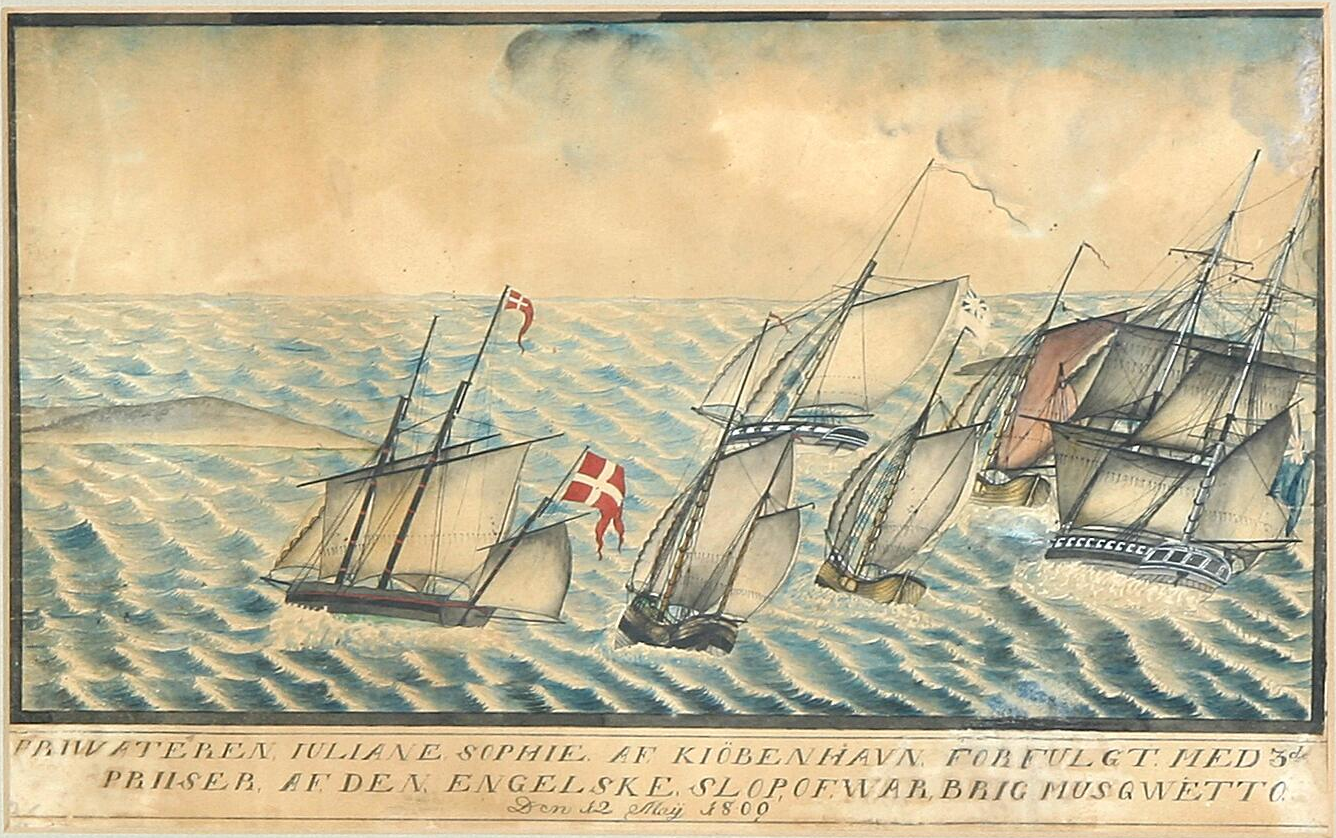
HMS Musquito (to the right) chasing the Danish privateer Juliane Sophie in May 1809. Contemporary watercolour.

Musquito captured the Danish privateers Princess Juliana Sophia on 17 May 1809, and the cutter Sol Fulgen (or Soe Fulgen) of six guns and 24 men off Heligoland on 25 May 1809. (Note: A first-class share of the prize money was worth £46 3s 6 1/2d; a sixth-class share, that of an ordinary seaman, was worth 13s 1 3/4d.)

Musquito may have been in command of the gun-vessel Patriot because on 30 May Lieutenant E.W. Mansel, of Patriot sent a letter to Goate for onward transmission announcing the capture of the Danish cutter privateer Snap. The capture took place in the River Hever. Snap was armed with three guns and had a crew of nine men. She was one week out of Tonningen, but had not captured anything. That same month Mansel advised Goate that Patriot had captured in the Jahde River a Dutch gun-vessel of one gun, some swivel guns, and 10 men, a Danish privateer of one gun, six swivels and 25 men, off Langerooz, and with the hired armed vessel Alert, of the destruction of two French privateers and a sloop in the Jahde.

== Elbe ==
In June 1809 Lord George Stuart gave Goate command of a small force consisting of Musquito, the two Cherokee-class brig-sloops Briseis and Ephira, five gun-brigs, including Basilisk, Centinel, Patriot, and Alert. On 7 July they entered the Elbe. There was a battery at Cuxhaven so they anchored out range of its cannons.

Next morning at daylight Goate led a landing party but before they could attack the battery its 80-man garrison retreated, abandoning their guns. The British then loaded the battery's six 24-pounders into vessels lying in the harbour, together with all the shot and military stores they could find and some other small guns. Next, they blew up the fort and seized two French gunboats, each of two guns. Lastly, the landing party handed the town of Cuxhaven back to the civil governor before returning to its vessels. Later, Mosquito, Basilisk and Aimable would share in the prize money.

On 26 July French cavalry almost captured several British naval officers reconnoitering the village of Ritzbuttle. Lord Stuart responded by sending a detachment to meet the French. However, Stuart then discovered that the French had retreated to Gessendorf, which was some 26 miles (42 km) from Cuxhaven. He sent Goate and a landing party from Mosquito towards Gessendorf. As soon as Goate approached the French they evacuated Gessendorf in requisitioned wagons, while about 60 cavalry covered their retreat. At the same time Stuart had Pettet of Briseis take his men around the flank to capture a battery of four 12-pounders that was firing round shot and grape at Stuart and Captain Watts of Ephira. Before the British arrived, the French artillerymen abandoned their guns, making their escape via boats on the Weser. Still, the British captured the commander of the battery, together with three of his officers or non-commissioned officers. The British then burst the four 12-pounders before they took away the powder. The only British casualty on the entire expedition was Watts, who had been wounded.

On 21 October Musquito was under the command of Commander Robert Petter and in company with the gun-brig Richmond when they captured the galliot Fortuna. On 30 October, Musquito and Richmond captured the Fortuna. Whether these are the same or different vessels is an open question.

== Cruising ==
Musquito was recommissioned in June 1811 under Commander Christopher Bell. Early in September Primus, carrying tar and hemp, Worksam, in ballast, Experiment, carrying iron, Columbus, carrying linseed, Neptunus, carrying timber, and Hector, carrying sundry goods, came into Yarmouth. They were prizes to Tremendous, Ranger, Calypso, Algerine, Musquito, Earnest, and Portia.

In February 1812 Musquito came under the command of Commander James Tomkinson.

On 1 June 1812 Musquito, which was shorthanded, intercepted a group of lobster boats off Heligoland. She then impressed two seamen from the boats. The men and their colleagues sued for their release, and in 1813 were granted a writ of habeas corpus. The argument was that because Britain had taken possession of the island and its fisheries in 1807, the Heligoland fisheries were British possessions and thus fell within a defined statutory exception for "the fisheries of this Kingdom".

Between 29 July and 4 August, Musquito captured several Dutch fishing boats: Gute Verwagting, Tobie Maria, Jonge Maria, Jeannette, Femme Elizabeth, Hoop (alias Esperance), and the Rondwich. By agreement, Musquito shared the prize money with Desiree, Banterer, and Cretan.

On 7 August 1812 Musquito was at Yarmouth, having captured three Dutch prizes off the Dogger Bank. These were Jonge Maria, Jonge Dirk, and Saloritta, all carrying saltfish.

On 11 February 1813, the schooner Barbara, with Musquito in company, recaptured the Neptune. (Note: A first-class share of the salvage money, net of the Flag Officer's share, was worth £12 8s 8d; a sixth-class share, that of an ordinary seaman, was worth 3s 9d.) On 24 April 1813 Musquito sailed for the Leeward Islands.

On 11 February 1814, Musquito, still under Tomkinson's command, detained the American brig Halligren in the river of Surinam. Halligren was condemned under droit of admiralty and prize money was awarded. (Note: His Majesty's grant of "one moiety" was made on 8 March 1817. A first-class share, net of the Flag Officer's share, was worth £24 2s 8d; a sixth-class share was worth 10s 10 1/2d.)

Then on 30 June Musquito captured the slaver Manuella, which was carrying a cargo of slaves. Manuella was sailing under Spanish colours and was on her way to Puerto Rico with "500 Negros" when Musquito captured her and sent her into Tortola. Perhaps because of the head money for the slaves, the prize money involved was quite substantial. (Note: A first-class share, net of the Flag Officer's share, was worth £1319 1s 7d; a sixth-class share was worth £31 16s 6d.) On 6 July Musquito captured the ship Sophia. (Note: A first-class share, net of the Flag Officer's share, was worth £188 0s 8d; a sixth-class share was worth £4 12s 9d.)

== Post-war ==
On 26 February 1815, Musquito was one of the warships that sailed from St. Thomas as escort to a convoy of 95 vessels bound for Great Britain. On 26 June, Panther, Gezoline, master, arrived at Plymouth as a prize to Conway, Musquito, Acteon, Tay, and Prometheus. She had been sailing from Martinique to Dunkirk when the British captured her. On 9 July, Sophia, Westfolm, master, arrived at Plymouth. Musquito had detained Sophia as she was sailing from Trondheim to Rochelle. A few days later Neptune, Horner, master, also arrived at Plymouth. Musquito had detained her as she was sailing from Holland to Rochelle.

On 12 August Commander George Brine was appointed to Musquito from Sheldrake and he took command on 25 August. She then spent several years off Africa, much of the time at St Helena, "guarding Napoleon".

In August 1816 Musquito was at Port Louis, Île de France. While cruising in the vicinity she captured a number of slave vessels, including the schooners Petite Aimée and Helen, and the luggers St. Joseph and Zephyr. The captures of Petite Aimée and St. Joseph occurred on 15 and 17 October 1816. (Note: A first-class share of the bounty on the slaves was worth £695 18s 8d; a fifth-class share, that of an able seaman, was worth £8 16s 2d.) The capture of Zephyr took place on 19 December.

On 7 October 1817 Musquito arrived at the Cape of Good Hope from Île de France. From there she sailed to Saint Helena. She was reported at St Helena on 12 April 1818 and again on 17 August. On 14 November she arrived at Deal from Portsmouth and sailed for the Thames. Brine received promotion to post-captain on 7 December 1818.

== Fate ==
Musquito was paid off at Deptford in 1818. The Principal Officers and Commissioners of His Majesty's Navy first offered the "Mosquito brig, of 18 guns and 384 tons", lying at Deptford, for sale on 13 April 1822. She was sold to Thomas King for £1,050 on 7 May.
