= HMS Earnest (1805) =

Brig of the Royal Navy

History

United Kingdom
- Name: HMS Earnest
- Ordered: June 1804
- Builder: Menzies & Goalen, Leith
- Laid down: August 1804
- Launched: 16 January 1805
- Commissioned: February 1805
- Fate: Sold May 1816

United Kingdom
- Name: Earnest
- Acquired: May 1816 by purchase
- Fate: Last listed 1850

General characteristics
- Class & type: Archer-class gun-brig
- Tons burthen: 1826/94, or 18220/94 bm
- Length: Overall: 80 ft 11 1/8 in (24.7 m); Keel: 66 ft 8 1/8 in (20.3 m), or 65 ft 10 in (20.1 m)
- Beam: 22 ft 8 in (6.9 m), or 22 ft 6 in (6.9 m)
- Depth of hold: 9 ft 5 in (2.9 m)
- Sail plan: Brig
- Complement: 50
- Armament: 10 × 18-pounder carronades

HMS Earnest was launched at Leith in 1805 as one of 48 later Archer-class gun brigs for the British Royal Navy. During her naval career Earnest captured five small privateers and numerous merchant vessels. In 1816 the Admiralty sold her and she became the merchantman Earnest. She continued to sail and was last listed in 1850.

== HMS Earnest ==
In February 1805 Lieutenant Alexander Sinclair commissioned Earnest.

Earnest shared with Active, Griper, Carrier, Mariner, and Minx in the proceeds from the recapture of Francis, Tucker, master, and Betsey on 14 and 15 September.

Earnest was part of the Boulogne flotilla with Cruizer, Minx, Mariner, and Griper, and so all shared in the proceeds of the recapture on 29 September of Rover, of Newcastle, Hillary, master. (Note: A seaman's share of the prize money was 3s 1d.)

Lieutenant Richard Templar replaced Sinclair in 1806. On 14 April Ernest sent into Dover Gute Hoffnung which had been sailing from Hamburg to Caen. On 6 June Earnest was in company with Oberon when they captured Yonge Heinrick H.H. Berg, master. Then on 7 and 8 August, Earnest and Constant captured Frau Teresta and a ship of unknown name. On 25 August 1806 Earnest captured Vrow Luckina, Caper, master.

Between January and February 1809 Earnest underwent fitting by Pitcher, Northfleet. In May Earnest was in Wingo Sound where she captured two sloop-rigged privateers, Four Brothers (or Fire Bredere), of four guns and 22 men, and Mackarel (or Makrel), of two guns and 18 men. On 15 May Superb and Earnest captured Diana, D'Lieb, and Livegierne.

On 28 July Lloyd's List reported that Earnest had recaptured Vriendschap, Kok, master, which had been sailing to the Baltic when a Danish lugger had captured her. Vriendship arrived at Ystad. Earnest also recaptured Emanuel, Tygerfon, master. The prize money notice gives the name of Friendschap's master as L. H. Hok. A later notice gives the date of recapture for Emanuel as 28 September 1808, and that of Friendschap as 2 July 1809.

On 28 July 1810, Earnest captured in the Kattegat a Danish privateer cutter of two guns and 13 men. On 2 October Earnest captured Walusten, and on 13 March 1811 Voranfsehende. This may have been the bark, from Norway, that Earnest captured off the Gallopper Sand.

On 15 June 1811, Earnest's yawl captured a French privateer schuyt of unknown name. The schuyt was armed with six guns and had a crew of 24 men, who escaped ashore. Then on 7 July Earnest captured the French privateer lugger Sacripan, of five guns and 28 men.

Lloyd's List reported on 10 September that Primus, with tar and hemp, Worksam, in ballast, Scaleigh, with corn, Experiment, with iron, Columbus. with linseed. Neptunus, with timber, and Hector, with sundry goods, had all come into Yarmouth. They were prizes to HMS Tremendous, Ranger, Calypso, Algerine, Musquito, Earnest. and Portia.

In June 1814 Lieutenant James Tait replaced Templar.

=== Prize money ===
From roughly 1812 on, the London Gazette started publishing detailed breakdowns of prize money. In the tables below, a First-Class share was that of commander of the vessel, unless the commander was a Lieutenant operating in company with another vessel under the command of a Commander or a Captain. A sixth-class share was that of an Ordinary Seaman. Head money was a bounty paid for each enemy crew member on a warship or privateer.

Date of prize	Name of prize	First-class share (£sd)	Sixth-class share (£sd)	Notes
9 October 1813	Neptunus	£23 6s 3d	4s 4 1/4d	Shared with six other vessels
6 May 1809	Four Brothers; Mackerel	£68 14s 2d	£3 19s 3d	
29 May 1809	Henrietta; Catherina Dorothea	£124 1s 10d	£7 6s 0 1/4	
25 June 1809	Providentia	£13 16s 0d	15s 4 3/4d	
8 March 1813	Ringende Jacob	£42 16s 2d	£2 1s 7 1/2d	
18 March 1813	Anna Maria	£10 1s 10d	9s 9 3/4d	
25 April 1813	Wirksome Swane	£71 7s 2d	£3 10s 2 1/4d	
17 May 1809	Lecergerne; Diana; Liet	£6 8s 4d	5s 1 1/4d	Second-class share not First because shared with Superbe
22 June 1809	Catherina Sophia	£2 0s 7 1/2d	2s	Recapture; Second-class share not First because shared with Princess Caroline
26 September 1808; 1 October 1808	Lystig; Assistenten	£17 4s 0d	8s 2 1/2d (Lystig); 3s 11 1/4d (Assistenten)	Head money
5&6 May 1809	Four Brothers; Mackerel	£39 19s 8d	£1 10s 9d	Head money
2 July 1809	Hertigheden	£7 7s 6d	5s 3d	Head money
28 June 1810; 20 July 1810	Pigeon; Fredenshaab	£22 2s 2d	15s ?d	Head money
6 July 1811	Sacripan	£13 2s 8d	8s 3 3/4d	Head money
19 June to 8 August 1811	Geddan; Maria Helena	£31 4s 4d	£1 11s 6 3/4d	
19 June to 8 August 1811	Gustava, Maria, Maria Fortuna, & Anna Maria	£121 11s 4d	£5 15s 9d	
15 June 1811	French privateer of unknown name	£21 3s 9d	16s 2 1/4d	Head money paid 1829; Lieutenant Templar described as deceased

=== Disposal ===
The "Principal Officers and Commissioners of His Majesty's Navy" announced that on 18 April they would offer for sale a number of vessels, one of them being "Earnest gun-brig, of 182 tons", lying at Deptford.

== Earnest ==
Beatson & Co. purchased Earnest on 2 May 1816 for £600 and retained her name. He also had her rebuilt. She entered Lloyd's Register in 1818 (the Register was not published in 1817), with J. Beatson master and owner, and trade London–Fayal.

On the night of 28 January 1819, Earnest, Beatson, master, ran on shore near Winterton-on-Sea, Norfolk. She was nearly full of water and had previously struck on the Haisborough Sands on her way from Hamburgh to London.

Earnest appeared in the 1820 Register of Shipping with trade London–Bahia. Lloyd's List reported on 1 January 1820 that as she was sailing from Pernambuco to Le Havre she ran aground near Cherbourg. She was expected to be got off.

On 3 December 1825 Earnest, Spooner, master, was reported to be in Memel harbour in a critical state as there was floating ice and strong currents.

Year	Master	Owner	Trade	Source or notes
1825	Beatson; Spooner	Beatson	London–Rio de Janeiro; London-Archangel	Register of Shipping (RS)
1830	Hunter	Chambers	London–Memel	RS; small repairs 1828
1835	Stafford	R. Hart	Newcastle–London	Lloyd's Register (LR); small repairs 1835
1840	Stafford	R. Hart	Newcastle–London	LR; small repairs 1835
1845	Henderson; J. Emery	R. Hart	Newcastle–London; Newcastle–France; Newcastle–Quebec	LR; Large repair in 1843 and 1846
1850	T. Landers	R. Hart	Shields–Baltic	LR; Large repair in 1843 and 1846
