= HMS Centinel (1804) =

British merchant ship (1800–1804) and UK naval sloop (1804–1812)

History

Great Britain
- Name: Friendship
- Launched: 1800, Yarmouth
- Fate: Sold 1804

United Kingdom
- Name: HMS Centinel, or HMS Sentinel
- Acquired: June 1804, by purchase
- Fate: Wrecked 10 October 1812

General characteristics
- Tons burthen: Friendship: 193 (bm); Centinel:194 (bm)
- Length: Overall: 80 ft 10 in (24.6 m); Keel: 63 ft 4 in (19.3 m)
- Beam: 24 ft 0 in (7.3 m)
- Depth of hold: 14 ft 5 1/2 in (4.4 m)
- Sail plan: Brig
- Complement: 45 (Royal Navy)
- Armament: Centinel: 4 × 3-pounder guns; Centinel: 2 × 9-pounder guns + 10 × 18-pounder guns

HMS Centinel, or HMS Sentinel, was launched as the mercantile Friendship in 1800. The Royal Navy purchased her in 1804. She then served in the North Sea until she wrecked in October 1812.

== Friendship ==
Friendship first appeared in Lloyd's Register (LR), in 1800.

Year	Master	Owner	Trade	Source
1800	W.Mason; John Hare	J.Boulter	Yarmouth; London–Bremen	LR
1802	J.Hare; G.Addison	J.Boulter	London–Cork; London–Baltic	LR

== HMS Centinel ==
The Admiralty purchased Friendship in June 1804. She then underwent fitting by Hill, on the Thames, between June and 7 July, and at Deptford until 1 November.

Lieutenant Robert Miln commissioned Centinel in August 1804 for the North Sea.

Lieutenant William Elletson King commanded Centinel from 1806 to her loss in 1812. (In 1807 Lieutenant William Chester assumed temporary command.)

Lloyd's List reported in April 1806 that Centinel had sent into Harwich Union, Vrucat, master, from Harlingen.

In June 1809 Lord George Stuart gave Commander William Goate, captain of HMS Musquito, command of a small force consisting of Musquito, the two Cherokee-class brig-sloops Briseis and Ephira, and five gun-brigs, including Basilisk, Centinel, Patriot, and Alert. On 7 July they entered the Elbe. The landing party captured a battery at Cuxhaven after its garrison had retreated. The British then loaded the battery's six 24-pounders into vessels lying in the harbour, together with all the shot and military stores they could find and some other small guns. Next, they blew up the fort and seized two French gunboats, each of two guns. Lastly, the landing party handed the town of Cuxhaven back to the civil governor before returning to its vessels. Later, the vessels in the squadron shared in the prize money.

At some point between 30 July and 18 August 1809, Centinel participated in the unsuccessful and ill-fated Walcheren Campaign.

On 2 May 1810 HMS Richmond sailed from The Nore as escort to a fleet for Heligoland. She ran aground on the Gunfleet Sands. Centinel came from the Nore on 4 May to take charge of the convoy.

== Fate ==
In October 1812 Centinel was escorting a convoy through the Baltic. After being unable to see land for 36 hours due to the thick weather she laid-to. A violent sea drove Centinel and some of the other vessels on to the north-east end of the island of Rügen. Lieutenant King and his crew threw her guns and stores overboard, and her cutter took out her anchors. During the night enemy troops gathered on the cliffs above her and commenced regular small arms fire. Next morning, although the crew cut away Centinel's masts to further lighten her, it became clear that she could not be saved. The crew fired on the troops on the cliff using small arms, and signal rockets that disconcerted the troops, silencing their fire. The crew set Centinel on fire before they took to her boats. The brig Neptunus then rescued them. A court martial held on board HMS Zealous off Gothenburg on 21 October 1812, acquitted King, his officers, and men.
