= HMS Orestes (1803) =

Sloop of the Royal Navy

History

United Kingdom
- Name: HMS Orestes
- Namesake: Orestes
- Builder: Harwich
- Launched: 1803
- Fate: Wrecked and burnt 11 July 1805

General characteristics
- Class & type: 14-gun brig-sloop
- Tons burthen: 280 bm
- Length: Overall:110 ft 0 in (33.5 m); Keel:72 ft 2 1/2 in (22.0 m)
- Beam: 27 ft 0 in (8.2 m)
- Depth of hold: 11 ft 8 in (3.6 m)
- Sail plan: Ship-sloop
- Complement: 80
- Armament: 14 × 24-pounder carronades

HMS Orestes was a mercantile vessel, possible Ann, that the Royal Navy purchased in 1803. She had a short operational career; her crew burnt her in 1805 after she ran aground to prevent the enemy from capturing her.

== Career ==
With the resumption of war with France in 1803, Britain needed a large number of unrated vessels to protect convoys from privateers, and themselves to impede French coastal commerce. One solution was the hired armed vessels; another was the purchasing of merchantmen and arming them. Orestes was a mercantile vessel brought into the Navy and armed more heavily than she would be were she a cargo ship.

The Navy in August 1803 purchased a mercantile vessel, possibly named Ann, and fitted her for naval service between September and November at Woolwich. Commander Thomas Browne commissioned Orestes in August 1803.

On 29 August 1804 the armed defense ship Atlas and Orestes departed the Downs for off Boulogne.

On 23 October HMS Basilisk was in company with Immortalite and Orestes when they found three praams, seven brigs and 15 luggers off Cap Gris Nez. The French convoy was sailing westward and keeping close inshore under cover of the batteries and an escort of horse artillery that followed them as they made their way to the Banc de Laine. Immortalite closed with the praams under the high land of Cap Blanc Nez, with Orestes and Basilisk joining in the attack. The running fight lasted for more than an hour before the falling tide forced the British to seek deeper water. The French convoy escaped, though possibly with some losses of men. Immortalite herself suffered one man killed, three men mortally wounded and eight others wounded.

== Fate ==
On 11 July 1805 Orestes ran aground on the Splitter Sands off Gravelines. She had been reconnoitering Dunkirk harbour and was heading back out to see when she struck the ground. The crew lightened her and sent up distress signals. HMS Cruizer and two gun-brigs came up to assist but to no avail. Orestes settled further into the mud as the tide began to ebb, while French gunboats could be seen getting underway in the harbour. Orestes' crew took to her boats and Captain Browne set fire to her as he left to prevent the French capturing her.
