= HMS Algerine (1810) =

History

United Kingdom
- Name: HMS Algerine
- Ordered: 2 October 1809
- Builder: John King, Upnor
- Laid down: November 1809
- Launched: 3 March 1810
- Completed: By 20 June 1810
- Fate: Wrecked on 20 May 1813

General characteristics
- Class & type: Pigmy-class schooner
- Tons burthen: 196 73/94 (bm)
- Length: 82 ft 10 in (25.2 m) (overall); 70 ft 8 3/8 in (21.5 m) (keel)
- Beam: 22 ft 10 1/2 in (7.0 m)
- Depth of hold: 10 ft 1 in (3.1 m)
- Propulsion: Sails
- Sail plan: schooner
- Complement: 60
- Armament: 10 × 12-pounder carronades

HMS Algerine was a Pigmy–class 10-gun schooner of the Royal Navy. She was launched in March 1810. She served in the North Sea and then transferred to the West Indies, where she was wrecked in 1813.

== Career ==
Algerine was commissioned in April 1810 under Lieutenant John Aitken Blow. She served initially in the Downs. On 30 March 1811, Algerine, under the command of Lieutenant Thomas Greenwood, seized the smuggling vessel Mandamus. The account in the London Gazette refers to Algerine as a cutter.

On 13 July 1811, Algerine, again under Blow, and the 12-gun brig-sloop Brev Drageren, under Thomas Barker Devon, engaged three Danish brigs in Long Sound, Norway, the 20-gun Lolland, the 18-gun Lougen, and the 16-gun Kiel. (Note: James reports that the three Danish vessels were the 20-gun Langeland, the 18-gun Lügum, and the 16-gun Kiel. However, the Danish records give the names as above, and there are no Danish records of any vessel with the name Lügum, or anything like it other than Lougen, Furthermore, one may infer from a biography of the captain of Langeland that she was not present at the action.) The Danes had 54 guns and 480 men, against the British 22 guns and 107 men; (Note: The Naval Chronicle gives the Danish strength as 60 guns (all long 18-pounders), and 550 men, outnumbered and outgunned, the British vessels took flight.)

The next day Brev Drageren unsuccessfully re-engaged first one and then two of the brigs. In the inconclusive engagement each British vessel sustained one man killed and Brev Drageren also had three wounded. In the second day’s fight, Algerine sent a boat with ten men and sweeps to Brev Drageren, which helped her escape the Danes, though not until after her crew had rowed for 30 hours.

On 15 July the gun-brig Wrangler, under Lieutenant J.B. Pettit (or Pettet), captured the Danish sloop Experiment, P. Loft, Master. Algerine shared in the prize money by agreement.

Early in September 1811, Primus, carrying tar and hemp, Worksam, in ballast, Experiment, carrying iron, Columbus, carrying linseed, Neptunus, carrying timber, and Hector, carrying sundry goods, came into Yarmouth. They were prizes to HMS Tremendous, Ranger, Calypso, Algerine, Musquito, Earnest, and Portia.

In October, a court martial dismissed Blow from Algerine after he challenged a Captain Campbell of the Marines to a duel. Brenton suggests that this saved Blow from a serious investigation for his lack of aggressiveness in the action. However, Clowes et al. dispute this. Admiral Sir James Saumarez had transmitted to Blow the acknowledgments of the Board of Admiralty for his skillful manoeuvres, which detached the remainder of the enemy's force, and for his exertions in facilitating the subsequent escape of himself and consort. On 19 February 1813, Blow received an appointment to the Impress service at Folkestone, where he remained until August 1813. He then resumed his naval career, reaching the rank of captain in 1842.

Blow's successor was Lieutenant Daniel Carpenter, who took command in November 1811. He sailed Algerine to the West Indies on 13 May 1812. On 8 February 1813, she was in an action with an American privateer that escaped, in which the British lost three men killed and seven or eight wounded. This single-ship action may have been with the American privateer Saratoga. Algerine returned to port in Jamaica, while Saratoga went on to capture the 600-ton (bm) merchant vessel Nelson.

== Fate ==
Algerine escorted a convoy from Jamaica into the Atlantic via the Crooked Island Passage in the Bahamas. As she was returning to Jamaica, she was wrecked on the Little Bahama Bank on 20 May 1813 when a heavy swell pushed her off course. Although her crew had to abandon her, they and a large quantity of stores were saved and taken to New Providence.
