= HMS Tremendous =

Ship of the line of the Royal Navy

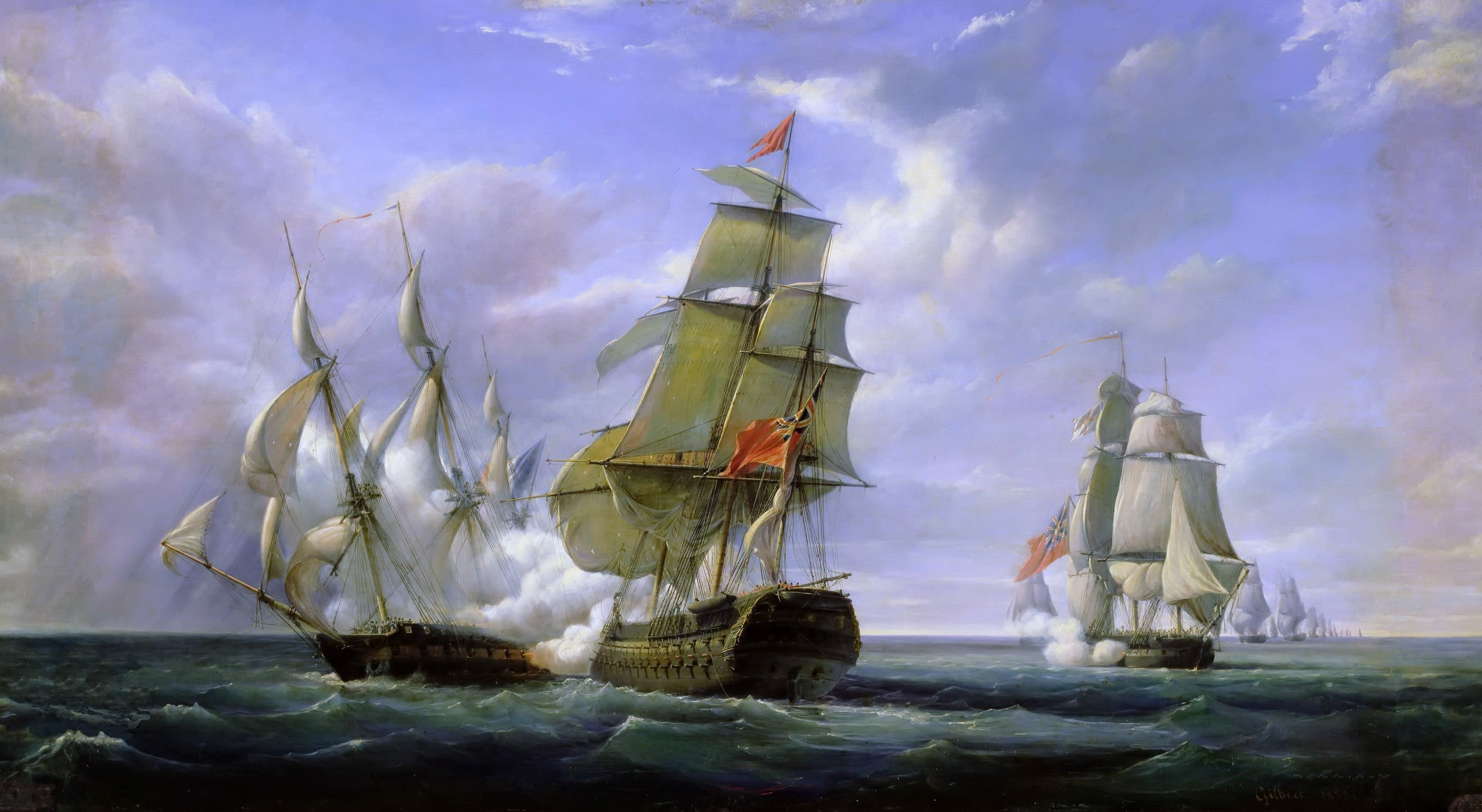
- Tremendous (centre) at the action of 21 April 1806

History

Great Britain
- Name: HMS Tremendous
- Ordered: 1 January 1782
- Builder: Barnard, Deptford
- Laid down: August 1782
- Launched: 30 October 1784
- Renamed: HMS Grampus, 1845
- Fate: Sold, 1897

General characteristics as built
- Class & type: Ganges-class ship of the line
- Tons burthen: 1,65664/94 (bm)
- Length: 170 ft 0 in (51.82 m) (gundeck)
- Beam: 47 ft 7 1/2 in (14.516 m)
- Depth of hold: 20 ft 3 in (6.17 m)
- Propulsion: Sails
- Sail plan: Full-rigged ship
- Armament: Gundeck: 28 × 32-pounder guns; Upper gundeck: 28 × 18-pounder guns; QD: 14 × 9-pounder guns; Fc: 4 × 9-pounder guns

General characteristics after 1810 rebuild
- Class & type: 74-gun third rate ship of the line
- Length: 170 ft 11 in (52.10 m) (gundeck)
- Propulsion: Sails
- Sail plan: Full-rigged ship
- Armament: Gundeck: 28 × 32-pounder guns; Upper gundeck: 28 × 18-pounder guns; QD: 4 × 12-pounder guns, 10 × 32-pounder carronades; FC: 2 × 12-pounder guns, 2 × 32-pounder carronades

General characteristics as Grampus
- Class & type: Fourth rate frigate
- Length: 171 ft 5 in (52.25 m) (gundeck)
- Propulsion: Sails
- Sail plan: Full-rigged ship
- Armament: 50 guns of various weights of shot

HMS Tremendous was a 74-gun third rate ship of the line of the Royal Navy, designed by Edward Hunt, built to the lines of HMS Ganges by William Barnard's yard at Deptford Green, and launched on 30 October 1784.

== French Revolutionary War service ==
Throughout May 1794 Tremendous, whilst under the command of Captain James Pigott, participated in the campaign which culminated in the Battle of the Glorious First of June. Pigott had kept his ship too far to windward of the enemy to make best use of his guns in the battle; Tremendous's captain was one of several denied medals afterwards. A child, christened Daniel Tremendous McKenzie, was born on board the ship during the battle.

While operating in the Indian Ocean, on 25 April 1799 Tremendous, Jupiter, and Adamant recaptured Chance as she lay at anchor under the guns of the battery at Connonies-Point, Île de France. The French frigate Forte had captured Chance, which was carrying a cargo of rice, in Balasore Roads. The squadron also recaptured another ship that a French privateer had captured in the Bay of Bengal. Lastly, after the French had driven the American ship Pacific onshore at River Noir, Adamant, Jupiter, and Tremendous came on the scene and sent in their boats, which removed much of Pacific's cargo of bale goods and sugar. The British then set Pacific on fire. On 11 December 1799, she destroyed the Preneuse at the Battle of Port Louis. On 11 March 1800 she was at Cape Town.

== Napoleonic Wars service ==
On 21 April 1806, she fought the inconclusive Action of 21 April 1806 against Canonnière.

Early in September 1811, Primus, carrying tar and hemp, Worksam, in ballast, Experiment, carrying iron, Columbus, carrying linseed, Neptunus, carrying timber, and Hector, carrying sundry goods, came into Yarmouth. They were prizes to Tremendous, Ranger, Calypso, Algerine, Musquito, Earnest. and Portia.

On 13 May 1815 she was present at the surrender of Naples during the Neapolitan War. A British squadron, consisting of Tremendous, the frigate Alcmene, the sloop Partridge, and the brig-sloop Grasshopper blockaded the port and destroyed all the gunboats there. Parliament voted a grant of £150,000 to the officers and men of the squadron for the property captured at the time, with the money being paid in May 1819. (Note: A first-class share for each of the captains of the first three vessels was worth £5805 3s 0d; a sixth-class share for an ordinary seaman on the same vessels was worth £60 13s 11d. The amounts were equivalent to 10–20 years' salary for a captain and more than two years for an ordinary seaman.)

== Rebuild ==
In 1807, Tremendous was placed in ordinary at Chatham, and sometime later was docked in Chatham Dockyard. The Admiralty had permitted Robert Seppings, then Master Shipwright at Chatham, to use Tremendous to demonstrate his innovative diagonal truss system of hull construction.

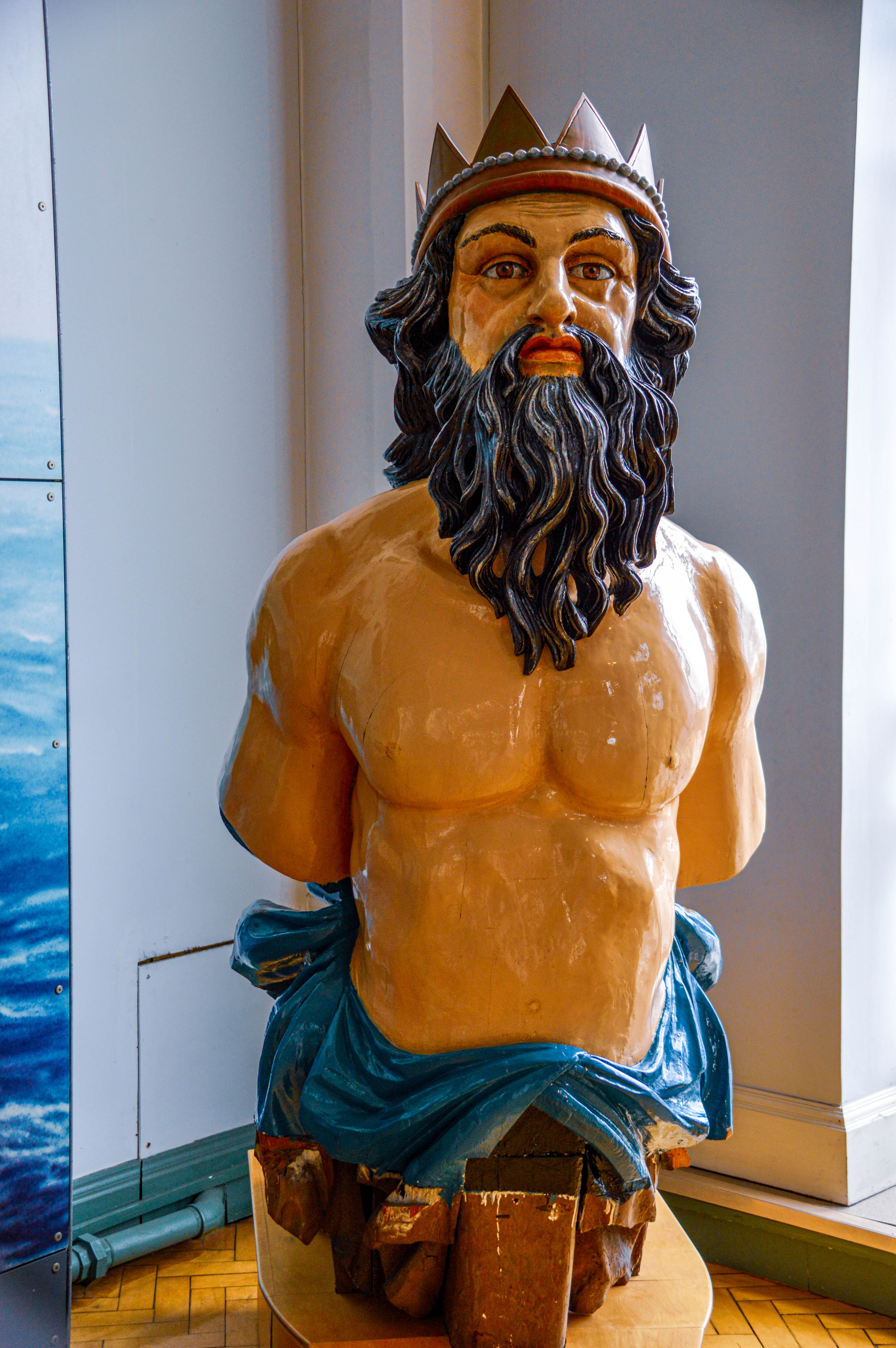
Figurehead from the 1810 rebuild

Tremendous was rebuilt in 1810 using this technique, and thus became the first ship to be built using the full diagonal truss system. The key differentiators from the old, traditional system of framing were a network of prominent diagonal timbers laid over the inside of the lower portion of the ship's hull, up to the underside of the main, or lower gundeck. These were bolted through the frames and provided a significant increase in hull stiffness, counter-acting the tendency of the ship's structure to 'work', or move slightly. Timbers were also placed diagonally between gunports on the inside of the hull, in place of simple spriketting of the old system, and the system even extended to the decks, where the planking was laid diagonally instead of longitudinally. The additional strength would also help reduce the amount of hogging experienced by the ship, a development that allowed for significant growth in dimensions of future wooden ships. Additionally, the gaps between the lowest elements of the ship's frames (floor timbers) were filled and caulked, so that the bottom of the ship essentially became a water-tight solid mass, to reduce rot and foul odours. Measurements taken after the newly rebuilt ship was undocked in 1810 showed virtually no deflection in the structure.

After reconstruction, the length on her gundeck had been increased to 170 ft 11 in (52.10 m), and her armament was slightly increased and supplemented with the addition of carronades on her quarterdeck and forecastle. She was also given a round bow, eliminating the old beakhead bulkhead at the forward end of the upper gundeck. This was one of the two key weak areas of a ship of the line (the other being the very lightly constructed stern), which exposed the crew to raking fire along the length of the ship. With this change, the bow frames (hawse pieces) were continued all the way up to the forecastle, as had been the case with frigates for several decades.

== Figurehead ==
HMS Grampus had several figureheads during her service. George Williams of Chatham carved a replacement for the ship under her former name of HMS Tremendous in 1810, followed by a replacement design for the same name by Hellyer & Sons on 14 March 1845. This was rejected following a name change to HMS Grampus, for which Hellyer & Sons submitted another design just three months later on 7 June 1845.

The figurehead of HMS Grampus can be seen at the National Museum of the Royal Navy, Portsmouth.

== Later career & Fate ==
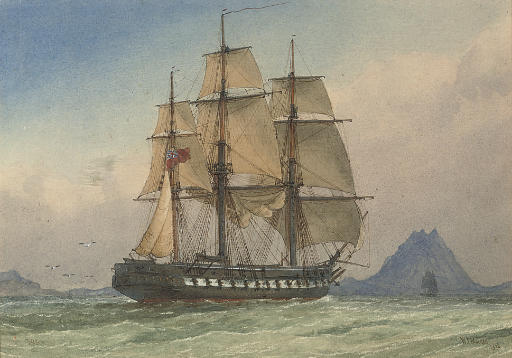
As Grampus, in the Pacific off Bora Bora, Tahiti

Tremendous was ordered to be broken up at Deptford in 1844, but during inspection prior to the work commencing she was found to be in excellent condition. She was instead transferred to Woolwich Dockyard, where in 1845 she was razéed to a 50-gun fourth rate frigate, and renamed HMS Grampus. During this work, seemingly poorly executed, 5 ft 6 in was added to the aft end of her gundeck, to enable her to carry the intended number of guns.

Commissioned under the command on Captain Henry Byam Martin at Woolwich on 17 November 1845, and finally departing from Plymouth Dockyard 16 February 1846, Grampus was ordered to proceed to the Sandwich Islands via Cape Horn, to receive further orders from Admiral Sir George Seymour. She was subsequently ordered to the waters around the Society Islands, to observe and report on the activities of the French during the Franco-Tahitian War.

Grampus returned to England in late 1847, and became a powder hulk in 1856. She was eventually sold out of the service for breaking-up in 1897.
