= HMS Briseis (1808) =

UK naval brig (1808–1816)

History

United Kingdom
- Name: HMS Briseis
- Builder: John King, Upnor
- Launched: 19 May 1808
- Commissioned: June 1808
- Honours and awards: Naval General Service Medal with clasp "Briseis 14 Octr. 1810"
- Fate: Wrecked 5 November 1816

General characteristics
- Class & type: Cherokee-class brig-sloop
- Tons burthen: 237/94 bm
- Length: Overall: 90 ft 3 in (27.5 m); Keel: 73 ft 9 3/4 in (22.5 m)
- Beam: 24 ft 7 1/2 in (7.5 m)
- Draught: 11 ft 0 in (3.4 m)
- Propulsion: Sails
- Sail plan: Brig
- Complement: 75 men and boys
- Armament: 8 × 18-pounder carronades; 2 × 6-pounder guns

HMS Briseis was a 10-gun Cherokee- class brig-sloop of the Royal Navy, launched in 1808 at Upnor, on the River Medway. She participated in one notable single ship action before she wrecked in 1816.

== Career ==
Commander John Pettet commissioned Briseis in June 1808.

On 17 December 1808, Briseis towed Isabella, of Newcastle, Lambert, master, into Harwich. Isabella had been sailing from Calmar to Hull when she became distressed. She had five feet of water in her hold, part of her cargo and guns had been thrown overboard, and her foreyard and her sails from the foreyard had been cut down. Her crew had been about to take to her boats and abandon her when Briseis came on the scene.

In May 1809, the boats of Briseis and Bruiser captured the Danish privateer El Courier of one 2-pounder gun and four swivel guns.

Elbe: On 7 July 1809, a small force consisting of HMS Musquito, the two Cherokee-class brig-sloops Briseis and Ephira, and five gun-brigs, including Basilisk, Centinel, Patriot, and Alert. On 7 July they entered the Elbe. There was a battery at Cuxhaven so they anchored out of range of its cannons.

Next morning at daylight a landing party found that the 80-man garrison of the battery had retreated, abandoning their guns. The British then loaded the battery's six 24-pounders into vessels lying in the harbour, together with all the shot and military stores they could find, and some other small guns. Next, they blew up the fort and seized two French gunboats, each of two guns. Lastly, the landing party handed the town of Cuxhaven back to the civil governor and then returned to the squadron.

On 26 July, French cavalry almost captured several British naval officers reconnoitering the village of Ritzbuttle. The British responded by sending a detachment to meet the French. The detachment discovered that the French had retreated to Gessendorf, which was some 26 miles (42 km) from Cuxhaven. He sent a landing party from Musquito towards Gessendorf. As soon the British approached, the French evacuated Gessendorf in requisitioned wagons, while about 60 cavalry covered their retreat. At the same time Pettet of Briseis took his men around the flank to capture a battery of four 12-pounders that was firing round shot and grape at the detachment. Before the British arrived, the French artillerymen abandoned their guns, making their escape via boats on the Weser. Still, the British captured the commander of the battery, together with three of his officers or non-commissioned officers. The British then burst the four 12-pounders before they took away the powder.

In September 1809, Commander John Adye took command of Briseis.

On 6 November, Briseis captured the Danish privateer Réciprocite off Heligoland. Réciprocite, of four guns and 14 men, had been out 12 days from Husum, without having made any captures.

Rensburg arrived at Yarmouth on 20 August 1810. Briseis had recaptured her from the Danes.

Sans Souci: On 14 October 1810, Lieutenant George Benthem (acting), was in command of Briseis and 80 miles west by south of Horn Reef when she sighted a French privateer. After a chase of eight hours, Briseis was able to close with the privateer and an engagement ensued. The engagement lasted an hour, with the vessels touching each other, before the privateer struck. The French had eight men killed and 19 wounded; the British had four men killed and 11 wounded. The privateer was the schooner Sans Souci, of ten 12-pounder guns and four 2-pounders. She had a crew of 55 men under the command of Captain Jules Jacob. She had left Amsterdam two days earlier in company with another schooner privateer, the two privateers intending to prey on British shipping on the Dogger Bank. (Note: Sans Souci was a privateer schooner commissioned in Amsterdam in December 1809. A French source gives the number of her casualties as eight killed and nine wounded.) Bentham brought San Souci into Yarmouth. (Note: Sans Souci's consort was the privateer schooner Jeune Louise, which HMS Quebec captured on 8 November.) When the Admiralty heard of the action they confirmed Benthem's appointment to Briseis, backdating the appointment to the date of the action. In 1847, the Admiralty awarded the two surviving claimants from the crew the Naval General Service Medal.

On 25 October 1810, Briseis and Snake were in company at the recapture of Ulrica Wilhelmina.

In December, Commander Charles T. Smith replaced Benthem. In May 1811, Briseis detained and sent into Yarmouth Dolly, Parsons, master. Dolly had been sailing from America to Petersburg.

In March 1812, Commander John Ross replaced Smith. James Clark Ross joined the Navy in April 1812, and served in this ship under the command of his uncle, John Ross.

On 28 December 1812, was off Pillau when Briseis approached the merchant vessel Uranie. As Ross got closer he realized that the French had captured Uranie, which was a transport under contract to the British government. Ross then pulled away. That night Briseis's pinnace with 18 officers and men rowed up to Uranie despite the French aboard her firing her guns (three a side), and swivels (two a side), at them. The British succeeded in boarding Uranie, driving the French to take to their boats. The British then cut her cables and brought her out, together with a "scout" that had been employed in unloading her. They also turned Uranie's guns on the retreating French. British casualties amounted to one man killed and three wounded.

On 9 October 1812, Briseis captured off "Rennoe" (possibly Rønne, the French privateer cutter Petit Poucet, of four guns, four swivel guns, and 23 men. Two days later Briseis drove three more privateers on shore at Hammershus Bay. They had sailed from Rostock and Strasland several days before but had not made any captures. (Note: A first-class share of the prize money was worth £62 6s 8d; a sixth-class share, that of an ordinary seaman, was worth £2 2s 0 3/4d.) (Note: Head money for the crews of the three privateers of unknown names was paid in March 1825.)

The King of Sweden awarded Commander Ross the insignia of a knight of the fourth class of the Royal Swedish Military Order of the Sword.

Briseis, Commander Ross, shared with three other vessels in the proceeds for the capture on 14 and 15 March 1813, of the Danish sloops Christian Ludwig Hoffnung, Carolina, Success, and Plinkoh Fordig. (Note: A first-class share of the prize money was worth £125 6s 1d; a sixth-class share was worth £2 7s 7d.)

Lieutenant William Rush Jackson replaced Ross. Jackson received promotion to Commander in October 1813. On 1 April 1814, the schooner Penryn, Evans, master, came into Ramsgate. Penryn had been sailing from Liverpool to Amsterdam when two French privateer luggers captured her. Briseis recaptured her.

In June 1815, Commander George Dommett assumed command.

== Loss ==
Commander George Dommett sailed Briseis on 24 October 1816, from Trinidad, Cuba, bound for Nassau. On 5 November, she sighted unknown land and Dommett sailed closer to attempt an identification of their location. He hove-to for the night off shore only to discover that a current was taking her inshore. Although the crew tried to save her, she grounded. Next morning she fell on her side and filled with water. The crew took to the boats and reached shore safely. There they discovered that they were at Point Pedras, about nine miles west of Bahia Honda on Cuba's northern coast.

The subsequent court martial faulted both Dommett's performance, and that of the Master. It sentenced Dommett to two years loss of seniority for "great want of attention". It placed the Master at the bottom of the list of Masters; he was not employed again as a Master for two years.

== In fiction ==
HMS Briseis appears as part of Commodore Jack Aubrey's squadron in Patrick O'Brian's The Hundred Days, where she is described as "the little Briseis, one of that numerous class called coffin-brigs" (however, the real Briseis did not serve in the Mediterranean, where the novel's action is set).
