= Ottoman corvette Ferahnüma =

History

Ottoman Empire
- Name: Ferahnüma
- Namesake: "Showing Happiness and Relief"
- Owner: Ottoman Navy
- Builder: Hammâmîzâde Ahmed Pasha, Silistra
- Launched: 1792
- Captured: March 1807
- Notes: By one report Ferahnüma was sent to the Ottoman Imperial Naval Arsenal due to its unsuitability for further employment. However, in 1810 a brig named Ferahnüma was listed among the Ottoman Navy's auxiliary fleet. Whether the brig was the earlier Ferahnüma acquired after the British Royal Navy's disposal of her in 1809, or a different vessel, is an open question.

United Kingdom
- Name: Fara Numa
- Acquired: 21 March 1807 by capture
- Fate: Disposed of in 1809

General characteristics
- Tons burthen: Unknown
- Length: 37 Turkish Zirai(91 ft 11 in (28.0 m))
- Propulsion: Sail
- Sail plan: Ship
- Complement: 150 (Ottoman service)
- Armament: 14 × 6-pounder + 2 × 18-pounder guns (Ottoman service)

Ferahnüma was an Ottoman corvette launched in 1792. The British Royal Navy captured her on 21 March at the Alexandria expedition of 1807. The Royal Navy commissioned her under Commander Samuel Fowell in early 1808, and disposed of her in 1809, probably early in the year. Commander Fowell assumed command of HMS Roman circa April 1809.
