= HMS Snake (1797) =

Brig-sloop of the Royal Navy (1797–1816)

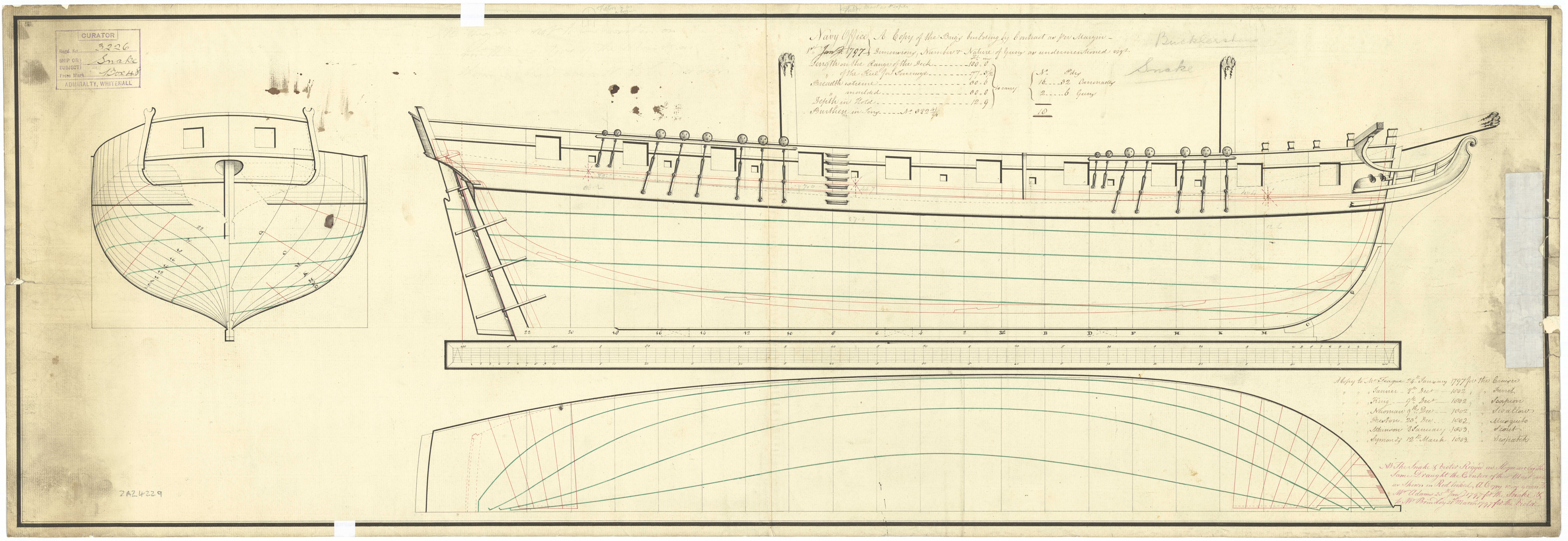
- Snake

History

Great Britain
- Name: HMS Snake
- Ordered: 19 December 1796
- Builder: Balthazar & Edward Adams, Bucklers Hard
- Laid down: January 1797
- Launched: 18 December 1797
- Fate: Sold 1816

General characteristics
- Type: Brig sloop
- Tons burthen: 38575/94 (bm)
- Length: 100 ft 1 1/2 in (30.5 m) (overall); 77 ft 4 in (23.6 m) (keel)
- Beam: 30 ft 7 1/2 in (9.3 m)
- Depth of hold: 12 ft 9 in (3.9 m)
- Complement: 121
- Armament: 16 × 32-pounder carronades + 2 × 6-pounder chase guns

HMS Snake was an 18-gun brig-sloop of the Royal Navy launched in 1797 as the only member of her class. She captured or destroyed two French privateers and one Danish privateer. Snake also captured numerous small merchantmen, but spent time escorting convoys to and from the West Indies. She was sold in 1816.

== Design ==
Snake was the sole vessel of her class. Her designer was Sir William Rule. He produced two designs, one for a ship-sloop (Snake), and one for a brig-sloop (Cruizer) that differed only in their rigging. His designs were in competition with those of John Henslow, who produced the ship-sloop Echo and the brig-sloop Busy. Rule's brig-sloop design won. The Admiralty ultimately ordered 106 Cruizer-class brig-sloops. In 1811, the Navy converted Snake to a brig-sloop, making her indistinguishable from the Cruizer-class brig-sloops.

== Career ==
Snake was commissioned in February 1798 under Commander John Mason Lewis for cruising and convoy duty.

On the morning of 10 November 1799 Eurydice was some three leagues (14 km) south-east of Beachy Head, when she sighted a schooner and a brig. The schooner made off as soon as she saw the ship and the brig hove to and hoisted her ensign upside down. The brig Diana, which had been carrying a cargo of coal from Sunderland, informed Eurydice that Diana had repelled an attack by a French privateer, suffering one man badly wounded while doing so. Eurydice sent over a boat and her surgeon, Mr. Pardie, had to amputate the arm of the wounded man on Diana. Eurydice then set off in chase. At around 11a.m. Snake came up and joined the chase. Halfway through the afternoon Eurydice came nearly within gunshot of the privateer which bore up and tried to cross Snake. Snake thwarted the attempt and the privateer then lowered her sails, enabling Snake to send over a boarding party. The schooner was Hirondelle, of fourteen 3 and 4-pounder guns, with a crew of 50 men under the command of Pierre Merie Dugerdin. Hirondelle had left Calais the previous day and had not made any captures. She was under the command of Jean Fresson.

On 3 February 1800 Snake sailed from Spithead with Melpomene and Magnanime. They were escorts to the convoy of some 150 ships to African and the East Indies. Snake parted from the convoy on 25 March in a terrible storm. She was not heard from for so long that it was believed that she had been lost. However, on 14 October she returned to Portsmouth from the coast of Africa. She brought at prize with her.

This was almost certainly the brig Less Amis that Snake captured on 13 September 1800.

Snake went into dock in November. Captain Lewis received a promotion to post captain on 1 January 1801. Commander Charles Tinling assumed command in January 1801. Snake was one of the vessels that sailed from Spithead on 17 January 1801 for undeclared stations to transmit orders that the Royal Navy at that station was to detain all Swedish and Danish vessels. She returned on 26 January.

Commander William Roberts replaced Tinling, who had been promoted to post captain. On 23 February Roberts sailed Snake as escort to a convoy for West Africa. However, contrary winds forced her to return to St Helen's. She was assigned to the Africa station.

In late 1801 Roberts sailed Snake to Jamaica.

The French frigate Guerriere was initially trapped in harbour by the blockade of Saint-Domingue. She was with the 74-gun Duguay-Trouin on 24 July 1803, when a British ship sighted Duguay-Trouin off Cape Picolet. The 74-gun HMS Elephant gave chase, and the two ships exchanged several broadsides. Snake appeared on the north-west quarter, but Elephant, either because of the appearance of Guerrière to windward, or for another unexplained reason, failed to maintain her position alongside Duguay-Trouin. Consequently, both French ships were able to escape. However, Duquesne, a 74-gun armed en flûte, was captured.

On 10 November Snake chased a French privateer all day. In trying to evade him after dark the privateer grounded on Rocky Point near the east end of Jamaica. The quarry was Esperance. Snake captured her 60 crew members and took them into Port Royal. (Note: Head money was paid in 1825. A first-class share of the prize money was worth £87 12s 1 1/2d; a fifth-class share, that of a seaman, was worth 13s 8 3/4d.)

The London Morning Post reported on 12 November 1803 that Snake had detained 12 vessels, most of which were American. They were bound from Jérémie to Cape François and Snake sent them into Port Royal.

In the spring of 1804 Commander Roberts commanded a small force based at New Providence in the Bahamas.

Lloyd's List reported on 20 August 1805 that a French privateer had captured the American brig Angel, Spih, master, as Angel was sailing from St Domingo to Philadelphia. Snake recaptured Angel, which came into Port Royal, Jamaica.

Between March and August 1807 Snake underwent a Middling Repair at Chatham. In July Commander Thomas Young recommissioned her for the Leith Station. In August Snake was at the Nore and so was among the vessels that benefited from the proceeds of the Danish vessels detained there. The vessels Printz Frederick, Freden, Elizabeth, Vrow Anna, Margdretha, Anna Elizabeth, and Cecilia were detained between the 26 and 29 August, and Cupido was detained on 1 September.

On 15 October Snake was in company with Piercer and Leyden at the capture of the Danish brig Narhvalen and so later shared in the proceeds.

Between April and May 1809 Snake was at Sheerness being converted from a sloop to a brig.

On 24 June 1809 Snake and Fancy were in company and so later shared in the proceeds from the capture of the Danish galliot Catherina.

On 21 July the brig Johanna Catherina, a prize to Snake, arrived at Leith.

On 22 July 1809, Snake and Fancy approached the town of Hammerfest in Norway. Before reaching Hammerfest, the two vessels had successfully attacked the village of Hasvik. The following battle between Hammerfest's two two-cannon batteries and the Royal Navy warships with a combined number of thirty-two cannon between them was unusually intense and did not end until the Norwegian cannons had run out of gunpowder after about 90 minutes of combat. Both warships had suffered a number of cannonball hits and had at least one fatal casualty; a sailor who was buried at the local cemetery. During the battle, the local populace evacuated the town, and Snake and Fancy remained in the town for eight days after the Norwegian defenders withdrew. The crews sacked the empty town before withdrawing.

Lloyd's List reported on 1 August that Fortuna had arrived at Aberdeen. Snake had captured her off North Cape.

On 8 August, Snake captured a Danish galliot, name unknown. The sales proceeds were remitted from Gothenburg.

Also on 8 August three Danish vessels arrived at Leith. They were prizes to Nightingale, Snake, and Naiad. One may have been the Danish privateer schooner Roland, which Snake had captured the day before.

On 30 August Frederick of Oldenburgh, from Archangel, came into Leith. The Danes had captured her, and Snake had recaptured her. A later prize money announcement makes clearer that Snake had recaptured the galliot Oldenburg, Carl Frederick Janvaril-Veer, master.

Lloyd's List reported on 15 September that Snake had captured a Danish privateer of 12 guns and 78 men and brought her into Leith. This may have been Christiana that Snake captured off Bergen. On 12 October Snake captured the Danish galliot Frue Mette.

On 15 May 1810 Snake captured Tri Bergithie.

On 25 October Snake and Briseis were in company at the recapture of Ulrica Wilhelmina.

In November Commander William Hellard replaced Commander Young. Snake continued to serve on the Leith Station.

On 18 April 1811 a Danish schooner with a cargo of grain arrived at Leith. She was a prize to Snake. On 8 May Snake captured a Danish sloop of unknown name.

Snake was at Lerwick on 5 November. She had saved men from a prize belonging to HMS Tartar. On the Sunday prior to 6 November, a Russian galiot that Tartar had captured was laying stranded at Montrose. The river had carried her and deposited her on the beach. A strong tide then lifted her, causing her to drift out to sea where she was dashed to pieces on the Ness (probably Scurdie Ness).

Hellard received promotion to post captain on 12 August 1812, and Commander George Robbin took command of Snake for the Jamaica station. Snake was among the vessels benefiting from the seizure on 12 August of the American vessels Cuba, Caliban, Edward, Galen, Halcyon, and Cygnet, shortly after the commencement of the War of 1812.

On 1 December Snake captured Twende Sostre, Winther, master, on 21 January 1813 Splied, Pederson, master. Commander Robbin died while on the Jamaica station.

From 16 February 1814 to October 1815 Commander Joseph Gape was in command of Snake., She made one more capture, that of the smuggling lugger Fox on 11 May 1815. (Note: A first-class share was worth £3 13s; a sixth-class share, that of an ordinary seaman, was worth 6 1/4d.)

== Fate ==
The "Principal Officers and Commissioners of His Majesty's Navy" offered for sale on 18 April 1816, lying at Sheerness, the "Snake brig, of 386 tons". She sold there on that day for £820.
