= HMS Basilisk (1801) =

Brig of the Royal Navy

History

United Kingdom
- Name: HMS Basilisk
- Ordered: 7 January 1801
- Builder: John Randall & Co., Rotherhithe
- Laid down: January 1801
- Launched: 2 April 1801 (already coppered)
- Completed: 3 April to 19 April 1801 at Deptford
- Stricken: sold 14 December 1815

General characteristics
- Class & type: 12-gun Bloodhound-class gun-brig
- Tons burthen: 185 83/94 (bm)
- Length: 80 ft 1 in (24.4 m) (overall); 65 ft 7 in (20.0 m) (keel)
- Beam: 23 ft 1 in (7.0 m)
- Depth of hold: 8 ft 6 in (2.6 m)
- Sail plan: Brig
- Complement: 50, including a detachment of 14 Royal Marines
- Armament: 10 × 18-pounder carronades; 2 × 18-pounder or 32-pounder carronades as bow chasers

HMS Basilisk was a Bloodhound-class gun-brig built by Randall in Rotherhithe and launched in 1801. She served briefly at the end of the French Revolutionary Wars, with most of her service occurring during the Napoleonic Wars protecting convoys from privateers, conducting close-inshore surveillance and taking enemy coastal shipping. She was sold for breaking in 1815.

== French Revolutionary Wars ==
In 1801 Basilisk was commissioned under Lieutenant Samuel Gooch (or Gooche), in the Channel. She served under Captain Cunningham in the frigate Clyde, who was senior officer between Le Havre and the Île de Batz.

On 16 August Basilisk and Bloodhound were at anchor, on station, between Barfleur and Marcou when they sighted two brigs and 17 gunvessels coming round Cape Barfleur. Gooch signaled to Captain Ross Donnelly of Maidstone, who was closer and who proceeded in pursuit. The enemy ran into a bay west of the cape. There they anchored close to the beach where a battery and some field guns could fire in support of them. Basilisk and Bloodhound followed them and anchored in two fathoms. The two British vessels were within 18-pounder range and started firing. Maidstone, however, could not approach within range of her 12-pounder guns and so signaled Basilisk and Bloodhound to withdraw. Later, when the tide came in, the enemy rowed round the lighthouse and disappeared, while the wind and tide conditions prevented the three British vessels from following. When the British could find the enemy neither in Isigny nor within La Hogue, Cunningham surmised that they might have returned to Cherbourg and sailed there, where he found a number of French vessels and a convoy.

On 4 September Basilisk was in company with Maidstone when they captured the Jonge Jan Schoon.

== Napoleonic Wars ==
=== 1803–1805 ===
In February 1803 Basilisk came under the command of Lieutenant William Shepheard, previously commander of Pigmy.On 24 June Basilisk, the sloop Ranger and the hired armed cutter Sheerness captured five French fishing vessels, which Basilisk sent into Dover. By July Basilisk had assumed her station off Dunkirk in company with Lynx and Milbrook.

On 8 December, Basilisk and Mariner captured the Jussrouw Catherina. Jussrow Catherina was apparently a smuggling cutter.

On 18 December 1803, after a chase from daybreak to noon, Basilisk captured the French Gunboat No. 436. She was armed with a brass 18-pounder gun in front and a howitzer aft. Her crew was under the command of ensign de vaisseau Lewis Sautoin, and comprised seven sailors, and a captain and 27 soldiers of the 36th Regiment of the Line. She had left Dunkirk the day before and was sailing to Boulogne.

On 22 October 1804 Basilisk was in company with Champion when they recaptured the Frances. (Note: The salvage money for a seaman amounted to 11d.)

The next day, Basilisk was in company with Immortalite and Orestes when they found three praams, seven brigs and 15 luggers off Cap Gris Nez. The French convoy was sailing westward and keeping close inshore under cover of the batteries and an escort of horse artillery that followed them as they made their way to the Banc de Laine. Immortalite closed with the praams under the high land of Cap Blanc Nez, with Orestes and Basilisk joining in the attack. The running fight lasted for more than an hour before the falling tide forced the British to seek deeper water. The French convoy escaped, though possibly with some losses of men. Immortalite herself suffered one man killed, three men mortally wounded and eight others wounded.

When Shepheard was appointed to command the hired cutter Earl St Vincent, Lieutenant William Patey replaced him as captain of Basilisk.

In April 1805 a large British squadron was off Boulogne and between 24 and 25 April they captured a number of Dutch schuyts, some armed and some not. On 24 April, Basilisk shared with Orestes, Fairy, and Speedy, gun-brig Tigress, and bomb vessels Devastation and Lucifer in the capture of the unarmed Dutch schuyt No. 54. On 28 April, Basilisk, Jamaica, Speedy, Orestes, Devastation, Lucifer, Tigress, and Blazer captured the Sally, Williams, Master. Some party appealed the prize award and it took some years before the appeal was dropped. Next, Basilisk, Orestes, Volcano, Devastation, Ariadne, Fury, Combatant, and Calypso captured the American ship Enoch on 14 June 1805. Then on 3 August, Basilisk was in company with Blazer, Bold, Tigress, Piercer, Ariadne and Furious when they captured the Frederick Wilhelm.

On 14 October 1805, Basilisk, then under Lieutenant George Higgs, was in company with Furious and Ariadne when Furious captured the Cornelia and her cargo of fish. Prize money was due 13 January 1810.

=== 1806–1809 ===
Around 1806 Basilisk was ordered north to be based at Leith in Scotland. Basilisk was in company with the gun-brig Urgent and Diligence when they captured the Mercurius, Thompson, Master, on 8 April. Urgent sent Mercurius, which was sailing from Alicante to Embden, into Dover. Basilisk also sent the Maria and Elizabeth, which had been sailing from Havana to Tonningen, into Dover.

Basilisk was at the second Battle of Copenhagen on 7 September 1807. She therefore shared in the prize money for the capture of the Danish fleet. (Note: An able seaman received £3 8s.) Prior to the battle, Basilisk participated in the capture of the Hans and Jacob on 17 August. (Note: This garnered an able seaman 2s 6d in prize money.)

On 30 September 1808, while under the temporary command of Sub-Lieutenant Charles Balfour, Basilisk was escorting a convoy to Shetland when she captured the privateer Don Flinnke. Don Flinkke was armed with four 12-pounder carronades and two swivel guns, and had a crew of 24 men. The capture took place off Buchanness, and Basilisk took her prize into Leith. Don Flinnke may have been the former Eliza, of Lerwick. Basilisk also recaptured a schooner, prize to the Danish privateer.

For the most part, Basilisk guarded convoys to Shetland and elsewhere. Then on 22 October, Basilisk and Spitfire sailed to the assistance of the sloop Cygnet, which the Dowlaw signal station, near Dunbar, reported had cut away her masts and bowsprit and thrown some of her guns overboard. Basilisk and Spitfire brought Cygnet back to Leith Roads.

Lieutenant Samuel Crew commanded Basilisk in 1809 and 1810. On 13 April 1809, Basilisk and Pincher took a Danish privateer of unknown name and the Danish galiot Jonge Anna Catherina. Also in late April or early May, boats from Pincher and Basilisk captured a galliot laden with deals near the Watt Sand.

On 20 May the gun-brigs Basilisk and Bruizer, and the sloop Briseis captured three vessels: the Courier, Junge Catharina and a Blankenese boat of unknown name.

In June 1809 Lord George Stuart placed Commander William Goate of Musquito in command of a small force consisting of Musquito, the two Cherokee-class brig-sloops Briseis, Robert Pettet, and Ephira, Edward Watts, five gun-brigs, including Basilisk and Centinel, one armed schuyt, and a cutter. On 7 July they entered the Elbe and anchored out of gunshot of the battery at Cuxhaven.

At daylight the following morning Goate, with the commanding officers, seamen and marines of their respective vessels, landed to attack the battery. However, the 80-man garrison retreated. The British seized the battery and hoisted the British flag; they also hoisted the Hamburg flag on the castle at Kitzbuttle. They then loaded the battery’s six 24-pounders into vessels lying in the harbor, together with some small cannons and all the shot and military stores. Next they undermined and blew up the battery. They also seized two French gunboats, each of two guns. Lastly, the landing party handed the town of Cuxhaven back to the civil governor before they embarked. In November 1813 proceeds of the captured stores, etc. from Cuxhaven were payable to Aimable, Basilisk and the other vessels of the squadron.

=== 1810–1813 ===
On 16 March 1810, Lieutenant Crew sailed Basilisk for the Mediterranean, where she was involved in several actions in southwest Spain and elsewhere. Lieutenant George Wood replaced Lieutenant Crew.

In 1811 Lieutenant Vallack was in command of Basilisk, with the British squadron at Cadiz. Between 27 and 29 March there was a tremendous gale at Cadiz that damaged a number of British vessels and blew Basilisk out to sea.

On 15 April a Spanish force left Cadiz to join General Beresford at the approaching siege of Badajos. The British squadron's small vessels received the assignment to maintain communications. Lieutenant Vallack and his boat's crew drowned when they tried to cross the bar of the Guadiana River on this assignment. On 11 July 1811 Lieutenant George French took command. He then sailed Basilisk to Portugal on 4 March 1812.

In May 1812, Hyacinth and Termagant, Captains Thomas Ussher and Gawen William Rowan-Hamilton, and Basilisk supported Spanish guerrillas on the coast of Grenada. Termangant destroyed the castle at Nerja on 20 May. The British squadron then supported a guerrilla offensive against Almuñécar. On 24 May with Hyacinth and Termagant, Basilisk took a French privateer of two guns and 30 or 40 men under the castle. The British squadron bombarded the castle, breaching the walls. The French then retreated to Grenada. Basilisk's only casualty was one man slightly wounded. Prize money for the "capture of a brass gun and the destruction of a French privateer, name unknown" was payable in March 1836. (Note: A first-class share was worth £23 18s 6d; a sixth-class share, that of an ordinary seaman, was worth 5s 7½d.)

In December Basilisk detained and sent into Gibraltar the Concordia, Coffin, master, which had been sailing from Virginia to Cadiz. On 18 December Basilisk captured Gunboat #437, of two guns, off Boulogne.

In mid-March Basilisk detained and sent into Gibraltar the Polly, Jones, master, which had been sailing from Cadiz to New Orleans. Basilisk was re-rated as a sloop in May 1813 and the newly promoted Commander George French recommissioned her.

== Post-war and fate ==
In the spring of 1814 Basilisk was fitted as a tender and came under the command of Lieutenant Philip Anstruther, who sailed her between Dublin and Plymouth. When Anstruther died in August, Lieutenant Abraham Pike took command.

The Admiralty offered Basilisk for sale on 14 December 1815 at Plymouth. She was sold there for breaking for £730 on that date.

== Crew ==
While the captains of Basilisk changed regularly, some of the crew provided continuity. Royal Marine Abel Helps signed on to Basilisk 29 May 1802 as a corporal (ADM 96/216), was raised to sergeant 9 March 1805 (ADM 158/91), and disembarked at Portsmouth 16 Oct 1809 (ADM 35/2625), meaning he was on board for 7 years 5 months. By 4 November 1809 he had joined another ship, the frigate Nyaden.
