= HMS Carrier =

Cutter of the Royal Navy

History

United Kingdom
- Name: Frisk
- Builder: Bools & Good, Bridport
- Launched: 1803
- Fate: Sold 1805

United Kingdom
- Name: HMS Carrier
- Acquired: 1805
- Commissioned: May 1805
- Honours and awards: Naval General Service Medal with clasp "Carrier 14 Novr. 1807"
- Captured: 24 January 1808?

France
- Name: Anacreon
- Captured: 11 December 1811

General characteristics
- Type: Cutter
- Tons burthen: 54 (bm)
- Length: 47 ft 8 in (14.5 m)
- Beam: 17 ft 2 in (5.2 m)
- Armament: 4 × 12-pounder carronades + 6 × 3-pounder guns.

HMS Carrier was a cutter of 10 guns, the ex-mercantile Frisk, which the Royal Navy purchased in 1805. She captured two privateers, with one action earning her crew a Naval General Service Medal. She grounded in 1808, which enabled the French to capture her. She became a French privateer that the Royal Navy recaptured in 1811, but apparently did not take back into service.

== Origins ==
Bools & Good, of Bridport, built Frisk in 1803. The Admiralty purchased her in 1805 and registered her on 28 May.

== Service ==
Lieutenant John Gedge commissioned her in May 1805 for the North Sea. Carrier shared with Active, Earnest, Gripper, Mariner, and Minx in the proceeds from the recapture of Francis, Tucker, master, and Betsey on 14 and 15 September.

Lieutenant Robert Ramsey replaced Gedge in 1806.

On 18 January 1807, Carrier was in company with Dictator, Flora, and Forester when they captured the American brig Eliza. Nine days later, Carrier recaptured and sent into Yarmouth Courier, which had been sailing from Memel to Hull when the French privateer Revenge had captured her on the 27th.

On 19 February Carrier chased the French privateer cutter Chasseur into the hands of Ariadne. At the time, Carrier was also in company with the hired armed cutters Princess Augusta and Princess of Wales, the latter under the command of Lieutenant Edward Southcott.

As Carrier was returning to her station, together with Princess Augusta, at 9:00 am she sighted a suspicious sail ten leagues from Goree. After a chase of five hours she caught up with the French privateer schooner Ragotin. Ragotin, under the command of Jaques Jappie, carried eight guns, which she had thrown overboard during the chase, and a crew of 29 men. She was eight days out of Dunkirk, on her first cruise, and had not made any captures.

Carrier was one of several vessels that shared in the prize money for the Yonge Klaas, captured on 31 July 1806. (Note: This capture earned an ordinary seaman 1s.)

Carrier was in company with Crescent when they captured the St. Peter on 26 July . (Note: A seaman's share of the prize money was 17s 4¾d.) Two days later Carrier was still in company with Crescent when they captured Swedish brig Christiana Elizabeth, Louis Raberg, Master.

The gun-brig Constant and Carrier captured the Danish vessel Minerva on 20 August 1807. Four days later Carrier captured the Danish vessel Wenskabet, O. Paus, master. Both of these captures however, occurred prior to hostilities.

Then on 11 September Carrier brought to the Admiralty the despatches from Admiral Thomas McNamara Russell announcing the capitulation of the island of Heligoland to the British. William Milne took command at some point after Heligoland. He had been a sub-lieutenant on Carrier at Heligoland and at the seizure of Copenhagen in September 1807.

On 14 November, off Cromer, Carrier was under the command of Acting Lieutenant William Milne when she captured a French cutter-rigged privateer. Milne had steered towards what he thought was a fishing boat from which he wished to ask about how far they were from land, but when he got close she hoisted French colours and opened fire. Because of a gale, heavy seas, and the fact that she had a crew of only 16 men aboard, Carrier could not make use of her four 12-pounder carronades. Once Carrier had shot away the French vessel's colours and halyards she surrendered. She proved to be the Actif, commissioned for eight guns, but with only two on board at the time Carrier captured her. She had a crew 32 men under the command of Norbat Corcenwinder and had suffered four wounded. Actif had left Dunkirk three weeks earlier and had captured two vessels, a galiot that Sybille recaptured, and the Lord Keith, an English sloop. Milne put a prize crew aboard Actif and sent her to Yarmouth. (Note: The prize money for the capture of Actif for an ordinary seaman was £4 9d.) In 1847 the Admiralty awarded the Naval General Service Medal with clasp "Carrier 14 Novr. 1807" to all surviving claimants from this action.

== Capture ==
At this point her history becomes confusing. Accounts differ on when and where the French captured Carrier. The best account, based on court martial records, reports that on 24 January 1808 Carrier grounded off Étaples, on the coast of France. This occurred during the night and in the morning shore batteries opened fire. Unable to get her off, Carrier's crew abandoned her after trying, unsuccessfully, to set her on fire.

The New Navy List reports that Milne was involved in an attack on Boulogne, and that later in 1808 he was involved in an attack on two batteries at Étaples, where he was wounded twice, and that Carrier subsequently was wrecked. This may represent a garbled version of the above account. A third account has Carrier grounding on 5 February 1809 on a sandbank off Boulogne.

By all accounts, the French captured her and her crew, who would be prisoners for five years. Their court martial took place some six years after the grounding and the board blamed the master's mate and the pilot. However, by that time the master's mate had died while a prisoner in France and the pilot "showed signs of madness".

After her capture, Carrier became a French privateer under the name of Anacreon.

== Recapture ==
Lieutenant Edward Southcott, commander of the hired armed cutter Princess of Wales captured Anacreon on 11 December 1811, off the Dogger Bank. She had a crew of 37 men and had thrown her four guns overboard while trying to outrun Princess of Wales. Anacreon was 24 days out of Groningen but had not taken any prizes.

There are no indications that the Admiralty took Anacreon/Carrier back into service.
