= Thomas Hurd =

Captain of the Royal Navy, hydrographer and explorer (1747–1823)

Captain Thomas Hurd
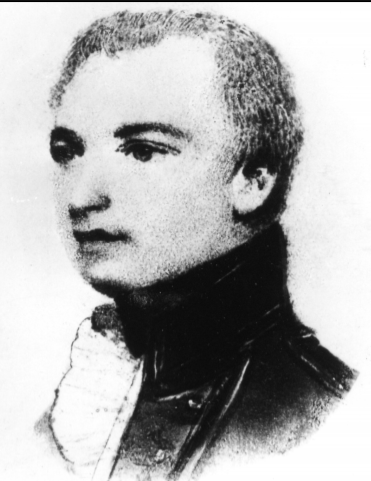

Hydrographer of the Navy
- In office 28 May 1808 – 29 April 1823
- Preceded by: Alexander Dalrymple
- Succeeded by: Sir William Parry

Personal details
- Born: Thomas Hannaford Hurd before 30 January 1747 Plymouth, Devon, England
- Died: 23 April 1823 (aged 76) London, Middlesex, England
- Occupation: Antarctic explorer, hydrographer

Military service
- Branch: Royal Navy
- Service years: 1768–1823
- Rank: Captain
- Wars: American Revolutionary War; French Revolutionary Wars; Napoleonic Wars

Thomas Hannaford Hurd (bapt. 30 January 1747 – 29 April 1823) was an officer of the Royal Navy, who rose to the rank of captain. As a surveyor, he is noted for his work in Bermuda and the English Channel. He became the second Hydrographer of the Navy, a Superintendent of Chronometers and a Commissioner on the Board of Longitude. Hurd's Deep in the English Channel and the Antarctic Hurd Peninsula are named after him. His establishment of a corps of specialised surveying officers commanding their own ships led to him being described as "the father of the Hydrographic Service".

== Life ==
Thomas Hurd was born in Plymouth, and joined the navy in September 1768 at the age of 19. He served as an able seaman aboard HMS Cornwall, which was then under the command of Captain Molyneux Shuldham. He served on the Newfoundland and North American stations between 1771 and 1774, part of the time aboard the armed vessel HMS Canceaux, under Lieutenant Henry Mowat. From 1772 to 1775, while with Canceaux, Hurd helped Samuel Holland conduct hydrographic surveys of the mouths of the St. Croix and St John's rivers in the Bay of Fundy. He identified offshore shoals that could be a hazard to shipping, and fixed their positions. He also carried out soundings in Passamaquoddy Bay that were used by Thomas Wright in his map of the area.

Hurd passed his lieutenant's examination on 1 March 1775, and went on to serve aboard Lord Howe's flagship, HMS Eagle. Howe appointed Hurd as lieutenant of HMS Unicorn on 30 January 1777. Unicorn was a frigate under the command of Captain John Ford, which had a coppered hull. Being free of barnacles she was able to capture a great deal of enemy shipping and Hurd as Lieutenant gathered a large amount of prize money. After Unicorn's return to England she was one of the small squadron engaged under Captain Sir James Wallace in setting fire to three enemy ships and taking the French ship Danae, a brig and a sloop as prizes in a minor battle on 13 May 1779 off the French coast at Cancale.

In the Battle of the Saintes off Dominica, on 12 April 1782, Hurd was second lieutenant of the Hercules from which he was moved into HMS Ardent. Ardent had been recaptured from the French and was one of the prizes. Hurd helped sail her back to England under her commander, Richard Lucas. The battle was a victory for Admiral Sir George Rodney and Great Britain. Following this Hurd suffered on the ill-fated return journey from Jamaica—with Rear-Admiral Thomas Graves—where there were large losses due to a hurricane. Howe recommended Hurd for the post of surveyor-general of Cape Breton, to which he was appointed in 1785, but was dismissed the following year by lieutenant-governor Joseph Frederick Wallet DesBarres.

=== Bermuda ===
1941 nautical chart showing The Narrows (Hurd's Channel), Murray's anchorage, and Ireland Island

Hurd was sent to carry out the first exact survey of Bermuda in 1789, a task that took him nearly nine years. The inhabitants of Bermuda in their small sloops were familiar with navigation through the reefs surrounding the islands, but the Navy was interested in whether the islands could provide a harbour for deep draught warships. This question became more urgent in 1793, when France declared war on Britain, and protecting British shipping, particularly from French privateers operating from United States waters, became a priority. Britain had naval bases in Halifax, Nova Scotia and in Jamaica and Antigua, but nothing in between. Although the USA was neutral, and would remain so until 1812, relations were often difficult, making provisioning in US ports problematic. In 1794, Rear Admiral George Murray was appointed to command the North American squadron. He was sent a chart from Hurd's survey, and quickly saw the potential benefits of a base in Bermuda. He sent Captain Charles Penrose in HMS Cleopatra to Bermuda in February 1795. Hurd took Cleopatra through the passage he had surveyed through the reef into a new anchorage, which Penrose named "Murray's anchorage". Penrose provided a detailed report for Murray, who then visited with a flotilla headed by his flagship HMS Resolution, arriving on 16 May. They anchored outside the reef while Murray went through the channel in a pilot boat to where Cleopatra was anchored. Satisfied that the passage through the reef could be safely navigated, Murray ordered Resolution and two other ships into the inner anchorage, the 74-gun Resolution being the largest ship ever brought through the reef. The pilot who brought the ships through the passage was James Darrell, one of three enslaved black men, experienced pilots, who Hurd had trained to assist in his surveying work. Murray was impressed by Darrell's ability and steadiness and recommended that his freedom be purchased as a reward, which was done. Darrell and the other two pilots, Jacob Pitcar and Tom Bean were then employed as King's Pilots, on the books of Resolution, with Hurd as their supervisor. Darrell would later become the first Black Bermudan to buy a house,

On 18 May, Murray and his captains visited the town of St. George, where they were welcomed with a great reception. In the following week, Hurd and Murray explored the new anchorages, including other possible entrances, and also westwards to Grassy Bay and Ireland Island, which Murray regarded as an ideal location for a dockyard. Murray sent a report to the Admiralty, with detailed recommendations for establishing a naval base on Bermuda. Not all of his suggestions were agreed to at the time, but Bermuda became an established harbour for the squadron, particularly in winter. When the USA declared war on Britain in 1812, the importance of Bermuda greatly increased, and it was the base from which the 1814 attack on Washington was launched. It eventuallly became one of the largest British overseas bases.

Murray praised Hurd in his report to the admiralty, which helped to ensure Hurd's promotion to Commander on 18 August 1795. He served as captain of HMS Bermuda and briefly HMS Spencer, before returning to HMS Bermuda. With the survey work complete, Hurd returned to England with his family in December 1897. He worked on drawing the fair sheets of the survey, but it took three more years before the work was finally complete. Admiral St Vincent, First Lord of the Admiralty commented that Hurd's accurate survey had convinced him that the arsenal should be transferred from Halifax to Bermuda. For some purposes, Hurd's survey was too accurate, and published maps based on it omitted some details in order to avoid assisting a potential invader. Even modern maps show considerably less detail of the reefs surrounding the islands than Hurd's original drawings. Hurd received promotion to post captain on 29 April 1802.

=== Bay of Brest and English Channel ===
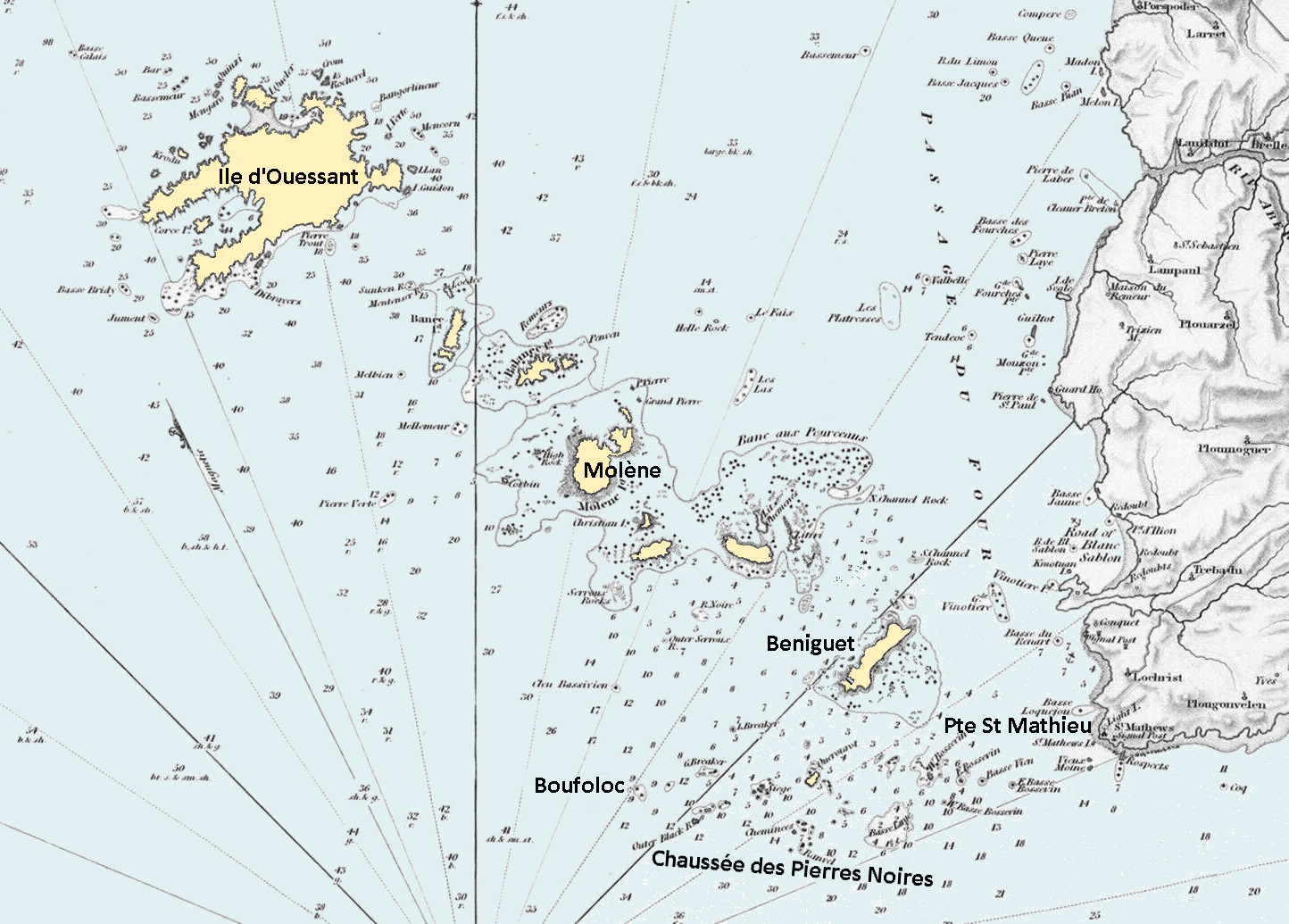
Hurd's 1804 survey area from Ile d'Ouessant to Pointe Saint-Mathieu. Detail from Hurd's chart, with islands and salient points highlighted. Brest is about 20km east of Pointe Saint-Mathieu

In May 1803, war with France restarted, and William Cornwallis, commanding the channel fleet, resumed the blockade of Brest. In March 1804, the 74-gun ship HMS Magnificent struck a submerged rock and was lost, though the crew was rescued. This loss was blamed on inadequate charts and led to a new survey being planned. Hurd started work on this in June 1804. The work was carried out in open oared boats, taking soundings around submerged rocks and reefs, and setting up observation points on some of the small islands of the Molène archipelago off the coast of Finistère. Hurd measured a 5,994 foot baseline on the island of Béniguet, which was the basis for his triangulation. He made observations on over 50 points, many of which he visited, including East Boissevin rock, about 2 miles from Pointe Saint-Mathieu. Bearings taken included the wreck of the Magnificent, then still visible on the Boufoloc, Pointe St Mathieu lighthouse, Ushant (Ile d'Ouessant), and Bec de la Chèvre and Pointe du Raz, 19 and 22 mile SE and south respectively. Hurd was working in enemy territory. The smaller islands had no permanent military presence, but there were garrisons on Ushant, Molène, and St Matthews, and the last had a heavy battery. In the autumn of 1805, westerley winds prevented Hurd from working in the bay of Brest, and he carried out a survey of Falmouth. He returned to French waters in 1806, surveying the area west of Béniguet, and mapping a new channel leading into the Chenal du Four from the west. Two charts from Hurd's surveys were published in 1809, A Nautical Survey of the bay of Brest and the Ushant Islands and A Survey of the New Channel into the Four Channel from the Bay of Brest. Both charts remained in the Admiralty catalogue until the late 1850s, the former in a revised edition published in 1816.

Throughout his survey work in the Bay of Brest, Hurd was hindered by limitations of resources. In the first two years he had no ship of his own. When in 1806 he was given the use of the Ranger, a revenue cutter, this ship was too small to carry boats. So for the whole period Hurd depended on boats and crews provided by the ships of the inshore squadron. The squadron had been ordered to assist him, and did so, but the crews were not committed to surveying work - he frequently had to brief a new crew, and could not depend on trained assistants. He also felt the boats were too small to accommodate equipment, space for men sounding, and space to lay down charts. He was soon to be in a position to do something about these shortcomings.

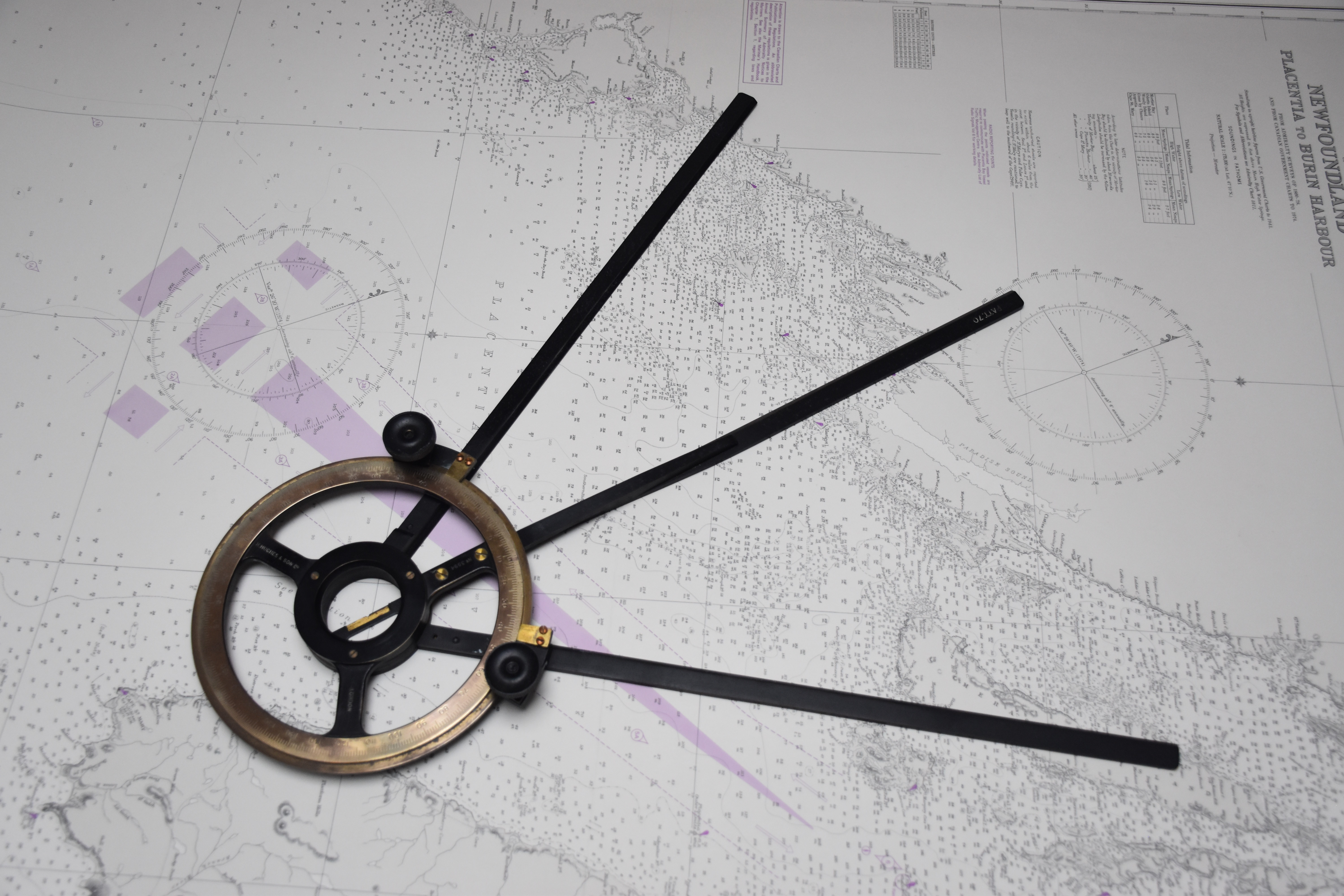
Station pointer

The drawing instrument known as a station pointer had been in use since at least the mid-1780s, but only by a few surveyors such as Murdoch McKenzie Junior and Graeme Spence. Hurd first saw one in 1806, when Spence was using it in the Hydrographic Office in London, and was given permission to order one. A type of extendable protractor, it was particularly useful for plotting multiple soundings whose positions had been determined by horizontal sextant angles between known points, and came into widespread use over the next 10 years.

Charts based on Hurd's surveys
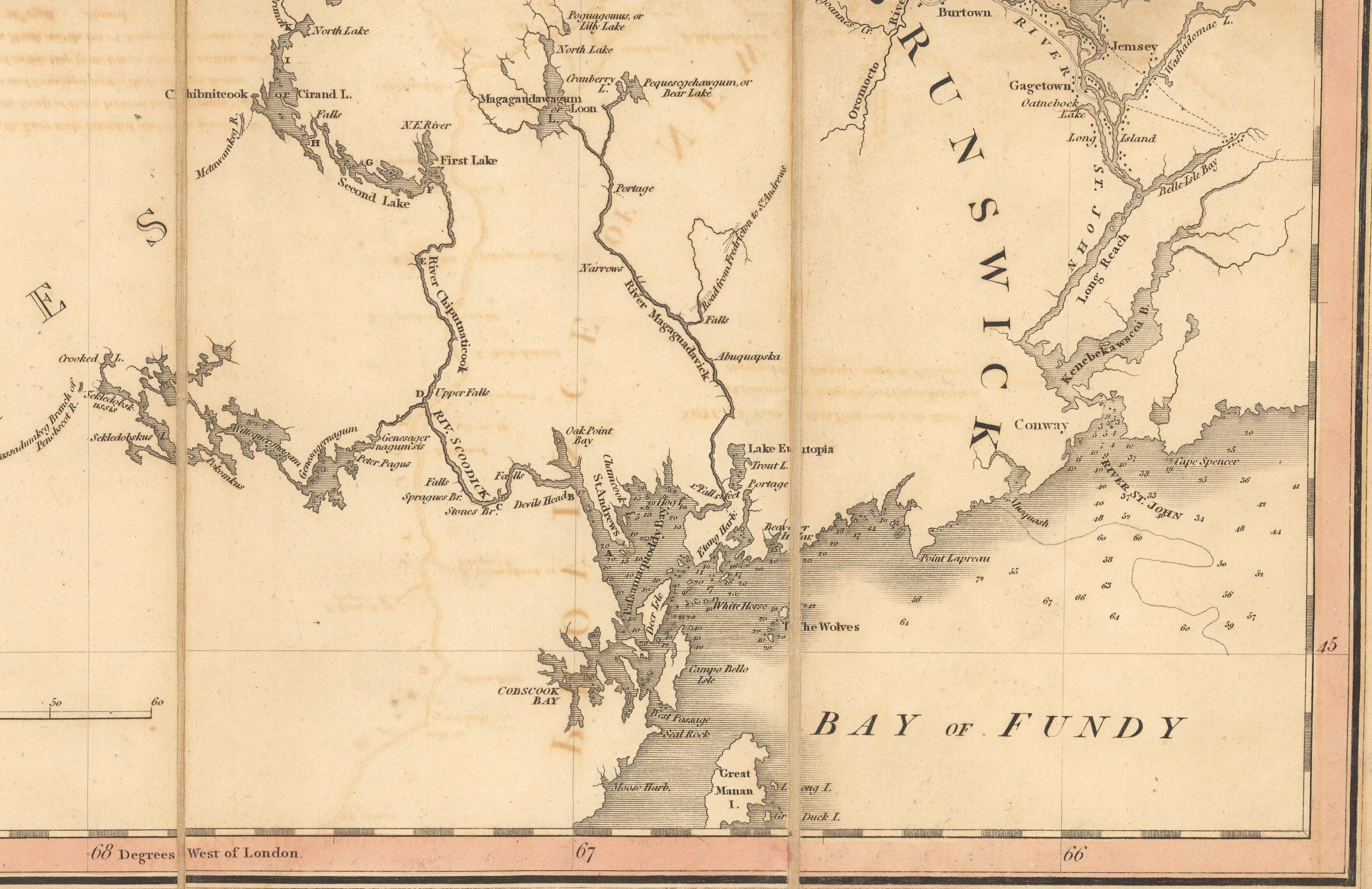
Part of Samuel Holland's chart of Lower Canada, showing the area that Hurd surveyed

1827 Admiralty chart of Bermuda, based on Hurd's survey of 1789-1797

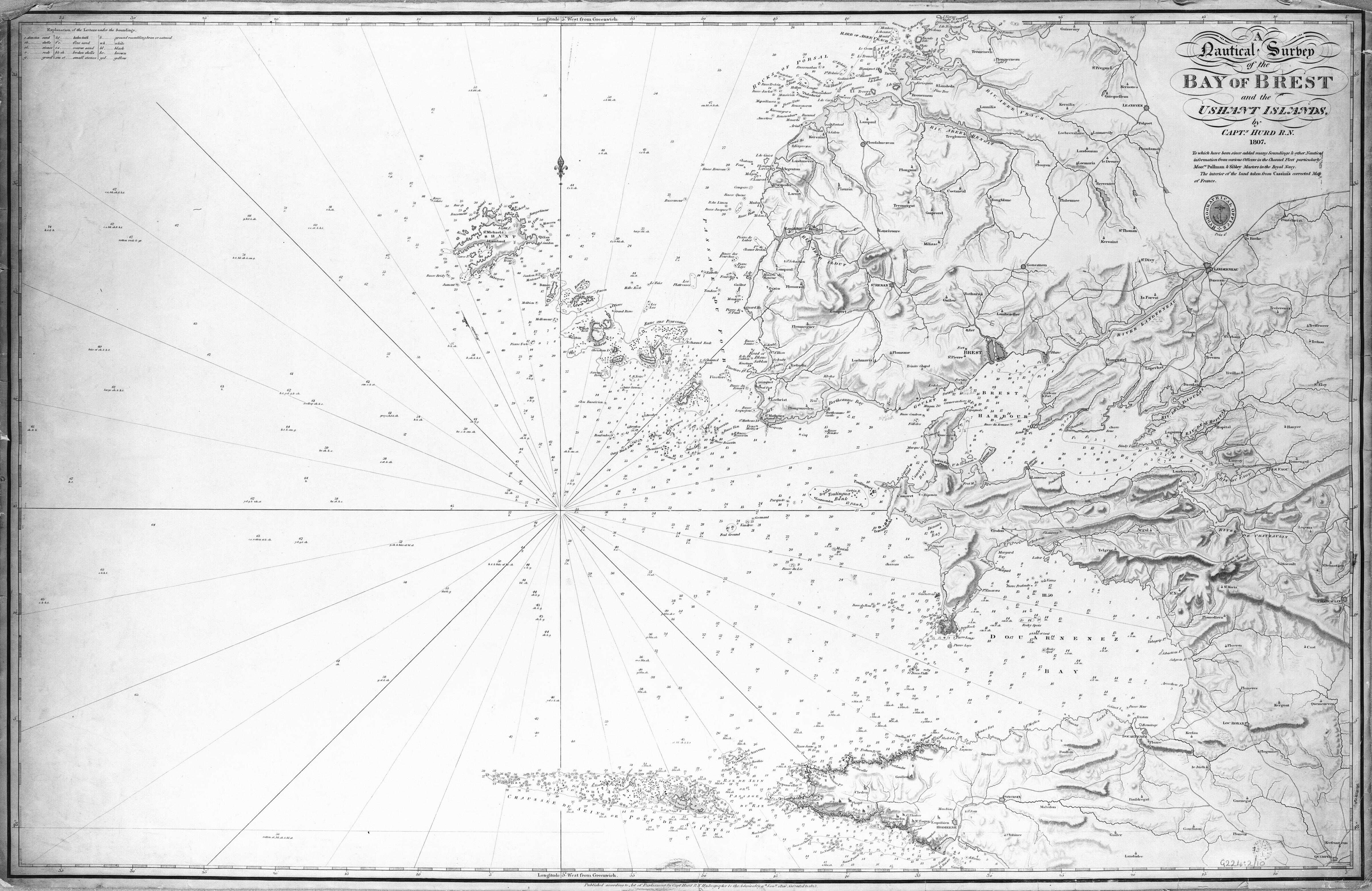
Hurd's chart of Brest and the Ushant Islands. Revised edition published in 1816.

=== Hydrographer of the Navy ===
Alexander Dalrymple had been Hydrographer of the Navy since 1795, when the Hydrographic Office of the Admiralty was established. During Dalrymple's tenure, the Office had no role in commissioning surveys, which remained the responsibility of the Admiralty. Its remit was to catalogue and assess the survey material that had been deposited with the Admiralty and to make it available to Royal Navy ships. A publishing operation was established in 1800, with the acquisition of a printing press and the hiring of engravers. Progress was slow, as the new charts often needed to be compiled from several surveys and from existing charts at different scales, rather than being facsimile reproductions. Dalrymple was also in poor health be this time. In 1807, the Admiralty Board ordered the purchase of all available charts published in England, over 1,000 in all, so that a selection could be made of those that should be issued to the fleet. Dalrymple being unfamiliar with many of the areas covered suggested the formation of a committee to advise on the selection. This was agreed to, and Captains E.N. Columbine, Hurd, and Sir Home Popham were appointed. Relations between Dalrymple and the committee were difficult, and Dalrymple's refusal to cooperate on some issues, and a perception of his declining powers, led to his dismissal by the First Lord of the Admiralty in May 1808. He died three weeks later, aged 70.

Beachy Head to Worthing, an early chart, issued by Hurd in 1810

Hurd was appointed to take his place, and to implement the recommendations of the Chart Committee. He would hold the position of Hydrographer for 15 years. The war with France continued until 1815, and from 1812 Britain was also at war with the United States. Hurd's first task was getting charts and sailing directions out to the fleet. As noted by historian Adrian Webb, this was a major change of policy, as until then it had been the responsibility of a ship's officers to acquire their own charts. It involved both issuing material already held by the Admiralty and the purchase of charts from commercial publishers. Boxes of charts appropriate to the individual stations were prepared, and sent to the naval depots by stagecoach, to ensure speedy delivery. In the next six months, 113 boxes had been sent out, and storage arrangements made at several dockyards. He was very thorough in obtaining useful information, including instructing the purchase of Spanish maps by a navy ship in Cadiz, purchasing Dalrymple's original copper plates from a scrap metal dealer, and obtaining maps of coastal areas from the Ordnance Survey. Coastal surveys of Britain would soon be linked to the triangulation of the Ordnance survey.

Hurd was very concerned to increase the amount and quality of surveying work carried out. Eventually this would lead to the formation of a dedicated surveying service, but at this stage the Hydrographer still had no remit to commission surveys, and could only make recommendations to the Admiralty. His first concern was with home waters, which had been neglected since Graeme Spence had retired in 1803. Hurd suggested William Chapman, a Master. His appointment was approved, together with the provision of a vessel and instruments - a good chronometer, spyglass, sextant (made by Troughton), quicksilver horizon, and azimuth compass. Unfortunately Chapman died on 2 April 1810, and Hurd recommended George Thomas, also a Master, to replace him. Thomas took command of the newly built HMS Investigator in April 1811, and started work surveying the Yarmouth Channels. He would be continually employed in surveying, largely in home waters, until he retired in 1846. Another important area was the western approaches of the English Channel, where Martin White was surveying the Channel Islands. Abroad, surveys continued to be commissioned by the Amiralty or senior officers until 1813, when Hurd recommended that William Henry Smyth be equipped for surveying in Sicily. His work was commended. and he was provided with a vessel in 1816, HMS Aid, later renamed Adventure, in which he carried out surveys of the Greek archipelago.

In 1814, with peace negotiations in progress, Hurd's attention, as with many other military men, turned towards peacetime policies. He wrote an account of the state of hydrography for the Admiralty in which he drew attention to "the great deficiency of our nautical knowledge in almost every part of the world, but more particularly on the coastline of our own Dominions". He suggested that the time was right to address such issues, given the availability of men and ships as the war drew to a close. Resources were indeed committed to surveying after the war ended in 1815. Two more surveying vessels were commissioned in 1816, HMS Protector and HMS Shamrock, and HMS Congo was added as a surveying vessel in 1817. Also in 1817, the Admiralty Board established rates of pay for officers carrying out surveys. As Archibald Day, Hydrographer from 1950 to 1955, remarked: "Thus the Royal Navy's surveying service came into being and its pattern has remained unchanged until the presesent [sic?] day".

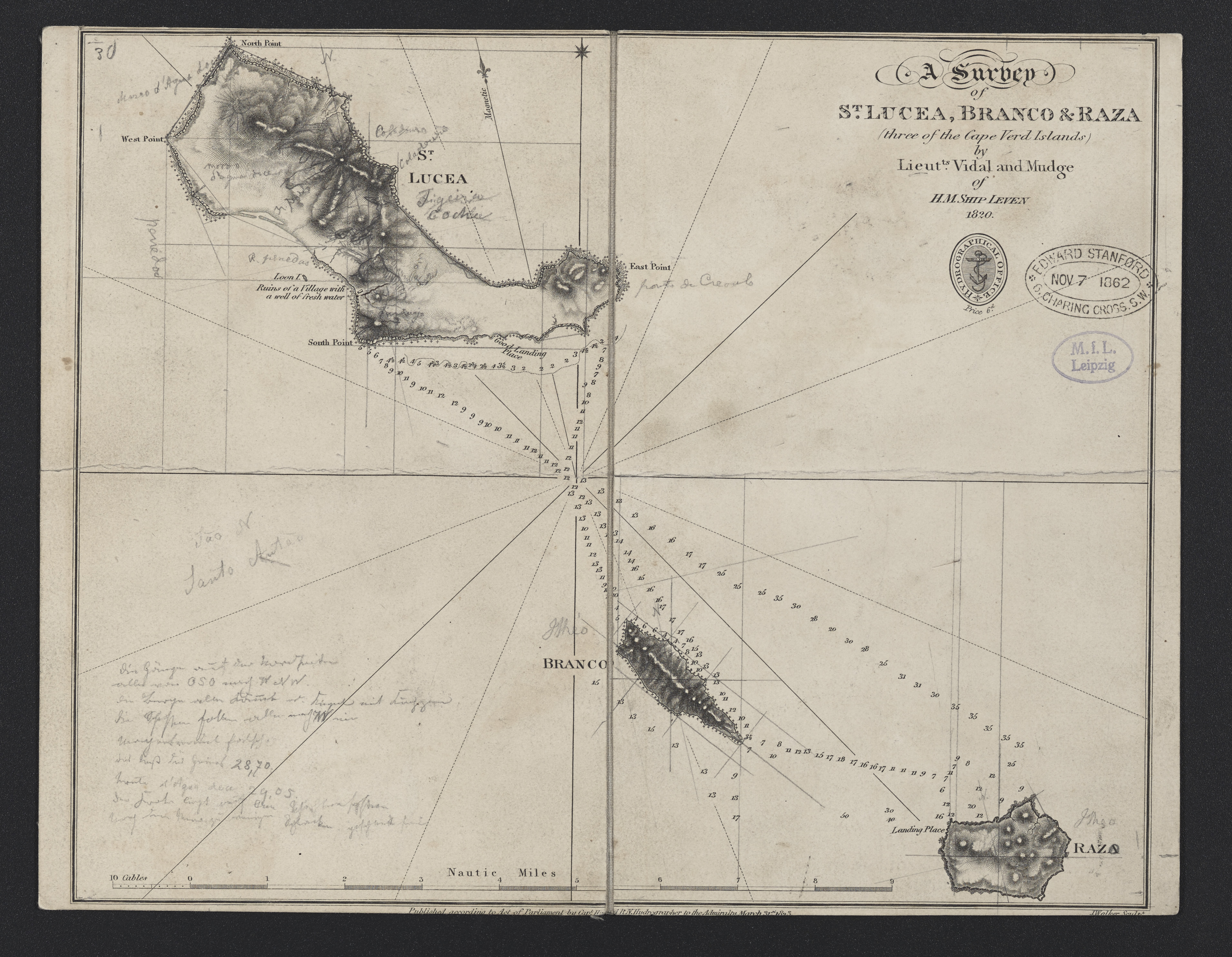
Chart of St. Lucea, Branco & Raza, Cape Verde Islands, published 1823, an early chart on public sale

Since 1816, Hurd had been arguing for making Admiralty charts available for public sale. The revenue generated would enable the office to pay its employees better wages, and would at least partially insulate it from pressures on public expenditure. It would also benefit merchant mariners, who could directly see the value of the Office's work, and encourage its expansion. This was agreed in principle in 1819, and authorised the following year. Hurd prepared a catalogue in 1821, and agents were appointed to sell the charts, which were published from 1822. The catalogue was not published until 1825.

With peace established, Hurd sought to restore international cooperation in Hydrographic affairs. Dalrymple had known Lieutenant Rossel when he was a prisoner in England in 1795. After the wars, now an Admiral, Rossel was appointed the French Hydrographer, and communication was soon established. In 1817 Hurd sent a collection of Admiralty charts to the Spanish Hydrographic Office in order to encourage mutual exchange of charts, and then established good relations with Poul de Løvenørn, the Danish Hydrographer. This cooperation did not extend to the United States. Even after the war ended, they were still regarded as a threat to British interests. In 1827 Edward Parry, Hurd's successor as Hydrographer, noted that "Captain Hurd objected to publishing this survey [of Bermuda], lest it should fall into the hands of the Americans". Also, charts of the Great Lakes were not published, but only supplied to Royal Navy ships.

=== Death and legacy ===
Hurd had been in poor health since 1820, and he died on 29 April 1823, while still in office. He was also a superintendent of chronometers and a commissioner for the discovery of longitude. Hurd was survived by his wife and he left plantations in both America and the West Indies. To his wife he left "enslaved people on Grenada and Dominica that had been given and bequeathed to him by his 'worthy and respected friend' Samuel Proudfoot of Clapham Common".

Michael Barritt, Hydrographer of the Navy from 2001 to 2003 notes that no obituary of him was written until a tribute appeared six years later. Barritt agreed with that tribute in praising Hurd's persistent advocacy of the surveying service. Steve Ritchie, Hydrographer from 1966 to 1971 said that Hurd was a shadowy figure, and continued: "But undoubtedly he was the right man for the job of Hydrographer at the time; he was a practical naval officer with no pretensions to science, in fact the only Hydrographer of the nineteenth century who did not become a Fellow of the Royal Society. His very lack of scientific leanings was a help to him in his task." Roger Morris, Hydrographer from 1985 to 1990, says that by the time of Hurd's death "surveys ordered by the Hydrographer were being made by a corps of specialised seamen Naval officers commanding their own ships which were themselves specially fitted out for surveying. If Dalrymple is the father of the Admiralty Chart, Hurd is undoubtedly the father of the Hydrographic Service."

The Hurd Peninsula is on the south coast of Livingston Island, in the South Shetland Islands. It was named by the UK Antarctic Place-Names Committee in 1961, for Thomas Hurd, RN. Hurd was chosen as it was under his authority that Antarctica was discovered. Hurd's Deep in the English Channel was also named after him.
