= Murdoch McKenzie =

Murdoch McKenzie may refer to:

- Murdoch Mackenzie (cartographer) (1712–1797), Scottish hydrographer and cartographer
- Murdoch McKenzie (Royal Navy officer) (1743–1829), British navy officer
- Murdoch MacKenzie (1600–1688), Scottish minister and prelate
- Murdoch McKenzie (footballer), Scottish footballer

== See also ==
- Murdoch McKenzie Wood (1881–1949), Scottish politician
- Murdoch or Murdo MacKenzie (courtier) (died 1590), builder of Fairburn Tower
