= Thames-class frigate =

Frigate class of the Royal Navy

- Thames-class frigate design

Class overview
- Name: Thames-class frigate
- Builders: Plymouth Dockyard: Joseph Tucker; Chatham Dockyard: Robert Seppings; Woolwich Dockyard: Edward Sison; Deptford Dockyard: Henry Peake; Portsmouth Dockyard: Nicholas Diddams
- Operators: Royal Navy
- Preceded by: Maidstone class
- Cost: Circe: £16,610; Jason: £16,626; Hebe: £15,386; Minerva: £15,017
- Built: 1804–1806
- In service: 1804–1818
- Planned: 8
- Completed: 7
- Canceled: 1

General characteristics
- Type: Fifth-rate frigate
- Tons burthen: 657 88/94 (bm)
- Length: 127 ft (38.7 m) (gundeck); 107 ft 4 in (32.7 m) (keel)
- Beam: 34 ft (10.4 m)
- Depth of hold: 11 ft 9 in (3.6 m)
- Propulsion: Sails
- Complement: 215 (later 220)
- Armament: Gundeck: 26 × 12-pounder guns; QD: 2 × 6-pounder guns + 6 × 24-pounder carronades; Fc: 2 × 6-pounder guns + 2 × 24-pounder carronades

The Thames-class frigate was a 32-gun fifth-rate frigate class of eight ships of the Royal Navy based on the Richmond-class frigate designed by William Bately. The ships were ordered to the older design, which was of a smaller type of ship compared to more modern designs, so that they could be built quickly and cheaply in time to assist in defending against Napoleon's expected invasion of Britain. The class received several design changes to the Richmond class, being built of fir instead of oak, with these changes making the class generally slower and less weatherly than their predecessors, especially when in heavy weather conditions. The first two ships of the class, Pallas and Circe, were ordered on 16 March 1804 with two more ordered on 1 May and the final four on 12 July. The final ship of the class, Medea, was cancelled on 22 October before construction could begin but the other seven ships of the class were commissioned between 1804 and 1806.

While no ship of the class served for a long period, the last being out of service by 1818, the class still provided important service in a wide variety of locations during the Napoleonic War and War of 1812 including the Mediterranean Sea, English Channel, and the Leith, Leeward Islands, Lisbon, Downs, Jamaica, and North America stations. Key actions of the class include Pallas in the Walcheren Campaign, Jason in the action of 22 January 1809, and Circe in the invasion of Martinique.

== Design and construction ==
The Thames class was a revival of William Bately's design of the Richmond class 32-gun frigate from 1756. The Richmond design was brought back for the Royal Navy in 1804 for the Thames-class frigates because of a desire by the First Lord of the Admiralty, Lord St Vincent, to reduce the amount of timber being used in ships, as well as building costs. The size of frigates had expanded greatly in the period since the Richmond class had been created, and so ships built to its measurements were significantly smaller than other modern designs. The smaller size of the class did mean that their construction could be completed at a faster pace than with larger ships, but design of the ships was held up despite this because of difficulty in locating the original blueprints of the Richmond class. The wartime Royal Navy required increased numbers of and cheaper ships more than it needed larger ships of higher quality, in order to combat the probable invasion; doctrine expected the superior skills of Royal Navy crews to overcome the deficiencies created with the smaller classes of vessels such as the Thames class.

The new Thames class differed from the fifty year old Richmond class in some subtle ways; they were built of fir instead of the more standard oak, both to save money on construction and because of a shrinking supply of suitable oak, and had raised gangways and strengthened bulwarks. (Note: There are claims that Thames was constructed with old oak instead of fir. Ships built of fir in this period were more robust than earlier attempts to use that material, the service time of fir-built frigates in the 1800s was not considerably different to that of their oak-built cousins.) Richmond-class frigates had a sharply rising deck at the front in order to stop water from entering through the hawseholes when at sea, but a more rounded bow and the moving of cable ports away from sea level meant that this feature was ignored in the Thames class design. (Note: The rounded bow of the class was again a result of the need to save on materials, with it allowing less complicated pieces of timber to be used.) The ports of the design were also increased in size to allow the fitting of carronades in locations where 6-pound cannon had been located in the Richmond design. As well as this, an order on 10 September 1804 saw the windows of the galleries widened and increased from the five of the Richmond class to six.

Despite these modernising changes some antiquated features from the Richmond class were kept such as sweep ports, holes through which oars could be put to assist in moving the ship, on the lower deck. Most importantly the ships of the class kept the 12-pound guns of the Richmond class. By the time of the construction of the Thames class most frigates were being designed with either 18-pound guns or with more guns than the thirty-two stipulated for the class (ships of thirty-six and thirty-eight guns were becoming more common). This put the class at a statistical disadvantage, being the first new 32-gun 12-pounder frigates built since HMS Triton eight years earlier.

The class was ballasted more deeply than in the Richmond class and because of this the performance of the ships suffered. Between half and one knot was lost, making the speed of the class between nine and a half and twelve knots (17.6–22 km/h) depending on the weather conditions. Despite this the class were still regarded as being quite weatherly, but the excellent heavy weather sailing characteristics of the Richmond class were mostly lost in the Thames class. It was found that the ships were especially hard to handle when stored for long-distance journeys, with six months' provisions creating considerably more difficulty than three month's provisions. (Note: Sailing qualities based on reports on Circe (31 October 1813), Alexandria (7 January 1814), and Minerva (22 May 1814).)

Construction of the class began on 16 March 1804 when the first two ships of a planned eight were ordered, these being Pallas and Circe. The ships of the class were not built at the same location, with construction instead being spread across a variety of naval dockyards in order to increase the speed of production; this saw the first two frigates built at Plymouth Dockyard, with later examples built at Chatham, Woolwich, Deptford, and Portsmouth. All ships of the class were constructed to the following dimensions: 127 feet (38.7 m) along the gun deck, 107 feet 4 inches (32.7 m) at the keel, with a beam of 34 feet (10.4 m) and a depth in the hold of 11 feet 9 inches (3.6 m). (Note: Ships of the class built at Plymouth had a 'marginally different framing scheme'.) They measured 657 88/94 tons burthen. They were to have a crew of 215 men, with this later being increased to 220. Initially the armament of the class was set at twenty-six 12-pounders on the gundeck, two 6-pounders and six 24-pound carronades on the quarterdeck, and two 6-pounders and two 24-pound carronades on the forecastle. All 6-pounders planned for the Thames class were replaced with four extra 24-pound carronades before the first ship was completed. No other changes were made to the armament of the class and all completed ships used this unaltered throughout their service.

== Ships ==
| Ship name | Builder | Ordered | Laid down | Launched | Commissioned | Fate | Ref. |
|---|---|---|---|---|---|---|---|
| Circe | Plymouth Dockyard | 16 March 1804 | June 1804 | 17 November 1804 | November 1804 | Sold at Portsmouth 20 August 1814 | |
| Pallas | Plymouth Dockyard | 16 March 1804 | June 1804 | 17 November 1804 | December 1804 | Wrecked off the Isle of May 18 December 1810 | |
| Thames | Chatham Dockyard | 1 May 1804 | July 1804 | 24 October 1805 | November 1805 | Broken up at Plymouth October 1816 | |
| Alexandria | Portsmouth Dockyard | 1 May 1804 | October 1804 | 18 February 1806 | February 1806 | Broken up at Sheerness July 1818 | |
| Jason | Woolwich Dockyard | 12 July 1804 | August 1804 | 21 November 1804 | November 1804 | Broken up at Plymouth July 1815 | |
| Hebe | Deptford Dockyard | 12 July 1804 | August 1804 | 31 December 1804 | February 1805 | Sold at Deptford 28 April 1813 | |
| Minerva | Deptford Dockyard | 12 July 1804 | August 1804 | 25 October 1805 | November 1805 | Broken up at Sheerness February 1815 | |
| Medea | Chatham Dockyard | 12 July 1804 | — | | | Cancelled 22 October 1804 | |

=== Pallas ===
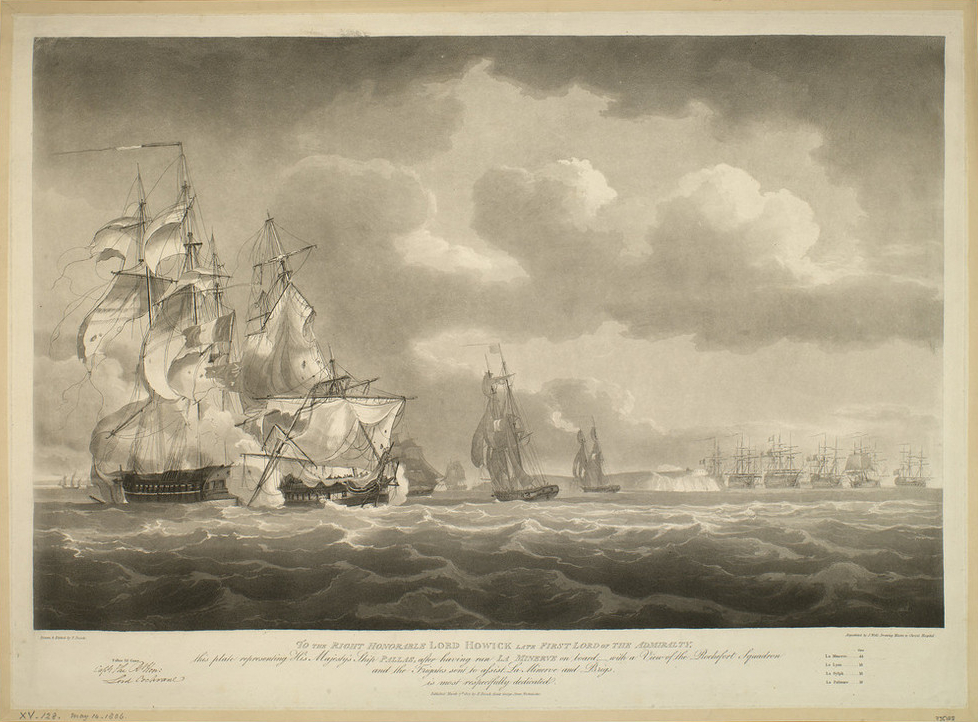
Pallas engages a French frigate on 14 May 1806

Pallas was commissioned in December 1804 by Captain Lord Cochrane. She initially served on the Lisbon Station where she took two Spanish ships off the Azores in early February 1805 and on 16 February the Spanish privateer La Preciosa. On 5 April 1806 she cut out the French 14-gun La Tapageuse from the Gironde and then on 6 April she destroyed the 18-gun La Malicieuse, 24-gun La Garonne, and 22-gun La Gloire in the Garonne. Three days after this Pallas took five vessels including two chasse-marées. In May Captain George Miller took command from Lord Cochrane, at which point she would serve in the English Channel based at Plymouth. On 6 May 1807 Pallas took the French privateer L'Alerte and later in the year command of Pallas changed to Captain John Ommanney before Captain George Seymour took over in March 1808, with Pallas still serving in the Channel. In April 1809 she participated in the Battle of the Basque Roads initially by supporting the fire ships of the fleet and then by taking part in the actions of Lord Cochrane's inshore squadron attacking grounded ships of the French fleet.

In June 1809 Captain William Dobbie temporarily assumed command of Pallas; she then participated in the initial stages of the Walcheren Campaign before Captain George Cadogan arrived to replace Dobbie in October. Under Cadogan Pallas participated in the evacuation of the British force after the failure of the Walcheren Campaign, with Pallas assembling and embarking the rearguard of the army. In May 1810 Pallas began serving off the coast of Norway under Captain James Bowen before changing command to Captain Pringle Stoddart, under whom she took two privateers in October, and then finally in November to Captain George Monke. On 13 December the ship's boats took two Danish privateers in Siveragg Fjord. On 18 December Pallas was returning to her base at Leith when her pilot confused the light of a lime kiln on the coast for the Isle of May lighthouse, resulting in Pallas being wrecked near Dunbar.

=== Circe ===
Circe was commissioned in November 1804 by Captain Jonas Rose to serve off the coast of Portugal. On 1 March 1805 Circe took the Spanish 4-gun privateer Fama off Porto and then on 21 June she took the French 10-gun privateer Le Constance. At the end of 1805 Circe sailed for the Leeward Islands Station with command changing to Captain Hugh Pigot at the beginning of 1806. On 5 April 1807 Circe captured the French 18-gun privateer brig Austerlitz off Barbados after a chase of eighteen hours; Austerlitz was the most successful privateer sailing from Guadeloupe and had evaded many attempts to capture her in the past. (Note: Rif Winfield has Austerlitz being captured on 5 April 1806.) On 2 March 1808 landing parties from Circe, the frigate HMS Cerberus, and the post ship HMS Camilla attacked and captured the French island of Marie-Galante to stop it being used by privateers. Sailing off Diamond Rock on 31 October, Circe chased and captured the storm damaged French corvette Palineur after an action of fifteen minutes where one man from Circe and seven Frenchmen were killed. She found continued success towards the end of the year, assisting in the destruction of the French 18-gun brig Cygne on 12 December after a failed cutting out expedition from the boats of Circe had resulted in fifty-six casualties.

In February 1809 Circe participated in the invasion of Martinique and in the same month her command was given to Captain Francis Augustus Collier who replaced the acting captaincy of Commander Charles Kerr. In July Captain Edward Woolcombe replaced Collier and on 17 February 1810 Circe sailed for the Mediterranean Sea where she would serve until the end of 1811. By July 1812 she was at Portsmouth, from where she sailed again for the Leeward Islands on 15 November. As part of the War of 1812 she took the American 5-gun privateer Lovely Lass on 14 May 1813 and by 1814 she was to be found in ordinary at Portsmouth, from where she was sold for £1,900 on 20 August.

=== Thames ===
Thames was expected to be commissioned by Captain John Loring but a delay in such meant that Thames's first captain was actually Captain Bridges Taylor, who commissioned Thames in November 1805. Thames initially served on the Downs Station before briefly serving on the Jamaica Station and in the Mediterranean from 3 March 1807. In April 1808 Thames returned to Portsmouth where Captain George Waldegrave assumed command and then sailed again for the Mediterranean. On 27 July 1810 Thames was serving alongside the sloops HMS Pilot and HMS Weazel; together they drove an enemy convoy ashore at Amantea and took six gunboats, two large galleys, and twenty-eight transports with their subsequent landing parties. The destruction of the convoy halted Joachim Murat's planned invasion of Sicily. From June 1810 Thames served with the sloop HMS Cephalus; on 16 June a convoy the ships had been following was found beached at Cetraro and a landing party of 180 men burned the entire convoy. After this command of Thames transferred to Captain Charles Napier.

On 20 July 1811 Thames and Cephalus attacked and captured the fort at Porto del Infrischi and in turn captured eleven gunboats, an armed felucca, and fourteen merchant vessels. In September Thames came under the orders of Captain Henry Duncan in HMS Imperieuse and together they captured ten Neapolitan gunboats at Palinuro on 2 November. In the spring of 1812 Napier became the senior naval officer on the coast of Calabria and as such Thames and Pilot captured Sapri on 14 May after a two-hour bombardment, capturing twenty-nine merchant vessels. In February 1813 it was found that the island of Ponza was a hub for enemy privateers and so on 16 February Thames and the frigate HMS Furieuse embarked two battalions of soldiers and landed them under fire at Ponza on 26 February. With support from the frigates the soldiers took the heights of the island, inducing its governor to surrender.

In April Captain John Purvis replaced Napier in command, taking Thames to Sheerness where she was refitted as a troopship between August 1813 and January 1814 to serve on the North America Station under the command of Commander Kenelm Somerville. In August 1814 Thames, now under Commander Charles Leonard Irby, participated in the expedition up the Patuxent River to attack the Chesapeake Bay Flotilla, which resulted in the burning of Washington. In May 1815 Thames returned to England under the command of Commander William Walpole and was broken up at Plymouth in October 1816.

=== Jason ===
Jason was commissioned in November 1804 by Captain William Champain. On 26 March 1805 she sailed to serve on the Leeward Islands Station where she would initially serve as the flagship of Commodore Alexander Cochrane. On 13 October Jason captured the French 16-gun corvette Naïade off Barbados after a chase of nine hours. She was one of the largest ships of her type in the French navy and was bought into the Royal Navy as HMS Melville. In January 1807 command of Jason changed to Captain Thomas John Cochrane and on 27 January Jason successfully found and engaged the sloop HMS Favourite which had recently been captured by the French. After a short engagement Favourite surrendered to Jason, who had only one man wounded in the engagement, and she was brought back into the Royal Navy as HMS Goree. On 1 June a boat party under her first lieutenant successfully destroyed a battery near Aguadilla, Puerto Rico despite taking heavy casualties.

At the end of August Jason was in harbour at New York; a boat from Jason was sent ashore and immediately surrounded by a crowd of Americans who successfully invited the seamen to desert, attempting to tar and feather the lieutenant in command of the boat when he looked to intervene. The crew back on board Jason then mutinied as well, locking the ship's officers away to give them time to lower boats and escape. A group of loyal sailors including Jason's first lieutenant broke free and forced the mutineers down into the ship where they surrendered; forty-five men of Jason were sent to Halifax to be court martialled. In January 1809 Captain William Maude assumed command of Jason. On 22 January she was serving on the blockade of Guadeloupe when the French 44-gun frigate Topaze was sighted by the frigate HMS Cleopatra; Jason, Cleopatra, and the sloop HMS Hazard engaged her, and she struck soon after Jason had ranged up on her and begun firing. Topaze was bought into the Royal Navy as HMS Jewel.

In June Captain James William King took command of Jason, and until 1814 she served variously in the North and Baltic seas, at Gibraltar, and again on the Leeward Islands Station. In April 1814 Jason became the flagship of Admiral the Duke of Clarence and escorted Alexander I of Russia, Frederick William III of Prussia, and Louis XVIII of France to France upon the latter's restoration. In July 1815 Jason was broken up at Plymouth.

=== Hebe ===
Hebe was commissioned in February 1805 by Captain Micajah Malbon to serve on the Downs Station. (Note: 'Malbon' also spelt 'Malcolm'.) On 17 July Hebe participated in the build-up to the Battle of Cape Finisterre in actions off Gravelines. By 1808 Hebe was under the command of Captain John Fyffe on the Jamaica Station. (Note: Rif Winfield claims that from September 1806 Hebe came under the command of Captain Volant Vashon Ballard, but he mistakes Hebe for HMS Blonde which had been renamed from HMS Hebe in December 1805.) Fyffe left Hebe in 1811 and by 1812 she was in ordinary at Woolwich. On 28 April 1813 Hebe was sold at Deptford for £2,075.

=== Minerva ===
Minerva was commissioned in November 1805 by Captain Charles Feilding to serve in the English Channel. In February 1806 Captain George Collier assumed command of Minerva and on 27 April Minerva took the Spanish 14-gun privateer La Finisterre off Cape Finisterre. On 22 June the boats of Minerva took a fort of eight guns guarding five merchant ships in Finisterre Bay, successfully bringing off the ships as well after destroying the fort. Minerva continued operations on the coast around Finisterre with her boats through October, taking in this time the lugger Buena Dicha, two chasse-marées, and another lugger. On 17 February 1807 Minerva recaptured the schooner HMS Jackdaw, and Captain Richard Hawkins replaced Collier in April. In August 1808 Minerva was serving on the Brest blockade, where she assisted in running ashore the French 40-gun frigate L'Artemise.

On 23 September off Corunna Minerva chased the Spanish 8-gun letter of marque Josephine for seventy-five miles before catching her, at which point Josephine capsized and all but sixteen of the crew drowned. A month later Minerva took the 14-gun L'Amethyste and then sailed for the Newfoundland Station on 6 May 1811 from where she escorted a convoy to the West Indies, returning on 9 November 1812. Minerva was put in ordinary at Sheerness in 1814 and broken up there in February 1815.

=== Alexandria ===
Alexandria was commissioned in February 1806 by Captain Edward King. On 12 June she sailed for the Leeward Islands Station, as part of which her boats took part in an attack on Spanish ships at Río de la Plata on 23 August. King died on 25 September 1807 and in January 1808 Captain Nathaniel Day Cochrane took command of Alexandria for service in the North and Baltic seas. By February 1810 Captain John Quilliam had assumed command, under whom Alexandria continued to serve in the Baltic on whale fishing protection duties. In November Quilliam was replaced by Captain Robert Cathcart and Alexandria sailed for the Leith Station. On 19 July 1813, during the War of 1812, Alexandria and the sloop HMS Spitfire discovered the American frigate USS President and the privateer schooner Scourge off the North Cape and until 23 July attempted to close with and attack the Americans, but failed to stop their escape. (Note: Commodore John Rogers of USS President later claimed that the ships chasing him were a ship of the line and a frigate.) Alexandria was put in ordinary at Sheerness in December 1813 and fitted as a receiving ship there in January 1817. There Alexandria stayed until she was broken up in July 1818.

=== Medea ===
Medea was intended to be built by Robert Seppings at Chatham Dockyard as the last of the Thames-class frigates. The construction of Medea was cancelled on 22 October 1804 before she was laid down or any work begun.
