= Hurd's Deep =

Underwater Valley in the English Channel

Coordinates: 49°30′N 3°34′W

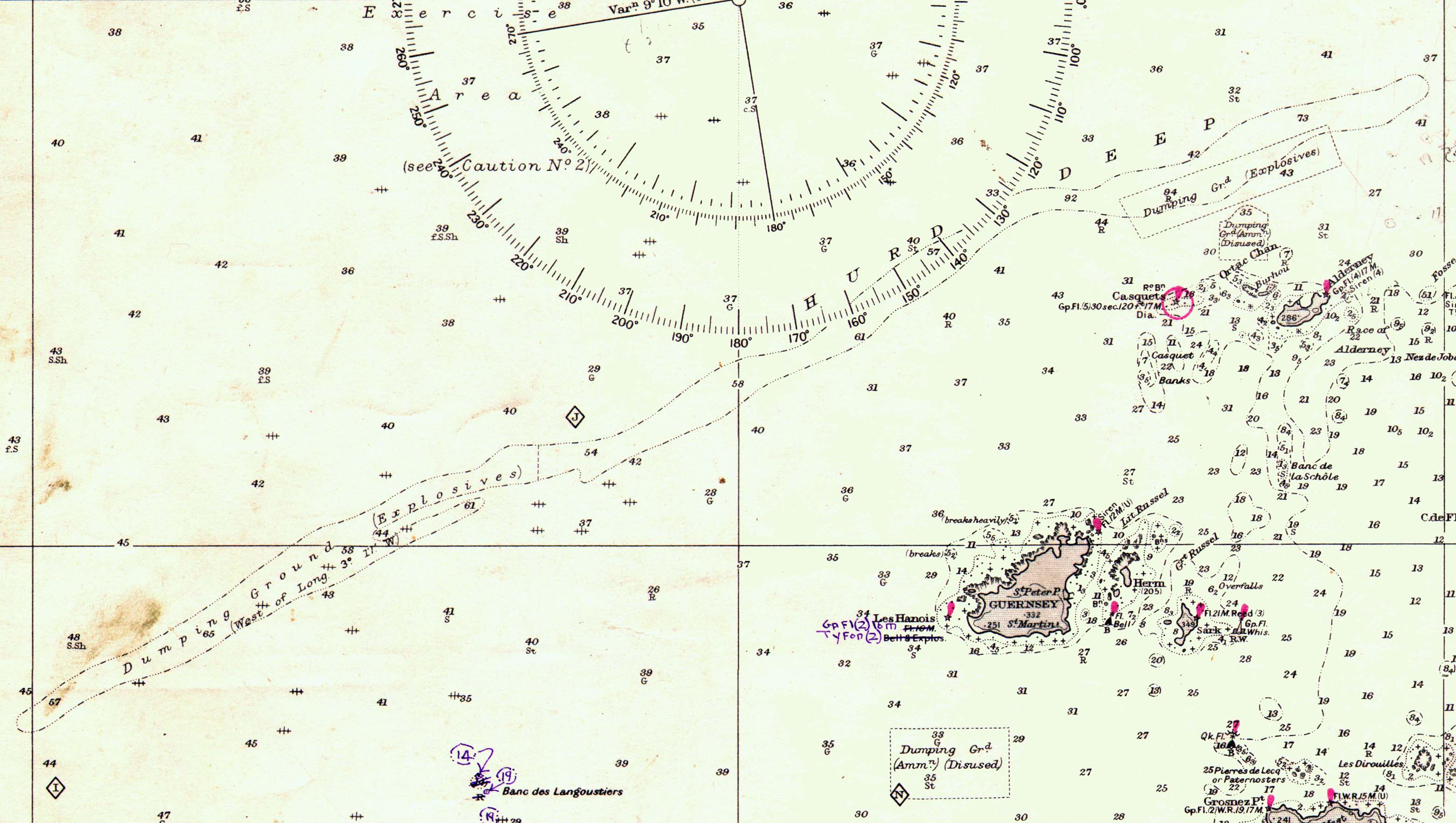
Hurd Deep running from bottom left to top right of an extract from a 1955 Admiralty Chart

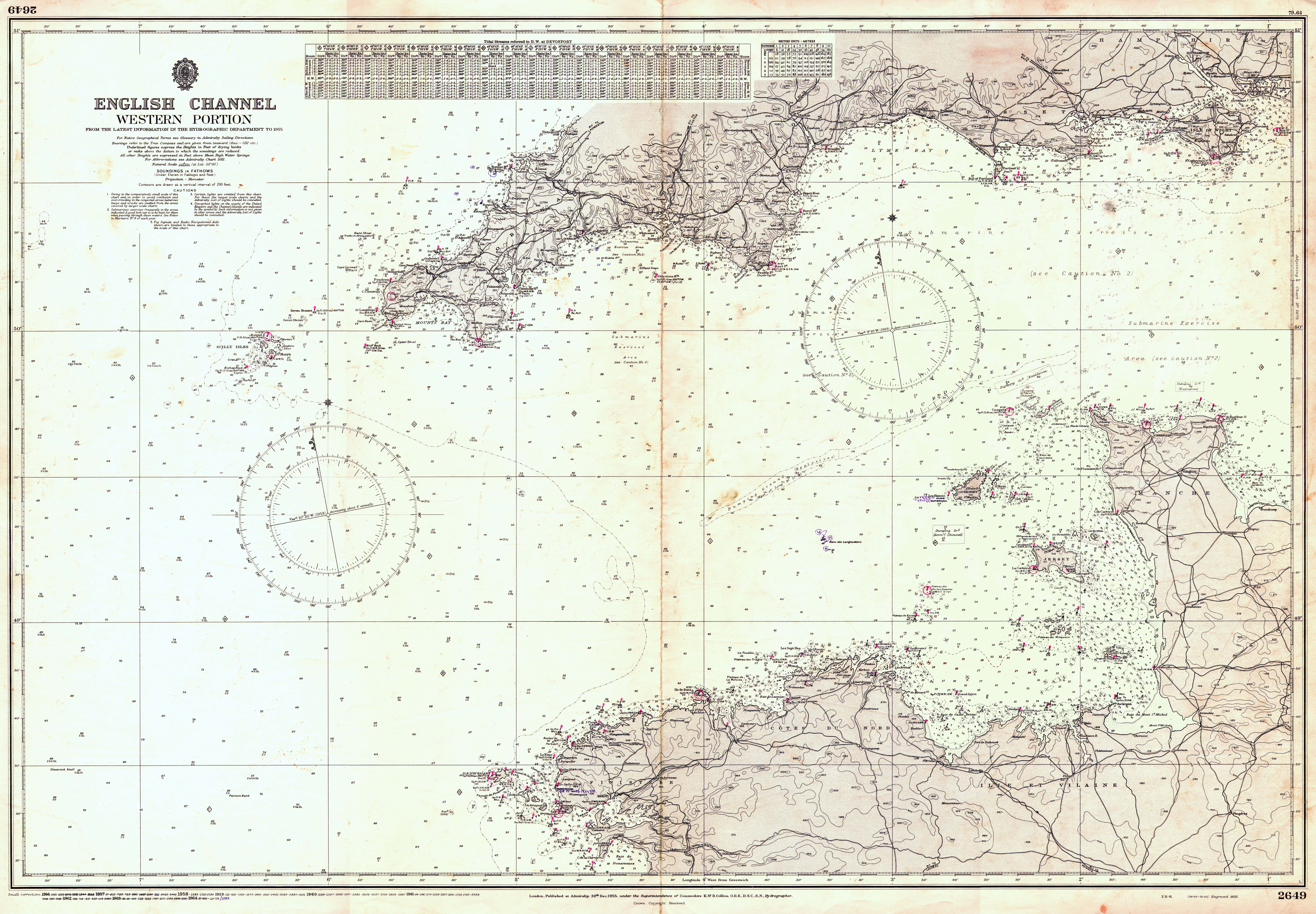
1955 Admiralty Chart No 2649 showing Hurd Deep in the context of the English Channel

Hurd's Deep (or Hurd Deep) is an underwater valley in the English Channel, northwest of the Channel Islands. Its maximum depth is about 180 m (590 ft; 98 fathoms), making it the deepest point in the English Channel.

== Toponym ==
The feature was named after the British Royal Naval Captain Thomas Hurd (1747–1823), who was the second Hydrographer of the Navy. It was chosen by the RN marine cartographer Admiral Martin White.

== Geology ==
Hurd's deep began to form in the Pleistocene of the late Quaternary period (in the last 750,000 - 500,000 years). Successive melting periods after ice ages caused water to gouge out a deep water trench through a river valley system that now forms the seabed in the eastern part end of the English Channel. At some point a catastrophic flood from the southern North Sea basin created Hurd's Deep. It's believed that the collapse of a chalk ridge that once dammed the Strait of Dover let flood waters from a huge proglacial lake flow through the former river systems scouring down to the bedrock forming the trench.

During the Last Glacial Period, which ended 11,700 years ago, sea levels dropped again to the point that the English Channel became an area of river valleys. Due to its depth, Hurd's Deep likely remained flooded by seawater. It might have been a glacial refugium.

Hurd's Deep has an approximate length of 150 kilometres (80 nautical miles) with a width of between 2 and 5 km (1 and 2 1/2 nmi). It terminates abruptly at the western end. The seafloor around the trench is typically flat with a depth range of 70–90 m (230–300 ft; 40–50 fathoms). But within the trench the maximum depth is 170 m (560 ft; 93 fathoms). Hurd's Deep is the deepest point in the English Channel.

== History ==
=== Deep sea ordnance disposal ===
Following the First World War, Hurd's Deep was used by the British Government as a dumping ground for both chemical and conventional munitions. Following the Second World War, it was used to dump military equipment, munitions and weaponry left behind by the ousted German invaders of the Channel Islands. Routine dumping of British munitions carried on until 1974. (Note: Admiralty Chart No 2649 English Channel Western Portion of 1955 shows munitions have been dumped there but cannot confirm further details)

Between 1946 and 1973 the area was also used for the dumping of low- and intermediate-level radioactive wastes. 28,500 barrels of waste – including plutonium, which has a half-life of 24,100 years – were disposed of into the Deep during this period.

=== Wrecks ===
SMS Baden was scuttled there in 1921. The British submarine HMS Affray sank in Hurd's Deep in 1951 with the loss of 75 lives.

== In popular culture ==
In Harry Collingwood's science fiction stories about the Flying-Fish airship-submarine, the Flying-Fish is hidden in Hurd's Deep between adventures. (Note: The three stories are: The Log of the ‘Flying Fish’: A Story of Aerial and Submarine Peril and Adventure (1887); With Airship and Submarine: A Tale of Adventure (1907); The Cruise of the 'Flying-Fish': The Airship-Submarine (1924))
