= HMS Pallas (1804) =

Frigate of the Royal Navy

History

United Kingdom
- Name: HMS Pallas
- Builder: Plymouth Dockyard
- Launched: 17 November 1804
- Fate: Wrecked in the Firth of Forth on 18 December 1810

General characteristics
- Class & type: 32-gun fifth rate Thames-class frigate
- Tons burthen: 657 bm
- Length: 127 ft (39 m) (overall); 107 ft 4 in (32.72 m) (keel)
- Beam: 34 ft 6 in (10.52 m)
- Depth of hold: 11 ft 9 in (3.58 m)
- Complement: 220
- Armament: Upper deck: 26 × 12-pounder guns; QD: 8 × 24-pounder carronades; Fc: 4 × 24-pounder carronades

HMS Pallas was a 32-gun fifth rate Thames-class frigate of the Royal Navy, launched in 1804 at Plymouth.

== History ==
Pallas was one of the seven Thames class frigates ordered for the fleet in early 1804. Her keel was laid at Plymouth Dockyard in June 1804 and she was launched on the afternoon of 17 November the same year along with her sister-ship HMS Circe. Pallas entered service in January 1805, under the command of Lord Cochrane and proceeded to cruise in the vicinity of the Azores. Here, Pallas captured three Spanish merchant ships and a Spanish 14-gun privateer.

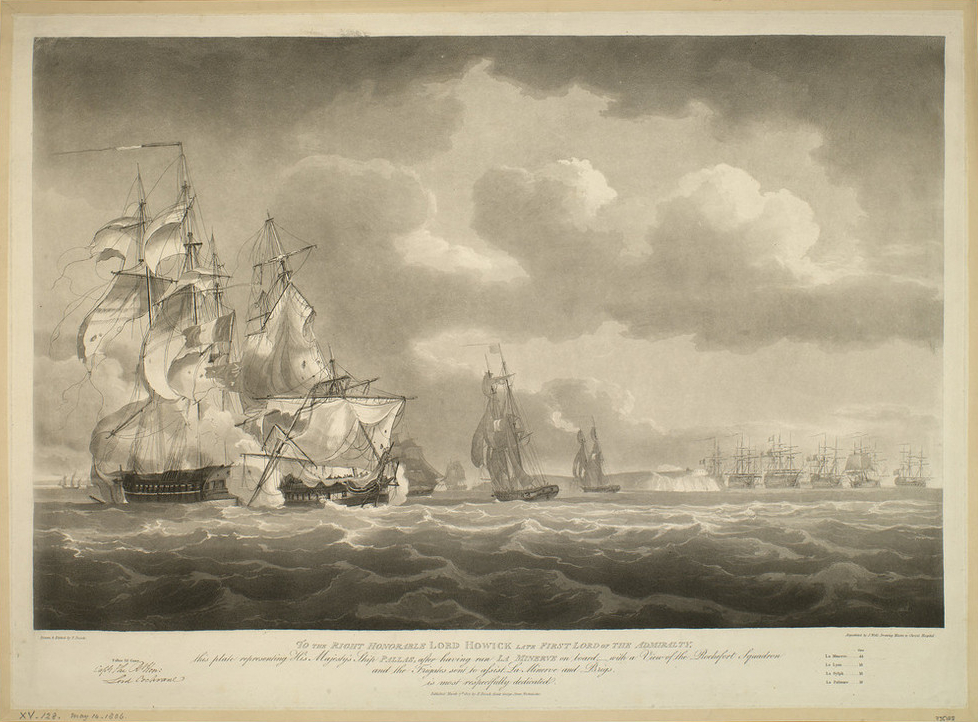
A view of HMS Pallas passing under the batteries of the Île-d'Aix on 14 May 1806. Pallas (second right), after having run La Minerve on board

Cochrane was given orders to cruise off the Normandy coast in 1806. During the evening of 5 April 1806, Cochrane sailed Pallas into the Gironde estuary and captured the French 14-gun Tapageuse, and drove ashore and wrecked three other corvettes. The corvettes Cochrane drove ashore were one of 24 guns, one of 22 guns, and Malicieuse, of 18 guns. Earlier, while on the station, Pallas had captured two chasse marees, Dessaix and L'Île Deais, and wrecked a third, and captured one brig, Pomone, and burnt a second.

In 1807, command passed to George Miller. Later that year she passed to George Cadogan and took part in the evacuation of the British Army from Walcheren. In 1808, George Francis Seymour took command and operated in the English Channel as part of the Channel Fleet.

Captain the Hon. George Cadogan took command of Pallas on 16 September 1809, having transferred from Crocodile. In 1810, Pallas was ordered to the North Sea and was given a cruise off the coast of Norway where she captured four Danish privateer cutters. One 13 December her boats captured two, one of four guns and one of two, both in the Cove of Siveraag.

== Fate ==
Pallas was under the command of Captain G.P. Monke when she was wrecked in the Firth of Forth near Dunbar on the night of 18 December 1810. The pilot mistook the light on a lime kiln at Broxmouth for that kept burning on the Isle of May, and the light on the island for that on the Bell Rock. Dunbar Lifeboat saved 45 men from HMS Pallas in two trips and, in attempting a third, was 'upset and drowned nearly all'. Pallas lost 11 men in the sinking.

The subsequent court martial severely reprimanded Monke and the pilot, James Burgess, for the loss. It also dismissed the master, David Glegg, and ordered that he never serve as master again.

Pallas had been in company with Nymphe, which also wrecked that night, though without loss of life. Nymphe wrecked on a rock called the Devil's Ark near Skethard on Tor Ness Dunbar.
