= French cutter Mutin (1778) =

History

France
- Name: Mutin
- Builder: Dunkirk
- Laid down: June 1778
- Launched: November 1778
- Captured: 2 October 1779

Great Britain
- Name: HMS Mutine
- Acquired: 2 October 1779 by capture
- Renamed: HMS Pigmy 20 January 1798
- Honours and awards: Naval General Service Medal with clasp "Egypt"
- Fate: Wrecked 10 August 1805

General characteristics
- Class & type: Mutin-class cutter
- Type: Cutter
- Tons burthen: 2159/94 (bm)
- Length: Overall: 76 ft 11 1/4 in (23.5 m); Keel: 59 ft 5 1/4 in (18.1 m)
- Beam: 26 ft 1 in (8.0 m)
- Depth of hold: 10 ft 1 in (3.1 m)
- Complement: French service: 84 (but 120 at capture); British service:70
- Armament: French service: 14 guns; British service: 14 × 4-pounder guns + 10 × 1/2-pounder swivel guns

Mutin was a 14-gun cutter of the French Navy, the lead ship of the Mutin class of five naval cutters. She was launched in 1778 and the Royal Navy captured her the next year, taking her into service as HMS Mutine. The Royal Navy renamed her HMS Pigmy in 1798. She was lost in 1805.

== Career ==
On 17 August 1779 Mutin accepted the surrender of the British cutter Active in the Channel. Active had encountered the combined Franco-Spanish fleet in the English Channel and was unable to escape.

HMS Jupiter captured Mutin, along with her sister Pilote, on 2 October after having dismasted Mutin by gunfire. At the time of her capture Mutin was under the command of Chevalier de Roquefeuil.

=== Royal Navy service ===
Between 16 November 1779 and 13 December 1780, she was at Portsmouth, being fitted. The Royal Navy named and registered her as HMS Mutine on 22 January 1780. Lieutenant Samuel Cox commissioned her in October 1779 for the North Sea.

Mutine shared with His Majesty's cutters Rambler and Griffin in the capture on 30 December 1780 of the French privateer General Ville Pateaux.

From March 1782 she was under the command of Lieutenant James Hills. On 6 October she captured the French privateer lugger Compte de Valentinois and delivered it to Admiralty control at Spithead. Count de Valentinois was armed with two 3-pounder guns and eight swivel guns. She had a crew of 31 men under the command of Captain Le Dos and had sailed from Cherbourg the previous evening. She had captured nothing prior to encountering Mutine.

In May 1783 Lieutenant Robert Watson replaced Hills. Watson remained in command until Mutine was paid off in 1787 and transferred to Plymouth Dockyard for repairs. There was no work on the ship until 1789, when she underwent an extensive refit at a cost of £3,884.

Mutine was recommissioned in October 1789 under Lieutenant Humphrey West and detailed for Mediterranean service in 1790. From July 1795 she was assigned to the squadron led by Admiral Horatio Nelson, then in position off the coast of Genoa.

=== French Revolutionary Wars ===
In January 1797 Lieutenant William Shepheard replaced West. Mutine was renamed Pigmy in 1798. She shared with Arethusa, Netley and the cutter Trial in the proceeds from the detention of two vessels under neutral colours, Federick Molk and Vrow Judith, on 18 and 21 August.

On 8 January 1799, at noon, Pigmy was two miles SE of Durlston Head when she sighted a cutter and two brigs. Pigmy gave chase and at 1:40 succeeded in recapturing the two brigs, Lark and Dion. After securing these two vessels Pigmy continued the chase with the result that at 4pm she succeeded in capturing the French privateer cutter Rancune. Rancune was armed with two swivel guns and had a crew of 21 men under the command of Antoine François Victor Joseph Panpeville. She was 26 hours out of Cherbourg and the two brigs were her sole captures. Lark, Francis Artis, master, was sailing from Cardiff to London with a cargo of bar iron. Dion, Esdras Best, master, was on the same route and with the same cargo.captured the French privateer Rancune. For the remainder of the year, Pygmy operated in Quiberon Bay supporting the Royalist by bringing arms and money.

Pigmy shared with Anson, Boadicea, Severn, and Sheerness, and the hired armed cutter Telemachus in the capture of four vessels:

- St Francois, taken 25 December 1799;
- St Pierre de Carnac, taken 12 January 1800;
- a brig of unknown name, taken 17 January 1800; and
- Anna Louisa, taken 22 January 1800.

In May 1800 Pigmy was part of the Royal Navy squadron assisting at the siege of Genoa. She shared with numerous other British vessels in the proceeds of the row galley cut out by their boats on 21 May, the capture on 23 May of the St Jean Baptiste, the capture of the ketch Albanaise on 4 June that the Royal Navy took into service, and the surrender of the city that same day. (Note: A petty officer's share of the prize money for Albanaise was worth 7s 4d; a seaman's share was worth 1s 3d. There was also an allocation of prize money for sundry vessels carrying corn that came into Genoa between 4 and 16 June. A petty officer's share of the prize money was worth 3s 6d; a seaman's share was worth 8d.)

On 20 July 1800, Pigmy was in company Speedy, under the command of Lord Cochrane, in the Mediterranean. They captured the Imperial tartane Madonna Moseti Petro, which was sailing to Cabrera with a cargo of wood.

On 28 August 1800, the brig Corso, Lieutenant W. Ricketts, commander, and Pigmy were at Cesenatico. Their orders were to destroy the vessels in its harbour, and "make a proper example of the town." The British were unable to approach closely enough so during the night of 30 August Ricketts sent in boats of both vessels under the overall command of Lieutenant James Lucas Yeo, first lieutenant of Corso. The attackers were able to capture the town, sink two boats, and burn 11 others. One of the sunken vessels was deeply laden with copper, money, and bale goods. Four of the vessels sank in the mouth of the harbour, and fire consumed both piers. The British sailors were able to hold off some French infantry, but when Ricketts observed French cavalry approaching he ordered the boats to withdraw.

Afterwards, Ricketts sent the authorities of the town the following note:

To the Inhabitants of Cesenatico.

The Treachery of your Municipality, in causing to be arrested an Officer with Dispatches, has been long known to the British Admiral in these Seas. That Municipality may now sadly know that the Severity of Judgment, long delayed, is always exemplary. That the Innocent suffer with the Guilty, though much to be regretted, is the natural Feature of War; and the more terrible Infliction on this occasion, the more striking the Example should prove to surrounding Municipalities.

(Signed) W. RICKETTS

From September 1800 to June 1801, Pygmy, alone or with Corso, captured several small vessels, some of them armed:

- French trabaccolo privateer Bataglia di Marengo, while on a cruise from Ravenna (6 September);
- Imperial trabaccalo Divine Providence, sailing from Cesenatriro to France with a cargo of rope (17 September);
- Neapolitan polacca brig Madona de Laura, sailing from Trepano to Ponto Gai with a cargo of salt (20 September);
- Imperial trabaccolo Divine Providence, sailing from Monopoli to Milan with a cargo of oil (6 October);
- Cisalpine trabaccolo sailing from Ravenna to Pesaro with a cargo of oil (16 November, with Corso);
- Imperial ship Seinge, sailing from Barcelona to Trieste with a cargo of brandy (17 January 1801, with Corso); (Note: Seinge is probably Strange, which Corso captured that day.)
- Russian polacca ship Madona Turgliana, sailing from the Morea to Trieste with a cargo of leather (17 January, with Corso);
- Danish ship Adonis, detained while sailing from Copenhagen to Trieste with a cargo of stockfish (13 February, with Corso);
- Danish brig Madellina Christiana, detained while sailing from Venice to Zante with a cargo of planks (16 February, with Corso);
- French trabaccolo Adélaïde (see below);
- Imperial trabaccolo Madona del Anunciade, sailing from Trieste to Fiume with a cargo of hemp (27 February, with Corso);
- French trabaccolo privateer Achille (15 March, see below, with Corso); and
- French brig Prudente, of two guns and 36 men, sailing from Toulon to Alexandria, with a cargo of ammunition, artificers' tools, and "Comedians" (8 June).(Apparently Prudente had some 100 passengers aboard, including troops, and actual comedians.)

The deputies of the Mercantile Insurance Company in Trieste presented Shepheard with a golden snuffbox on 5 January as an expression of their appreciation for his efforts in suppressing "piratical enemies" in the upper Adriatic.

On 18 February 1801, Pigmy captured the French privateer Adélaïde. Adélaïde had been a fishing trabaccolo before her conversion to privateer. She was armed with one 6-pounder and two 12-pounder guns, and had a crew of 51 men under the command of Dominique Cannilla. She was seven days out of Ancona and had taken one small prize. On 26 February Pigmy captured Madona Turliana.

Then on the morning of 16 March Pigmy was on the north side of "Isle Lonzo'" when she sighted and gave chase to another trabaccolo. About two hours later this vessel anchored near the "Isle Molata", hoisted French colours, fired one shot, and then struck. She proved to be the privateer Achille, of four 9-pounder and two brass 6-pounder guns. She had a crew of 44 men and was one day out of Ancona. She had not taken any prizes.

On 17 April Corso and Pigmy captured St Luigi.

Pigmy was among the many vessels that shared in the proceeds of the capture on 9 June of Felicité and Josephine off Alexandria.

The next day, Pigmy spoke with Swiftsure and warned Captain Benjamin Hallowell that a French squadron under Admiral Ganteaume had put to sea. Swiftsure and the French encountered each other on 24 June, with the result that Swiftsure was forced to strike.

Because Pigmy served in the navy's Egyptian campaign between 8 March and 2 September, her officers and crew qualified for the clasp "Egypt" to the Naval General Service Medal that the Admiralty authorised in 1850 for all surviving claimants.

On 18 September, Pigmy captured the Ottoman polacca St Michele. Pigmy shared with Pomone, Vincejo, and the privateer Furioso in the proceeds of the capture on 2 October of Bella Aurora.

Shepheard commanded Pigmy until January 1803. He then transferred to take command of Basilisk. His replacement was Lieutenant Martin White, who sailed Pigmy on the Guernsey station. White resigned his command of Pigmy in consequence of ill health, but in March 1804, White transferred to Queen. His replacement on Pygmy was Lieutenant Samuel Burgess. Lieutenant William Smith replaced Burgess in 1805.

== Fate ==
On 10 August 1805 Pigmy was wrecked in Saint Aubin, Jersey, but without loss of life. She was about an hour into her departure to start a cruise when she hit a rock. She was stuck on the rock and repeated attempts to free her were unsuccessful. As the tide ebbed yards were deployed to prevent her healing over, and anchors too with the intent of kedging her off once the tide returned. At the same time boats from other vessels came and took off her stores, guns, and ammunition. Lastly, her crew cut away her masts. As the tide returned it still proved impossible to free her and she started filling with water. Boats took off her crew and by 4pm she had disappeared beneath the water.

The court martial of Smith, his officers, and crew took place in Portsmouth ten days later. The court martial board reprimanded the pilot, but honourably acquitted Smith, his officers, and crew.
