= HMS Minerva (1805) =

Frigate of the Royal Navy

- HMS Minerva off Finisterre Bay, 22 June 1806

History

United Kingdom
- Name: HMS Minerva
- Ordered: 12 July 1804
- Builder: Deptford Dockyard
- Cost: £15,017
- Laid down: August 1804
- Launched: 25 October 1805
- Commissioned: November 1805
- Fate: Broken up February 1815

General characteristics
- Class & type: 32-gun fifth rate Thames-class frigate
- Tons burthen: 659 bm
- Length: 127 ft (39 m) (overall); 107 ft (33 m) (keel)
- Beam: 34 ft 0.5 in (10.376 m)
- Depth of hold: 11 ft 3.5 in (3.442 m)
- Complement: 220
- Armament: Upper deck: 26 × 12-pounder guns; QD: 8 × 24-pounder carronades; Fc: 4 × 24-pounder carronades

HMS Minerva was a 32-gun fifth-rate Thames-class frigate of the Royal Navy, launched in 1805 at Deptford. Her namesake was the Roman goddess Minerva.

A wartime lack of building materials meant that Minerva and her class were built to the outdated 50-year-old design of the Richmond class, and were thus smaller than many contemporary frigates.

== Service history ==
From February 1806 Minerva served under Captain George Collier in the English Channel. On 27 April she took the 14-gun Spanish privateer La Finisterre with HMS Conflict. Minerva then took part in a number of small-boat operations on the coast, including taking an 8-gun fort and cutting out 5 Spanish coasters on 22 June. For this action her First Lieutenant, William Mulcaster, received a sword of £50 value from Lloyd's Patriotic Fund. On 11 July of the same year, her barge successfully took the 1-gun lugger La Buena Dicha after a chase of nearly 40 miles around Guarda.

On 29 October while reconnoitering the approaches to Pontevedra, Minerva cut out 2 chasse marées from Porto Novo, and 2 days later her barge took a Spanish lugger which had sailed from Avilés. Staying active, Captain Collier led the ship's cutter and barge to take a 24-pounder gun-boat and 30 men on 2 October, still in the vicinity of Pontevedra.

Alongside HMS Amazon she recaptured the schooner Jackdaw off the Cape Verde islands on 17 February 1807; Jackdaw had been captured only the day before. In October 1807 Minerva was serving alongside HMS Naiad and HMS Phoenix, sharing in Naiad's prize of the ship Vigilante. By the end of the year Captain Richard Hawkins had assumed command. On 17–18 March 1808, Minerva captured the Spanish ships La Purissima Consecion, La Caroline, and a lugger.

Minerva continued serving off the Spanish and French coasts, taking the 8-gun privateer La Joséphine on 23 September 1808. La Joséphine overset in a gale as she was captured, and Minerva was only able to save 16 of the 50-man crew. In October 1808 she took the 14-gun L'Améthyste and on 14 April 1809 the Danish brig Edward. By August 1809 Minerva was serving off Ushant and took the Carl Ludwig alongside HMS Dreadnought, HMS Gibraltar, HMS Tonnant, and HMS Snapper on 2 August. She took another ship, the chasse marée Le Bienfaisant, on 10 August. Minerva continued this run of successful captures into October, taking the French ships L'Emerance and L'Emulation on 3 and 12 October respectively and the chasse marée La Victoire 8 days later.

By 3 December 1810 Minerva was part of the joint expedition of Vice-Admiral Sir Albemarle Bertie and Major-General John Abercrombie which successfully captured Isle de France. On 28 December she detained the ship Mary while in company with HMS Royal Oak and HMS Valiant. She sailed for Newfoundland on 6 May 1811, participating in convoy duties from North America to the West Indies between 1812 and 1813.

=== French frigate L'Artimise ===
On 18 August 1808, Minerva possibly destroyed the French 40-gun frigate L'Artimise near Brest. The London Gazette shows that head money was paid to the crew on 5 March 1811, while chroniclers in 1828 describe elements of the Brest blockading squadron chasing her ashore. However, there is no concrete evidence of such a ship existing on the French establishment. The previous Artémise was destroyed at the Battle of the Nile in 1787. William O'Byrne suggests it was a new ship that Charles Dashwood fought in 1801, however, William James could find no evidence of the existence of a L'Artémise apart from Dashwood's engagement and her reported destruction by Minerva in 1808. Thus, while it is assured that Minerva destroyed a ship by running it ashore on 18 August 1808, the identity of that ship is unknown.

== Fate ==
In 1814 Minerva was put in ordinary at Sheerness and was broken up there in February 1815.
