= Maidstone-class frigate =

Frigate class of the Royal Navy

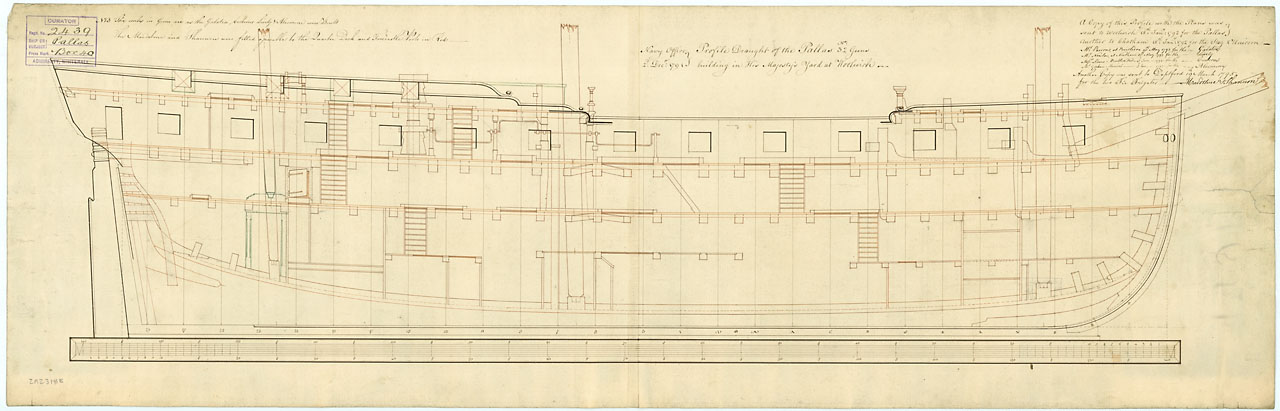
- Design of the Maidstone and Alcmene classes

Class overview
- Name: Maidstone-class frigate
- Builders: Deptford Dockyard
- Operators: Royal Navy
- Preceded by: Hermione class
- Succeeded by: Thames class
- Cost: Maidstone £25,108; Shannon £22,498
- Built: 1795–1796
- In commission: 1796–1804
- Planned: 2
- Completed: 2

General characteristics
- Type: Fifth-rate frigate
- Tons burthen: 796 17/94 (bm)
- Length: 135 ft (41.1 m) (gundeck); 112 ft 4 1/4 in (34.2 m) (keel)
- Beam: 36 ft 6 in (11.1 m)
- Depth of hold: 12 ft 6 in (3.8 m)
- Propulsion: Sails
- Complement: 240
- Armament: Gundeck: 26 × 12-pounder guns; QD: 4 × 6-pounder guns + 4 × 24-pounder carronades; Fc: 2 × 6-pounder guns + 2 × 24-pounder carronades

The Maidstone-class frigate was a 32-gun fifth-rate frigate class of two ships designed by Sir John Henslow and ordered on 4 February 1795. The class was a close copy of Henslow's earlier Alcmene class, but was constructed of pitch pine instead of oak. With concerns over whether the lighter building material would safely hold an armament of 18-pounder long guns, the class was instead armed with smaller 12-pounders. Both ships of the class served through the French Revolutionary Wars, but neither had a long career. Shannon was sold at Sheerness Dockyard in May 1802 and Maidstone was placed in ordinary at Chatham Dockyard in 1804 before being broken up in 1810.

== Design ==
The Maidstone class of two 32-gun fifth-rate frigates was built in 1795 during the French Revolutionary Wars for the Royal Navy. They copied the pattern of the Alcmene class, which had been designed by the Surveyor of the Navy, Sir John Henslow, two years earlier. This class was in turn an improved version of Henslow's 1790 design of the Pallas-class frigate, his first for a 32-gun vessel. The class is sometimes considered to be a modified version of the Alcmene class rather than a separate one. While the Alcmene class was built of oak, the Maidstone class used pitch pine. Pitch pine-built ships were lighter than their oak counterparts and thus required more ballast and rolled more at sea. This made the handling of heavy weaponry like 18-pounder long guns more dangerous.

The Admiralty questioned whether pitch pine ships should be equipped with heavy armaments because of this, worrying about the structural integrity of the ships. The Maidstone class had been planned to hold 18-pounders, but because of these fears the armament was changed to smaller 12-pounder long guns. The naval historian Robert Gardiner notes that other ships built of pitch pine did not have their armament changed, and suggests that the relatively small size of the Maidstone-class ships also played a part in their rearmament.

The Admiralty considered such 12-pounder frigates obsolete, and the Maidstone class, along with the unique frigate HMS Triton, was the last class to be built with 12-pounders until the start of the Napoleonic Wars. As well as this, the Maidstone class differed to the Alcmene class in several ways. These included the addition of solid barricades on the quarterdeck, providing protection on the broadside for the guns placed there, and a square (rather than rounded) stern.

The class was moderately fast, ranging from 9 knots (10 mph) to 12 knots (14 mph) depending on the weather, and was especially well-handled in strong winds. The sides of the ships were relatively high for 12-pounder frigates, as they had been designed for larger 18-pounders, and this provided the ships with "unprecedented freeboard" according to Gardiner. (Note: Reports from the performance of Shannon on 25 April 1802.)

== Construction ==
Construction of the class was authorised on 4 February 1795 and the contract for both ships was awarded to Deptford Dockyard, where they were built by the shipwright Martin Ware until June and subsequently by Thomas Pollard. The two ships of the class were named Maidstone and Shannon on 28 August and constructed to the following dimensions: 135 ft (41.1 m) along the gun deck, 112 ft 4 1/4 in (34.2 m) at the keel, with a beam of 36 ft 6 in (11.1 m) and a depth in the hold of 12 ft 6 in (3.8 m). They measured 79617/94 tons burthen.

The finalised armament of the class was twenty-six smoothbore 12-pounders on the gundeck, four 6-pounders and four 24-pound carronades on the quarterdeck, and two 6-pounders and two 24-pound carronades on the forecastle. Shannon's armament stayed the same throughout her service, while in about 1808 Maidstone had her 6-pounders replaced by 24-pound carronades. Maidstone cost £25,108 to construct and fit out, with Shannon slightly less expensive at £22,498.

== Ships ==
Ship name	Builder	Ordered	Laid down	Launched	Commissioned	Fate	Ref.
Maidstone	Deptford Dockyard	4 February 1795	March 1795	12 December 1795	January 1796	Broken up at Chatham Dockyard 1810	
Shannon	Deptford Dockyard	4 February 1795	April 1795	9 February 1796	February 1796	Sold at Sheerness Dockyard May 1802	

=== Maidstone ===
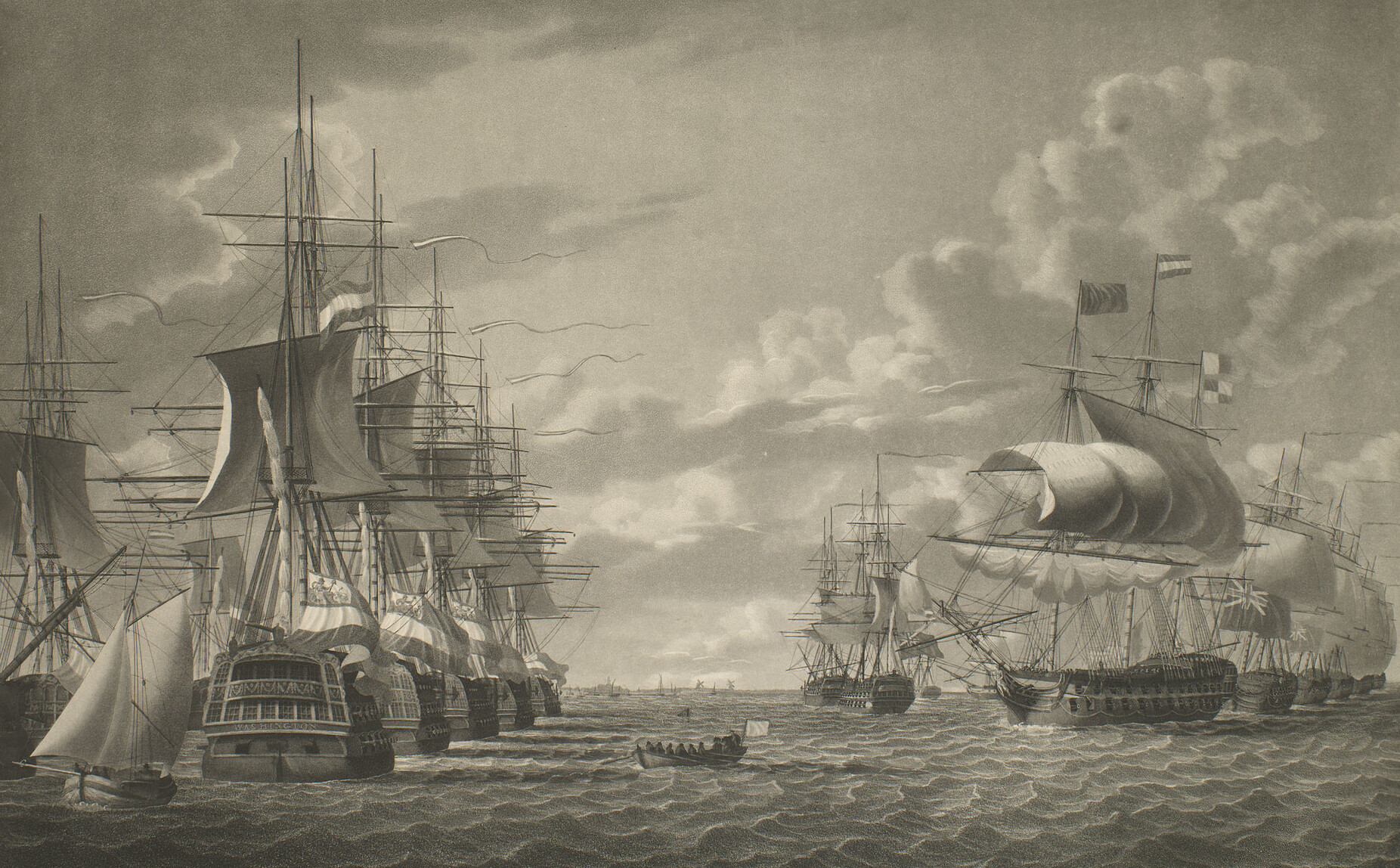
Shannon participated in the Vlieter incident in August 1799

Maidstone, named after the Battle of Maidstone, was commissioned by Captain John Mathews in January 1796 for the Leeward Islands Station, where she took the French 12-gun privateer Flibuster on 24 June 1797. Upon the death of Mathews, Captain Ross Donnelly assumed command, serving at Jamaica, Halifax, and finally in the English Channel in 1801.

Under Captain Richard Hussey Moubray Maidstone then sailed for the Mediterranean Sea in 1802, taking the French 8-gun ship Arabe there on 14 June the following year. With Captain George Elliott in command, Maidstone then served at the blockade of Toulon, taking part in the destruction of a number of ships off Le Lavandou with her boats on 11 July 1804. Maidstone was laid up in ordinary at Chatham Dockyard in December of the same year, and was broken up there in 1810.

=== Shannon ===
Shannon, named after the River Shannon, was commissioned by Captain Alexander Fraser in February 1796 for the Irish Station. While on station she took several French ships, including the 16-gun privateer Mouche on 5 December 1797, 24-gun privateer Duguay Trouin on 2 February 1798, 18-gun privateer Julie on 23 June, and 20-gun privateer Grand Milieu on 15 January 1799. In April command of Shannon changed to Captain Charles Pater, under whom she participated in the Vlieter incident, part of the Anglo-Russian Invasion of Holland, in August. Captain Jonas Rose assumed command in 1801, continuing in the Baltic Sea, before Shannon was sold at Sheerness Dockyard in May 1802.
