= HMS Vulture (1803) =

UK merchant ship and naval sloop 1803–1820

History

United Kingdom
- Name: Warrior
- Builder: Simon Temple, South Shields
- Launched: 1801
- Fate: Sold 1803

United Kingdom
- Name: HMS Vulture
- Acquired: 1803 by purchase
- Fate: Sold 1814

United Kingdom
- Name: Warrior
- Acquired: 1814 by purchase
- Fate: Last listed 1820

General characteristics
- Tons burthen: 389, or 391, or 392, (bm)
- Length: Overall:105 ft 0 in (32.0 m); Keel:81 ft 11 in (25.0 m)
- Beam: 29 ft 11 1/2 in (9.1 m)
- Depth of hold: 12 ft 9 1/2 in (3.9 m)
- Sail plan: Sloop
- Complement: 100
- Armament: Upper deck:14 × 24-pounder + 2 × 12-pounder carronades; Fc:2 × 6-pounder guns

HMS Vulture was launched in 1801 at South Shields as Warrior. The Royal Navy purchased her in 1803 as a sloop and renamed her. From 1808 through 1813 she was a floating battery at Jersey,. The Navy sold her in 1814 and she returned to mercantile service as Warrior. She was last listed in 1820, but does not seem to have sailed again after returning from east of the Cape in 1817.

== Warrior ==
The Register of Shipping (RS) for 1802 showed Warrior with B. Trotter, master, S. Temple, owner, and trade Newcastle–London. The entry was unchanged in the 1804 volume.

== HMS Vulture ==
The Admiralty purchased Warrior in June 1803 and renamed her Vulture. She underwent fitting at Deptford between 20 July and 29 September. Commander William Green commissioned her in August for the North Sea.

Vulture was part of a squadron under the command of Captain Robert Honyman in HMS Leda. Early in the morning of 24 April 1805 the squadron sighted twenty-six French vessels rounding Cap Gris Nez. Honyman immediately ordered several of his squadron to intercept. After a fight of about two hours, Starling and Locust had captured seven armed schuyts in an action within pistol-shot of the shore batteries on Cap Gris Nez. The next day Archer brought in two more schuyts. As part of the squadron, Vulture shared in the prize money.

Vulture underwent further fitting at Sheerness between November 1806 and August 1807. Commander Joseph (or Joneson) Pearce commissioned her in December.

Vulture and the sloop Falcon shared in the capture on 28 August 1807 of the Danish ship Martha for which prize money was awarded nearly four years later.

On 11 November 1807 Vulture was in company or in sight when HMS Aimable captured the French 16-privateer Décidée.

Between December 1807 and February 1808 Vulture underwent fitting at Sheerness for service as a floating battery. In October Commander Martin White took command of her. Vulture served at Jersey.

Late in 1811 Commander George Morris replaced White. Then from February 1812 into 1813 Vulture's commander was Commander Henry Baugh. On 6 December 1813 Vulture seized the brig Pax, at Jersey. Pax was flying Danish colours.

Disposal: on 29 September 1814 the "Principal Officers and Commissioners of His Majesty's Navy" offered for sale "Vulture, of 391 tons", "Lying at Deptford". She sold on 30 September for £1,500.

== Warrior ==
Warrior appeared in Lloyd's Register in 1815 with C.H. Watson, master, changing to Peachy, M. Boyd. owner, and trade London–Tobago, changing to London–Cape of Good Hope (CGH, or the Cape). The same issue gave her origins as Whitby, in 1803. Warrior had acquired Whitby registry. (Note: Hackman accepted this information from LR. By contrast, RS carried the correct origin, Shields, and the correct year, 1801.)

In 1813 the EIC lost its monopoly on the trade between India and Britain. British ships were then free to sail to India or the Indian Ocean under a license from the EIC.

On 26 November 1815, Warrior, Peche, master, arrived at Gravesend from the Cape. On 30 November she was at Deal, preparing to sail to the Cape.

On 7 December 1815 Vulture, D. Peche, master, Boyd, owner, sailed for Bombay under a license from the EIC. On 10 March 1816 she was at the Cape, on her way to Île de France (Mauritius). She sailed on 14 April and arrived there on 10 July.

On 15 May 1817 she was at the Cape of Good Hope, returning from Mauritius. On 27 September she arrived at Portsmouth. She had left Île de France around 12 April and the Cape on 9 July.

== Fate ==
Warrior was last listed in 1820.
