= Martin White (Royal Navy officer) =

British admiral

Admiral Martin White
- Born: 1779 (or 1781 (Note: A copy of a Baptismal certificate from mentions 1781)); Hayling Island, Hampshire, England
- Died: 30 June 1865
- Allegiance: Great Britain; United Kingdom; British Empire
- Branch: Royal Navy
- Service years: 1793-1846
- Rank: Admiral
- Commands: HMS Pigmy; Sandwich (hired armed lugger); HMS Manly; HMS Jackdaw; HMS Weymouth; HMS Vulture; HMS Shamrock
- Conflicts: Napoleonic Wars
- Spouse: Eleanor Egan

Admiral Martin White was an officer of the Royal Navy. He worked his way up the ranks during a 53-year career; retiring as captain and made up to Admiral in retirement and settling in Jersey. He was particularly known for gathering and publishing nautical data and mappings of the Channel Islands, English Channel, French Coast, Bristol Channel and Irish Sea and even gained a mention in the French Maritime Atlas of the 1800s.

Most maritime charts from around Jersey and the Channel Islands are believed to be derivations of his work.

== Life ==
Martin White was born in 1779 (one document says 1781) on Hayling Island, Hampshire, England to his parents Martin and Elizabeth White. His father was a wine-merchant of Postsea, Portsmouth.

=== Early naval service ===
White joined the navy in 1793 at Portsmouth aged about 15 years. In 1794 White he assigned as a midshipman on the 74 gun third-rate Alexander under Richard Rodney Bligh. Canada and Alexander were returning from escort duty when they encountered a French squadron under Joseph-Marie Nielly consisting of five 74-gun ships of the line, three frigates, and a brig. Bligh fought desperate a solo rearguard action that allowed the Canada to escape. The sinking Alexander took 40 casualties and White and his crew-mates were taken prisoner at Brest. Having gained his freedom White was appointed in 1796 to Topaze, which successfully engaged and captured the 36-gun French frigate Elizabeth. White left Topaze by 1800 having made the grade of Master's Mate.

On 12 December 1800 White was promoted to Lieutenant following a written examination. The Navy first assigned him to Pylades. White is known to have performed surveys on Pigmy while blockading the ports of Le Havre, St Malo, and Granville. Ill-health forced him to leave the Pygmy in 1804.

In 1805 he assumed command of Manly. However, she ran aground on the River Ems on the eastern border of East Frisia in January 1806 due poor navigation by the pilot. There the Dutch were able to seize her.

A little blame attached to White but in June 1806 he commissioned the schooner Jackdaw. Then in September 1806 he was promoted to Commander and assigned to command of the store ship Weymouth.

=== Jersey ===
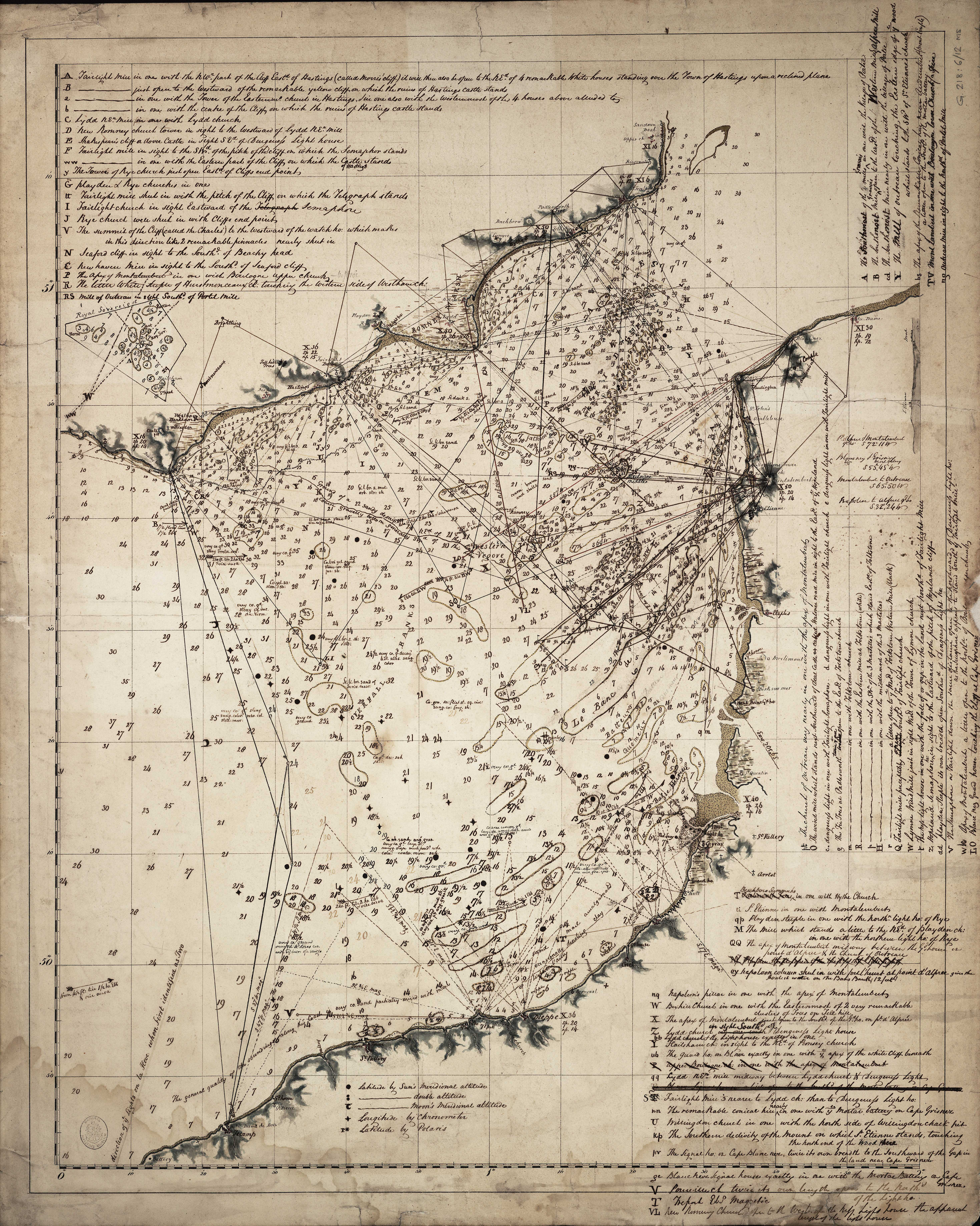
English Channel, from the meridian east to the Downs

From September 1808 he was assigned for three years to Vulture, a guard ship stationed at Jersey. It seems he took every opportunity while on Vulture for hydrology and survey work both around the Channel Islands and around the French coast. This was not without danger in the period of the Napoleonic Wars. Captain Thomas Hurd had been appointed Admiralty's Hydrographer earlier in 1808. If Hurd was not influential in White's appointment to Vulture he would certainly have supported the survey work. In the end White was to set roots in Jersey for the rest of his life, marrying Eleanor Egan on 24 August 1811 and setting up home in St. Helier.

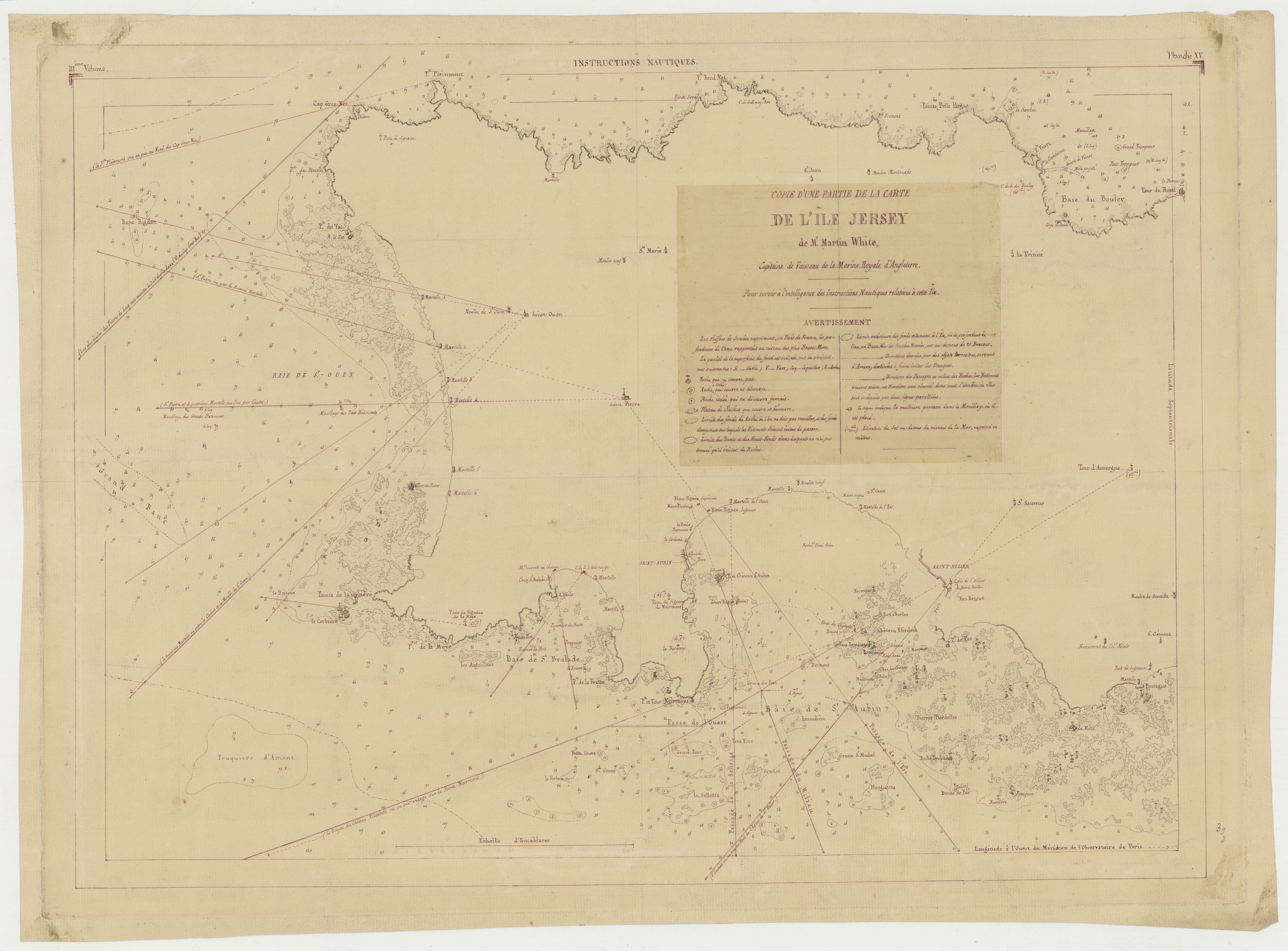
Copy of part of the map of Jersey Island - from Mr Martin White, Captain of the Royal Navy of England

White was unemployed for a short while in 1812, before later in that year being assigned the 16-ton vessel Fox (Note: While the date are matching this cannot be the 700t HMS Fox (1780) broken up in 1816.) for survey work around Jersey. Given the larger vessel Shamrock in 1817; in 1818 he was promoted to post-captain. His surveys over the ensuing years to 1828 included the English, Bristol, and Irish channels.

In 1821 Captain White co-authored with John Walker A survey of the island of Jersey, and its surrounding dangers. It is noted it was able to be published due to the work of Captain Thomas Hurd (1747–1823) enabling publication of such works to the mercantile fleet. Captain white subsequently updated the work in 1840 and 1861. In 1824 he further published maps and chart of other Channel Island locations and two maps of the coast or Ireland. In 1834/5 he also published Sailing directions for the English Channel: including a general description of the South Coasts of England and Ireland and a Detailed Account of the Channel Islands which was published with revisited editions up until 1850.

Captain White worked with Charles-François Beautemps-Beaupré mapping the coast of France and is mentioned in the French Maritime Atlas.

It is believed he was probably responsible for naming the deep underwater valley in the English Channel Hurd Deep after Hurd.

=== Retirement ===
Around his retirement from naval service in 1846 he authored the work Remarks on the winds, tides, and currents of the ocean : with other phenomena. His promotion to Admiral may post retirement may have been for the purposes of increasing his pension, though when he died in 1865 three years after his wife he left a relatively small personal estate of £200. His daughter Ellen Elisabeth, who had acted as secretary for him without remuneration, and remained a spinster, came into financial difficulties and was helped by Sir John Le Couteur arranging an annuity from the Royal Naval Annuitant Society.

== Bibliography ==
- Sailing directions for the English Channel: including a general description of the South Coasts of England and Ireland and a Detailed Account of the Channel Islands (2 ed.). London: Hydrographic Office, Admiralty. 1835. OCLC 656744962.
