= HMS Jackdaw (1806) =

History

United Kingdom
- Name: HMS Jackdaw
- Ordered: 11 December 1805
- Builder: William Rowe, St Peter's Yard, Newcastle
- Laid down: January 1806
- Launched: 19 May 1806
- Fate: Sold 1 November 1816

General characteristics
- Class & type: Cuckoo-class schooner
- Tons burthen: 7586/94 (bm)
- Length: 56 ft 2 1/2 in (17.1 m) (overall); 42 ft 10 1/4 in (13.1 m) (keel)
- Beam: 18 ft 1 1/2 in (5.5 m)
- Draught: Unladen: 4 ft 3 in (1.3 m); Laden: 7 ft 10 in (2.4 m)
- Depth of hold: 8 ft 1 1/2 in (2.5 m)
- Sail plan: Schooner
- Complement: 20
- Armament: 4 × 12-pounder carronades

HMS Jackdaw was a Royal Navy Cuckoo-class schooner that William Rowe built at Newcastle and launched in 1806. She had a relatively undistinguished career, with the low point being her capture by what some described as a Spanish "rowboat". British frigates recaptured Jackdaw the next day. She went on to serve as a tender at Plymouth before being sold in 1816.

== Service ==
In June 1806 Lieutenant Martin White commissioned her before turning over command to Lieutenant Samuel Thomas. The newly promoted Lieutenant Nathaniel Brice took command in October.

Jackdaw was carrying letters from Admiral Collingwood to England on a course along the Portuguese coast. On 15 February 1807 she spotted three sails, which altered their course towards her. A chase developed but next morning the largest of the three, a lateen-rigged vessel, was observed to be only five miles behind and using sweeps to catch up. Jackdaw fired a handful of shots before the vessel took up a raking position on Jackdaw's quarter and hoisted a Spanish flag. Brice consulted with the Mate, John Edwards, and the two convinced each other that as they had only two guns mounted, and a total of only 17 men on board, resistance was futile. They therefore struck.

After they were taken prisoner, some crew members became drunk and abusive, which led Brice later to charge them with drunken insubordination. Two testified at the subsequent court martial on 11 May 1807 for the loss of Jackdaw that Brice and Edwards had surrendered too easily. The court martial board agreed and dismissed both Brice and Edwards from the service. The crewmen were sentenced to be mulcted of any pay due.

The next day the frigates Minerva and Amazon recaptured Jackdaw. Later, the Admiralty reinstated Brice and he went on to serve on several vessels until 1815. (Note: He did not serve after 1815 but in 1840 he was placed on the list of retired Commanders.)

== Fate ==
In July 1810 Jackdaw was fitted as a tender to the flagship at Plymouth. She was offered for sale on 17 October 1816, and sold on 1 November for £210.
