= Murdoch McKenzie (Royal Navy officer) =

British Royal Navy commander and hydrographer

- Born: 1743
- Died: 27 January 1829 (aged 85–86)
- Occupations: Royal Navy commander and hydrographer

Murdoch McKenzie (1743 – 27 January 1829) was a British Royal Navy commander and hydrographer.

== Biography ==
McKenzie was born in 1743, was the nephew of Murdoch McKenzie the elder. He is said to have been a midshipman of the Dolphin in her voyage round the world under Commodore John Byron, 1764–6. In 1771 he succeeded his uncle as surveyor of the admiralty. In 1773 he was surveying the coast of Cornwall, in 1775 the coast of Kent, in 1779 the south coast of Devon. On 5 August 1779 he was promoted to the rank of lieutenant in the navy, but the promotion made no difference in his work. In 1780 he surveyed the channel between the Isle of Sheppey and the mainland, an idea having been started that the Dutch might attempt to get again into the Medway by this passage. In 1781 he surveyed the Needles, at the request of the Trinity House, in order to determine the best way of protecting vessels from the rocks. About this time his eyesight began to fail, but he continued to act as chief surveyor of the admiralty till 1788. His charts were not published till 1804, and it does not appear that he had anything to do with that stage of the work. He was promoted to be commander on 31 January' 1814, and died on 27 January 1829, in his eighty-sixth year (Gent. Mag. 1829 pt. i. p. 188). He is described as of Minehead in Somerset. The confusion between the two hydrographers of the same name is almost inextricable, and the 'Treatise on Marine Surveying' is commonly attributed to the nephew.
