= List of shipwrecks in 1810 =

The list of shipwrecks in 1810 includes ships sunk, wrecked or otherwise lost during 1810.

table of contents
1810
Jan	Feb	Mar	Apr
May	Jun	Jul	Aug
Sep	Oct	Nov	Dec
Unknown date

== January ==
=== 3 January ===
List of shipwrecks: 3 January 1810
Ship	State	Description
Diligente	Portugal	The brig was abandoned in the Atlantic Ocean. Her crew were rescued by Alexander (United States). Diligente was on a voyage from Pernambuco, Brazil to Porto.

=== 4 January ===
List of shipwrecks: 4 January 1810
Ship	State	Description
Trial	United Kingdom	Napoleonic Wars: The ship was captured and burnt by the privateer Juno (France).

=== 5 January ===
List of shipwrecks: 5 January 1810
Ship	State	Description
Herald	United Kingdom	The ship was wrecked at Milford Haven, Pembrokeshire. She was on a voyage from Cork to Jamaica.
Unnamed	Denmark	The ship was abandoned in the Firth of Forth with the loss of a crew member.

=== 6 January ===
List of shipwrecks: 6 January 1810
Ship	State	Description
Father & Son	United Kingdom	The ship was lost at Malta.

=== 7 January ===
List of shipwrecks: 7 January 1810
Ship	State	Description
Zealous	United Kingdom	The transport ship departed from Great Yarmouth, Norfolk for Heligoland. No further trace and presumed foundered in the North Sea with the loss of all on board.

=== 8 January ===
List of shipwrecks: 8 January 1810
Ship	State	Description
Essex	United Kingdom	The ship ran aground on the Kish Bank, in the Irish Sea. She was on a voyage from "St. Salvadore" to Liverpool, Lancashire. She was refloated and put in to Dublin.

=== 10 January ===
List of shipwrecks: 10 January 1810
Ship	State	Description
Ann	United Kingdom	Napoleonic Wars: The ship was captured and burnt by a French privateer. She was on a voyage from Seville, Spain to London.
Dispatch	United Kingdom	The schooner was lost at Malta.
Indefatigable	United Kingdom	The ship was lost at Malta.
Royal African	United Kingdom	The transport ship was lost at Malta.

=== 11 January ===
List of shipwrecks: 11 January 1810
Ship	State	Description
Betsey	United Kingdom	The ship sprang a leak and was abandoned by her crew. She was on a voyage from Bristol, Gloucestershire to Chatham, Kent.
Orconoko	United Kingdom	The ship was lost near Port Patrick, Wigtownshire. She was on a voyage from Whitehaven, Cumberland to Dublin.

=== 12 January ===
List of shipwrecks: 12 January 1810
Ship	State	Description
George and Ann	United Kingdom	The ship ran aground and sank at Holyhead, Anglesey. She was on a voyage from Liverpool, Lancashire to Cork.
Mars	United Kingdom	The ship was lost near St. Andrews, New Brunswick, British North America. Her crew were rescued. She was on a voyage from St. Andrews to Bristol, Gloucestershire.
Richard	United Kingdom	The ship was driven ashore and wrecked near Margate, Kent. She was on a voyage from Rio de Janeiro, Viceroyalty of the Río de la Plata to London.
Sachem	United Kingdom	The ship foundered in the North Sea. She was on a voyage from Heligoland to Cowes, Isle of Wight.

=== 13 January ===
List of shipwrecks: 13 January 1810
Ship	State	Description
Cornwallis	United Kingdom	The ship was driven ashore in Tor Bay. She was later refloated and taken in to Brixham, Devon.
Friends	United Kingdom	The ship was driven ashore in Tor Bay. She was on a voyage from Teignmouth, Devon to Faial Island, Azores. Friends was later refloated and taken in to Brixham.
Hoop	Prussia	The ship was driven ashore at Great Yarmouth.
Pitt	United Kingdom	The ship was driven ashore at Herne Bay, Kent. She was on a voyage from Jamaica to London.
Vrow Maria	(France) First French Empire	The ship was driven ashore at Great Yarmouth.

=== 14 January ===
List of shipwrecks: 14 January 1810
Ship	State	Description
Vrow Gesina	Prussia	The ship was driven ashore near Blakeney, Norfolk, United Kingdom.

=== 15 January ===
List of shipwrecks: 15 January 1810
Ship	State	Description
Elizabeth Henrietta	(France) First French Empire	The hoy sprang a leak in the North Sea whilst on a voyage from Liverpool, Lancashire, United Kingdom to Rotterdam. She was beached at Kessingland, Suffolk, United Kingdom with the loss of her captain. Seven crew were rescued by rocket apparatus.
Hibernia	United Kingdom	The ship capsized in the Atlantic Ocean with the loss of three of the seven people on board. The survivors were rescued on 22 February at 43°20′N 65°30′W by Rolla (United Kingdom). Hibernia was on a voyage from Newfoundland, British North America to Liverpool, Lancashire.

=== 16 January ===
List of shipwrecks: 16 January 1810
Ship	State	Description
Zealous	United Kingdom	Gunboat War: The ship was driven ashore near Copenhagen, Denmark. She was subsequently refloated and taken in to Copenhagen as a prize. Zealous was on a voyage from Great Yarmouth, Norfolk to Heligoland.

=== 17 January ===
List of shipwrecks: 17 January 1810
Ship	State	Description
Griffin	United Kingdom	The ship foundered in the North Sea off Flamborough Head, East Riding of Yorkshire. Her crew were rescued.

=== 19 January ===
List of shipwrecks: 19 January 1810
Ship	State	Description
Grand Duke	United Kingdom	The ship departed from Jamaica for London. No further trace, presumed foundered with the loss of all hands.
Hibernia	United Kingdom	The ship capsized in the Atlantic Ocean with the loss of all but four of her crew. She was on a voyage from New Brunswick, British North America to Liverpool, Lancashire.
Yarmouth	United States	The schooner was wrecked on the Sable Island, Nova Scotia, British North America. She was on a voyage from Boston, Massachusetts, to Gothenburg, Sweden.

=== 20 January ===
List of shipwrecks: 20 January 1810
Ship	State	Description
Hope	United Kingdom	The ship was driven ashore at Vollerwiek, Duchy of Schleswig.
John Watson	United Kingdom	The ship was driven ashore at Vollerwiek.
Jonge Johan	(Denmark) Duchy of Schleswig	The ship was driven ashore at Vollerwiek.
Rebecca	United Kingdom	The ship was driven ashore at Vollerwiek.
Richmond	United Kingdom	The ship was driven ashore at Vollerwiek.
Thomas	United Kingdom	The ship was driven ashore at Vollerwiek.

=== 21 January ===
List of shipwrecks: 21 January 1810
Ship	State	Description
Defiance	United Kingdom	The ship foundered in the Atlantic Ocean. Her crew were rescued. She was on a voyage from New York, United States to London.
Martin	United Kingdom	The ship struck the pier at Great Yarmouth, Norfolk and sank. Her crew were rescued.
Nevis Planter	United Kingdom	Napoleonic Wars: The ship was captured and burnt by Astrée (French Navy). She was on a voyage from Liverpool, Lancashire to St. Croix, Virgin Islands.

=== 22 January ===
List of shipwrecks: 22 January 1810
Ship	State	Description
Brothers	United Kingdom	The ship was driven ashore at Whitby, Yorkshire. Her crew were rescued. She was on a voyage from Sunderland, County Durham to London. Brothers was later refloated and taken in to Whitby for repairs.

=== 23 January ===
List of shipwrecks: 23 January 1810
Ship	State	Description
Havannah	Spain	The ship foundered in the Atlantic Ocean. Her crew were rescued. She was on a voyage from Amelia Island, East Florida, New Spain to Liverpool, Lancashire, United Kingdom.
John	(United Kingdom of Great Britain and Ireland) Jamaica	Napoleonic Wars: The sloop was captured and sunk off Port Royal by the privateer Supérieure (France).

=== 24 January ===
List of shipwrecks: 24 January 1810
Ship	State	Description
Enegheten	Flag unknown	The ship was driven ashore near Lochmaddy, North Uist, Outer Hebrides, United Kingdom. She was on a voyage from Hull, Yorkshire, United Kingdom to Liverpool, Lancashire, United Kingdom.

=== 25 January ===
List of shipwrecks: 25 January 1810
Ship	State	Description
Rosindale	United Kingdom	The ship departed from Bahia, Brazil for Liverpool, Lancashire. No further trace and presumed foundered in the Atlantic Ocean with the loss of all hands.

=== 26 January ===
List of shipwrecks: 26 January 1810
Ship	State	Description
Betsey	United Kingdom	The ship departed from Saint Thomas, Virgin Islands for Lancaster, Lancashire. No further trace, presumed foundered with the loss of all hands.

=== 27 January ===
List of shipwrecks: 27 January 1810
Ship	State	Description
Britannia	United Kingdom	Napoleonic Wars: The ship was captured and burnt by a French privateer. She was on a voyage from Gibraltar to Falmouth, Cornwall.
Perseus	United Kingdom	The ship was wrecked on Samson, Isles of Scilly while en route from Martinique to London with a cargo of sugar, which was salvaged and sold on nearby St Mary's.

=== 28 January ===
List of shipwrecks: 28 January 1810
Ship	State	Description
Howe	United Kingdom	The ship was wrecked on the Haisborough Sands, in the North Sea off the coast of Norfolk. Her crew were rescued. She was on a voyage from London to Newcastle upon Tyne, Northumberland.

=== 30 January ===
List of shipwrecks: 30 January 1810
Ship	State	Description
Delight	United Kingdom	The ship was wrecked on the Scarweather Sands, in the Bristol Channel. Her four crew were rescued. She was on a voyage from Bridgwater, Somerset to Neath, Glamorgan.
Lottery	United Kingdom	The ship was lost in Dundrum Bay. Her crew were rescued. She was on a voyage from Liverpool, Lancashire to the Bahamas.
Venus	United States	The ship was wrecked on North Uist, Orkney Islands, United Kingdom with some loss of life.

=== Unknown date ===
List of shipwrecks: Unknown date in January 1810
Ship	State	Description
Ann	United Kingdom	The ship was wrecked on the coast of Jutland. She was on a voyage from Gothenburg, Sweden to Leith, Lothian.
Apollo	Russia	The ship was lost near Åbo, Grand Duchy of Finland.
Apparancen	Sweden	The ship was driven ashore near Westerwick, Orkney Islands, United Kingdom. She was on a voyage from London, United Kingdom to Stockholm.
Arch Duke Charles	United Kingdom	The transport ship was wrecked at Vlissingen, Zeeland First French Empire.
Ariadne	United States	The ship foundered in the Jade Bight.
Bon Aventure	United Kingdom	The ship was abandoned in the Atlantic Ocean before 10 January. She was on a voyage from Seville, Spain to London.
Britannia	United Kingdom	The ship was driven ashore in Loch Ardwell. She was on a voyage from Liverpool to Ballantrae, Ayrshire.
Commerce	United Kingdom	The ship ran aground on the Hoyle Bank, in Liverpool Bay. She was on a voyage from Liverpool, Lancashire to Africa. Commerce was later refloated and taken in to Liverpool.
Creon	United Kingdom	The brig either capsized or was run down in the North Sea about 10 leagues (30 nautical miles (56 km)) off Huntly, Aberdeenshire.
Dove	United Kingdom	The ship foundered in the Irish Sea off the Isle of Man with the loss of all hands.
Drie Gebroeders	Flag unknown	The ship was run down and sunk in the North Sea off Great Yarmouth, Norfolk, United Kingdom by HMS Zenobia (Royal Navy).
Einigkeit	Sweden	The ship was lost near Varberg. She was on a voyage from Gothenburg to Colberg.
Eliza	United States	The brig ran aground on the Stony Binks, in the North Sea off the mouth of the River Humber. She was abandoned by her crew and was subsequently beached. Eliza was on a voyage from Gefle, Sweden to Portsmouth, Hampshire, United Kingdom.
Engelina	(France) First French Empire	The ship was driven ashore on Texel, North Holland.
Entururff	Danzig	The ship was lost in the Baltic Sea.
Erfahrung	Flag unknown	The ship was lost in the White Sea.
Expedition	United Kingdom	The ship foundered in the Baltic Sea.
Fortuna	Sweden	The ship was lost near Strömstad. She was on a voyage from London to Kalmar.
Frau Dorothea	Flag unknown	The ship was driven ashore at Marstrand, Sweden. She was on a voyage from London, United Kingdom to a Baltic port.
Frau Ellen	Flag unknown	The ship foundered in the North Sea off Lindisfarne, Northumberland, United Kingdom.
Harriet Garland	United Kingdom	The ship was wrecked on the Irish coast. She was on a voyage from Liverpool to Heligoland.
Heart of Oak	United Kingdom	The ship was driven ashore. She was on a voyage from Hull, Yorkshire to Heligoland. She was refloated and taken in to Scarborough, Yorkshire.
Jason	United Kingdom	The ship was lost near Dagerort, Russia.
Johannes	United Kingdom	The ship was driven ashore near Cádiz, Spain.
Jonge Agnetha	Prussia	The ship was lost near Emden.
Juliana	Flag unknown	The ship was driven ashore at Visby, Sweden.
Magnet	United Kingdom	The ship was driven ashore at Strangford, County Down. She was on a voyage from Newry, County Down to Liverpool.
Maria	Russia	The ship was lost in the White Sea.
Maria Jane	United Kingdom	The ship was lost in the White Sea.
Mary	United Kingdom	The ship was driven ashore in Bootle Bay. She was on a voyage from New York, United States to Liverpool.
Mary	United Kingdom	The ship was driven ashore at Margate, Kent. She was on a voyage from Cádiz, Spain to London.
Princess de Biera	Flag unknown	The ship foundered in the White Sea.
Resolution	United Kingdom	The ship was wrecked on the Scottish coast. Nine of her crew were rescued. She was on a voyage from Hull, East Riding of Yorkshire to Liverpool.
Severn	United Kingdom	The ship was driven ashore in Dundalk Bay. She was on a voyage from Newry to Liverpool. Severn was later refloated.
Shepherdess	United Kingdom	The ship was driven ashore and wrecked at Whitstable, Kent. She was on a voyage from Alicante, Spain to London.
St. Basillus	Russia	The ship was lost in the White Sea.
Swift	United Kingdom	The ship capsized at Ramsgate, Kent. She was on a voyage from London to Cork.
Victor	United Kingdom	The ship was driven ashore and wrecked near Uddevalla, Sweden. She was on a voyage from London to a Baltic port.
Vrouw Anna	Prussia	The ship was wrecked on the Swedish coast.
William	United Kingdom	The ship was driven ashore. She was on a voyage from Liverpool to Africa. She was refloated and put in to Ramsey, Isle of Man.
Unnamed	United Kingdom	While out of Prince Edward Island and in ballast, the Teignmouth ship was wrecked in Tor Bay, Devon.
Unnamed	United Kingdom	War of the Fifth Coalition: The ship was captured by a French privateer and was run ashore.

== February ==
=== 1 February ===
List of shipwrecks: 1 February 1810
Ship	State	Description
Atlantic	United States	The ship foundered whilst on a voyage from Portsmouth, New Hampshire, to the West Indies. Her crew were rescued by Loyal Sam (United Kingdom).
Nancy	United Kingdom	The ship was driven ashore at Gibraltar. She was on a voyage from Martinique to Gibraltar.

=== 5 February ===
List of shipwrecks: 5 February 1810
Ship	State	Description
Hannah	United Kingdom	The sloop was wrecked on a reef off "Anonmore". She was on a voyage from Killala, County Cork to Liverpool, Lancashire.

=== 6 February ===
List of shipwrecks: 6 February 1810
Ship	State	Description
Abigail	United Kingdom	The ship ran onto rocks in the Hamoaze. She was on a voyage from Plymouth, Devon to London. Abigail was refloated the next day.
Albion	United Kingdom	The ship capsized with the ultimate loss of ten of her thirteen crew. Survivors were rescued by Shaw (United Kingdom).
Izette	United Kingdom	The ship struck the pier at Liverpool, Lancashire and sank. She was on a voyage from New Brunswick, British North America to Liverpool.
Rebecca	United States	The ship ran aground at Seaford, Sussex, United Kingdom, her crew survived. Salvage efforts were abandoned on 12 February.

=== 8 February ===
List of shipwrecks: 8 February 1810
Ship	State	Description
Caesar	United Kingdom	The ship was driven ashore at South Foreland, Kent. She was on a voyage from Jamaica to London.
Ceres	United States	The ship was lost near Cork, United Kingdom. She was on a voyage from Tönningen, Duchy of Holstein to New York.

=== 9 February ===
List of shipwrecks: 9 February 1810
Ship	State	Description
Bengal	British East India Company	The East Indiaman was driven ashore and wrecked at South Foreland, Kent. She was on a voyage from Bengal, India to London.
Cæsar	United Kingdom	The ship was driven ashore and wrecked at South Foreland.
St. Christobal	United States	The ship was destroyed by fire off Gothenburg, Sweden.

=== 11 February ===
List of shipwrecks: 11 February 1810
Ship	State	Description
Hero	United Kingdom	The ship departed from Maranhão, Brazil for Liverpool, Lancashire. No further trace, presumed foundered in the Atlantic Ocean with the loss of all hands.

=== 12 February ===
List of shipwrecks: 12 February 1810
Ship	State	Description
Adventure	United Kingdom	The ship was driven ashore and wrecked on Islay. She was on a voyage from Martinique to Liverpool, Lancashire. Adventure was still ashore on 19 February but was subsequently refloated.

=== 13 February ===
List of shipwrecks: 13 February 1810
Ship	State	Description
William & Mary	United Kingdom	The ship was driven ashore on the Holderness coast, Yorkshire. Her crew were rescued. She was on a voyage from South Shields, County Durham to Blakeney, Norfolk.

=== 15 February ===
List of shipwrecks: 15 February 1810
Ship	State	Description
Nye Prove	(Denmark) Norway	The ship ran aground on the Newcombe Sand, in the North Sea off the coast of Norfolk, United Kingdom. She was refloated and taken in to Great Yarmouth, Norfolk in a waterlogged condition.
Wild Boar	Royal Navy	The Cherokee-class brig-sloop was lost on the Runnel Stone, Cornwall with the loss of 12 lives, while outward bound from Falmouth.

=== 16 February ===
List of shipwrecks: 16 February 1810
Ship	State	Description
Active	(United Kingdom of Great Britain and Ireland) New South Wales	The whaling and sealing brig departed the Open Bay Islands, New Zealand for Sydney. No further trace, presumed foundered with the loss of all hands. In 1847 a sealing party found the hull of a brig near Bluff Point, Southland, New Zealand, presumed to be the remains of the Active.
Jemima	United Kingdom	Out from Cork, the ship was driven ashore and wrecked in Whitsand Bay, Cornwall with the loss of all hands.

=== 18 February ===
List of shipwrecks: 18 February 1810
Ship	State	Description
Charles	United Kingdom	Napoleonic Wars: The ship was captured and burnt by Néréide (French Navy). She was on a voyage from Jamaica to Liverpool, Lancashire.
Ocean	United States	The ship departed from St. Ubes, Portugal for Wilmington, Delaware. No further trace, presumed foundered with the loss of all hands.

=== 19 February ===
List of shipwrecks: 19 February 1810
Ship	State	Description
Mars	United Kingdom	The brig was wrecked on the coast of New Brunswick.
Trader	United Kingdom	The sloop foundered in the North Sea off Cromer, Norfolk with the loss of all hands.

=== 20 February ===
List of shipwrecks: 20 February 1810
Ship	State	Description
Henry	United Kingdom	The ship sprang a leak and was abandoned by her crew. She was on a voyage from London to São Miguel Island, Azores.
Ongance	France	Out of Ostend, Lys for an unknown destination when she was stranded on Long Sand in the Thames Estuary.
Progress	United Kingdom	The ship was driven ashore at Bridlington, Yorkshire. She was on a voyage from South Shields, County Durham to London.
Resolution	United Kingdom	The ship was driven ashore near Winterton-on-Sea, Norfolk. Her crew were rescued.
Swallow	United Kingdom	The ship foundered in the Atlantic Ocean off the coast of County Donegal.
Unnamed	United States	The ship foundered in the Atlantic Ocean off the coast of County Donegal.

=== 21 February ===
List of shipwrecks: 21 February 1810
Ship	State	Description
Eliza	United Kingdom	The ship capsized at South Shields, County Durham.

=== 23 February ===
List of shipwrecks: 23 February 1810
Ship	State	Description
Dependance	United Kingdom	The ship departed from Plymouth, Devon for Sunderland, County Durham. No further trace, presumed foundered with the loss of all hands.

=== 24 February ===
List of shipwrecks: 24 February 1810
Ship	State	Description
Three Friends	United Kingdom	The ship was wrecked in Carnarvon Bay with the loss of five of her crew. She was on a voyage from Antigua to Dublin.

=== 25 February ===
List of shipwrecks: 25 February 1810
Ship	State	Description
Danby	United Kingdom	Napoleonic Wars: The ship was driven ashore near Seaford, Sussex whilst attempting to escape from five French privateers. Her crew survived.
Draper	United Kingdom	Napoleonic Wars: The ship was captured in the English Channel by the privateer Grand Duc de Berg (France) and four other privateers. An eleven-strong prize crew was placed on board Draper, but they were unskilled and she came ashore near Beachy Head, Sussex. The prize crew took to a boat to make their escape but it capsized with the loss of three lives. The other eight were taken prisoner by the 2nd Surrey Militia. Draper's crew survived. She was on a voyage from Belfast, County Antrim to London.
Elizabeth	United States	The ship was driven ashore and severely damaged in the Clyde. She was refloated the next day.
Graces	United Kingdom	Napoleonic Wars: The ship was driven ashore near Beachy Head whilst attempting to escape from five French privateers. Her crew survived. She was on a voyage from Belfast to London. Graces was refloated in early March and taken in to Newhaven, Sussex.
Harmony	United Kingdom	The ship was driven ashore on Islay. She was on a voyage from Greenock, Renfrewshire to Sligo.
Joseph	United Kingdom	Napoleonic Wars: The ship was driven ashore near Beachy Head whilst attempting to escape from five French privateers. Her crew survived. She was on a voyage from Belfast to London.

=== 26 February ===
List of shipwrecks: 26 February 1810
Ship	State	Description
Friendship	United Kingdom	The ship was wrecked on the Mixon Sands, in the Bristol Channel. Her crew survived.
Mary	United Kingdom	The ship struck the quayside and sank in King's Dock, Liverpool, Lancashire.

=== 28 February ===
List of shipwrecks: 28 February 1810
Ship	State	Description
Bellona	United Kingdom	Napoleonic Wars: The ship was captured and burnt by the privateer Invincible Napoleon (France). She was on a voyage from London to Amelia Island, East Florida, New Spain.
Humphreys	United Kingdom	The ship was driven ashore and wrecked at Half Moon Key, Old Harbour, Jamaica.
Sir Sidney Smith	United Kingdom	The ship sank at Port Royal, Jamaica.

=== Unknown date ===
List of shipwrecks: Unknown date in February 1810
Ship	State	Description
Alfred	United Kingdom	The ship became trapped in ice 6 nautical miles (11 km) off Prince Edward Island, British North America and was abandoned. She was on a voyage from Prince Edward Island to an English port.
American	United States	The packet ship was lost near Tönningen, Duchy of Holstein. she was on a voyage from New York to Tönningen.
Bell	United Kingdom	The ship was lost in the Orkney Islands with the loss of all hands. She was on a voyage from Heligoland to Liverpool, Lancashire.
Concord	United Kingdom	The ship was lost in Galway Bay. She was on a voyage from Limerick to Greenock, Renfrewshire.
Diana	United Kingdom	The ship driven ashore near Fowey, Cornwall. She was on a voyage from Halifax, Nova Scotia, British North America to Plymouth, Devon. Diana was refloated in late February and taken in to Fowey
Elizabeth	United Kingdom	The ship was driven ashore near Pwllheli, Caernarfonshire. She was on a voyage from London to Liverpool, Lancashire.
Elizabeth	United Kingdom	The ship was driven ashore in Dundrum Bay. She was on a voyage from Jamaica to Belfast, County Down.
Friendship	United Kingdom	The ship sank near Swansea, Glamorgan. Her crew were rescued. She was on a voyage from Tralee, County Kerry to Swansea.
Graff Bernstorf	Flag unknown	The ship was lost off Saaremaa, Russia.
Hoppett	Sweden	The ship was lost near Gothenburg. She was on a voyage from Riga, Russia to Gothenburg.
Humphries	United States	The ship foundered off Tönning. She was on a voyage from New York to Tönning.
Indiana	United Kingdom	The ship was lost at the mouth of the Eyder.
I. O.	United Kingdom	The ship was driven onto rocks at Guernsey, Channel Islands and was severely damaged. She was on a voyage from London to Guernsey. I. O. was later refloated and taken in to Guernsey.
Isabella	United Kingdom	The ship foundered in Achille Sound with the loss of all hands. She was on a voyage from Liverpool to Limerick.
Jemima	United Kingdom	The ship was driven ashore in Witsand Bay, Devon with the loss of all hands.
Mary	United Kingdom	The ship was driven ashore and wrecked near Lerwick, Shetland Islands.
Mary	United Kingdom	The ship was wrecked off Tenerife, Canary Islands, Spain. She was on a voyage from Glasgow, Renfrewshire to Tobago.
Neptune	United Kingdom	The ship was wrecked at the mouth of the Ebro. She was on a voyage from Spain to London.
Neptunus	United Kingdom	The ship was lost in the Baltic Sea.
Ocean	United Kingdom	The brig was discovered abandoned off Calais, France.
Pearl	United Kingdom	The ship foundered in the North Sea off Spurn Point, Yorkshire. Her crew were rescued.
Piper	United Kingdom	The ship was driven ashore at Newhaven, Sussex.
Rebecca	United States	The ship was driven ashore near Seaford, Sussex.
Rinaldo	Russia	The ship was wrecked on the coast of Scotland.
Royal Edward	United Kingdom	The ship was driven ashore and wrecked at Selsey Bill, Sussex. She was on a voyage from Jamaica to London.
Union	United Kingdom	The ship sank in The Wash off King's Lynn, Norfolk. Her crew were rescued.
Vrow Alida	Flag unknown	The ship was driven ashore on Gotaland, Sweden.
Vrow Gesina	Flag unknown	The ship was wrecked on the Norwegian coast.
William and Mary	United Kingdom	The ship was wrecked at Bermuda.
Zee Nymph	(Sweden) Swedish Pomerania	The ship was driven ashore at Darßer Ort.

== March ==
=== 1 March ===
List of shipwrecks: 1 March 1810
Ship	State	Description
Henrietta Charlotta	United Kingdom	The ship ran aground and sank at King's Dock, Liverpool, Lancashire. She was on a voyage from New York, United States to Liverpool.

=== 2 March ===
List of shipwrecks: 2 March 1810
Ship	State	Description
Charlotte Ann	United Kingdom	The ship was blown out to sea from Faial Island, Azores. No further trace.
Mary	United Kingdom	The ship was blown out to sea from Faial Island. No further trace.

=== 3 March ===
List of shipwrecks: 3 March 1810
Ship	State	Description
Bee	United Kingdom	The ship was wrecked on Düne, Heligoland. Her crew were rescued. She was on a voyage from London to Heligoland.

=== 4 March ===
List of shipwrecks: 4 March 1810
Ship	State	Description
Adventure	United Kingdom	The ship foundered in the Atlantic Ocean whilst bound from British Honduras to the United Kingdom.
Bee	United Kingdom	The ship was wrecked on Düne, Heligoland. Her crew were rescued. She was on a voyage from Great Yarmouth, Norfolk to Heligoland.
William	United Kingdom	The ship foundered off Cuba. Her crew survived. She was on a voyage from Jamaica to Belfast, County Antrim.

=== 5 March ===
List of shipwrecks: 5 March 1810
Ship	State	Description
Thomas	United Kingdom	The ship foundered on the Herd Sand, in the North Sea off Hartlepool, County Durham. Her crew were rescued.

=== 7 March ===
List of shipwrecks: 7 March 1810
Ship	State	Description
Amelia	Spain	The ship was driven ashore and severely damaged at Gibraltar. She was on a voyage from Alicante to London, United Kingdom.
Ceres	United Kingdom	The ship ran aground on the English Stones, in the Bristol Channel and was severely damaged. She was on a voyage from Bristol, Gloucestershire to Tobago.
Chance	United Kingdom	The brig was driven out to sea from Faial Island, Azores. No further trace.
Governor Milnes	United Kingdom	The transport ship was driven ashore in the Tagus. She was later refloated.
Hope	United Kingdom	The ship was driven ashore in the Tagus.
Margaret	United Kingdom	The ship was driven ashore at Lisbon, Portugal. She was refloated some weeks later.
London Trader	United States	The ship was blown out to sea from Faial Island. No further trace.
Mary	United Kingdom	The ship was disabled in the Tagus.
Superb	United Kingdom	The ship foundered in the Atlantic Ocean. Her crew were rescued by Shark (United Kingdom). Superb was on a voyage from New York, United States to Liverpool, Lancashire.
Susan	United Kingdom	The ship was disabled in the Tagus.
Two Brothers	United Kingdom	The ship was driven out to sea from Faial Island. No further trace.
Yorkshire	United Kingdom	The full-rigged ship was driven out to sea from Faial Island. No further trace.
William & Margaret	United Kingdom	The ship was disabled in the Tagus.

=== 8 March ===
List of shipwrecks: 8 March 1810
Ship	State	Description
Ann	United States	The ship sprang a leak and was abandoned by her crew. Her crew were rescued by Shark (United Kingdom).

=== 9 March ===
List of shipwrecks: 9 March 1810
Ship	State	Description
Nancy	United States	The ship foundered in the Atlantic Ocean. Her crew were rescued. She was on a voyage from Lisbon, Portugal to New York.

=== 10 March ===
List of shipwrecks: 10 March 1810
Ship	State	Description
Griffin	United Kingdom	The ship was driven ashore and wrecked at North Meols, Lancashire with the loss of all but three of her crew. She was on a voyage from Cork to Liverpool, Lancashire.
Montañés	Spanish Navy	The third rate ship-of-the-line was lost in a heavy storm.

=== 11 March ===
List of shipwrecks: 11 March 1810
Ship	State	Description
Beaver	United Kingdom	The ship ran aground on the Brake Sand, off Ramsgate, Kent and sank. Her crew were rescued. She was on a voyage from London to St. Vincent.
Lord Charles Spencer	United Kingdom	The ship foundered in the English Channel off Guernsey, Channel Islands. Her crew were rescued. She was on a voyage from Martinique to London

=== 13 March ===
List of shipwrecks: 13 March 1810
Ship	State	Description
Powderham Castle	United Kingdom	The ship foundered in the Atlantic Ocean. Her crew were rescued by Truelove (United Kingdom). Powderham Castle was on a voyage from London to Lisbon, Portugal.

=== 14 March ===
List of shipwrecks: 14 March 1810
Ship	State	Description
Olive	United States	The ship was driven ashore on Faial Island, Azores.

=== 15 March ===
List of shipwrecks: 15 March 1810
Ship	State	Description
Industry	United Kingdom	The ship was driven ashore and wrecked at Great Yarmouth, Norfolk. She was on a voyage from Great Yarmouth to Harwich, Essex.
Orion	United Kingdom	The ship was driven ashore and damaged in the Isles of Scilly. She was on a voyage from Hayti to London. Orion was later refloated and taken in to St. Mary's.

=== 16 March ===
List of shipwrecks: 16 March 1810
Ship	State	Description
Resource	United Kingdom	The ship was lost near Terceira Island, Azores. Her crew were rescued. She was on a voyage from Martinique to London.

=== 20 March ===
List of shipwrecks: 20 March 1810
Ship	State	Description
Hugo	United Kingdom	The ship sprang a leak and was abandoned by her crew, who were rescued by William Rathbone (United Kingdom). Hugo was on a voyage from British Honduras to London.
Lucretia	United Kingdom	The ship sprang a leak in the Atlantic Ocean and was abandoned by her crew. She was on a voyage from Liverpool, Lancashire to Trinidad.

=== 21 March ===
List of shipwrecks: 21 March 1810
Ship	State	Description
Etingdon	United Kingdom	The ship foundered off Havana, Cuba. Her crew were rescued. She was on a voyage from Jamaica to London.
Mary	(United Kingdom of Great Britain and Ireland) Guernsey	Napoleonic Wars: The ship was captured and burnt by a French privateer. She was on a voyage from Hayti to Guernsey.

=== 23 March ===
List of shipwrecks: 23 March 1810
Ship	State	Description
Juno	United Kingdom	The ship was driven ashore and damaged at Peterhead, Aberdeenshire. She was on a voyage from London to Londonderry.
Sir George Prevose	United Kingdom	The polacca was wrecked off Seaton, Devon while en route from Martinique to Liverpool, Lancashire. Part of her cargo was salvaged.

=== 24 March ===
List of shipwrecks: March 1810
Ship	State	Description
Samuel	Sweden	The brig was wrecked near Walmer Castle, Kent, United Kingdom.
Twee Vrienden	Flag unknown	The ship was driven ashore near Margate, Kent. She was later refloated and taken in to Margate.

=== 25 March ===
List of shipwrecks: 25 March 1810
Ship	State	Description
Britannia	United Kingdom	The ship was driven ashore at Ballyvaston, County Down.
Brothers	United Kingdom	The ship, out from Newport, Monmouthshire, was stranded and became a total loss near Padstow, Cornwall.
Brothers	United Kingdom	The ship was driven ashore near Wexford with the loss of two of her crew. She was refloated in early June and taken in to Wexford.
Eliza	United Kingdom	The ship was driven ashore near Beaumaris, Anglesey. She was on a voyage from Holyhead, Anglesey to Liverpool, Lancashire.
Etingdon	United Kingdom	The ship was lost off Havana, Captaincy General of Cuba. Her crew were rescued. She was on a voyage from Jamaica to London.
Havant	United Kingdom	The ship was driven ashore near Wexford. Her crew were rescued. She was on a voyage from Plymouth, Devon to Beaumaris. Havant was refloated in May and taken in to Wexford.
Invincible	United Kingdom	The sloop was driven ashore at Bray, County Wicklow. She was on a voyage from Aberystwyth, Cardiganshire to Liverpool.
Juno	United Kingdom	The ship was driven ashore at Ardglass, County Down.
Maxwell and Edgar	United Kingdom	The ship was driven ashore near Beaumaris. She was on a voyage from Waterford to Liverpool.
Minerva	United Kingdom	The ship was driven ashore and wrecked at Strangford, County Down with the loss of two of her crew. She was on a voyage from Youghall, County Cork to Liverpool.
Molly	United Kingdom	The ship was wrecked near Strangford with the loss of all hands.
Sally	United Kingdom	The ship was lost with all hands near Wexford.
Theresa Catharina	United Kingdom	The ship was wrecked at Start Point, Devon with the loss of all but one of her crew. She was on a voyage from London to Plymouth, Devon.

=== 26 March ===
List of shipwrecks: 26 March 1810
Ship	State	Description
Friends	United Kingdom	The ship was wrecked near Peterhead, Aberdeenshire. She was on a voyage from London to Aberdeen.
Margaret	United Kingdom	The ship was wrecked off Dundalk, County Louth. She was on a voyage from London to Newry, County Antrim.
Mary	United Kingdom	The sloop foundered in the Atlantic Ocean off Land's End, Cornwall. Her crew were rescued.
Windsor	United Kingdom	The ship was driven ashore near Waterford. She was on a voyage from Limerick to Liverpool, Lancashire.

=== 29 March ===
List of shipwrecks: 29 March 1810
Ship	State	Description
Kitty	United Kingdom	The ship struck the Hoyle Bank, in Liverpool Bay and foundered. She was on a voyage from Sligo to Liverpool, Lancashire.

=== 30 March ===
List of shipwrecks: 30 March 1810
Ship	State	Description
Resolution	United States	The ship was driven ashore at Cape Henry, Virginia. She was on a voyage from Cádiz, Spain to Norfolk, Virginia.
Theresa Catherina	United Kingdom	The London-registered sailing ship was a total loss, with only one man saved, when she was wrecked at Start Point, Devon. She was en route from "Haslow" to Plymouth, Devon.

=== Unknown date ===
List of shipwrecks: Unknown date in March 1810
Ship	State	Description
Alexander	United Kingdom	The ship was driven ashore in the Rio Grande. She was on a voyage from Liverpool, Lancashire to Pernambuco, Brazil.
Apollo	United States	Peninsular War: The ship was driven ashore in Cádiz Bay, between 6 and 8 March. She was burnt by the French.
Ariadne	United States	The ship was driven ashore on Cádiz Bay between 6 and 8 March. She was later refloated.
Augusta	Danzig	The brig was wrecked in the Baltic Sea.
Charlotte	United Kingdom	The ship was wrecked at Gibraltar between 3 and 8 March.
Cleveland	United Kingdom	The ship foundered in the English Channel off Jersey, Channel Islands. She was on a voyage from Bristol, Gloucestershire to Guernsey, Channel Islands.
Commerce	United States	Peninsular War: Captain Brown's ship was driven ashore in Cádiz Bay, between 6 and 8 March. She was burnt by the French.
Commerce	United States	Peninsular War: Captain Coulburn's ship was driven ashore in Cádiz Bay, between 6 and 8 March. She was burnt by the French.
Conceiao	Spain	The ship ran aground on the Hoyle Bank, in Liverpool Bay. Her crew were rescued. Conceiao was later refloated and taken in to Liverpool, Lancashire, United Kingdom.
Conceptione	Spanish Navy	The 120-gun ship of the line was driven ashore at Cádiz between 7 and 11 March. She may have been subsequently set afire and destroyed.
Danebrog	Denmark	The ship was destroyed by fire off Cromer, Norfolk, United Kingdom with some loss of life.
Eleanor	United Kingdom	The ship was driven ashore at Beaumaris, Anglesey. She was on a voyage from Beaumaris to Liverpool.
El Rasteira	Portugal	The ship was driven ashore at Bowmore, Islay, Scotland. She was on a voyage from Brazil to Greenock, Renfrewshire.
Enterprize	United Kingdom	The ship was driven ashore at Terceira, Spain.
Experiment	United Kingdom	The brig was wrecked at Cádiz between 6 and 8 March with the loss of a crew member.
Felicity	United Kingdom	The ship was driven ashore in the Tagus between 4 and 8 March.
Fortune	United States	The ketch was dismasted and was abandoned by her crew.
Fox	United Kingdom	The transport ship was driven ashore and wrecked at Cádiz between 6 and 8 March.
Frau Magdalena	Flag unknown	The ship was wrecked on the Norwegian coast.
Franklin	United States	Peninsular War: The ship was driven ashore in Cádiz Bay, between 6 and 8 March. She was burnt by the French.
Friendship	United Kingdom	The ship was driven ashore in Bigbury Bay, Devon while en route from Waterford to Arundel, Sussex.
Freundschaft	Flag unknown	The ship was wrecked on Götland, Sweden.
General Von Kroeg	Sweden	The ship was wrecked on Götland with much loss of life.
Harmonia do Cul	Portugal	The ship ran aground and capsized in the River Lagan. She was on a voyage from Buenos Aires to Belfast, County Antrim, United Kingdom.
Harriet	United Kingdom	The transport ship was wrecked at Lisbon between 4 and 8 March.
Henrietta	United Kingdom	Peninsular War: The brig was burnt at Cádiz between 6 and 8 March with the loss of a crew member.
Henrietta	(United Kingdom of Great Britain and Ireland) Gibraltar	The full-rigged ship was driven ashore and wrecked at Cádiz between 6 and 8 March. Her crew were rescued.
Jean and Bell	United Kingdom	The ship was destroyed by fire. She was on a voyage from Leith, Lothian to Coleraine, County Antrim.
John	United Kingdom	The ship was driven ashore at Tyninghame, Lothian. She was on a voyage from Porto, Portugal to Leith, Lothian.
John Bull	United Kingdom	The ship was driven ashore in the Tagus between 4 and 8 March.
Jolly Tar	United Kingdom	The brig was wrecked at Cádiz between 6 and 8 March. Her crew were rescued.
Lady Ann	United Kingdom	The ship was driven ashore at Beaumaris. She was on a voyage from Waterford to Liverpool.
La Reyna	Portuguese Navy	The 74-gun ship of the line was driven ashore at Cádiz between 7 and 11 March, Her crew were rescued by HMS Invincible (Royal Navy) before she was set afire and destroyed.
Lively Lass	United Kingdom	The ship foundered off Liverpool. She was on a voyage from Liverpool to Cork.
Margaret	United Kingdom	The ship was driven ashore in the Tagus between 4 and 8 March. She was on a voyage from Lisbon to Liverpool.
Maria	United Kingdom	The ship was wrecked off St. Lucar, Spain. Her crew were rescued. She was on a voyage from Plymouth, Devon to Seville, Spain.
Maria I	Portuguese Navy	The third rate ship of the line was driven ashore at Cádiz between 6 and 8 March. She was subsequently burnt.
Mary	United Kingdom	The ship was driven ashore and wrecked near Bangor, Caernarfonshire She was on a voyage from Galway to Liverpool or Greenock, Renfrewshire.
Mary	United Kingdom	The ship was driven ashore near Lymington, Hampshire. She was later refloated.
Mary	United Kingdom	The ship was driven ashore and wrecked on Faial Island, Azores.
Nancy	(United Kingdom of Great Britain and Ireland) Gibraltar	The ship was wrecked at Gibraltar between 3 and 8 March. She was on a voyage from Gibraltar to Malta
Oder	Danzig	The brig was wrecked in the Baltic Sea.
Olive Green	United Kingdom	The ship was driven ashore and wrecked at Winterton-on-Sea, Norfolk.
Otter	United Kingdom	The transport ship, a brig, was driven ashore at Cádiz between 6 and 8 March.
Paz	Spanish Navy	The frigate was driven ashore at Cádiz between 7 and 11 March. She was set afire and destroyed by the French.
Pompey	United States	Peninsular War: The ship was driven ashore in Cádiz Bay, between 6 and 8 March. She was burnt by the French.
Princess Royal	United Kingdom	The ship was driven ashore and wrecked on Faial Island.
Providence	United Kingdom	The schooner was driven ashore and wrecked at Cádiz between 6 and 8 March.
Purissima Conceptión	Spanish Navy	The 114-gun ship of the line was driven ashore and wrecked at Cádiz between 7 and 11 March.
Rachel	United Kingdom	The ship was wrecked at Faial Island, Azores with the loss of six of her crew.
Ranger	United Kingdom	The ship departed from Heligoland for Hull. No further trace, presumed foundered with the loss of all hands.
Recovery	United Kingdom	The ship was lost near Vigo, Spain. She was on a voyage from London to Porto.
Resolution	United Kingdom	The schooner was driven ashore at Cádiz between 6 and 8 March.
Richard	United Kingdom	The transport ship was driven ashore and wrecked at Cádiz between 6 and 8 March.
Sacra Familia	Spain	Peninsular War: The ship was driven ashore near "Martagoorda", where she was pillaged and burnt by the French. She was on a voyage from Cádiz to Gibraltar.
Sally and Lois	United Kingdom	The ship was sunk by ice off the coast of Newfoundland, British North America. Her crew were rescued. She was on a voyage from Bristol to Newfoundland.
San Nicola	United Kingdom	The full-rigged ship was driven ashore and wrecked at Cádiz between 6 and 8 March. Her crew were rescued.
San Ramon	Spanish Navy	The 74-gun ship of the line was driven ashore at Cádiz between 7 and 11 March. She was set afire and destroyed by the French.
San Vera	Sweden	The ship was wrecked on Öland. She was on a voyage from Gävle to London.
Smilax	United States	Peninsular War: The ship was driven ashore in Cádiz Bay, between 6 and 8 March. She was burnt by the French.
Sophia	United Kingdom	The ship was wrecked at Lisbon between 4 and 8 March. She was on a voyage from London to Malta.
Swift	United Kingdom	The ship was wrecked on the Herd Sand, in the North Sea off Hartlepool, County Durham. She was on a voyage from Porto to Newcastle upon Tyne, Northumberland.
Thomas	United Kingdom	The ship sank in the Eider.
Thomas Jefferson	United States	The ship was driven ashore and wrecked at Cádiz between 6 and 8 March.
Three Brothers	United Kingdom	The ship was wrecked near North Meols, Lancashire.
Union	United Kingdom	The ship was run down and sunk by HMS Argus (Royal Navy). Her crew were rescued. She was on a voyage from Poole, Dorset to Waterford.
Venus	United States	The ship foundered off Islay with the loss of all hands. She was on a voyage from Portsmouth, New Hampshire, to Liverpool.

== April ==
=== 2 April ===
List of shipwrecks: 2 April 1810
Ship	State	Description
Biddeford	United Kingdom	The ship was sunk by ice off the coast of Newfoundland, British North America. She was on a voyage from Bristol, Gloucestershire to Newfoundland.
Charles	United Kingdom	Napoleonic Wars: The brig was captured off Cape Tiberoon by two French privateers and was burnt. She was on a voyage from Port-au-Prince, Haiti to London.
Proxy	United Kingdom	Napoleonic Wars: The ship was driven ashore at Dungeness, Kent by a French privateer. Her crew were rescued. She was on a voyage from Newcastle upon Tyne, Northumberland to Jersey, Channel Islands. Proxy was refloated two days later and taken in to Dover, Kent.

=== 3 April ===
List of shipwrecks: 3 April 1810
Ship	State	Description
Cupido	Portugal	The ship was lost at Porto. She was on a voyage from Pernambuco, Brazil to Porto.
Swift	United Kingdom	The ship foundered in Whitesand Bay, Cornwall. She was on a voyage from Cork to London.

=== 4 April ===
List of shipwrecks: 4 April 1810
Ship	State	Description
HMS Cuckoo	Royal Navy	The Cuckoo-class schooner was wrecked on the Haak Sands, in the North Sea off Texel, North Holland, First French Empire with the loss of two of her crew.
George	United Kingdom	The sloop was driven ashore crewless and dismasted at Land's End, Cornwall.

=== 5 April ===
List of shipwrecks: 5 April 1810
Ship	State	Description
Lester	United Kingdom	The ship foundered in the Atlantic Ocean (40°00′N 19°30′W). Her crew were rescued. She was on a voyage from Poole, Dorset to Newfoundland, British North America.

=== 7 April ===
List of shipwrecks: 9 April 1810
Ship	State	Description
Blyth Lifeboat	United Kingdom	The lifeboat was wrecked off Hartley Bates Isle, Northumberland with the loss of 25 of the 27 people on board.
Unnamed	United Kingdom	The coble was wrecked at Hartlepool, County Durham. Her crew were rescued.

=== 9 April ===
List of shipwrecks: 9 April 1810
Ship	State	Description
Beaufoy	United Kingdom	The brig was wrecked on the Stoney Binks, in the North Sea. Her crew were rescued. She was on a voyage from Sunderland, County Durham to Shoreham-by-Sea, Sussex.

=== 11 April ===
List of shipwrecks: 11 April 1810
Ship	State	Description
Dorathea	Denmark–Norway	The ship was wrecked in the Shetland Islands, United Kingdom. Her crew were rescued.
George	United Kingdom	The crewless sloop was driven ashore near Land's End, Cornwall.
Gurnier	Denmark–Norway	The ship was wrecked in the Shetland Islands with the loss of eighteen of her twenty-one crew.
Unnamed	Denmark–Norway	The ship was wrecked in the Shetland Islands.

=== 12 April ===
List of shipwrecks: 12 April 1810
Ship	State	Description
Entrega	Flag unknown	The ship ran aground on the Margate Sand, Kent, United Kingdom. She was on a voyage from London, United Kingdom to the Brazils.
Hoffnung	(Denmark) Norway	The ship ran aground on the Lemon Sand, in the North Sea. She was on a voyage from Christiania to London. She was refloated with the assistance of two British fishing smacks and taken in to the Humber.
Vrouw Catherina	Flag unknown	The ship was driven ashore and wrecked at Stockton-on-Tees, Yorkshire, United Kingdom.

=== 14 April ===
List of shipwrecks: 14 April 1810
Ship	State	Description
Exchange	United Kingdom	The ship was driven ashore and wrecked at Scarborough, Yorkshire.

=== 16 April ===
List of shipwrecks: 16 April 1810
Ship	State	Description
Hector	United Kingdom	The ship was run down and sunk in the English Channel off Beachy Head, Sussex. Her crew were rescued. She was on a voyage from Cardiff, Glamorgan to London.

=== 18 April ===
List of shipwrecks: 18 April 1810
Ship	State	Description
Happy Return	United Kingdom	The ship was wrecked on the Dudden Sands, in the Irish Sea with the loss of fifteen lives. She was on a voyage from Workington, Cumberland to Liverpool, Lancashire.
Hector	United Kingdom	The ship was run down and sunk in the English Channel off Beachy Head, Sussex. Her crew were rescued. She was on a voyage from Cardiff, Glamorgan to London.

=== 24 April ===
List of shipwrecks: 24 April 1810
Ship	State	Description
Maria	Portugal	The ship departed from Madeira for Pernambuco, Brazil. No further trace, presumed foundered with the loss of all hands.

=== 25 April ===
List of shipwrecks: 25 April 1810
Ship	State	Description
Coffee Planter	United Kingdom	The ship departed from Gravesend, Kent for Surinam. No further trace, presumed foundered with the loss of all hands.
Richard and Mary	United Kingdom	The ship was lost near the mouth of the Río Docé, Brazil. She was on a voyage from London to Rio de Janeiro, Viceroyalty of the Río de la Plata.

=== 26 April ===
List of shipwrecks: 26 April 1810
Ship	State	Description
Herald	United States	The ship sprang a leak and was abandoned in the Atlantic Ocean. Her crew were rescued by Hamilton (United Kingdom).

=== Unknown date ===
List of shipwrecks: Unknown date in April 1810
Ship	State	Description
Albion	United Kingdom	The ship was lost whilst on a voyage from Poole, Dorset to Liverpool, Lancashire. Her crew were rescued.
Ave Maria e Almas	United Kingdom	The yacht was lost at São Miguel Island, Azores.
Dart	United Kingdom	The ship was wrecked at Faial, Azores.
Bacchus	United States	The ship was lost near Texel, North Holland, First French Empire.
Dorothea	(Denmark) Norway	The ship was wrecked in the Shetland Islands, United Kingdom.
Eendraght	Prussia	The galiot was wrecked on the Gunfleet Sand, in the North Sea off the coast of Essex, United Kingdom.
Fenwick	United Kingdom	The ship was wrecked in the Orkney Islands. Her crew were rescued. She was on a voyage from North Shields, Northumberland to Pictou, Nova Scotia, British North America.
Fleche	United Kingdom	The sloop was wrecked in the Ems.
Flora	United Kingdom	The ship was lost at Trondheim, Norway.
Flor do Mar	Spain	The ship was lost in Vigo Bay.
Gurnior	(Denmark) Norway	The ship was wrecked in the Shetland Islands.
Gute Both	Sweden	The ship foundered in the Baltic Sea. She was on a voyage from Carlshamn to Wismar, Swedish Pomerania.
Joseph and Betsey	United Kingdom	The ship was wrecked at A Coruña, Spain. She was on a voyage from London to Lisbon, Portugal.
Olive Branch	United Kingdom	The ship foundered in the Atlantic Ocean (approximately 43°N 47°W). Her crew were rescued by Allegeny (United Kingdom).
Protheus	United Kingdom	The ship foundered whilst on a voyage from London to Malta with the loss of all but one of her crew.
Richard	United Kingdom	The ship was lost near Holyhead, Anglesey with the loss of all hands. She was on a voyage from Waterford to Liverpool.
Sisters	United Kingdom	The ship was wrecked at São Miguel Island.
Speedwell	United Kingdom	The ship foundered in Cardigan Bay.
Sukey and Sally	United States	The ship sprang a leak and was abandoned by her crew. She was on a voyage from Salem, Massachusetts, to Saint Petersburg, Russia.
Thomas and Mary	United Kingdom	The ship foundered in the Irish Sea. She was on a voyage from Cornwall to a Welsh port.

== May ==
=== 2 May ===
List of shipwrecks: 2 May 1810
Ship	State	Description
Richmond	Royal Navy	The Confounder-class gun-brig ran aground on the Shipwash Sand, in the North Sea off the coast of Essex. She was escorting a convoy from the Nore to Heligoland. She was later refloated and returned to service.

=== 3 May ===
List of shipwrecks: 3 May 1810
Ship	State	Description
Tweed	United Kingdom	The ship departed from The Downs for Tobago. She had not arrived by 6 July, presumed foundered.

=== 5 May ===
List of shipwrecks: 5 May 1810
Ship	State	Description
Gratis	(Denmark) Norway	The ship was wrecked in the Shetland Islands, United Kingdom with the loss of fifteen of her nineteen crew. She was on a voyage from Dram to Cork, United Kingdom.
Unnamed	United Kingdom	The barge was driven ashore in Bigbury Bay. She was on a voyage from Salcombe to Plymouth, Devon.

=== 6 May ===
List of shipwrecks: 6 May 1810
Ship	State	Description
Devonshire	United Kingdom	The ship was sunk by ice off the coast of Newfoundland, British North America. She was on a voyage from Newfoundland to London.

=== 7 May ===
List of shipwrecks: 7 May 1810
Ship	State	Description
Industry	United Kingdom	The ship was driven ashore at Corton, Suffolk. She was on a voyage from Deal, Kent to Newcastle upon Tyne, Northumberland.
Sarah Milner	(United Kingdom of Great Britain and Ireland) Jamaica	The ship was driven ashore on Morris Island, near Charleston, South Carolina, United States. She was on a voyage from Havana, Cuba to Jamaica.

=== 8 May ===
List of shipwrecks: 8 May 1810
Ship	State	Description
Oak	United Kingdom	The ship was driven ashore and damaged at the mouth of the Clyde. She was on a voyage from Greenock, Renfrewshire to Halifax, Nova Scotia, British North America.

=== 9 May ===
List of shipwrecks: 9 May 1810
Ship	State	Description
Devonshire	United Kingdom	The ship struck ice off the coast of Newfoundland, British North America and foundered. she was on a voyage from Newfoundland to London.
Hammond	United Kingdom	The ship foundered off the Tuskar Rock, in the Irish Sea. She was on a voyage from Whitehaven, Cumberland to an Irish port.
Kristina-Ulyana (Кристина-Ульяна)	Imperial Russian Navy	The transport ship ran aground on the Bryachislav Bank in the Gulf of Finland, approx. 10 nautical miles (19 km) southwest of Harmaja. Her crew were rescued. She was on a voyage from Reval and Sveaborg, Grand Duchy of Finland.
Samuel	United Kingdom	The ship was wrecked near Bridlington, Yorkshire.
Vrouw Johanna	Sweden	Wrecked at Staddon Point in Plymouth Sound while on a voyage from Plymouth, Devon, United Kingdom to Gothenburg.

=== 11 May ===
List of shipwrecks: 11 May 1810
Ship	State	Description
Santa Cruz	Portugal	The ship was lost at Porto. She was on a voyage from Maranhão, Brazil to Porto.
Unnamed	Sweden	The galiot was wrecked on Raughley Ben Island, County Donegal, United Kingdom. She was on a voyage from Gothenburg to Newry, County Antrim, United Kingdom.

=== 14 May ===
List of shipwrecks: 14 May 1810
Ship	State	Description
Exchange	United Kingdom	The ship was driven ashore and wrecked near Scarborough, Yorkshire.

=== 16 May ===
List of shipwrecks: 16 May 1810
Ship	State	Description
Castilla	Spanish Navy	The ship of the line ran aground on the Trocadero Sandbank in the Bay of Cádiz.

=== 19 May ===
List of shipwrecks: 19 May 1810
Ship	State	Description
Ann	United Kingdom	The ship was holed by her anchor at Liverpool, Lancashire. She was on a voyage from Rio de Janeiro, Viceroyalty of the Río de la Plata to Liverpool.

=== 20 May ===
List of shipwrecks: 20 May 1810
Ship	State	Description
Margaret	United States	The ship capsized in a squall (40°00′N 39°30′W). She was on a voyage from Naples to Salem, Massachusetts.

=== 26 May ===
List of shipwrecks: 26 May 1810
Ship	State	Description
Herald	United States	The ship sprang a leak and was abandoned by her crew, who were rescued by Hamilton (United Kingdom). Herald was on a voyage from Lisbon, Portugal to Philadelphia, Pennsylvania.

=== 27 May ===
List of shipwrecks: 27 May 1810
Ship	State	Description
Lord Sheffield	United Kingdom	The ship capsized at Trinidad.
Thetis	United Kingdom	The ship was in collision with Mary (United States) and foundered off Cape Falcon. Her crew were rescued by Mary. Thetis was on a voyage from Sardinia to Cádiz, Spain.

=== 28 May ===
List of shipwrecks: 28 May 1810
Ship	State	Description
Topsham Beauty	United Kingdom	The ship was abandoned in the Atlantic Ocean. She was on a voyage from Wilmington, Delaware, United States to Liverpool, Lancashire.

=== 30 May ===
List of shipwrecks: 30 May 1810
Ship	State	Description
Rodney	United Kingdom	The whaler was wrecked on the coast of Greenland.

=== 31 May ===
List of shipwrecks: 31 May 1810
Ship	State	Description
Caerwent	United Kingdom	The ship was lost at Jackmel, Hayti. She was on a voyage from Jackmel to London.
Rebecca	British East India Company	The East Indiaman was destroyed by fire with the loss of a crew member. She was on a voyage from Bombay, India to London.

=== Unknown date ===
List of shipwrecks: Unknown date in May 1810
Ship	State	Description
Alexander	United Kingdom	The ship was wrecked on Spurn Point, Yorkshire.
Edward	United Kingdom	The ship was wrecked on the Shipwash Sand, in the North Sea off the coast of Essex. Her crew were rescued. She was on a voyage from Aberdeen to London.
Freundschaft	Sweden	The ship was wrecked on the Whiting Sand, in the North Sea off Felixstowe, Suffolk. She was on a voyage from Liverpool, Lancashire, United Kingdom to Gothenburg
Grace	United Kingdom	The ship was lost whilst on a voyage from Liverpool to Heligoland.
Polly	United Kingdom	The ship was wrecked at sea. She was discovered crewless on 28 May at 44°45′N 18°00′W by Queen Charlotte (United Kingdom).
Samuel	United Kingdom	The hoy was driven ashore and wrecked at Bridlington, East Riding of Yorkshire.
Susan	United Kingdom	The ship was wrecked at Faial, Azores, Portugal.
Temirario	Portugal	The ship foundered off Sardinia. Her crew were rescued. She was on a voyage from Malta to Lisbon.
Triton	United Kingdom	The ship foundered in the Baltic Sea off Falsterbo, Sweden. Her crew were rescued.
Vengeance	United Kingdom	The ship was lost near St. Lucar, Spain. She was on a voyage from Gibraltar to St. Ubes, Portugal.
Young Edward	United Kingdom	The brig foundered in the North Sea off the mouth of the Humber with the loss of her captain.

== June ==
=== 1 June ===
List of shipwrecks: 1 June 1810
Ship	State	Description
Polly	United Kingdom	The ship foundered in the Atlantic Ocean. Her crew were rescued by Aristides (United States). Polly was on a voyage from Whitby, Yorkshire to Saint John, New Brunswick, British North America.

=== 3 June ===
List of shipwrecks: 3 June 1810
Ship	State	Description
Trial	United Kingdom	The sloop was driven ashore and wrecked at Kettleness, Yorkshire.

=== 5 June ===
List of shipwrecks: 5 June 1810
Ship	State	Description
Tryal	United Kingdom	The ship was driven ashore at Kettleness, Yorkshire. Her crew were rescued.

=== 7 June ===
List of shipwrecks: 7 June 1810
Ship	State	Description
Eliza	United Kingdom	The ship departed Alicante, Spain for an English port. No further trace, presumed foundered with the loss of all hands.
Merchant Taylor	United Kingdom	The ship foundered whilst on a voyage from Newport, Monmouthshire to Plymouth, Devon. Her crew were rescued.

=== 14 June ===
List of shipwrecks: 14 June 1810
Ship	State	Description
HMS Porgey	Royal Navy	The Ballahoo-class schooner ran aground in the Scheldt. Her crew burnt her to prevent the French capturing her.
Young Maria	United Kingdom	The ship foundered in the Atlantic Ocean 400 nautical miles (740 km) west of Tory Island, County Donegal. Her crew survived.

=== 16 June ===
List of shipwrecks: 16 June 1810
Ship	State	Description
Lovely Lass	United Kingdom	The ship was lost at Guadeloupe. She was on a voyage from Guadeloupe to Liverpool, Lancashire.

=== 19 June ===
List of shipwrecks: 19 June 1810
Ship	State	Description
Rose Hill	United Kingdom	The ship was driven ashore in Colwell Bay, Isle of Wight. She was on a voyage from Waterford to London. Rose Hill was refloated on 21 June.

=== 20 June ===
List of shipwrecks: 20 June 1810
Ship	State	Description
Anne	United Kingdom	The transport ship was wrecked on the Long Sand, in the North Sea off the coast of Essex. Her crew were rescued.
Jane	United Kingdom	The transport ship ran aground on the Lond Sand and lost her rudder. She was later refloated and taken in to Harwich, Essex.

=== 21 June ===
List of shipwrecks: 21 June 1810
Ship	State	Description
Anne	United Kingdom	The ship ran aground and was wrecked in the North Sea 12 nautical miles (22 km) off the coast of Essex.

=== 27 June ===
List of shipwrecks: 27 June 1810
Ship	State	Description
William and Agnes	United Kingdom	The ship foundered in the Atlantic Ocean (46°36′N 41°00′W). Her crew were rescued by Harpooner (United Kingdom).

=== Unknown date ===
List of shipwrecks: Unknown date in June 1810
Ship	State	Description
Caroline	United Kingdom	The ship ran aground in the River Thames at Blackwall, Middlesex and was severely damaged. She was on a voyage from Saint Kitts to London.
General Don	(United Kingdom of Great Britain and Ireland) Jersey	The privateer was run down and sunk in the Bay of Biscay. Her crew were rescued.
Joseph and Betsey	United Kingdom	The ship was destroyed by fire at Torquay, Devon. She was on a voyage from London to Torquay and Teignmouth, Devon.

== July ==
=== 12 July ===
List of shipwrecks: 12 July 1810
Ship	State	Description
Aurora	United Kingdom	The ship sank at Point-à-Pitre, Guadeloupe. She was on a voyage from Liverpool, Lancashire to Point-à-Pitre.
William	United Kingdom	The ship capsized in a squall at Point-à-Pitre with the loss of five of her crew. She was later righted, repaired and returned to service.

=== 17 July ===
List of shipwrecks: 17 July 1810
Ship	State	Description
Dragon	United Kingdom	The ship foundered in the Caribbean Sea off Jacmel, Haiti. She was on a voyage from San Domingo to Kingston, Jamaica.

=== 22 July ===
List of shipwrecks: 22 July 1810
Ship	State	Description
Aftrivedo	Spain	The ship was wrecked on Anegada, Virgin Islands.
Elizabeth & Margaret	United Kingdom	The ship was driven ashore near "Androssa" with the loss of eight or nine lives. She was on a voyage from Dublin to Glasgow, Renfrewshire.
Resolution	United Kingdom	The ship departed from Saint Domingo for London. No further trace, presumed foundered with the loss of all hands.

=== 23 July ===
List of shipwrecks: 23 July 1810
Ship	State	Description
Albion	United Kingdom	The ship was destroyed by fire whilst on a voyage from Sardinia to London. Her crew were rescued.
Earl Camden	(British East India Company)	The East Indiaman was destroyed by fire at Bombay, India.
Elizabeth	United Kingdom	The ship was abandoned in the Atlantic Ocean (46°12′N 38°30′W) before 28 July. Her crew were rescued by Amphion (United Kingdom).

=== 24 July ===
List of shipwrecks: 24 July 1810
Ship	State	Description
Three Brothers	United Kingdom	The ship foundered in the Atlantic Ocean off Land's End, Cornwall with the loss of all hands. She was on a voyage from Swansea, Glamorgan to Dartmouth, Devon.
Unnamed	Spain	War of the Fifth Coalition: The ship was captured and sunk by the privateer Dame Ernouff (France). She was on a voyage from London, United Kingdom to Caracas, Captaincy General of Venezuela.

=== 25 July ===
List of shipwrecks: 25 July 1810
Ship	State	Description
May	United Kingdom	The ship was destroyed by fire at Havana, Cuba. Her crew were rescued.

=== 27 July ===
List of shipwrecks: 27 July 1810
Ship	State	Description
Mary-Ann	United Kingdom	The ship was wrecked on the Portuguese coast. Her crew were rescued. She was on a voyage from Liverpool, Lancashire to Viana do Castelo, Portugal.

=== 29 July ===
List of shipwrecks: 29 July 1810
Ship	State	Description
Mercurius	United Kingdom	The ship foundered. Her crew were rescued. She was on a voyage from Lisbon, Portugal to London.
Point-a-Petre	United Kingdom	The ship foundered off Point-a-Petre, Guadeloupe. She was on a voyage from Guadeloupe to London.

=== Unknown date ===
List of shipwrecks: Unknown date in July 1810
Ship	State	Description
Catherine	United Kingdom	The ship sprang a leak and foundered. She was on a voyage from Leith, Lothian to a Mediterranean port.
Duchess of York	United Kingdom	The ship was lost neat Littlehampton, Sussex. She was on a voyage from London to Redbridge, Hampshire.
Falcon	United States	The ship was captured by a French privateer whilst on a voyage from Savannah, Georgia, to a Baltic port. She was taken in to Wismar, Swedish Pomerania and was destroyed there.
Fanny	United Kingdom	The transport ship was driven ashore at the Cape of Good Hope.
Flora	(United Kingdom of Great Britain and Ireland) Cape Colony	The coaster, a brig, was driven ashore at the Cape of Good Hope.
Martha	United Kingdom	The ship sailed from a Chinese port for Bengal. No further trace, presumed foundered with the loss of all hands.
Retrieve	United Kingdom	The ship was driven ashore near Liverpool, Lancashire. She was on a voyage from Jamaica to Ireland and Liverpool.
Sir James Gambier	United Kingdom	The transport ship was driven ashore at the Cape of Good Hope.
Susannah	Sweden	The ship was wrecked on the coast of Scotland. She was on a voyage from Liverpool to Uddevalla.
Unity	United Kingdom	The ship was driven ashore near Galway. She was on a voyage from Galway to Liverpool.

== August ==
=== 3 August ===
List of shipwrecks: 3 August 1810
Ship	State	Description
Mary	United Kingdom	The West Indiaman was wrecked on the Scarweather Sands, in the Bristol Channel with the loss of three of her ten crew. She was on a voyage from Demerara to Bristol, Gloucestershire.

=== 7 August ===
List of shipwrecks: 7 August 1810
Ship	State	Description
Minerve	United Kingdom	The brig was wrecked on the Shivering Sand, off Margate, Kent. Her crew were rescued. She was on a voyage from Malta to London.

=== 9 August ===
List of shipwrecks: 9 August 1810
Ship	State	Description
Meanwell	United Kingdom	The ship was wrecked on the Herd Sand, in the North Sea off Hartlepool, County Durham. Her crew were rescued.
Purísima Concepción	Spain	Sunk by French naval forces off Cádiz.

=== 10 August ===
List of shipwrecks: 10 August 1810
Ship	State	Description
HMS Lively	Royal Navy	The frigate was wrecked on the coast of Malta. Her crew survived.
Rosetti	United Kingdom	The ship was wrecked on the Spit Sand, in the Bristol Channel. She was on a voyage from Saint Vincent to Bristol, Gloucestershire.

=== 11 August ===
List of shipwrecks: 11 August 1810
Ship	State	Description
Ann	United Kingdom	The ship was run down and severely damaged in the King Road by Caledonia (United Kingdom). She was kept afloat by her cargo of timber. Ann was on a voyage from Bristol, Gloucestershire to London.
Patriot	United Kingdom	The ship was last heard of on this date, presumed subsequently foundered with the loss of all hands.

=== 12 August ===
List of shipwrecks: 12 August 1810
Ship	State	Description
Adriana	United Kingdom	The brig was driven ashore in a hurricane at Trinidad.
Aeliae	United States	The brig was driven ashore in a hurricane at Trinidad.
Dapper	United Kingdom	The sloop was driven ashore in a hurricane at Trinidad.
Dispatch	United Kingdom	The sloop was driven ashore in a hurricane at Trinidad.
Emeline	United Kingdom	The schooner was driven ashore in a hurricane at Trinidad.
George	United Kingdom	The ship was driven ashore in a hurricane at Trinidad.
Grenada	United Kingdom	The ship was lost in Mount's Bay with the loss of all hands. She was on a voyage from Grenada to London. Also reported as lost off Land's End, Cornwall.
Harriet	United Kingdom	The sloop was sunk in a hurricane at Trinidad.
Industry	United Kingdom	The ship was in collision with another vessel and foundered in the "Cockle Gott". Her crew were rescued.
Iris	United Kingdom	The brig was driven ashore in a hurricane at Trinidad.
Juno	United Kingdom	The full-rigged ship was wrecked in Mount's Bay with the loss of all hands.
Laura	United States	The schooner was driven onto rocks and wrecked at Barbados.
HM Hired armed schooner Lemon	Royal Navy	The schooner was driven ashore in a hurricane at Trinidad.
Mercury	United Kingdom	The schooner was driven ashore in a hurricane at Trinidad.
HM Hired armed sloop Orange	Royal Navy	The sloop was driven ashore in a hurricane at Trinidad.
Pallas	United Kingdom	The brig was driven ashore in a hurricane at Trinidad.
HM Hired armed sloop Point Gourde	Royal Navy	The sloop was driven ashore in a hurricane at Trinidad.
Polly	United Kingdom	The sloop was sunk in a hurricane at Trinidad. She was later refloated.
Quick Time	United Kingdom	The brig was driven ashore in a hurricane at Trinidad.
Seaflower	United Kingdom	The schooner was driven ashore in a hurricane at Trinidad.
Two Friends	United Kingdom	The ship was wrecked on the Whiting Sands, in the North Sea off Orfordness, Suffolk. She was on a voyage from South Shields, County Durham to London.
Venus	United Kingdom	The schooner was driven ashore in a hurricane at Trinidad.

=== 13 August ===
List of shipwrecks: 13 August 1810
Ship	State	Description
Abo	United Kingdom	The ship was driven ashore and severely damaged at Liverpool, Lancashire. She was on a voyage from Lerwick, Shetland Islands to Liverpool.
Bristol	United Kingdom	The ship was driven ashore at Liverpool. She was on a voyage from Liverpool to New York, United States. Bristol was later refloated.
Effort	United Kingdom	The ship was driven ashore and wrecked at Portland, Dorset. Her crew were rescued. She was on a voyage from Topsham, Devon to Sunderland, County Durham.
Maria Antonio	Portugal	The ship was driven ashore at Liverpool. She was on a voyage from Liverpool to Madeira, then Tenerife, Canary Islands. Maria Antonio was later refloated.
Oriana	United Kingdom	The ship was driven ashore at Spital, Northumberland. She was on a voyage from Pictou, Nova Scotia, British North America to Newcastle upon Tyne, Northumberland. She was refloated.
Pitt	United Kingdom	The ship was driven ashore at Liverpool. She was on a voyage from Dominica to Liverpool. Pitt was later refloated.
Pocahuntus	United Kingdom	The ship was driven ashore at Liverpool. She was on a voyage from Liverpool to New York. Pocahuntus was later refloated.
Simon Taylor	United Kingdom	The ship was driven ashore at Liverpool. She was on a voyage from Liverpool to Jamaica. Simon Taylor was later refloated.
Venus	United States	The ship was driven ashore near Liverpool. She was later refloated. Venus was on a voyage from Wiscasset, Maine, to Liverpool.

=== 15 August ===
List of shipwrecks: 15 August 1810
Ship	State	Description
Atalanta	United Kingdom	The ship departed from the River Plate for an English port. No further trace, presumed foundered with the loss of all hands.
Elizabeth & Peggy	United Kingdom	The sloop was driven ashore at Sunderland, County Durham with the loss of all four crew.
William & Ann	United Kingdom	The sloop was driven ashore at Sunderland. Her crew were rescued.

=== 16 August ===
List of shipwrecks: 16 August 1810
Ship	State	Description
John	United Kingdom	The ship was driven ashore and wrecked near Whitby, Yorkshire. Her crew were rescued.

=== 17 August ===
List of shipwrecks: 17 August 1810
Ship	State	Description
Fanny	United Kingdom	The ship foundered in the Mediterranean Sea off the coast of Algeria with the loss of all on board. She was on a voyage from Malta to Bristol, Gloucestershire.

=== 20 August ===
List of shipwrecks: 20 August 1810
Ship	State	Description
HMS Lively	Royal Navy	The fifth-rate frigate ran aground at Point Coura, Malta. Her crew survived. She was declared a total loss in September.

=== 22 August ===
List of shipwrecks: 22 August 1810
Ship	State	Description
Elizabeth and Margaret	United Kingdom	The galiot was wrecked at Ardrossan, Ayrshire with the loss of nine or ten lives. There were five survivors. She was on a voyage from Dublin to Glasgow, Renfrewshire.

=== 23 August ===
List of shipwrecks: 23 August 1810
Ship	State	Description
HMS Magicienne	Royal Navy	HMS Magicienne. Napoleonic Wars, Battle of Grand Port: The Magicienne-class frigate ran aground at Grand Port, Isle de France. She was scuttled by her crew to prevent her being captured by the French Navy.
HMS Sirius	Royal Navy	HMS Sirius. Napoleonic Wars, Battle of Grand Port: The fifth-rate frigate ran aground at Grand Port. She was set afire and destroyed by her crew on 25 August.

=== 26 August ===
List of shipwrecks: 26 August 1810
Ship	State	Description
Triton	United Kingdom	The ship departed from Figueira da Foz, Portugal for Madeira. No further trace, presumed foundered in the Atlantic Ocean with the loss of all hands.

=== 29 August ===
List of shipwrecks: 29 August 1810
Ship	State	Description
Ancona	United States	The ship departed from New Providence, New Jersey, for New Orleans, Louisiana Territory. No further trace, presumed foundered with the loss of all hands.

=== 30 August ===
List of shipwrecks: 30 August 1810
Ship	State	Description
Sally	United States	The ship departed New Providence, New Jersey, for Mobile, Mobile District. No further trace, presumed foundered with the loss of all hands.

=== 31 August ===
List of shipwrecks: 31 August 1810
Ship	State	Description
Amelia	United Kingdom	Wrecked on Crebawethan in the Isles of Scilly while carrying coffee, cotton, rum, sugar and silver dollars from Demerara to London. Her crew were rescued.
Union	United Kingdom	The ship was wrecked on Tybee Island, Georgia, United States. She was on a voyage from Jamaica to Charleston, South Carolina, United States.

=== Unknown date ===
List of shipwrecks: Unknown date in August 1810
Ship	State	Description
Adventure	United Kingdom	The ship was wrecked on Barbuda. She was on a voyage from Lancaster, Lancashire to Saint Thomas, Virgin Islands.
Alpha	United Kingdom	The brig departed from Jamaica for Greenock, Renfrewshire. She was subsequently wrecked at sea, probably with the loss of all hands. The wreck was discovered at 43°43′N 36°02′W on 4 November by Sally Ann (United Kingdom). Alpha arrived at Greenock on 2 December.
Dryade	United Kingdom	The ship was lost in St Mary's Bay, Newfoundland, British North America with the loss of two of her crew.
Eleanor	United Kingdom	The ship was wrecked at Liverpool, Lancashire. She was on a voyage from Liverpool to Saint Lucia.
Engineer	United Kingdom	The ship was run down and sunk in the North Sea off Orfordness, Suffolk. She was on a voyage from Leeds, Yorkshire to London.
George	United Kingdom	The ship departed from Saint Kitts for Greenock. No further trace, presumed foundered with the loss of all hands.
Indian	United Kingdom	The ship foundered in the North Sea.
Porcupine	United States	The ship departed New York for Saint Thomas, Virgin Islands. No further trace, presumed foundered with the loss of all hands.
Thomas	United Kingdom	The ship departed from Quebec City for London. No further trace, presumed foundered with the loss of all hands.
Triton	United Kingdom	The ship foundered whilst of a voyage from Campeche, Spanish Honduras to Jamaica.
Unnamed	Spain	War of the Fifth Coalition: The schooner was captured and sunk in the Caribbean Sea by the privateer Maria (France.
Unnamed	Flag unknown	War of the Fifth Coalition: The ship was captured by a French privateer. She was run ashore and wrecked. She was on a voyage from Campeche to Kingston, Jamaica.

== September ==
=== 1 September ===
List of shipwrecks: 1 September 1810
Ship	State	Description
Governor Heslop	United Kingdom	The ship departed from Liverpool, Lancashire. No further trace, presumed foundered with the loss of all hands.
Hannah	United Kingdom	The transport ship was lost in Montego Bay, Jamaica. Her crew were rescued.
Mary	United Kingdom	The ship was lost near The Mumbles, Glamorgan with the loss of all but four of her crew. She was on a voyage from Demerara to Bristol, Gloucestershire.
William	United Kingdom	The ship foundered in the Atlantic Ocean. Her crew were rescued by Happy Return (United Kingdom). William was on a voyage from Belfast, County Antrim to New York, United States.

=== 5 September ===
List of shipwrecks: 5 September 1810
Ship	State	Description
Hope	United Kingdom	The ship departed from Quebec City, Lower Canada, British North America for Porto, Portugal. No further trace, presumed foundered with the loss of all hands.
Ocean	United Kingdom	The ship was sighted off Pulo Sapatam, Netherlands East Indies in a typhoon. No further trace, presumed foundered with the loss of all hands. She was on a voyage from Dutch Malacca to China.

=== 6 September ===
List of shipwrecks: 6 September 1810
Ship	State	Description
Jane	United Kingdom	The transport ship was lost near Marstrand, Sweden.
Two unnamed vessels	United Kingdom	The transport ships were driven ashore and wrecked on Anholt, Denmark.
Unnamed	Denmark	The ship foundered off Christiania, Norway with the loss of all hands.

=== 7 September ===
List of shipwrecks: 7 September 1810
Ship	State	Description
Sally	United Kingdom	The ship was driven ashore and wrecked at Breaksea Point, Glamorgan. She was on a voyage from Liverpool, Lancashire to Bristol, Gloucestershire

=== 8 September ===
List of shipwrecks: 8 September 1810
Ship	State	Description
Dispatch	United Kingdom	The schooner capsized whilst on a voyage from New York, United States to Gibraltar.

=== 10 September ===
List of shipwrecks: 10 September 1810
Ship	State	Description
Penelope	United Kingdom	The ship was lost near St. Ives, Cornwall. Her crew were rescued. She was on a voyage from St. Ives to Swansea, Glamorgan.
Rhine	United Kingdom	The ship was wrecked at Wilmington, Delaware, United States. Her crew were rescued.
Unnamed	United Kingdom	The sloop sank in the Humber near Barton-upon-Humber with the loss of all three people on board.

=== 11 September ===
List of shipwrecks: 11 September 1810
Ship	State	Description
Fanny	United Kingdom	The Swansea brig was lost in a gale the day after she left Hayle, Cornwall for Wales. Parts of the vessel washed up near Hayle.
USS Gunboat No. 159	United States Navy	The gunboat sank in Chesapeake Bay with all thirteen hands.

=== 14 September ===
List of shipwrecks: 14 September 1810
Ship	State	Description
Denurge Johan Joak	Denmark	The brig was destroyed by fire off the Isles of Scilly, United Kingdom. Her crew were rescued. She was on a voyage from Malta to Plymouth, Devon, United Kingdom.
Favourite	United Kingdom	The ship was lost in the River Plate.
Two unnamed vessels	Hanover	The ships were drive ashore and wrecked at Archangelsk, Russia.
Unnamed	Hamburg	The ship was driven ashore and wrecked at Archangelsk.
Unnamed	Denmark	The ship was driven ashore and wrecked at Archangelsk.
Unnamed	United States	The ship was driven ashore and wrecked at Archangelsk.
25 Unnamed vessels	Flags unknown	The ships were driven ashore and wrecked at Archangelsk.

=== 16 September ===
List of shipwrecks: 16 September 1810
Ship	State	Description
William Penn	United States	The ship was lost whilst on a voyage from Philadelphia, Pennsylvania, to Madeira.

=== 18 September ===
List of shipwrecks: 18 September 1810
Ship	State	Description
Penelope	United Kingdom	The ship stranded near St Ives, Cornwall and became a total loss while bound for Swansea from St Ives.
William	United Kingdom	The ship was driven ashore on the south coast of Cuba with the loss of two of her crew. She was on a voyage from Quebec City, Lower Canada, British North America to Jamaica.

=== 19 September ===
List of shipwrecks: 19 September 1810
Ship	State	Description
Lady Carlton	United Kingdom	The ship was driven ashore at Belfast, County Antrim. She was on a voyage from Guadeloupe to Belfast.

=== 20 September ===
List of shipwrecks: 20 September 1810
Ship	State	Description
Bear	United Kingdom	The ship foundered whilst on a voyage from North America to Berwick upon Tweed.
Duke of Kent	United Kingdom	The ship sprang a leak and was abandoned in the Atlantic Ocean (37°46′N 62°04′W). Her crew were rescued by HMS Lavinia (Royal Navy). Duke of Kent was on a voyage from Port-au-Prince, Haiti to London.
Schemer	United Kingdom	The ship was lost near the Turks Islands. She was on a voyage from Haiti to London.

=== 21 September ===
List of shipwrecks: 21 September 1810
Ship	State	Description
Don (Дон)	Imperial Russian Navy	The transport ship, coming from Galați, was driven ashore in the mouth of a distributary of the Chilia branch of the Danube. Her crew survived. The ship was covered by sediment.

=== 22 September ===
List of shipwrecks: 22 September 1810
Ship	State	Description
Boston	United Kingdom	The sloop was in collision with a collier and foundered in the North Sea off Cromer, Norfolk. She was on a voyage from Rochester, Kent to Sunderland, County Durham.
Sally	United States	The ship was wrecked on the coast of New Jersey. She was on a voyage from Tönningen, Duchy of Holstein to the Isle of Man and New York.

=== 23 September ===
List of shipwrecks: 23 September 1810
Ship	State	Description
Princess Mary	United Kingdom	The ship was lost near Newfoundland, British North America. Her crew were rescued.

=== 24 September ===
List of shipwrecks: 24 September 1810
Ship	State	Description
Crown	United Kingdom	The ship foundered in the Grand Banks of Newfoundland. Her crew took to the boats. They were rescued on 28 September by Isabella and Dorothy (United Kingdom). Crown was on a voyage from Portsmouth, Hampshire to Halifax, Nova Scotia, British North America.
Juno	United Kingdom	The ship was driven ashore on the coast of the United States.. She was on a voyage from Liverpool, Lancashire to Boston, Massachusetts, United States.

=== 25 September ===
List of shipwrecks: 25 September 1810
Ship	State	Description
Findon	United Kingdom	The ship was driven ashore "near Louth, Lincolnshire". She was on a voyage from Ramsgate, Kent to Newcastle upon Tyne, Northumberland.
Williams	United Kingdom	The ship foundered in the Atlantic Ocean. Her crew were rescued by Tryal (United Kingdom). Williams was on a voyage from Quebec City, Lower Canada, British North America to Greenock, Renfrewshire.

=== 26 September ===
List of shipwrecks: 26 September 1810
Ship	State	Description
Only Son	United Kingdom	The ship sprang a leak and was abandoned in the Atlantic Ocean. Her crew were rescued by Almira (Portugal). Only Son was on a voyage from Liverpool to Philadelphia, Pennsylvania.

=== 27 September ===
List of shipwrecks: 27 September 1810
Ship	State	Description
Dos Amigos	Flag unknown	The sloop was driven ashore and wrecked at Aux Cayes, Haiti in a hurricane.
Elambeau	Haitian Navy	The brig of war was driven ashore and wrecked at Aquin in a hurricane.
Ellen	United Kingdom	The ship was driven ashore at Aux Cayes in a hurricane.
Indian Queen	United Kingdom	The brig was driven ashore wrecked at Jérémie, Haiti in a hurricane.
Mary	United States	The brig was driven ashore and wrecked at Jérémie in a hurricane.
Mary	United States	The schooner was driven ashore and wrecked at Jérémie in a hurricane.
Phœbe	Flag unknown	The schooner was driven ashore and wrecked at Aux Cayes.
Triumph	United States	The schooner was driven ashore and wrecked at Jérémie in a hurricane.
More than sixteen unnamed vessels	Republic of Haiti	The ships were driven ashore and wrecked at Jérémie in a hurricane.
Several unnamed vessels	Republic of Haiti	The ships were driven ashore and wrecked at Aux Cayes in a hurricane.

=== 28 September ===
List of shipwrecks: 28 September 1810
Ship	State	Description
Don Amejos	Haiti	The sloop was driven ashore and wrecked at Jérémie in a hurricane.
Fox	United Kingdom	The ship was driven ashore and wrecked on Île Amsterdam. Some of her crew were rescued on 28 April 1811 by Rose (United States). Eight crew were left on the island.
Lady Mitchell	United Kingdom	The ship departed from Quebec, British North America. No further trace, presumed foundered with the loss of all hands.
Phœbe	United Kingdom	The schooner was driven ashore and wrecked at Jérémie in a hurricane.

=== 29 September ===
List of shipwrecks: 29 September 1810
Ship	State	Description
Diana	United Kingdom	The ship was abandoned in the Atlantic Ocean. Her crew were rescued by William (United Kingdom). Diana was on a voyage from Plymouth, Devon to Quebec City, Lower Canada, British North America.
Minerva	United States	The ship was wrecked on the American coast. Her crew were rescued. She was on a voyage from Charleston, South Carolina, to Saint Croix, Virgin Islands.

=== 30 September ===
List of shipwrecks: 30 September 1810
Ship	State	Description
Three Brothers	United States	The ship was driven ashore and wrecked at Nassau, Bahamas. Her crew were rescued. She was on a voyage from Havana, Cuba to New Providence, New Jersey.

=== Unknown date ===
List of shipwrecks: Unknown date in September 1810
Ship	State	Description
Ann	United Kingdom	The ship was driven ashore in the Bay of Fundy. She was on a voyage from Quebec City, British North America to Jamaica.
Fame	United Kingdom	The ship was driven ashore and wrecked 2 nautical miles (3.7 km) from Weymouth, Dorset. She was on a voyage from Sunderland, County Durham to Weymouth.
Harper	United Kingdom	The galiot was driven ashore in Stackpole Bay. She was on a voyage from Liverpool, Lancashire to Limerick.
Invention	United Kingdom	The ship was lost on the English Bank, in the River Plate in late September with the loss of all but fourteen of her crew.
Lion	United Kingdom	The ship was run down and sunk by Favourite (United Kingdom) 11 leagues (33 nautical miles (61 km)) west of the Isles of Scilly. Her crew were rescued by Favourite. Lion was on a voyage from London to Gibraltar.
Lovely Lass	United Kingdom	The ship was driven ashore crewless on the coast of North Carolina, United States. She was on a voyage from New Orleans, Louisiana Territory to London.
Maria	United Kingdom	The ship was wrecked off Rathlin Island, County Antrim. Her crew were rescued. She was on a voyage from Liverpool to Londonderry.
Mariner	United Kingdom	The ship was driven ashore near Aberdeen. She was on a voyage from Quebec City, Lower Canada, British North America to London.
Messmate	United Kingdom	The ship sank at Liverpool. She was on a voyage from Liverpool to Greenock, Renfrewshire.
Nei of Novit	(United Kingdom of Great Britain and Ireland) Guernsey	The ship was lost off the Cape Verde Islands. She was on a voyage from Guernsey to the Cape Verde Islands and Brazil.
New Hope	United Kingdom	The ship was driven ashore near Scarborough, Yorkshire. She was refloated in early October and taken in to Scarborough.
Nicholson	United Kingdom	The ship ran aground and was severely damaged at Liverpool. She was on a voyage from Pernambuco, Brazil to Liverpool.
Rose	United Kingdom	The ship was driven ashore in the Bay of Fundy.
Schemer	United Kingdom	The ship foundered off the Turks Islands. Her crew were rescued. She was on a voyage from Haiti to London.
Weddal	United Kingdom	The ship was driven ashore at Flamborough Head, Yorkshire. She was refloated and take in to Bridlington for repairs.
Unnamed	France	War of the Fifth Coalition: The brig was captured at Morbihan, Finistère by HMS Surveillante (Royal Navy). On her passage to England, she lost her main mast and became unmanagable. She was destroyed.
Unnamed	Portugal	War of the Fifth Coalition: The ship was captured by the privateer brig Edward (France and was sunk.

== October ==
=== 1 October ===
List of shipwrecks: 1 October 1810
Ship	State	Description
Dash	United States	The ship sprang a leak and was abandoned by her crew. She was on a voyage from Saint Croix, Virgin Islands to Wilmington, Delaware.

=== 2 October ===
List of shipwrecks: 2 October 1810
Ship	State	Description
Alexander	United Kingdom	The ship was lost at the mouth of the Kennebec River, Maine, United States.
Deito Feito	Portugal	Napoleonic Wars: The ship was captured and scuttled by a French privateer. She was on a voyage from Madeira to Guernsey, Channel Islands. Deito Feito was later found at sea by HMS Scylla (Royal Navy) and taken in to Plymouth, Devon, United Kingdom.

=== 3 October ===
List of shipwrecks: 3 October 1810
Ship	State	Description
Neptune	United Kingdom	Napoleonic Wars: The ship was captured and burnt by the privateer Confiance (France). Neptune was on a voyage from Lisbon, Portugal to Falmouth, Cornwall.

=== 7 October ===
List of shipwrecks: 7 October 1810
Ship	State	Description
Dolores	Spain	The ship arrived at the Isles of Scilly, United Kingdom. No further trace.

=== 9 October ===
List of shipwrecks: 9 October 1810
Ship	State	Description
Hawke	United Kingdom	The three-masted schooner foundered in the English Channel off Beachy Head, Sussex with the loss of all hands. She was on a voyage from London to an African port.
Pomona	United Kingdom	The ship was abandoned in Whitesand Bay. She was later reboarded and taken in to Plymouth, Devon. Pomona was on a voyage from Waterford to Dartmouth, Devon.
Robert and Mary	United Kingdom	The ship departed from Charleston, South Carolina, United states for Liverpool, Lancashire. No further trace, presumed foundered in the Atlantic Ocean with the loss of all hands.
Two Brothers	United Kingdom	The ship was driven ashore and wrecked at Great Yarmouth, Norfolk.

=== 10 October ===
List of shipwrecks: 10 October 1810
Ship	State	Description
Aprece	Danzig	The ship was wrecked on the Whiting Sand, in the North Sea off Orford, Suffolk, United Kingdom.
Courage	Danzig	The ship was wrecked on the Whiting Sand.
Destiny	United States	The ship was lost in Santa Cruz Bay, Tenerife.
Magdalena	Russia	The ship, which had been detained by HMS Hero (Royal Navy), was driven ashore and wrecked at Great Yarmouth, Norfolk, United Kingdom.
New Castle	United Kingdom	The ship was driven ashore and sank at Blackwall, Middlesex. She was on a voyage from South Shields, County Durham to London.

=== 11 October ===
List of shipwrecks: 11 October 1810
Ship	State	Description
Charles	United States	The ship was wrecked in the Hudson River.

=== 12 October ===
List of shipwrecks: 12 October 1810
Ship	State	Description
Unnamed	United Kingdom	The hoy was driven ashore and wrecked near Theddlethorpe, Lincolnshire. Her crew were rescued.

=== 13 October ===
List of shipwrecks: 13 October 1810
Ship	State	Description
Curaçoa Packet	United Kingdom	The ship departed from Curaçao for London. No further trace, presumed foundered with the loss of all hands.

=== 14 October ===
List of shipwrecks: 14 October 1810
Ship	State	Description
Twa Broder	Flag unknown	Gunboat War: The ship was captured by a Danish privateer. She was run ashore and burnt.

=== 15 October ===
List of shipwrecks: 15 October 1810
Ship	State	Description
Amelia	United States	The ship foundered. Her crew were rescued. She was on a voyage from Gothenburg, Sweden to Boston, Massachusetts.
Two Brothers	United Kingdom	The collier was wrecked on the Stoney Binks, in the North Sea off County Durham. Her crew were rescued.

=== 16 October ===
List of shipwrecks: 16 October 1810
Ship	State	Description
Flora	United Kingdom	The ship sank at Southwold, Suffolk. Her crew were rescued.

=== 17 October ===
List of shipwrecks: 17 October 1810
Ship	State	Description
Anfang	Danzig	The ship ran aground on the Whiting Sand, in the North Sea off Great Yarmouth, Norfolk, United Kingdom. She was refloated and taken in to Harwich, Essex, United Kingdom in a waterlogged condition.
Apries	Danzig	The ship was wrecked on the Whiting Sand. Her crew were rescued.
Blossom	United Kingdom	The brigantine was wrecked on the Busey Sand, in the North Sea off the coast of Essex. Her crew were rescued. She was on a voyage from Aberdeen to London.
Ceres	United States	The ship was abandoned in the Atlantic Ocean. She was on a voyage from Charleston, South Carolina, to Madeira.
Dolores	Spain	The ship departed from the Isles of Scilly, United Kingdom for London. No further trace, presumed foundered with the loss of all hands.
Phœnix	United Kingdom	The ship was holed by her anchor and sank in Bowling Bay. She was on a voyage from the Clyde to Limerick.
Unnamed	Flag unknown	The galiot was wrecked on the Whiting Sand with the loss of all hands.

=== 19 October ===
List of shipwrecks: 19 October 1810
Ship	State	Description
Bon Aventure	United Kingdom	The ship sailed from Chaleur Bay for Cork. No further trace, presumed foundered with the loss of all hands.
Britannia	United Kingdom	The sloop struck a sunken wreck and sank between Harwich, Essex and Orfordness, Suffolk with the loss of three of her five crew. She was on a voyage from London to Boston, Lincolnshire.
Isabella	Spain	The schooner was lost near Tralee, County Kerry, United Kingdom. She was on a voyage from Tenerife, Canary Islands to London
Milford	United Kingdom	The ship was driven ashore at Whitstable, Kent. She was on a voyage from Milford Haven, Pembrokeshire to London.
Nancy	United Kingdom	The ship struck a sunken wreck and sank between Harwich and Orfordness. She was on a voyage from London to Boston.
Somnus, or Somnanbule	France	Somnus and HMS Apelles Napoleonic Wars: The privateer was captured and sunk in the English Channel off Dieppe, Seine-Inférieure by HMS Apelles (Royal Navy).

=== 20 October ===
List of shipwrecks: 20 October 1810
Ship	State	Description
George	United Kingdom	The ship was lost near Amelia Island, East Florida, New Spain. She was on a voyage from Liverpool, Lancashire to Amelia Island.
Good Citizen	United Kingdom	Napoleonic Wars: The ship was captured and burnt off Samaná, Santo Domingo by a French privateer. She was on a voyage from New Brunswick, British North America to Jamaica.
Hanover	United Kingdom	The ship was lost near Amelia Island. She was on a voyage from Liverpool to Amelia Island.
Hiram	United Kingdom	The ship sprang a leak and was abandoned in the North Sea 13 leagues (39 nautical miles (72 km)) south east by east of Flamborough Head, Yorkshire. She was on a voyage from Newcastle upon Tyne, Northumberland to Gibraltar.
Peter	United Kingdom	The ship was captured by the privateer Josephine (France). She was sent in to Gravelines, Nord but foundered in the North Sea off that port.

=== 21 October ===
List of shipwrecks: 21 October 1810
Ship	State	Description
Lavinia	United Kingdom	The ship was lost near St. Andrews, New Brunswick, British North America with the loss of a crew member.
Louisa	United States	The ship was abandoned in the Atlantic Ocean.
Three Thomas's	United Kingdom	The ship foundered in the Atlantic Ocean. Her crew took to a boat and were rescued on 7 November in the Grand Banks of Newfoundland by Friendship (United Kingdom). Three Thomas's was on a voyage from London to New York, United States.

=== 22 October ===
List of shipwrecks: 22 October 1810
Ship	State	Description
Ann	United Kingdom	The ship foundered in the English Channel off Boulogne, Pas-de-Calais, France with the loss of four of her crew. She was on a voyage from Quebec City, Lower Canada, British North America to Sheerness, Kent.
Ann	United Kingdom	The ship was abandoned in the Atlantic Ocean off Cape Clear Island, County Cork. Her crew were rescued by Charles and Maria (United Kingdom). Ann was on a voyage from North America to Whitehaven, Cumberland. She subsequently came ashore and was wrecked near Land's End, Cornwall
Clyde	United Kingdom	The ship was driven ashore at Patrington, Yorkshire. She was on a voyage from Hull, Yorkshire to New York, United States. Clyde was later refloated and taken in to Hull for repairs.
Fly	United Kingdom	The ship was lost near the Old Head of Kinsale, County Cork. She was on a voyage from Liverpool, Lancashire to Africa.
John	United Kingdom	The ship was lost near Liverpool. Her crew were rescued. She was on a voyage from New York to Liverpool.
Queen	United Kingdom	The ship was driven ashore near Kidwelly, Carmarthenshire. She was on a voyage from Quebec City to London.
Tart	United Kingdom	The ship capsized and foundered off St Anns Head, Pembrokeshire with the loss of all hands.
Union	United Kingdom	The ship was driven ashore near Kidwelly. She was on a voyage from Cádiz, Spain to London.

=== 23 October ===
List of shipwrecks: 23 October 1810
Ship	State	Description
Adeline	United Kingdom	The ship was driven ashore and damaged at Liverpool, Lancashire. She was on a voyage from Virginia, United States to Liverpool. Adeline was subsequently refloated.
Amphion	United Kingdom	Napoleonic Wars: The ship was captured by the privateer Savage (France). She was sent in to Calais but foundered in the English Channel off that port.
Asphalon	United Kingdom	Napoleonic Wars: The ship was captured by the privateer Savage (France). She was sent in to Calais by was lost going into that port. Asphalon was on a voyage from Quebec City, Lower Canada, British North America to Woolwich, Kent.
Ceres	United Kingdom	The transport ship was wrecked at Heligoland.
Mermaid	United Kingdom	Napoleonic Wars: The ship was captured off North Foreland, Kent by the lugger privateer Messina (France). She was recaptured by HMS Bloodhound (Royal Navy) but was subsequently run ashore near Calais, France. Mermaid was on a voyage from Quebec to London.
Venus	Heligoland	The schooner was wrecked at Heligoland.
Unnamed	Flag unknown	The ship was wrecked in the Isles of Scilly, United Kingdom.

=== 24 October ===
List of shipwrecks: 24 October 1810
Ship	State	Description
Convention	United States	The ship was lost on Abaco. She was on a voyage from New York to Havana, Cuba.
Julius Caesar	United Kingdom	Napoleonic Wars: The ship was captured by the privateer Subtle (France) whilst on a voyage from New York, United States to London. She was sent in to Dunkirk, Nord, but foundered in the North Sea off that port.
St. Patrick	United Kingdom	The ship foundered in the English Channel off Calais, France. Her crew, and that of Texel (United Kingdom), which she had rescued previously, were rescued but made prisoners. St. Patrick was on a voyage from Newcastle upon Tyne, Northumberland to Guernsey, Channel Islands.

=== 25 October ===
List of shipwrecks: 25 October 1810
Ship	State	Description
African	United States	The ship was lost on the coast of East Florida, New Spain. She was on a voyage from Havana, Cuba to New York.
Caroline	United Kingdom	The ship was lost on the coast of East Florida. She was on a voyage from New Orleans, Louisiana Territory to Liverpool, Lancashire.
Helena	United Kingdom	The ship was driven onto the Hock, in the Bristol Channel. She was on a voyage from New Orleans to Liverpool.
Jane and Sarah	United Kingdom	The ship was run down and sunk. Her crew were rescued by Clothier (United States).
Triton	United States	The ship was lost on the coast of East Florida. She was on a voyage from Havana to Richmond, Virginia.
Union	Spain	The ship was lost on the coast of East Florida. She was on a voyage from Havana to London, United Kingdom.

=== 26 October ===
List of shipwrecks: 26 October 1810
Ship	State	Description
Anne	United States	The ship was driven ashore on the coast of East Florida, New Spain and wrecked. She was on a voyage from Havana, Cuba to Baltimore, Maryland.
Cabinet	United Kingdom	The ship was wrecked on the Florida Reef. She was on a voyage from New Orleans, Louisiana Territory to Liverpool, Lancashire.

=== 27 October ===
List of shipwrecks: 27 October 1810
Ship	State	Description
Ann	United Kingdom	The ship was wrecked in the Berry Islands. Her crew were rescued. She was on a voyage from Saint Domingo to Bristol, Gloucestershire.

=== 28 October ===
List of shipwrecks: 28 October 1810
Ship	State	Description
Little John	United Kingdom	The ship was run down and sunk off Great Yarmouth, Norfolk. Her crew were rescued.
Orion	United States	The ship was wrecked on Pelican Key with the loss of four of her crew. She was on a voyage from Philadelphia, Pennsylvania, to Havana, Cuba.

=== 30 October ===
List of shipwrecks: 30 October 1810
Ship	State	Description
Good Hope	United Kingdom	The ship was lost at "St. Salvador". Her crew were rescued. She was on a voyage from London to Baltimore, Maryland, United States.
Leeds	United Kingdom	The ship was driven ashore and wrecked at Liverpool, Lancashire. She was on a voyage from Rio de Janeiro, Brazil to Liverpool.

=== 31 October ===
List of shipwrecks: 31 October 1810
Ship	State	Description
Cheesman	United Kingdom	The ship was wrecked on Læsø, Denmark.

=== Unknown date ===
List of shipwrecks: Unknown date in October 1810
Ship	State	Description
Britannia	United Kingdom	The ship was lost near Orfordness, Suffolk. Her crew were rescued. She was on a voyage from London to Boston, Lincolnshire.
Caroline	United Kingdom	The ship ran aground in the River Thames at Blackwall, Middlesex and was severely damaged. She was on a voyage from Saint Kitts to London.
HMS Castilian	Royal Navy	The sloop of war was wrecked off Boulogne, Pas-de-Calais, France. Her crew were rescued.
David Scott	United Kingdom	The ship foundered. she was on a voyage from Malta to an English port.
Friendship	United States	The ship was driven ashore and wrecked at Havana, Cuba between 23 and 26 October.
Hannah	United Kingdom	The ship foundered off the coast of Cuba. Her crew were rescued. She was on a voyage from New Orleans, Louisiana Territory to an English port.
Heart of Oak	United Kingdom	The ship was lost in the St. Lawrence River. Her crew were rescued.
La Desirée	French Navy	The corvette was wrecked on the coast of Madagascar with the loss of 78 of her 114 crew. The survivors were taken as slaves by the natives.
Maria	United Kingdom	The ship was lost in the Saint Lawrence River before 25 October.
Mercurius	United Kingdom	The ship was wrecked on the coast of Sweden.
New Success	United Kingdom	The ship driven ashore near Ouessant, Finistère, France in late October. She was on a voyage from Dungarvan, County Waterford to Weymouth, Dorset. New Success was subsequently taken possession of by the French.
Osiride	United Kingdom	The ship was driven ashore at Fishguard, Pembrokeshire. She was on a voyage from Maranhão, Brazil to Liverpool, Lancashire. Osiride was either later refloated and taken in to Fishguard, or was wrecked.
Penguin	United Kingdom	The ship was wrecked near Fishguard, Pembrokeshire. She was on a voyage from Lisbon, Portugal to Newfoundland, British North America.
President von Ingeraleben	United States	The ship ran aground at Nassau, Bahamas and was severely damaged. She was declared a total loss. President von Ingeralebwn was on a voyage from Amelia Island, New Spain to Portsmouth, New Hampshire.
HMS Racer	Royal Navy	The cutter was driven ashore on the French coast in late October. Her crew were rescued.
St Joze Diligente	Portugal	The ship was lost near Madeira. She was on a voyage from Lisbon to Madeira and Baltimore, Maryland, United States.
Swift	United Kingdom	The ship was wrecked at Porto, Portugal.
Texel	United Kingdom	The ship foundered on or before 24 October. Her crew were rescued by St. Patrick (United Kingdom). Texel was on a voyage from Newcastle upon Tyne to Great Yarmouth.
Union	United Kingdom	The ship was wrecked on the Cefn Sidan sands, in the Bristol Channel off the coast of Carmarthenshire with the loss of all hands. She was on a voyage from London to Cádiz, Spain.
Venta	United Kingdom	The ship foundered whilst on a voyage from Malta to a British port with the loss of her captain.
Washington	United Kingdom	The ship was lost in the St. Lawrence River. Her crew were rescued.

== November ==
=== 1 November ===
List of shipwrecks: 1 November 1810
Ship	State	Description
Anna Margaretta	Sweden	The ship was wrecked on the Galloper Sand, in the North Sea with the loss of all but one of her crew.
Columbia	United Kingdom	The ship was wrecked near Sandy Hook, New Jersey, United States. She was on a voyage from Dublin to New York, United States.
Elizabeth Ann	United States	The schooner was lost on Abaco.
Humber	United Kingdom	The smack was wrecked in the Farne Islands, Northumberland. She was on a voyage from Leith, Lothian to Hull, Yorkshire.
Lady Mitchell	United Kingdom	The ship was wrecked at sea and was abandoned. Eight crew were rescued by HMS Dragon (Royal Navy). Lady Mitchell was on a voyage from Halifax, Nova Scotia, British North America to Liverpool, Lancashire.
Northumberland	United Kingdom	The packet ship sprang a leak and foundered in the North Sea off Whitby, Yorkshire. Her four crew survived.
Prince Henry	United Kingdom	The ship was driven ashore and wrecked at Happisburgh, Norfolk with the loss of all hands.
Thomas	United Kingdom	The ship was driven ashore at Great Yarmouth, Norfolk. Her crew were rescued. She was on a voyage from London to Hull.
Union	United Kingdom	The ship was driven ashore and wrecked at Great Yarmouth. Her crew were rescued.
Unnamed	United Kingdom	The collier was driven ashore and wrecked at Great Yarmouth. Her crew were rescued.

=== 2 November ===
List of shipwrecks: 2 November 1810
Ship	State	Description
Anne	United Kingdom	The brig, a collier, was driven ashore and wrecked at Mundesley, Norfolk with the loss of all hands.
Industry	United Kingdom	The ship foundered in the North Sea off Robin Hood's Bay, Yorkshire.
James and William	United Kingdom	The ship was lost near Wexford. She was on a voyage from Arklow, County Wicklow to Dublin.
John's Adventure	United Kingdom	The ship foundered in the North Sea off Blakeney, Norfolk with the loss of all hands. She was on a voyage from South Shields, County Durham to London.
Nelly	United Kingdom	Napoleonic Wars: The ship was wrecked on a rock in the English Channel off Bexhill-on-Sea, Sussex whilst trying to evade a French privateer.
Northumberland Packet	United Kingdom	The ship sprang a lead and foundered in the North Sea off Whitby, Yorkshire. Her crew were rescued.
Palomo	Spanish Navy	The brig was driven ashore and wrecked at the Ria de Vivero, on the north coast of Spain with the loss of about 700 lives. There were nine survivors.
Santa Maria Magdalena	Spanish Navy	The fifth rate frigate collided with HMS Narcissus (Royal Navy) and was subsequently driven ashore and wrecked at the Ria de Vivero.
Unnamed	United Kingdom	The sloop was driven ashore and wrecked at Trimingham, Norfolk. Her crew were rescued.

=== 3 November ===
List of shipwrecks: 3 November 1810
Ship	State	Description
Alexander	United Kingdom	The ship was driven ashore at Great Yarmouth, Norfolk. Her crew were rescued.
Drontheim	(Denmark) Norway	The ship was lost near Donaghadee, County Down, United Kingdom. Her crew were rescued.
Eliza	United Kingdom	The ship was driven ashore at Great Yarmouth. Her crew were rescued.
Elliot	United Kingdom	The ship was driven ashore at Great Yarmouth. Her crew were rescued. She was on a voyage from Great Yarmouth to South Shields, County Durham.
Jenopher	United Kingdom	The sloop out from Youghal, County Cork for Poole, Dorset foundered 6 nautical miles (11 km) off Mousehole, Cornwall with the loss of a crew member. Two others were reported to have been rescued by John and Elizabeth (United Kingdom). Also recorded as being lost in Penzance Bay / Mount's Bay.
Orbit	United Kingdom	The ship was wrecked on the Hoyle Bank, in Liverpool Bay. She was on a voyage from New York, United States to Liverpool, Lancashire.
Prince William Henry	United Kingdom	The ship was driven ashore at Happisburgh, Norfolk with the loss of all but one of her crew.
Sisters	United Kingdom	The ship was driven ashore at Wells-next-the-Sea, Norfolk with the loss of all but one of her crew.
Union	United Kingdom	The ship was driven ashore at Great Yarmouth. Her crew were rescued.
Unnamed	United Kingdom	The brig was wrecked on the Seven Stones, off the coast of Cornwall. Her crew survived. She was on a voyage from Cork to Falmouth, Cornwall.
Unnamed	United Kingdom	The fishing boat capsized off the coast of Norfolk with the loss of at least two lives.
Unnamed	United Kingdom	The brig foundered off Lowestoft, Suffolk with the loss of all hands.

=== 4 November ===
List of shipwrecks: 4 November 1810
Ship	State	Description
Johns	United Kingdom	The ship was wrecked on Anticosti Island, British North America. Her crew were rescued. She was on a voyage from Quebec City, British North America to Liverpool, Lancashire.
Perseverance	(United Kingdom of Great Britain and Ireland) New South Wales	The brig capsized at Campbell's Island in the Torres Strait with the loss of four of her crew.

=== 5 November ===
List of shipwrecks: 5 November 1810
Ship	State	Description
William and Sally	United Kingdom	The ship was driven ashore at Lowestoft, Suffolk. She was later refloated and taken in to Great Yarmouth, Norfolk.

=== 6 November ===
List of shipwrecks: 6 November 1810
Ship	State	Description
Falmouth	United Kingdom	The ship departed from Plymouth, Devon for London. No further trace, presumed foundered with the loss of all hands.

=== 7 November ===
List of shipwrecks: 7 November 1810
Ship	State	Description
Reward	United Kingdom	The Exeter brig was lost on the Seven Stones Reef while bound from Limerick with a cargo of oats and butter. She was on a voyage from Limerick to London.

=== 8 November ===
List of shipwrecks: 8 November 1810
Ship	State	Description
Diamond	United Kingdom	The ship was driven ashore at Newhaven, Sussex. She was later refloated.
Mary	United Kingdom	The ship was wrecked at Graciosa, Azores, Portugal.
Prosperous	United Kingdom	The ship foundered in the English Channel off Chichester, Sussex with the loss of all hands.
Saltcoats	United Kingdom	The ship was lost near Saltcoats, Ayrshire.

=== 9 November ===
List of shipwrecks: 9 November 1810
Ship	State	Description
Brittania	United Kingdom	The ship sank in the Bristol Channel off The Mumbles. Her crew survived. She was on a voyage from Swansea, Glamorgan to Waterford. Brittania was refloated in April 1811 and offered for sale.
Brunswick	United Kingdom	The ship was driven ashore and wrecked on São Miguel Island, Azores.
Castor	United Kingdom	The ship was driven ashore and wrecked near Londonderry. She was on a voyage from Charleston, South Carolina, to Greenock, Renfrewshire
Estella	Portugal	The ship was driven ashore in a capsized state in the Hamoaze.
Mae	United Kingdom	The ship sprang a leak and was abandoned in the Atlantic Ocean (39°46′N 58°00′W). Her crew were rescued by Julia and Mary (United Kingdom).
HMS Mandarin	Royal Navy	The gun-brig was wrecked on Red Island, Singapore. Her crew survived.
Swift	United Kingdom	The ship was driven ashore and wrecked on São Miguel Island with the loss of all hands.
Union	United Kingdom	The collier was run down and sunk in the North Sea off Cromer, Norfolk by Albion (United Kingdom) with the loss of all hands.
United Sisters	United Kingdom	The ship was driven ashore and wrecked on São Miguel Island.
Whitehaven Lass	United Kingdom	The ship departed from British Honduras for Liverpool, Lancashire. No further trace, presumed foundered with the loss of all hands.
Zephyr	United Kingdom	The ship was driven ashore and wrecked on São Miguel Island.

=== 10 November ===
List of shipwrecks: 10 November 1810
Ship	State	Description
Abeona	United Kingdom	The ship was driven ashore and wrecked at Saltfleet, Lincolnshire. Her crew survived. She was on a voyage from Waterford to Hull, Yorkshire.
Adeona	United Kingdom	The transport ship was driven ashore and wrecked near Saltfleet.
Acorn	United Kingdom	The ship was driven ashore at King's Lynn, Norfolk. She was on a voyage from King's Lynn to London.
Agaitha	United Kingdom	The ship was driven ashore and wrecked at Grimsby, Lincolnshire. She was on a voyage from Riga, Russia to London.
Aid	United Kingdom	The ship was driven ashore and wrecked on the Lincolnshire coast between Grainthorpe and Sutton-on-Sea.
Ambler	United Kingdom	The ship was wrecked on the Herring Sand, in the North Sea, with the loss of all hands. She was on a voyage from London to Boston, Lincolnshire. She was later refloated and brought in to Boston.
Amity	United Kingdom	The ship was driven ashore and wrecked at Snettisham, Norfolk. Her twelve crew were rescued. She was on a voyage from London to Hull.
Ann	United Kingdom	The ship was driven ashore and wrecked at Fosdyke, Lincolnshire.
Ann and Isabella	United Kingdom	The ship was driven ashore and wrecked on the Lincolnshire coast between Grainthorpe and Sutton-on-Sea.
Apollo	United Kingdom	The ship was driven ashore at Whitby, Yorkshire. She was later refloated and taken in to Whitby for repairs.
Arethusa	United Kingdom	The ship was driven ashore and severely damaged at Whitby. Her crew were rescued. She was refloated on 12 November and taken in to Whitby.
Autumn	United Kingdom	The brig was wrecked on the Pye Sand, in the North Sea off Harwich, Essex with the loss of all hands.
Aws	Russia	The ship was driven ashore and wrecked at Grimbsy.
Beckford	United Kingdom	The ship was driven onto the Stoney Binks, in the North Sea off the coast of County Durham and was damaged. She was later refloated.
Betsey	United Kingdom	The ship was driven ashore and wrecked at Sutton-on-Sea. She was on a voyage from Newcastle upon Tyen, Northumberland to London.
Brothers	United Kingdom	The ship was driven ashore and wrecked at Eccles-on-Sea, Norfolk with the loss of all hands.
Cardigan	United Kingdom	The ship was driven ashore near Padstow, Cornwall. She was on a voyage from Bristol, Gloucestershire to Carmarthen.
Catharina and Isabella	United Kingdom	The ship was driven ashore at King's Lynn. She was on a voyage from Sunderland, County Durham to King's Lynn. Catherina and Isabella was later refloated and taken in to King's Lynn.
Cincinnati	United States	The ship was driven ashore near New York.
City of Aberdeen	United Kingdom	The ship was driven ashore and wrecked at Great Coates, Lincolnshire.
Commerce	United Kingdom	The ship was driven ashore and wrecked on the Holderness coast, Yorkshire. Her crew were rescued.
Dorothy	United Kingdom	The ship was driven ashore and wrecked on the Lincolnshire coast between Grainthorpe and Sutton-on-Sea.
Dove	United Kingdom	The Southampton sloop foundered with the loss of all hands at Studland Roads, Dorset while en route from London to Weymouth.
Duck	United Kingdom	The ship was driven ashore and wrecked at Padstow. She was on a voyage from St. Agnes, Cornwall to Newport, Monmouthshire.
Echo	United Kingdom	The ship was driven ashore at Corton, Suffolk. Her crew were rescued. She was on a voyage from London to North Shields, Northumberland.
Friendship	United Kingdom	The ship foundered in the North Sea off Wells-next-the-Sea, Norfolk. Her crew were rescued. She was on a voyage from Wick, Caithness to London.
Friendship	United Kingdom	The ship was driven ashore at King's Lynn. She was on a voyage from London to King's Lynn. Friendship was refloated in December and taken in to King's Lynn.
Fortunatus	United Kingdom	The sloop was wrecked at Wisbech, Cambridgeshire.
Garland	United Kingdom	The ship was driven ashore and wrecked at Sutton-on-Sea.
Good Agreement	United Kingdom	The ship was driven ashore at Great Yarmouth, Norfolk. Her crew were rescued.
Good Intent	United Kingdom	The ship was driven ashore and wrecked at Great Yarmouth. Her crew were rescued. She was on a voyage from Hull to London.
Hannah and Mary	United Kingdom	The ship was driven ashore and wrecked on the Holderness coast. Her crew were rescued.
Henry	United Kingdom	The ship was driven ashore at Southwold, Suffolk. Her crew were rescued.
Hope	United Kingdom	The brig foundered in The Wash off Boston, Lincolnshire with the loss of all hands.
Industry	United Kingdom	The ship was driven ashore at Great Yarmouth. Her crew were rescued. She was on a voyage from Hull to London.
Iroquois	United Kingdom	The ship was driven ashore and wrecked at Grimsby. She was on a voyage from South Shields to London.
Jane and Mary	United Kingdom	The ship was driven ashore at St. Ives, Cornwall. She was later refloated.
John	United Kingdom	The ship was driven ashore and wrecked at Saltfleet.
John and George	United Kingdom	The ship was driven ashore and wrecked on the Lincolnshire coast between Grainthorpe and Sutton-on-Sea.
John and Mary	United Kingdom	The ship was driven ashore near Padstow. She was on a voyage from London to Barnstaple, Devon.
Joseph & Dorothea	United Kingdom	The ship was driven ashore and wrecked on the Lincolnshire coast between Grainthorpe and Sutton-on-Sea.
Juno	France	The privateer was lost near Saint-Malo, Ille-et-Vilaine.
Lady Petre	United Kingdom	The ship was driven ashore at Great Yarmouth.
Liberty	United Kingdom	The ship was driven ashore and wrecked on the Lincolnshire coast between Grainthorpe and Sutton-on-Sea.
Lord Egremont	United Kingdom	The ship was driven ashore at Great Yarmouth.
Lovely Cruizer	United Kingdom	The ship was lost at St. Ives, Cornwall with the loss of two of her crew.
Margaret	United Kingdom	The ship was driven ashore and wrecked at Stallingborough, Lincolnshire with the loss of all hands. She was on a voyage from Wells-next-the-Sea, Norfolk to Hull.
Margaret	United Kingdom	The ship was lost near Cherbourg, Seine-Inférieure, France. Twelve of her crew were rescued. She was on a voyage from Saint Domingo to London.
Maria	United Kingdom	The ship was driven ashore at Corton. Her crew were rescued. She was on a voyage from Newcastle upon Tyne, Northumberland to London.
Mary	United Kingdom	The ship was driven ashore and wrecked near Sheerness, Kent.
Mary	United Kingdom	The ship was driven ashore and wrecked on the Lincolnshire coast between Grainthorpe and Sutton-on-Sea.
Mary and Eleanor	Stettin	The ship was driven ashore and wrecked on the Lincolnshire coast between Grainthorpe and Sutton-on-Sea.
Matthew	United Kingdom	The ship was driven ashore and wrecked on the Lincolnshire coast between Grainthorpe and Sutton-on-Sea.
Nancy	United Kingdom	The ship was driven ashore on the Holderness coast. Her crew were rescued. Nancy was refloated in late December and taken in to Bridlington, Yorkshire.
Norwegian Lass	Denmark–Norway	The privateer, a schooner, which had been captured by HMS Nymphe (Royal Navy), was wrecked at Berwick-upon-Tweed, Northumberland. All eleven crew were rescued.
Palafox	United Kingdom	The ship was driven ashore at Great Yarmouth. Her crew were rescued. She was refloated in December and taken in to Great Yarmouth.
Polly	United Kingdom	The ship was driven ashore and wrecked at Whitby.
Prosperous	United Kingdom	The sloop was foundered in the English Channel off Chichester, Sussex with the loss of all hands. She was on a voyage from Emsworth, Hampshire to Newhaven, Sussex.
Providence	United Kingdom	The ship was driven ashore and wrecked at Winterton-on-Sea, Norfolk with the loss of all hands.
Resolution	United Kingdom	The ship was driven ashore at Whitby. Her crew were rescued. Resolution was later refloated and taken in to Whitby for repairs.
Retford	United Kingdom	The ship was driven ashore near Boston, Lincolnshire.
Robert's Advernture	United Kingdom	The ship was driven ashore and wrecked on the Holderness coast with the loss of three lives.
Salamander	United Kingdom	The ship was driven on shore on the coast of Lincolnshire between Theddlethorpe and Tetney.
Sally	United Kingdom	The ship was driven ashore and wrecked at Whitby. Her crew were rescued.
Sally	United Kingdom	The ship was driven ashore and wrecked at Great Yarmouth. Her crew were rescued. She was on a voyage from Hull to Colchester, Essex.
Sally	United Kingdom	The ship was driven ashore at Benacre, Suffolk. Her crew were rescued.
Sarah	United Kingdom	The ship was wrecked on the Holderness coast. Her crew were rescued.
Selby	United Kingdom	The ship was driven ashore and wrecked at Whitby. Her crew were rescued.
Sophia	Russia	The ship was driven ashore and wrecked at Grimsby.
Sophia's Daughter	United Kingdom	The ship was driven ashore and wrecked at Grimsby.
South Esk	United Kingdom	The ship was driven ashore and wrecked on the coast of Lincolnshire between Grainthorpe and Sutton-on-Sea.
Supply	United Kingdom	The ship was driven ashore and wrecked on the coast of Lincolnshire between Grainthorpe and Sutton-on-Sea.
Susannah	United Kingdom	The ship was driven ashore and wrecked on the Holderness coast. Her crew were rescued.
Sutton	United Kingdom	The ship was driven ashore at Orford, Suffolk with the loss of all hands. She was on a voyage from Hull to London.
Sylph	United Kingdom	The ship was driven ashore and wrecked at Corton. Her crew were rescued. She was on a voyage from Sunderland to London.
Thetis	Sweden	The ship was driven ashore and wrecked at Grimsby. She was on a voyage from Gävle to Bristol, Gloucestershire, United Kingdom.
Triton	United Kingdom	Captain Wilson's ship was driven ashore and wrecked at Theddlethorpe. She was on a voyage from Sunderland to London.
Triton	United Kingdom	The ship was driven ashore and wrecked on the Lincolnshire coast between Grainthorpe and Sutton-on-Sea.
Union	United Kingdom	The ship was wrecked in The Wash off King's Lynn with the loss of all hands.
Valentine	United Kingdom	The ship was driven ashore and wrecked at Saltfleet with the loss of all hands.
Wilhelm Ludwig	Stettin	The galiot was driven ashore and wrecked near Patrington, Yorkshire. She was on a voyage from Stettin to Hull.
Yare	United Kingdom	The ship was driven ashore and wrecked on the Lincolnshire coast between Grainthorpe and Sutton-on-Sea.
Yarmouth	United Kingdom	The ship was driven ashore and wrecked at Whitby. Her crew were rescued.
Yathen	United Kingdom	The ship was driven ashore at Gorleston, Suffolk.
Young Rolliff	Prussia	The ship was driven ashore and wrecked on the Holderness coast. She was on a voyage from Königsberg to Hull.
Unnamed	United Kingdom	Paisley canal disaster: While the canal boat was docked in the Glasgow, Paisley and Johnstone Canal in Renfrewshire, Scotland, and discharging passengers, people wishing to board for her next trip became anxious to get aboard and rushed her. In the ensuing crush of people, some fell off the pier and drowned and the canal boat capsized, drowning over 60 other people trapped aboard her. A total of 84 people died. The canal boat was righted a week later.
Unnamed	United Kingdom	The ship was driven ashore and wrecked at Bawdsey, Suffolk.
Two unnamed vessels	United Kingdom	The ships sank off Theddlethorpe.
Unnamed	Flag unknown	The ship was driven ashore near Friskney, Lincolnshire.
Unnamed	United Kingdom	The schooner capsized off the coast of Lincolnshire with the loss of all three hands.
Unnamed	United Kingdom	The coble capsized at Sunderland with the loss of both crew.
Unnamed	United Kingdom	War of the Fifth Coalition: The ship was captured by the French. She was run ashore near L'Orient, Morbihan, France. She was on a voyage from London to the West Indies.
Thirteen unnamed vessels	France	The ships were driven ashore and wrecked at Caen, Calvados.

=== 11 November ===
List of shipwrecks: 11 November 1810
Ship	State	Description
Autumn	United Kingdom	The brig was wrecked on the Pye Sand, in the North Sea off Harwich, Essex with the loss of all hands.
La Modeste	Denmark	The ship, a prize of HMS Hussar (Royal Navy), was driven ashore and wrecked north of Wainfleet, Lincolnshire, United Kingdom. Her crew survived.
Rover	United Kingdom	The ship was driven ashore at Ryde, Isle of Wight. She was on a voyage from Liverpool, Lancashire to London.

=== 12 November ===
List of shipwrecks: 12 November 1810
Ship	State	Description
L'Amazon	French Navy	The 44-gun frigate was driven ashore at Saint-Vaast-la-Hougue, Manche in an action with HMS Diana and HMS Niobe (both Royal Navy) and was wrecked.
L'Elize	French Navy	The frigate was driven ashore at Saint-Vaast-la-Hougue in an action with HMS Diana and HMS Niobe (both Royal Navy) and was wrecked.

=== 13 November ===
List of shipwrecks: 13 November 1810
Ship	State	Description
Dispatch	United Kingdom	The ship was driven ashore at Charlestown, Cornwall.

=== 14 November ===
List of shipwrecks: 14 November 1810
Ship	State	Description
Amazone	French Navy	Napoleonic Wars: The Iphigénie-class frigate was driven ashore between Havre de Grâce and Cherbourg, Seine-Inférieure by HMS Diana, HMS Donegal, HMS Niobe and HMS Revenge (all Royal Navy).
Crore	Sweden	The ship was driven ashore near Great Yarmouth, Norfolk, United Kingdom. Her crew were rescued.
Élisa	French Navy	Napoleonic Wars: The Pallas-class frigate was driven ashore between Havre de Grâce and Cherbourg by HMS Diana, HMS Donegal, HMS Niobe and HMS Revenge (all Royal Navy).
Exact	United Kingdom	The ship was driven ashore near King's Lynn, Norfolk.
Indefatigable	United Kingdom	The ship sank at Beaumaris, Anglesey. She was on a voyage from Liverpool, Lancashire to Plymouth, Devon.
Mary Ann	United Kingdom	The ship sprung a leak off the Lizard and tried to make Falmouth, Cornwall but overshot. She headed for Plymouth, dropped anchor in Whitsand Bay, Cornwall and was driven ashore and wrecked with the loss of a crew member. She was carrying bale goods, coffee, sugar and wine from her home port of London to Malta.
Mercury	United Kingdom	The ship was driven ashore at Beaumaris, Anglesey. She was later refloated.
Providence	United Kingdom	The ship was driven ashore at Beaumaris.
Rambler	United Kingdom	The ship was wrecked off Saint Tudwal's Islands, Caernarfonshire with the loss of eleven of her thirteen crew. She was on a voyage from New York to Liverpool, Lancashire.
Susannah	United Kingdom	The ship was driven ashore at Beaumaris.
Warren Bulkeley	United Kingdom	The ship was driven ashore at Beaumaris. She was later refloated.

=== 15 November ===
List of shipwrecks: 15 November 1810
Ship	State	Description
San Ramon	Flag unknown	The ship was lost in Mount's Bay. She was on a voyage from "Saloe" to Plymouth, Devon, United Kingdom.

=== 16 November ===
List of shipwrecks: 16 November 1810
Ship	State	Description
Barbier de Seville	France	Napoleonic Wars: The privateer was sunk in the English Channel off Calais in an engagement with HMS Phipps (Royal Navy). Her 65 crew were rescued.
Chesterfield	United Kingdom	The ship was driven ashore and damaged near Cork. She was on a voyage from Douglas, Isle of Man to São Miguel Island, Azores.
Clio	United Kingdom	The brig was wrecked on Loe Bar while carrying a cargo of barilla from the Azores. The captain and mate drowned but the three remaining crew survived. An alternative account gives the loss of all the crew and cargo of barilla and wine, while en route from Tenerife to London.
De Jonge Fedde	Hanover	The galiot was driven ashore and wrecked on North Ronaldsay, Orkney Islands, United Kingdom. Her crew were rescued. She was on a voyage from Memel, Prussia to Dublin, United Kingdom.
Friendship	United Kingdom	The ship was lost near Wexford with the loss of all but one of her crew.
James	United Kingdom	The ship was driven ashore at Duncannon, County Waterford with the loss of all but one of her crew. She was on a voyage from Liverpool, Lancashire to Limerick.
Lord Nelson	United Kingdom	The brig was discovered crewless off the Mull of Galloway, Ayrshire.
New Augusta	United Kingdom	The ship was driven ashore near Castletown, County Wexford. Her crew were rescued. She was on a voyage from Portsmouth, Hampshire to Dungarvan, County Waterford.
Princess Royal	United Kingdom	The brig was driven ashore crewless near Tramore, County Waterford.
Sans Ramon	Spain	All the crew of the brig were drowned as she came ashore on Loe Bar, Cornwall. Most of her cargo of wine was salvaged and sold at the Star Inn, Marazion on 2 September 1811.

=== 17 November ===
List of shipwrecks: 17 November 1810
Ship	State	Description
Ambler	United Kingdom	The ship ran aground on the Herring Sand, in the North Sea off the coast of Norfolk with the loss of all hands. She later refloated herself and was taken in to Boston, Lincolnshire.
Ambulator	United Kingdom	The ship was driven ashore at Mountbatten, Plymouth, Devon. She was on a voyage from Porto, Portugal to London.
Downshire Packet	United Kingdom	The ship was lost north of Port Patrick, Wigtownshire.

=== 18 November ===
List of shipwrecks: 18 November 1810
Ship	State	Description
Duchess of York	United Kingdom	The full-rigged ship ran aground on the Goodwin Sands during a voyage from London to Rio de Janeiro, Viceroyalty of the Río de la Plata. Boats from Ramsgate refloated her.
Modeste	United States	The full-rigged ship, a prize of HMS Hussar (Royal Navy), was driven ashore and wrecked north of Wainfleet, Lincolnshire, United Kingdom.

=== 19 November ===
List of shipwrecks: 19 November 1810
Ship	State	Description
Aurora	United Kingdom	The ship was wrecked at sea with the ultimate loss of eight of her twelve crew. Survivors were rescued on 2 December by Maida (United Kingdom). Aurora was on a voyage from Quebec City, Lower Canada, British North America to Portsmouth, Hampshire.
Christina Margaretta	Sweden	The ship was lost near Gotland.
HMS Eagle	Royal Navy	The Repulse-class ship of the line ran aground at Port Mahon, Minorca, Spain. She was refloated and found to be severely leaky.

=== 20 November ===
List of shipwrecks: 20 November 1810
Ship	State	Description
Concord	United Kingdom	(first report): The ship was stranded and became a total loss on Lundy Island in the Bristol Channel while heading for Dublin from the Baltic Sea. Her crew were rescued.
Maria	Sweden	The ship was lost at Skagen, Denmark. She was on a voyage from Gothenburg to London, United Kingdom.

=== 21 November ===
List of shipwrecks: 21 November 1810
Ship	State	Description
Acorn	United Kingdom	The ship was driven ashore near Marazion, Cornwall. She was on a voyage from Shoreham-by-Sea, Sussex to Tenby, Pembrokeshire. Acorn was refloated on 25 November.

=== 23 November ===
List of shipwrecks: 23 November 1810
Ship	State	Description
Economic	Flag unknown	The ship, which had been detained by HMS Starling (Royal Navy) was driven ashore and wrecked north of Great Yarmouth, Norfolk, United Kingdom.
Grenada	Flag unknown	The ship was bound for Plymouth, Devon with a cargo of wine. She was wrecked near Porthleven, Cornwall.
Phœnix	United Kingdom	The ship was driven ashore near Ilfracombe, Devon. She was on a voyage from Porto, Portugal to Bristol, Gloucestershire. Phœnix was refloated on 4 December and taken in to Bristol.

=== 25 November ===
List of shipwrecks: 25 November 1810
Ship	State	Description
Mary	United Kingdom	The ship was wrecked on The Needles, Isle of Wight. Her crew were rescued. She was on a voyage from Guernsey, Channel Islands to Portsmouth, Hampshire.
Minerva	United Kingdom	The ship sprang a leak and was abandoned in the Atlantic Ocean. She was on a voyage from the Bay of Fundy to Glasgow, Renfrewshire.
Two Sisters	United Kingdom	The ship was lost near Abaco. She was on a voyage from "St Mary" to Nassau, Bahamas.

=== 26 November ===
List of shipwrecks: 26 November 1810
Ship	State	Description
Aurora	United Kingdom	The ship foundered off Cork Head, County Cork. Her crew were rescued. She was on a voyage from London to Amelia Island, East Florida, New Spain.
Betsey	United Kingdom	The ship was driven ashore and wrecked near Newry, County Antrim. She was on a voyage from Beaumaris, Anglesey to Cork.
Good Friends	United Kingdom	The ship was driven ashore at Salterton, Devon. She was on a voyage from Plymouth to Exeter, Devon.
Gute Hoffnung	Flag unknown	The ship was driven ashore near Gosport, Hampshire, United Kingdom. She was on a voyage from London to Lisbon, Portugal.
Lord Nelson	United Kingdom	The packet boat foundered in the English Channel off Start Point, Devon. Six of her 24 crew were rescued by Rebecca (United Kingdom); the other eighteen took to the long boat but were drowned. Lord Nelson was on a voyage from London to Lisbon.
New Delight	United Kingdom	The ship was driven ashore near Newry. She was on a voyage from Greenock, Renfrewshire to Cork.
Princess Augusta	United Kingdom	The ship was wrecked off Saint Thomas, Virgin Islands. Her crew survived.
Prudentiana	Russia	The ship was driven ashore at St Andrews, Fife, United Kingdom.
Severn	United Kingdom	The ship ran aground in Rocky Bay, County Cork. She was on a voyage from Bristol, Gloucestershire to Saint Vincent.
Widdecombe	United Kingdom	The ship was wrecked on the Mare Rocks, off Exmouth, Devon. Her crew were rescued. She was on a voyage from Exeter to Dartmouth, Devon.

=== 27 November ===
List of shipwrecks: 27 November 1810
Ship	State	Description
Active	United Kingdom	The ship was driven ashore and wrecked near Poole, Dorset.
Dorchester	United Kingdom	The ship was driven ashore on Cape Breton Island, British North America and was wrecked.
Mary and Elizabeth	United Kingdom	The ship was wrecked on The Shingles, off the Isle of Wight with the loss of a crew member. She was on a voyage from Plymouth, Devon to London.
Susan and Sarah	United Kingdom	The ship ran aground and was wrecked at Wilmington, Delaware, United States. She was on a voyage from Liverpool, Lancashire to Wilmington.

=== 28 November ===
List of shipwrecks: 28 November 1810
Ship	State	Description
Dorchester	United Kingdom	The ship was driven ashore in the Saint Lawrence River and was damaged. She was on a voyage from Quebec City, Lower Canada, British North America to Bermuda. Dorchester was consequently declared a constructive total loss.
Hamilton Moore	United Kingdom	The ship was wrecked on Læsø, Denmark.

=== 29 November ===
List of shipwrecks: 29 November 1810
Ship	State	Description
Eliza	United Kingdom	The ship was driven ashore in Bigbury Bay. Her crew were rescued.
Liberté	France	Napoleonic Wars: The privateer foundered with the loss of 27 of her crew following an engagement with Friendship (United Kingdom), which was captured.
Providentia	United Kingdom	The ship was lost near Varberg, Sweden.
Prudence	Sweden	The ship foundered off Varberg.

=== 30 November ===
List of shipwrecks: 30 November 1810
Ship	State	Description
Good Friends	United Kingdom	(first report): While en route from Plymouth to Exeter she was driven onto Salterton Beach, Devon. All the crew and cargo were saved.
Maria	United Kingdom	The ship sprang a leak and foundered in the Atlantic Ocean (15°15′N 5°15′W). She was on a voyage from Lisbon, Portugal to London.
Mary		While sailing for Portsmouth from Guernsey she was stranded on The Needles, Isle of Wight
Mary & Elizabeth	United Kingdom	One boy drowned when the ship was a total loss on The Shingles, off Lymington, Hampshire. She was en route from Plymouth to London.
Severn	United Kingdom	The ship was abandoned in the Atlantic Ocean (49°31′N 10°40′W). The packet Windsor Castle rescued the crew. (United Kingdom). Severn was on a voyage from Quebec, Lower Canada, British North America to Greenock, Renfrewshire.
Widdecome	United Kingdom	(first report): The crew was saved when the ship became a total loss on ″Mare Rocks″ (Maer Rocks), Exmouth, Devon. She was en route from Exeter to Dartmouth, Devon.

=== Unknown date ===
List of shipwrecks: Unknown date in November 1810
Ship	State	Description
Amity	United Kingdom	The ship was lost near Theddlethorpe, Lincolnshire.
Brilliant	United Kingdom	The ship was wrecked at Vigo, Spain. Her crew were rescued. She was on a voyage from Porto, Portugal to Liverpool, Lancashire.
Britannia	United Kingdom	The ship foundered in the Bristol Channel off The Mumbles, Glamorgan. She was on a voyage from Swansea, Glamorgan to Waterford.
Cæsar	United Kingdom	The ship was wrecked near Aberdeen with the loss of all hands in late November.
Carlton	United Kingdom	The ship was wrecked on Tory Island, County Donegal. She was on a voyage from Lough Swilly to Liverpool, Lancashire
Catharine	United Kingdom	The ship was driven ashore at Liverpool. she was on a voyage from Liverpool to Wilmington, Delaware, United States.
Christina	Duchy of Holstein	The ship foundered in the North Sea off Great Yarmouth, Norfolk, United Kingdom of Great Britain and Ireland. Her eight crew survived. She was on a voyage from Hull, Yorkshire, United Kingdom to Tönningen.
Cincinnatus	United States	The ship was lost near Boston, Massachusetts in early November. Her crew were rescued. She was on a voyage from Saint Petersburg, Russia to Boston.
HMS Conflict	Royal Navy	The gun-brig foundered off the north coast of Spain on or after 9 November. Her crew were rescued.
Daphne	United States	The ship departed from Philadelphia, Pennsylvania, for Cádiz, Spain. No further trace, presumed foundered with the loss of all hands.
Diana	United Kingdom	The ship was wrecked at Beaumaris, Anglesey. She was on a voyage from Limerick to Liverpool.
Drie Gebroeders	France	The ship was lost on the Dutch coast.
Elizabeth	United Kingdom	The ship was driven ashore near Sunderland, County Durham.
Flora	United Kingdom	The transport ship foundered in the Irish Sea off Cork with the loss of fifteen of her crew. Three survivors were rescued by a sloop from Wexford.
Friendschaft	Flag unknown	The brig was driven ashore and wrecked at Harwich, Essex United Kingdom.
George and Ann	United Kingdom	The ship was wrecked on the coast of Norfolk. She was on a voyage from Berwick upon Tweed to London.
Haabet	Flag unknown	The ship foundered in the Kattegat.
Harriet & John	United Kingdom	The 69 ton sloop came ashore in the Isles of Scilly.
Jonge Temple	Prussia	The ship was driven ashore and wrecked on the Holderness coast, Yorkshire.
Laurentius and Elizabeth	Denmark–Norway	The ship was driven ashore and wrecked at Heacham, Norfolk, United Kingdom.
Leander	United Kingdom	Napoleonic Wars: The ship was captured by a French privateer on 1 November. She was sent into Tréguier, Côtes du Nord but foundered in the Bay of Inset. Leander was on a voyage from London to British Honduras.
London Packet	United Kingdom	The ship was run down and sunk in the English Channel by the East Indiaman Cambrian (United Kingdom). Her crew were rescued. She was on a voyage from Bridport, Dorset to London.
Margaret	United Kingdom	The ship was lost near Wexford. She was on a voyage from Havana, Cuba to Greenock, Renfrewshire.
Margery	United Kingdom	The ship was wrecked on the Nore. Her crew were rescued.
Maria	United Kingdom	The ship was wrecked near Roscarberry, County Cork with the loss of all hands. She was on a voyage from London to Limerick.
Olympus	United States	The ship foundered off Wilmington, Delaware. She was on a voyage from Plymouth, Massachusetts, to Wilmington.
Olympus	United Kingdom	The ship was abandoned off New Providence, New Jersey. She was on a voyage from New Orleans, Louisiana Territory to an English port.
Queen of Naples	United Kingdom	The ship was driven ashore at Vigo. Her crew were rescued. She was on a voyage from Porto to London. Queen of Naples was refloated in late December.
Rosina	United Kingdom	The ship was driven ashore and wrecked in Ballyrattan Bay, County Cork.
Sea Venture	United Kingdom	The ship was driven ashore and wrecked at Holbeach, Lincolnshire. Her crew survived. She was over 100 years old and trading between London and Whitby, Yorkshire.
Shark	United Kingdom	The ship was lost near Happisburgh, Norfolk.
Sirius	United Kingdom	The ship was driven ashore on the Holderness coast, Yorkshire.
Sisters	United Kingdom	The ship was lost near Cape Finisterre, Spain. She was on a voyage from Gibraltar to London.
Three Friends	United Kingdom	The ship was driven ashore near Boston, Massachusetts in early November. Her crew were rescued. She was on a voyage from Liverpool to Boston.
Three Friends	Flag unknown	The vessel was lost in the vicinity of "Squan Beach," a term used at the time for the coast of New Jersey near Manasquan and sometimes for the 7-mile (11 km) stretch of coast between Manasquan Inlet and Cranberry Inlet or for the entire coast of New Jersey between Sea Girt and Barnegat Inlet.
Tigre	United Kingdom	The ship was driven ashore near Yarmouth, Isle of Wight. She was on a voyage from London to Plymouth, Devon.
Triton	United Kingdom	The ship was lost near Aveiro, Portugal. Her crew were rescued. She was on a voyage from London to Lisbon, Portugal.
Union	United Kingdom	The ship was wrecked at Pembrey, Carmarthenshire with some loss of life.
Vigilant	United Kingdom	The ship was lost near Aldeburgh, Suffolk.
Virtumnus	United Kingdom	The ship was driven ashore near East Looe, Cornwall. She was on a voyage from South Shields, County Durham to Gibraltar. Virtumnus was later refloated.
Vrow Elina	Prussia	The ship was wrecked on the coast of Essex. Her crew were rescued.
Two unnamed vessels	France	War of the Fifth Coalition: The privateers were sunk off Læsø, Denmark by HMS Ruby (Royal Navy).

== December ==
=== 1 December ===
List of shipwrecks: 1 December 1810
Ship	State	Description
Fanny	United Kingdom	The ship foundered in the Irish Sea off Tara Hill, County Wexford. She was on a voyage from Dublin to Cork.

=== 2 December ===
List of shipwrecks: 2 December 1810
Ship	State	Description
Heart of Oak	United Kingdom	The ship departed from Halifax, Nova Scotia, British North America for an English port. No further trace, presumed foundered in the Atlantic Ocean with the loss of all hands.

=== 3 December ===
List of shipwrecks: 3 December 1810
Ship	State	Description
Aurora	United Kingdom	The barque was abandoned in the Atlantic Ocean. Her crew were rescued by Maida (United Kingdom). Aurora was on a voyage from Quebec City, British North America to London.
George	United Kingdom	The ship was driven ashore in the Orkney Islands. She was on a voyage from Dublin to London. George was later refloated and taken in to Burghead, Moray for repairs.

=== 4 December ===
List of shipwrecks: 4 December 1810
Ship	State	Description
Eliza	United Kingdom	(first report): The Teignmouth ship was stranded and a total loss in Bigbury Bay, Devon. She was out of Prince Edward Island, British North America.

=== 5 December ===
List of shipwrecks: 5 December 1810
Ship	State	Description
HMS Plumper	Royal Navy	The gun-brig ran aground in the Saint Lawrence River and was reported to have been lost. She was only damaged.
William	United Kingdom	The ship was driven ashore and wrecked in the Orkney Islands. She was on a voyage from Newfoundland, British North America to Leith, Lothian.

=== 8 December ===
List of shipwrecks: 8 December 1810
Ship	State	Description
Clio	United Kingdom	Napoleonic Wars: The ship was captured by the French while on a voyage from London to Philadelphia, Pennsylvania, United States. She was subsequently wrecked on the coast of Brittany, France.
Surry	United Kingdom	The ship was wrecked at Falmouth, Jamaica with the loss of six of her crew. She was on a voyage from London to British Honduras.

=== 10 December ===
List of shipwrecks: 10 December 1819
Ship	State	Description
Fernando VII	Spanish Navy	The Santa Ana-class ship of the line foundered off Béjaïa, Ottoman Algeria. Her crew survived.

=== 11 December ===
List of shipwrecks: 11 December 1810
Ship	State	Description
Betsey	United States	The ship was abandoned in the Atlantic Ocean. She was on a voyage from Virginia to Lisbon, Portugal.
Clarendon	United Kingdom	The ship was wrecked on Atwood Key and her crew rescued. She was on a voyage from Jamaica to London.
John	United Kingdom	The ship was wrecked near Tynemouth, Northumberland. Her crew were rescued.

=== 12 December ===
List of shipwrecks: 12 December 1810
Ship	State	Description
Anna Catharina	Sweden	The ship was driven ashore and wrecked at Blackpool, Lancashire, United Kingdom. Her crew were rescued. She was on a voyage from Liverpool, Lancashire to Gothenburg.
Hopewell	United Kingdom	The sloop was wrecked west of Rye Harbour, Sussex with the loss of all hands.
Jane and Ann	United Kingdom	The ship was wrecked near Holyhead, Anglesey.
Lightfoot	United Kingdom	The ship was driven ashore in Carnarvon Bay with the loss of her captain. She was on a voyage from the United States to Liverpool, Lancashire.
True Love	United Kingdom	The ship was driven ashore at Blackpool, Lancashire.

=== 13 December ===
List of shipwrecks: 13 December 1810
Ship	State	Description
Commerce	United Kingdom	The ship was lost near Dungeness, Kent. She was on a voyage from London to Exeter, Devon.

=== 14 December ===
List of shipwrecks: 14 December 1810
Ship	State	Description
Isea	United Kingdom	The ship was driven ashore in Dundalk Bay.
Providence	United Kingdom	The ship was lost near Whitby, Yorkshire.
Swallow	United Kingdom	The brig was driven ashore and wrecked at Selsey, Sussex.

=== 15 December ===
List of shipwrecks: 15 December 1810
Ship	State	Description
Duke of York	United Kingdom	The ship was wrecked on Tiree, Inner Hebrides. She was on a voyage from Sligo to the Clyde.
Farmer's Adventure	United Kingdom	The ship was driven ashore near Bideford, Devon. She was on a voyage from Cork to Southampton, Hampshire.
Sally	United Kingdom	The ship departed from Newfoundland, British North America for Waterford. No further trace, presumed foundered in the Atlantic Ocean with the loss of all hands.

=== 16 December ===
List of shipwrecks: 16 December 1810
Ship	State	Description
Prince Erndest	United Kingdom	The ship was driven ashore at Plymouth, Devon. She was on a voyage from Plymouth to Jamaica.

=== 17 December ===
List of shipwrecks: 18 December 1810
Ship	State	Description
Unnamed	France	War of the Fifth Coalition: The privateer was sunk off the Owers Sandbank, in the English Channel in an action with HMS Rinaldo (Royal Navy). Her crew were rescued by a French privateer.

=== 18 December ===
List of shipwrecks: 18 December 1810
Ship	State	Description
Famous Adventure	United Kingdom	(first report): Became stranded and a total loss, near Bideford, Devon while out of Cork for Southampton, Hampshire.
Melampe	Denmark–Norway	HMS Ranger (Royal Navy) captured and sank the privateer in the English Channel off Fécamp, Seine-Inférieure, France.
HMS Nymphe	Royal Navy	The fifth-rate frigate was driven ashore and wrecked at Dunbar, Lothian with the loss of nine of her crew.
HMS Pallas	Royal Navy	The Thames-class frigate was wrecked at Dunbar with the loss of eleven of her fifty-six crew.
Swallow	United Kingdom	The ship was driven ashore and wrecked at Selsey Bill, Sussex. Her crew were rescued. She was on a voyage from Tenerife, Canary Islands, Spain to Newcastle upon Tyne, Northumberland.

=== 19 December ===
List of shipwrecks: 19 December 1810
Ship	State	Description
HMS Satellite	Royal Navy	The Seagull-class brig-sloop foundered in the English Channel off Saint-Vaast-la-Hougue, Manche, France with the loss of all hands.
Providence Endeavour	United Kingdom	The collier was driven ashore and wrecked at Whitby, Yorkshire with the loss of seven of her eight crew.

=== 20 December ===
List of shipwrecks: 20 December 1810
Ship	State	Description
Ceres	United Kingdom	The ship took a pilot on board on this date. No further trace, presumed foundered in Liverpool Bay with the loss of all on board. Ceres was on a voyage from Quebec City, Lower Canada, British North America to Liverpool, Lancashire.
Pearl	United Kingdom	The brig was driven ashore at Aberdeen. She was on a voyage from Sunderland, County Durham to Aberdeen. She was refloated on 23 December and taken in to Aberdeen.
Tynemouth Castle	United Kingdom	The ship ran aground on the Herd Sand, in the North Sea off South Shields, County Durham.

=== 21 December ===
List of shipwrecks: 21 December 1810
Ship	State	Description
Ann	United Kingdom	The ship was wrecked on the Burbo Bank, in Liverpool Bay with the loss of all but one of her crew. She was on a voyage from Eddington, Maine, United States to Liverpool, Lancashire.
Baltic	United Kingdom	The ship was driven ashore and wrecked at Malin, County Donegal. Her crew were rescued.
Brunswick	United Kingdom	The ship was driven ashore at Liverpool. She was on a voyage from Liverpool to Lisbon, Portugal. She was refloated.
Eudora	United States	The ship en route from Norfolk, Virginia, to London, United Kingdom, carrying tobacco leaf wrecked near Efford, Bude, Cornwall, United Kingdom. Some of her fixtures and cargo were salvaged and sold at Bude.
Hart	United Kingdom	The ship was driven ashore in the Clyde.
Hazard	(United Kingdom of Great Britain and Ireland) British North America	The ship was wrecked on Malin Head, County Donegal. Her crew were rescued. She was on a voyage from Liverpool, Lancashire to Newfoundland, British North America or vice versa.
Humming Bird	United States	The ship foundered whilst on a voyage from Port-au-Prince, Haiti to New York.
Nancy	United Kingdom	The ship was wrecked on the Isle of Man with much loss of life. She was on a voyage from Newfoundland to Liverpool.
Oak	United Kingdom	The ship was driven ashore and wrecked in the Clyde.
Orion	United Kingdom	The ship was wrecked at sea. Only her captain survived to be rescued on this date in the Atlantic Ocean (46°43′N 10°41′W) by HMS Niemen (Royal Navy). Orion was on a voyage from New Brunswick, British North America to Maryport, Cumberland.
Price	United Kingdom	Wrecked near Bude Haven, Cornwall while bound for Chichester, Sussex from Waterford with a cargo of beef, butter, lard and oats. A second report says she was driven ashore at her home port of Padstow, Cornwall.
Traveller	United Kingdom	The ship was driven ashore at Hoylake, Lancashire. She was on a voyage from Demerara to Liverpool. Traveller was later refloated.
Union	United Kingdom	The ship was driven ashore near Holyhead, Anglesey. Her crew were rescued.
Unnamed	United Kingdom	The crewless brig was driven ashore near Audierne, Finistère. France.

=== 22 December ===
List of shipwrecks: 22 December 1810
Ship	State	Description
Caravan	United Kingdom	The ship was driven ashore and wrecked at Biddeford, Devon. She was on a voyage from Bangor, County Down to Liverpool, Lancashire.
Elizabeth	United Kingdom	The ship was lost near Liverpool, Lancashire. She was on a voyage from Newfoundland, British North America to Liverpool.
Fortuna	United Kingdom	The ship was lost near Fishguard, Pembrokeshire with the loss of all hands.
HMS Minotaur	Royal Navy	The Wreck of a Transport Ship by J.M.W. Turner, 1810. HMS Minotaur. The Courageux-class ship of the line was wrecked on the Haaks Bank, in the North Sea off Texel, North Holland, French First Republic with the loss of between 370 and 570 lives. One hundred and twenty survivors were taken as prisoners of war.

=== 23 December ===
List of shipwrecks: 23 December 1810
Ship	State	Description
Fox	United States	The ship was wrecked in the Turks Islands. Her crew were rescued. She was on a voyage from New York to Jamaica.

=== 24 December ===
List of shipwrecks: 24 December 1810
Ship	State	Description
Henry	United Kingdom	The transport ship was wrecked at Plymouth, Devon. Her crew were rescued.
Minerva	Spain	The brig struck Brenton's Reef off Newport, Rhode Island, in a storm and sank in 20 feet (6.1 m) of water on the north side of the southernmost part of the reef at 41°26.60′N 071°21.42′W with the loss of 10 lives.

=== 25 December ===
List of shipwrecks: 25 December 1810
Ship	State	Description
Aimwell	United Kingdom	The ship was driven ashore and wrecked at Wexford. Her crew were rescued. She was on a voyage from Lisbon, Portugal to the Clyde.
Daphne	United Kingdom	The ship was driven ashore at Broadstairs, Kent She was on a voyage from London to Cork. Daphne was later refloated and taken in to Broadstairs.
Eagle	United Kingdom	The transport ship was driven ashore and wrecked on the south coast of the Isle of Wight. Her crew were rescued.
Friendship	United Kingdom	The ship was driven ashore at Southsea, Hampshire. She was on a voyage from São Miguel Island, Azores to London. Friendship was later refloated and taken in to Portsmouth, Hampshire.
Headley Grove	United Kingdom	The ship was driven ashore and wrecked at Ramsgate, Kent. She was on a voyage from Portsmouth to London.
Irvin	United Kingdom	The ship was driven ashore near Whitehaven, Cumberland. She was on a voyage from Jamaica to the Clyde. Irvin was later refloated and taken in to Whitehaven.
Linen Hall	United Kingdom	The ship was driven ashore in St Brides Bay, Pembrokeshire. Her crew were rescued. She was on a voyage from Dublin to Cork.
HMS Monkey	Royal Navy	The gun-brig was wrecked off Quiberon, Morbihan, France with the loss of over 57 lives.
Mount Vernon	United Kingdom	The ship was wrecked in Liverpool Bay. Her crew were rescued. She was on a voyage from Wiscasset, Maine, United States to Liverpool.
Piedade	Portugal	The ship was wrecked on the Mouse Sand, in the North Sea. She was on a voyage from Maranhão, Brazil to London.
Sinclair	United Kingdom	The ship was driven ashore on the Sandwich Flats. She was on a voyage from Jamaica to London. Sinclair was later refloated and put into Ramsgate, Kent.
Spartan	United Kingdom	The ship was driven ashore and wrecked at Liverpool. She was on a voyage from New Orleans, Louisiana Territory to Liverpool.
Teresa	United Kingdom	The West Indiaman, a snow, was driven ashore and wrecked at St Donats, Glamorgan with the loss of two of her crew. She was on a voyage from Trinidad to Bristol, Gloucestershire.
Unidentified collier	United Kingdom	(first report): The collier became stranded and a total loss on Bideford Bar in Barnstaple Bay while carrying coal and unspecified cargo.

=== 26 December ===
List of shipwrecks: 26 December 1810
Ship	State	Description
Robert Hale	United States	The ship was driven ashore and wrecked at Caernarfon, United Kingdom. She was on a voyage from Providence, Rhode Island, to Liverpool, Lancashire, United Kingdom.
Ruby	United States	The schooner foundered in the Atlantic Ocean off Charleston, South Carolina.
Zephyr	United Kingdom	The ship ran aground on the Goodwin Sands, Kent and was severely damaged. She was later refloated.

=== 27 December ===
List of shipwrecks: 27 December 1810
Ship	State	Description
Crescent	United Kingdom	The ship ran aground and was wrecked at Lancaster, Lancashire. Her crew were rescued. She was on a voyage from Berbice to Lancaster.
Elizabeth	United Kingdom	The East Indiaman was driven onto a sandbank and wrecked in the North Sea off Dunkirk, Nord, France. There were 382 people on board; the 22 survivors were taken prisoner. Elizabeth was on a voyage from London to Cork and Bengal, India. A complete recounting of this voyage and the wreck was included in a narrative by Captain Robert Eastwick.
Hare	United Kingdom	The ship was wrecked between Folkestone and Dover, Kent. All on board were rescued. She was on a voyage from London to New York, United States.
Hopewell	United Kingdom	The ship was driven ashore near Troon, Ayrshire. She was on a voyage from Miramichi, New Brunswick, British North America to Ayr.
King	United Kingdom	The ship struck a rock and sank in the Londonderry River. Her crew were rescued. She was on a voyage from Drogheda, County Louth to LondonDerry.

=== 28 December ===
List of shipwrecks: 28 December 1810
Ship	State	Description
Eagle	United Kingdom	The ship was lost on the south coast of the Isle of Wight. Her crew were rescued.
Elizabeth	United Kingdom	The ship was wrecked at Dunkerque, Nord, France with the loss of 358 of the 380 people on board. She was on a voyage from London to Madras, India.
Henry	United Kingdom	(first report): Wrecked on Monday night (possibly 24 December) near the Citadel on Plymouth Sound, while out of Lisbon. Her crew were saved.
Minerva	Spain	The brig was wrecked near Newport, Monmouthshire, United Kingdom.

=== 29 December ===
List of shipwrecks: 29 December 1810
Ship	State	Description
HMS Fleur de la Mer	Royal Navy	The schooner foundered in the Atlantic Ocean off Maracaibo, Venezuela. Her crew were rescued by Cassius (United Kingdom).
Mary Ann	United Kingdom	The ship was lost near Bridlington, Yorkshire. Her crew were rescued.

=== 30 December ===
List of shipwrecks: 30 December 1810
Ship	State	Description
Amity	United Kingdom	The ship was driven ashore near Sandy Hook, New Jersey, United States. She was on a voyage from Liverpool, Lancashire to Philadelphia, Pennsylvania, United States.
Flora	(United Kingdom of Great Britain and Ireland) British North America	The ship departed from Sydney, Nova Scotia, British North America for London. No further trace, presumed foundered with the loss of all hands.
Richard and Jane	United Kingdom	The transport ship was lost near Gravelines, Nord, France. Her crew were rescued.
Vigie	France	The naval schooner foundered on 30 December 1810 after running on an uncharted rock off Pointe des Pilours, Sables d'Olonne, France.

=== 31 December ===
List of shipwrecks: 31 December 1810
Ship	State	Description
Diana	United Kingdom	The ship was driven ashore at Ballinacurra, County Cork. She was on a voyage from Limerick to Bristol, Gloucestershire.
Lady Pellew	United Kingdom	The ship departed from Jamaica. No further trace, presumed foundered with the loss of all hands.
Victoria	United Kingdom	The ship foundered in the Mediterranean Sea while on a voyage from Malta to Gibraltar.

=== Unknown date ===
List of shipwrecks: Unknown date in December 1810
Ship	State	Description
Agricola	United Kingdom	The ship was lost at Arkhangelsk, Russia.
Almira	United States	The ship was lost near Aveiro, Portugal.
Amazon	United Kingdom	The ship was lost at Arkhangelsk.
America	United States	The ship was lost at Arkhangelsk.
America	United States	The ship was lost on the "Revelstone".
Amistad	Spain	The ship was driven ashore at Dénia.
Andreas	Russia	The ship foundered in the White Sea.
Anna	Flag unknown	The ship was lost at Arkhangelsk.
Anna Maria	Flag unknown	The ship was lost at Arkhangelsk.
Betsey	United States	The ship sprang a leak and was abandoned by her crew. They were rescued by Jupiter (United Kingdom).
Boston	United States	The ship was lost at Porto, Portugal. She was on a voyage from Philadelphia, Pennsylvania, to Porto.
Caroline	United Kingdom	The ship sprang a leak and foundered in the North Sea. Her crew were rescued. She was on a voyage from London to a Baltic port.
Charlotte	United Kingdom	The ship was lost near St Alban's Head, Dorset with the loss of four of her crew. She was on a voyage from Portsmouth, Hampshire to Cork.
Duke of York	United Kingdom	The ship was lost near Drogheda, County Louth. Her crew were rescued.
Earl of Uxbridge	United Kingdom	The ship was driven ashore at Pendine, Carmarthenshire. She was on a voyage from The Mumbles, Glamorgan to an Irish port.
Eleanor	United Kingdom	The ship was lost at Arkhangelsk, Russia.
Fame	United Kingdom	The ship was wrecked at Peniche, Portugal. Her crew were rescued. She was on a voyage from Lisbon to St. Ubes and London.
Franzina	Flag unknown	The ship was lost at Arkhangelsk.
Frau Elizabeth	Flag unknown	The ship was lost at Arkhangelsk.
Haabet	United Kingdom	The ship foundered in Liverpool Bay off Crosby, Lancashire. She was on a voyage from Newry, County Antrim to Liverpool, Lancashire.
Hardy	United Kingdom	The ship foundered in the Bay of Biscay off A Coruña, Spain with the loss of all but her captain. She was on a voyage from Cork to the West Indies.
Herschel	United Kingdom	The ship was driven ashore at the mouth of the River Mersey. She was on a voyage from Charleston, South Carolina, to Liverpool, Lancashire. She was later refloated and taken in to Liverpool in a damaged condition.
Jane	United Kingdom	The ship was wrecked at North Meols, Lancashire. She was on a voyage from Cork to Liverpool.
Jane and Mary	United Kingdom	The ship was driven ashore in Carnarvon Bay. She was on a voyage from Liverpool to Milford, Pembrokeshire.
John and Esther	United Kingdom	The ship was lost near Wexford with the loss of all hands. She was on a voyage from Whitehaven, Cumberland to Cork.
Juliana Catharina	Flag unknown	The ship was lost at Arkhangelsk.
Lively	United Kingdom	The ship was driven ashore near Portsmouth. She was on a voyage from Bangor to London.
London	United Kingdom	The ship was driven ashore in the River Mersey. She was taken into George's Dock, Liverpool, where she capsized and was wrecked.
Louisa	Flag unknown	The ship was lost at Arkhangelsk.
Lucy	United States	The ship was wrecked at Cape Henry, Virginia. She was on a voyage from Madeira, Portugal to Baltimore, Maryland.
Magnet	United Kingdom	The ship was lost at Arkhangelsk.
Margaret	United Kingdom	The ship foundered in the Irish Sea off the coast of County Wexford with the loss of all hands. She was on a voyage from Havana, Cuba to the Clyde.
Maria Antonio	Spain	The ship was driven ashore at Formby Point, Lancashire. She was on a voyage from Liverpool to Tenerife, Canary Islands.
Mary	United Kingdom	The ship departed Gibraltar for São Miguel, Azores. No further trace, presumed foundered in the Atlantic Ocean with the loss of all hands.
Mercurius	United Kingdom	The ship was lost at Arkhangelsk.
New Century	United Kingdom	The ship was driven ashore near Crinan, Argyllshire. She was on a voyage from Charleston, South Carolina, to the Clyde.
Northern Liberties	United Kingdom	The ship was driven ashore near Liverpool. She was on a voyage from New Orleans, Louisiana Territory to Liverpool. She was refloated.
Orient	United States	The ship was wrecked in the Turks Islands. She was on a voyage from New York to Jamaica. Her crew were rescued.
Orion	United Kingdom	The ship was wrecked whilst on a voyage from New Brunswick to Maryport, Cumberland with the ultimate loss of all but her captain. He was rescued on 21 December by HMS Niemen (Royal Navy).
Phœnix	United Kingdom	The ship was lost on the coast of Sweden.
Rolla	United Kingdom	The ship was lost at Arkhangelsk.
Peace and Plenty	United Kingdom	The Humber Keel was driven ashore and wrecked at Skegness, Lincolnshire with the loss of all hands.
Sarah	United Kingdom	The ship was wrecked near Whitehaven with the loss of all but one of her crew. She was on a voyage from New Brunswick, British North America to Liverpool.
Schooner	United Kingdom	The ship was wrecked at St. Augustine, East Florida, New Spain. She was on a voyage from St. Mary's, Isles of Scilly to Savannah, Georgia, United States.
Spes	Flag unknown	The ship was lost at Arkhangelsk.
Stadt Papenburg	Prussia	The ship was lost at Arkhangelsk.
Success	United Kingdom	The ship was lost near Holyhead, Anglesey. This may be the same ship lost off the Isle of Man whilst on a voyage from Newfoundland to Liverpool.
Success	United Kingdom	The ship was lost at Arkhangelsk.
Sutton	United Kingdom	The ship departed from Gibraltar for London. There was no further trace and she was presumed foundered with the loss of all hands.
Swallow	United Kingdom	The ship was driven ashore and wrecked near Selsea, Sussex. She was on a voyage from Tenerife, Canary Islands to London.
Tarleton	United Kingdom	The ship was driven ashore at Liverpool. She was on a voyage from Charleston, South Carolina, United States to Liverpool.
Thomas	United Kingdom	The ship was lost at Arkhangelsk.
Twee Zwestern	Flag unknown	The ship was lost at Arkhangelsk.
Tynemouth Castle	United Kingdom	The ship ran aground on the Herd Sand, in the North Sea off the coast of County Durham.
Tyro	United Kingdom	The ship was wrecked on the Herd sand. Her crew were rescued by a lifeboat.
Umao	Portugal	The ship was driven ashore in the River Ribble, Lancashire. She was on a voyage from Maranhão, Brazil to Liverpool.
Viagante	Portugal	The ship was wrecked at Hoylake, Lancashire. She was on a voyage from Lisbon to Liverpool.
Virgin	United States	The ship was driven ashore near Liverpool. She was on a voyage from Baltimore, Maryland, to Liverpool. She was refloated.
William	United Kingdom	The ship was lost on the coast of Portugal. She was on a voyage from Lisbon to Liverpool.
William & Betty	United Kingdom	The ship was wrecked whilst on a voyage from Liverpool to a Welsh port.

== Unknown date ==
List of shipwrecks: Unknown date in 1810
Ship	State	Description
HMS Achates	Royal Navy	The Cherokee-class brig-sloop was wrecked in the West Indies. Her crew were rescued.
Addington	United Kingdom	The ship was wrecked on the English coast. She was on a voyage from Messina, Kingdom of Sicily to Leith, Lothian.
Adventure	United Kingdom	The brig was lost in the River Plate.
Alexander	United Kingdom	The ship was driven ashore and wrecked in the "Cameroon River", Africa.
Ann	United Kingdom	The ship was driven ashore at Richibucto, New Brunswick, British North America. She was on a voyage from Quebec City, Lower Canada, British North America to Jamaica.
Bellona	United Kingdom	The ship was driven ashore on the coast of New Brunswick. She was on a voyage from Saint John, New Brunswick to Plymouth, Devon. Bellona was later refloated and taken in to Saint John.
Betsey	United Kingdom	The ship sprang a leak and was abandoned by her crew. She was on a voyage from Martinique to London.
Betsey	United Kingdom	The ship was lost at Havana, Cuba. She was on a voyage from Nassau, Bahamas to New Orleans, Louisiana Territory.
Bom Fim	Portugal	The ship was wrecked on the coast of Brazil with the loss of eleven of her crew. She was on a voyage from Liverpool, Lancashire, United Kingdom to Brazil.
Bronti	United Kingdom	The ship was lost near Curaçao. Her crew were rescued. She was on a voyage from Hayti to Curaçao.
Brothers	United Kingdom	The ship was lost in the River Plate.
Brutus	United Kingdom	The ship foundered in the Atlantic Ocean whilst on a voyage from Liverpool to New York, United States via the Cape Verde Islands.
Cambria	United Kingdom	The ship was lost in the Cayman Islands. She was on a voyage from Jamaica to London.
Cambridge	United Kingdom	The ship put into Havana in 1810 having sustained damage while sailing from Jamaica to Liverpool. She was later condemned and she and her cargo were sold there.
Charles	United Kingdom	The ship foundered whilst on a voyage from the Gulf of Persia to Bengal, India.
Dorida	United Kingdom	The ship foundered in the Atlantic Ocean. Her crew were rescued by Sophia (United Kingdom). Dorida was on a voyage from Amelia Island, East Florida, New Spain to Sheerness, Kent.
Duncan	United Kingdom	The ship was lost in the Cayman Islands. She was on a voyage from Jamaica to Dublin.
El Viacedor	Spanish Navy	The ship of the line was wrecked in the Bay of Boza, Sardinia.
Enterprize	United Kingdom	The ship sank in the River Plate. Her crew were rescued.
Fame	United Kingdom	The ship foundered whilst on a voyage from Greenock to Newfoundland. Her crew were rescued.
Fame	United States	The ship was lost on the coast of East Florida, New Spain. She was on a voyage from New Orleans to Liverpool.
Favourite	United Kingdom	The ship was captured by the privateer Navarrois (France) whilst on a voyage from Quebec City to London. She was set afire and sunk.
Franklin	United States	The ship foundered in the Grand Banks of Newfoundland. Her crew survived. She was on a voyage from Virginia to a British port.
Friends	United Kingdom	The ship sprang a leak and was abandoned in the Grand Banks of Newfoundland. Her crew were rescued by Favourite (United Kingdom). Friends was on a voyage from Teignmouth, Devon to St. John's, Newfoundland.
General Romana	Spain	Napoleonic Wars: The ship was captured by the privateer Duc de Dantzig (France) and sunk by her before 4 December.
George	United Kingdom	The ship was abandoned in the Atlantic Ocean. She was on a voyage from St. Andrews, New Brunswick, British North America to Aberdeen.
Governor Barnes	United Kingdom	Napoleonic Wars: The ship was captured and burnt by Néréide (French Navy). She was on a voyage from Hayti to Saint Thomas, Virgin Islands.
Harriet	United Kingdom	The ship was wrecked on the coast of Nova Scotia, British North America.
Helen	United Kingdom	The ship was lost in the Saint Lawrence River. She was on a voyage from Quebec City to London.
Hope	United Kingdom	The ship was lost in the Saint Lawrence River. She was on a voyage from London to Quebec City.
Industry	United Kingdom	Napoleonic Wars: The ship was captured and burnt by the privateer Duc de Dantzig (France) before 4 November.
Jacoba Frederica	Sweden	The sloop, a prize of HMS Fisgard (Royal Navy), was wrecked on Anholt, Denmark between 26 November and 3 December.
Jane	United Kingdom	The ship ran aground in the Delaware River. She was on a voyage from Philadelphia, Pennsylvania, United States to Liverpool.
Jane	United Kingdom	The ship foundered off the coast of Africa.
Jannet	United Kingdom	The ship sprang a leak and was beached in Penobscot Bay, Maine, United States. She was on a voyage from Douglas, Nova Scotia to Liverpool.
Johns	United Kingdom	The ship was lost near Pará, Brazil.
Kingston	United Kingdom	The ship was wrecked on Barbuda. She was on a voyage from Liverpool to St. Croix, Virgin Islands.
Lapwing	United States	The ship capsized whilst on a voyage from Martinique to New York.
Leander	United Kingdom	The ship was wrecked on Grand Manan Island, New Brunswick.
Little Venus	United Kingdom	The ship was lost in the River Plate.
London	United Kingdom	The ship was wrecked on Anegada, Virgin Islands. She was on a voyage from London to Haiti.
Lord Duncan	United Kingdom	The ship was abandoned in the Atlantic Ocean. She was on a voyage from Pictou, Nova Scotia to Leith.
Mack	United States	The ship was abandoned whilst on a voyage from Virginia to Liverpool.
Margaret	United States	The ship foundered with the ultimate loss of 21 lives. Three survivors were rescued by an American vessel after 54 days.
Maria	United States	The ship was lost at Cape Hatteras, North Carolina. She was on a voyage from Martinique to New York.
Mary	United Kingdom	The ship was lost at Guadeloupe.
Mary	United Kingdom	The whaling ship foundered off East Cape, New Zealand sometime early in 1810. All crew were rescued She was on a voyage from London to New Zealand.
May Flower	United Kingdom	The ship was wrecked on the coast of Brazil. She was on a voyage from Brazil to Liverpool.
Mercury	United Kingdom	The schooner was wrecked on the coast of Haiti.
Modestia	Spain	The ship foundered off Cuba. She was on a voyage from Spain to Veracruz, Captaincy General of Venezuela.
Nostra Señora del Ampora	Spain	The ship was wrecked on the Morant Cays, Jamaica.
Nymphe	United Kingdom	The ship was lost near Cape Frio, Brazil. She was on a voyage from the Cape of Good Hope to Rio de Janeiro, Viceroyalty of the Río de la Plata.
Pallas	United Kingdom	Napoleonic Wars: The ship was captured by the privateer Navarrois (France) whilst on a voyage from Quebec to London. She was set afire and sunk.
Pizzaro	United Kingdom	The ship was driven ashore and wrecked at Savannah, Georgia, United States.
Portera	United Kingdom	The ship was wrecked on Anticosti Island, Nova Scotia. She was on a voyage from Quebec City to Saltcoats, Ayrshire.
Princess Amelia	United Kingdom	The ship sank in the "River St. Mary's".
Reliance	United Kingdom	The ship was lost in the Gulf of Mexico. She was on a voyage from British Honduras to London.
Resolution	United Kingdom	The ship was wrecked on the coast of Africa.
Richard	United Kingdom	The ship was driven ashore near Quebec City. She was on a voyage from Quebec City to Liverpool.
Rochdale	United Kingdom	The ship was lost in the Saint Lawrence River. She was on a voyage from Quebec City to Newcastle upon Tyne, Northumberland.
Rosina	United Kingdom	The ship was listed as "lost" in the 1810 issue of the Register of Shipping and did not appear in the 1811 issue, but she did appear in the 1812 issue with new owners.
Ruth	United Kingdom	The ship was lost near Pará.
Salerno	United Kingdom	The ship was wrecked at Messina, Kingdom of Sicily.
Sarah	United Kingdom	The ship was lost in the Senegal River.
Susan	United Kingdom	The ship was wrecked on Amelia Island. She was on a voyage from Amelia Island to the Clyde.
Three Brothers	United Kingdom	The ship was wrecked near Colonia del Sacramento, Viceroyalty of the Río de la Plata. She was on a voyage from Rio de Janeiro to Buenos Aires, Viceroyalty of the Río de la Plata.
Transit	United Kingdom	The ship was wrecked on a reef off Heneaga. She was on a voyage from Hayti to Smyrna, Ottoman Empire.
Trio	United Kingdom	The ship was lost in the Saint Lawrence River.
Union	United Kingdom	The ship was lost in the Saint Lawrence River. Her crew were rescued.
Unity	United Kingdom	The ship was wrecked on the coast of Labrador, British North America.
Watt	United Kingdom	The ship sapsized in a squall off Point-a-Petre, Guadeloupe with the loss of five of her crew. She was on a voyage from Liverpool to Guadeloupe.
Young Lass	United Kingdom	The ship was lost near Halifax, Nova Scotia, British North America.
Young William	United Kingdom	Napoleonic Wars: The ship was burnt at Madagascar by some French frigates.
