= List of ship launches in 1799 =

The list of ship launches in 1799 includes a chronological list of some ships launched in 1799.

Date	Ship	Class	Builder	Location	Country	Notes
21 January	General Greene	Frigate	Benjamin Talman & James de Wolf	Warren, Rhode Island	United States	For United States Navy
23 January	Whim	Schooner	Francis Barnard, Son & Roberts	Deptford	Great Britain	For British East India Company.
24 January	Earl of Mornington	Packet ship	Perry, Wells & Green	Blackwall Yard	Great Britain	For British East India Company.
28 February	Arran	East Indiaman	J. Gilmore	Calcutta	India	For private owner.
23 April	Amethyst	Penelope-class frigate	Thomas Pollard	Deptford Dockyard	Great Britain	For Royal Navy.
24 April	Amethyst	Penelope-class frigate		Deptford Dockyard	Great Britain	For Royal Navy
17 May	Mutine	Mutine-class corvette		Le Havre	France	For French Navy.
18 May	Adams	Brig	River Rouge Military Shipyard	Detroit, Michigan	United States	For United States Army.
18 May	Amazon	Amazon-class frigate	Woolwich Dockyard	Woolwich	Great Britain	For Royal Navy
18 May	Dix-Huit Fructidor	Tonnant-class ship of the line	Pierre-Elisabeth Rolland	Rochefort	France	For French Navy.
20 May	Boston	Frigate	Edmund Hartt	Boston	United States	For United States Navy
22 May	Iaroslav	Yaroslav-class ship of the line	G. Ignatyev	Arkhangelsk	Russia	For Imperial Russian Navy.
22 May	Moskva	Yaroslav-class ship of the line	G. Ignatyev	Arkhangelsk	Russia	For Imperial Russian Navy.
24 May	Chattam	Wreeker-class ship of the line	Peter Glavimans	Rotterdam	Batavian Republic	For Batavian Navy.
3 June	Diana	West Indiaman	Thomas Pitcher	Northfleet	Great Britain	For J. Potts.
3 June	Maryland	Sloop-of-war		Baltimore, Maryland	United States	For United States Navy
5 June	John Adams	Frigate	Charles Prichard	Charleston, South Carolina	United States	For United States Navy.
6 June	Connecticut	Frigate	Seth Overton	Chatham, Connecticut	United States	For United States Navy.
8 June	Adams	Frigate	John Jackson & William Sheffield	New York City	United States	For United States Navy
17 June	Perseus	Transport ship	Thomas Haw	Stockton-on-Tees	Great Britain	For Reeve & Co.
20 June	Chesapeake	Sloop-of-war	De Rochbruns		United States	For United States Navy.
1 July	Willerby	West Indiaman	Perry, Wells & Green	Blackwall	Great Britain	For Dale & Co.
8 July	Indivisible	Tonnant-class ship of the line	Leon-Michel Guignace	Toulon	France	For French Navy.
16 July	Aurore	Mutine-class corvette		Le Havre	France	For French Navy.
17 July	Égyptienne	Fifth rate		Toulon	France	For French Navy
22 July	Sviatoi Piotr	Third rate	G. Ignatyev	Arkhangelsk	Russia	For Imperial Russian Navy.
22 July	Tikhvinskaya Bogoroditsa	Feodosii Totemskii-class frigate	G. Ignatyev	Arkhangelsk	Russia	For Imperial Russian Navy.
23 July	Seringapatam	Man-of-war		Bombay Dockyard	India	For Tippu Sultan.
July	Vigie	Telegraph-class schooner	Louis Matherin & Antoine Crucy	Nantes	France	For French Navy.
1 August	Didon	Virginie-class frigate	Enterprise Ethéart	Saint-Malo	France	For French Navy.
1 August	Union	Téméraire-class ship of the line		Lorient	France	For French Navy
7 August	Mariia Magdalina Vtoraja	Sviatoi Pyotr-class ship of the line	V. I. Potapov	Kherson	Russia	For Imperial Russian Navy.
10 August	Sir Godfrey Webster	West Indiaman	Perry, Wells & Green	Blackwall	Great Britain	For Plumber & Co.
13 August	Thémis	Coquille-class frigate		Rochefort	France	For French Navy.
15 August	Congress	Frigate	James K. Hackett	Portsmouth, New Hampshire	United States	For United States Navy
16 August	Apollo	Apollo-class frigate	Dudman	Deptford Wharf	Great Britain	For Royal Navy
31 August	Chiffonne	Heureuse-class frigate	Antoine Crucy	Nantes	France	For French Navy.
15 September	Guerrière	Fifth rate		Cherbourg	France	For French Navy.
23 September	Éclair	Schooner	Mathurin Crucy	Nantes	France	For French Navy.
26 September	Warren	Sloop-of-war	Webster	Salisbury, Massachusetts	United States	For United States Navy.
30 September	Abundance	Transport ship	Adams	Bucklers Hard	Great Britain	For Royal Navy.
30 September	Essex	Fifth rate	Enoss Briggs	Salem, Massachusetts	United States	For United States Navy
September	Toronto	Schooner	John Dennis	York	(Kingdom of Great Britain) Upper Canada	For Provincial Marine.
1 October	Hussar	Amazon-class frigate	John Tovery	Woolwich Dockyard	Great Britain	For Royal Navy.
12 October	Minorca	Merchantman			Great Britain	For private owner.
14 October	Lady Burges	East Indiaman	Perry, Wells & Green	Blackwall	Great Britain	For John Prinsep.
17 October	Carlebury	West Indiaman	James Minns		Great Britain	For Chisman & Co.
29 October	Lord Nelson	East Indiaman	Barnard	Deptford	Great Britain	For British East India Company.
6 November	Sviataia Paraskeva	Sviatoi Pyotr-class ship of the line	M. K. Surovtsov	Kherson	Russia	For Imperial Russian Navy.
13 November	Bengal	East Indiaman	Perry, Wells & Green	Blackwall	Great Britain	For British East India Company.
November	Experiment	Enterprise-class schooner	Henry Spencer	Baltimore, Maryland	United States	For United States Navy.
28 November	Philadelphia	Philadelphia-class frigate	Samuel Humphreys	Philadelphia, Pennsylvania	United States	For United States Navy
29 November	Marquis Wellesley	East Indiaman	Randall	Rotherhithe	Great Britain	For British East India Company.
2 December	Chesapeake	Frigate	Josiah Fox	Gosport Navy Yard, Virginia	United States	For United States Navy
13 December	Earl St Vincent	East Indiaman	Barnard	Deptford	Great Britain	For John Pascall Larkins.
13 December	Walthamstow	East Indiaman	Randall & Brent	Rotherhithe	Great Britain	For British East India Company.
14 December	Active	Fifth rate	Chatham Dockyard	Chatham	Great Britain	For Royal Navy
24 December	Porcher	Merchantman	Gillet, Larkins & Co.	Calcutta	India	For Benmajin Blake.
Unknown date	Achilles	Snow	T. Wake	Sunderland	Great Britain	For private owner.
Unknown date	Actif	Privateer		Bordeaux	France	For private owner.
Unknown date	Active	Slave ship		Bristol	Great Britain	For Mr. Anderson.
Unknown date	Albion	Merchantman	John & Philip Laing	Sunderland	Great Britain	For private owner.
Unknown date	Alert	Schooner	Nicholas Bools & William Good	Bridport	Great Britain	For John Miller and others.
Unknown date	Angola	Slave ship		Lancaster	Great Britain	For Mr. Overend.
Unknown date	Asia	Transport ship	Edward Mosley	North Shields	Great Britain	For Mr. Fleming.
Unknown date	Atalanta	Merchantman		Bermuda	(Kingdom of Great Britain) Bermuda	For private owner.
Unknown date	Augusta	Brig of War			United States	For United States Navy.
Unknown date	Auspicious	Merchantman	William Rowe	Newcastle upon Tyne	Great Britain	For J. Lyall.
Unknown date	Backhouse	Full-rigged ship		Hull	Great Britain	For Mr. Backhouse.
Unknown date	Barton	Merchantman		Bermuda	(Kingdom of Great Britain) Bermuda	For Seller & Co.
Unknown date	Beaufort	Row galley		Beaufort, South Carolina	United States	Presented to the United States Government. Placed in service with the United States Navy.
Unknown date	Bedr-i Zafer	Fourth rate	Dimitri Kalfa	Ereğli	Ottoman Empire	For Ottoman Navy.
Unknown date	Bellona	West Indiaman	Fishburn & Broderick	Whitby	Great Britain	For Fishburn & Broderick.
Unknown date	Bordelais	Privateer	Courau Frères	Bordeaux	France	For private owner.
Unknown date	Cachelot	Full-rigged ship		Dunkirk	France	For Batavian Navy.
Unknown date	Caerwent	West Indiaman		Rotherhithe	Great Britain	For J. Thompson.
Unknown date	Camden	West Indiaman	Randall & Brent	Rotherhithe	Great Britain	For Lushington & Co.
Unknown date	Charlton	East Indiaman	Michael Humble	Liverpool	Great Britain	For British East India Company.
Unknown date	Civan-i Bahri	Fourth rate	Jean-Baptiste Benoit	Limnos	(Ottoman Empire) Ottoman Greece	For Ottoman Navy.
Unknown date	Crocodil	Full-rigged ship		Dunkirk	France	For Batavian Navy.
Unknown date	Dart	Slave ship		Dartmouth	Great Britain	For Lake & Co.
Unknown date	Diana	West Indiaman		Topsham	Great Britain	For Dare & Co.
Unknown date	Diana	Merchantman	John & Philip Laing	Sunderland	Great Britain	For Mr. Wilson.
Unknown date	Elizabeth	Square		Sunderland	Great Britain	For private owner.
Unknown date	Enterprise	Enterprise-class schooner	Henry Spencer	Baltimore, Maryland	United States	For United States Navy.
Unknown date	Essex	Whaler		Amesbury, Massachusetts	United States	For private owner.
Unknown date	Fishburn	Merchantman		Sunderland	Great Britain	For Mr Ward.
Unknown date	Fly	Schooner	Nicholas Bools & William Good	Bridport	Great Britain	For Nicholas Bools, John Miller and others.
Unknown date	Fox	Sloop	Nicholas Bools & William Good	Bridport	Great Britain	For Nicholas Bools & William Good.
Unknown date	Grijpvogel	Schooner		Rotterdam	Batavian Republic	For Dutch East India Company.
Unknown date	Herald	Sloop	J. Barry	Whitby	Great Britain	For J. Berry.
Unknown date	Infanta Amelia	Sloop-of-war		Bilbao	Spain	For Spanish Navy.
Unknown date	John Bull	Slave ship		Liverpool	Great Britain	For Taylor & Co.
Unknown date	Kaikusroo	Full-rigged ship		Bombay	India	For private owner.
Unknown date	Kaplan-i Bahri	Third rate	Frederick Ludwig af Klintberg	Rhodes	(Ottoman Empire) Ottoman Greece	For Ottoman Navy.
Unknown date	Kent	East Indiaman	Thomas Pitcher	Northfleet	Great Britain	For Henry Bonham.
Unknown date	Kilidülbahir	Third rate	Gülşen Bey	Sohom	Ottoman Empire	For Ottoman Navy.
Unknown date	Kingston	Merchantman			Great Britain	For private owner.
Unknown date	La Trompeuse	Privateer		Nantes	France	For private owner.
Unknown date	Leander	Slave ship		River Thames	Great Britain	For Ewing Hugham.
Unknown date	Leander	Merchantman			Great Britain	For T. Huggins.
Unknown date	Leander	Merchantman	John & Philip Laing	Sunderland	Great Britain	For Scaling & Laing.
Unknown date	Legkii	Brig			Russia	For Imperial Russian Navy.
Unknown date	Lord Nelson	Cutter	Nicholas Bools & William Good	Bridport	Great Britain	For Robert Penney and others.
Unknown date	Margaret	Brig		London	Great Britain	For Turnbull & Co.
Unknown date	Martha	Sealer		Sydney	(Kingdom of Great Britain) New South Wales	For Reed, Boston & Co.
Unknown date	Messeret-i Bahri	Sixth rate	Frederick Ludwig af Klintberg	Rhodes	(Ottoman Empire) Ottoman Greece	For Ottoman Navy.
Unknown date	Mornington	Merchantman	J. Gilmore & Co.	Calcutta	India	For Fairlie & Co.
Unknown date	Moucheron	Privateer			France	For private owner.
Unknown date	New Grove	Merchantman		Whitby	Great Britain	For T. Brown.
Unknown date	Nautilus	Schooner	Harry Spencer	Maryland	United States	For private owner
Unknown date	Norfolk Hero	Merchantman		Great Yarmouth	Great Britain	For Mr. Preston.
Unknown date	Pitt	Merchantman		Ulverston	Great Britain	For Mr Atkinson.
Unknown date	Rambler	Sloop	Nicholas Bools & William Good	Bridport	Great Britain	For Nicholas Bools & William Good.
Unknown date	Seddülbahir	Third rate	Jean-Baptiste Benoit	Constantinople	Ottoman Empire	For Ottoman Navy.
Unknown date	Sting	Schooner		Bermuda	(Kingdom of Great Britain) Bermuda	For private owner.
Unknown date	Teignmouth	Sloop		Bombay	India	For British East India Company.
Unknown date	Utile	Privateer		Bordeaux	France	For private owner.
Unknown date	Vanguard	Slave ship		Liverpool	Great Britain	For private owner.
Unknown date	Weazle	Sloop-of-war	Thomas King	Dover	Great Britain	For Royal Navy.
Unknown date	Name unknown	Merchantman			France	For private owner.
Unknown date	Name unknown	Merchantman			United States	For private owner.
Unknown date	Name unknown	Merchantman			United States	For private owner.
Unknown date	Name unknown	Merchantman		France or Spain		For private owner.
Unknown date	Name unknown	Merchantman		Batavia	(Batavian Republic) Netherlands East Indies	For private owner.
Unknown date	Name unknown	Merchantman		Bilbao	Spain	For private owner.
