= Asia (ship) =

A number of ships have been named Asia, including:

== Sailing ships ==
- Asia (1797 ship) was launched at Bombay Dockyard. She made two voyages for the British East India Company (EIC). The Admiralty purchased her in 1805 and she served the British Royal Navy as a fifth rate and storeship HMS Sir Francis Drake until 1825. Blythe Bros., London, purchased her and sailed her between England and India under a license from the EIC. The ex-Emperor of Brazil, Dom Pedro, purchased her in 1831 and she became the frigate Dona Maria II. She took part in several engagements during the Liberal Wars. In 1850 an explosion, believed sabotage, destroyed her at Macau.
- Asia (1798 ship) was launched at Philadelphia in 1798. She then made voyages to India and China. She was captured in 1805 for trading with the French. New owners renamed her Duchess of York. Under that name she traded with the West Indies and South America.
- Asia (1799 ship) was launched at North Shields, Newcastle-on-Tyne. She sailed first as a transport and then as a general trader. She was lost at sea in 1835.
- Asia (1811 EIC ship) she made ten voyages for the British East India Company (EIC), and was condemned in 1840.
- Asia (1813 ship) was a merchant barque built at Whitby. She made one voyage to India for the EIC in 1820-21, and one voyage to Van Diemen's Land in 1827-28. Asia then traded to the Mediterranean, but mostly to Quebec. She was last listed in 1850.
- Asia (1815 ship) was a merchant ship launched at Calcutta for Charles Hackett. She made four voyages transporting convicts from Great Britain to Australia, and two voyages between 1826–1830 under charter to the EIC. She was hulked or broken up c.1860.
- Asia (1818 ship) was a merchant ship built by A. Hall & Company at Aberdeen. She made eight voyages between 1820 and 1836 transporting convicts from Britain to Australia. At the same time she served in private trade to India as a licensed ship. She also made one voyage carrying assisted emigrants to New South Wales. She was last listed in 1845.
- Asia (whaleship) was a French whaleship that sailed out of Havre from 1829 to 1855. She made fourteen voyages.

=== See also ===
- Asia (East Indiaman), any one of nine sailing vessels with that name that served the British East India Company.

== Steamships ==
- Asia (1850), a transatlantic paddle steamer of the British and North American Royal Mail Steam Packet Company (Cunard)
- SS Asia (1873), a Canadian steamer on the Great Lakes
- SS Asia (1907), a cargo liner built for Cosulich Line

== Warships ==
- HMS Asia – any of five warships of the British Royal Navy
