= Asia (East Indiaman) =

A number of ships with the name Asia served the British East India Company (EIC) as East Indiamen:

- Asia (1764 EIC ship) — of 657 tons (bm), launched by Perry, Blackwall, in January 1764; made four voyages for the EIC. On her fifth voyage she arrived at Calcutta where she was surveyed, condemned on 13 October 1774, and sold for breaking up.
- Asia (1780 EIC ship) was launched in 1780 and made six voyages for the EIC. She was present at the battle of Porto Praya and participated in the action of 10 September 1782. In 1799 her owners sold her to Beatson & Co., London, for the London-Lisbon trade. On 31 March 1802 Beatson sold her to buyers in Embden who renamed her Reine Louise de Prusse. She returned to the Far East trade and her ultimate fate is unknown.
- HMS Sir Francis Drake was Asia, of 735 tons (bm), which was launched at Bombay in 1797 for the British East India Company (EIC). The Royal Navy purchased her in 1805 and she served as the 32-gun fifth rate frigate Sir Francis Drake until 1825 when the Admiralty sold her on condition that she be broken up.
- Asia (1798 EIC ship) was launched in 1798 by Humble, Liverpool. She made four voyages for the EIC. Asia was wrecked on a sandbank in the Hoogly River in 1809.

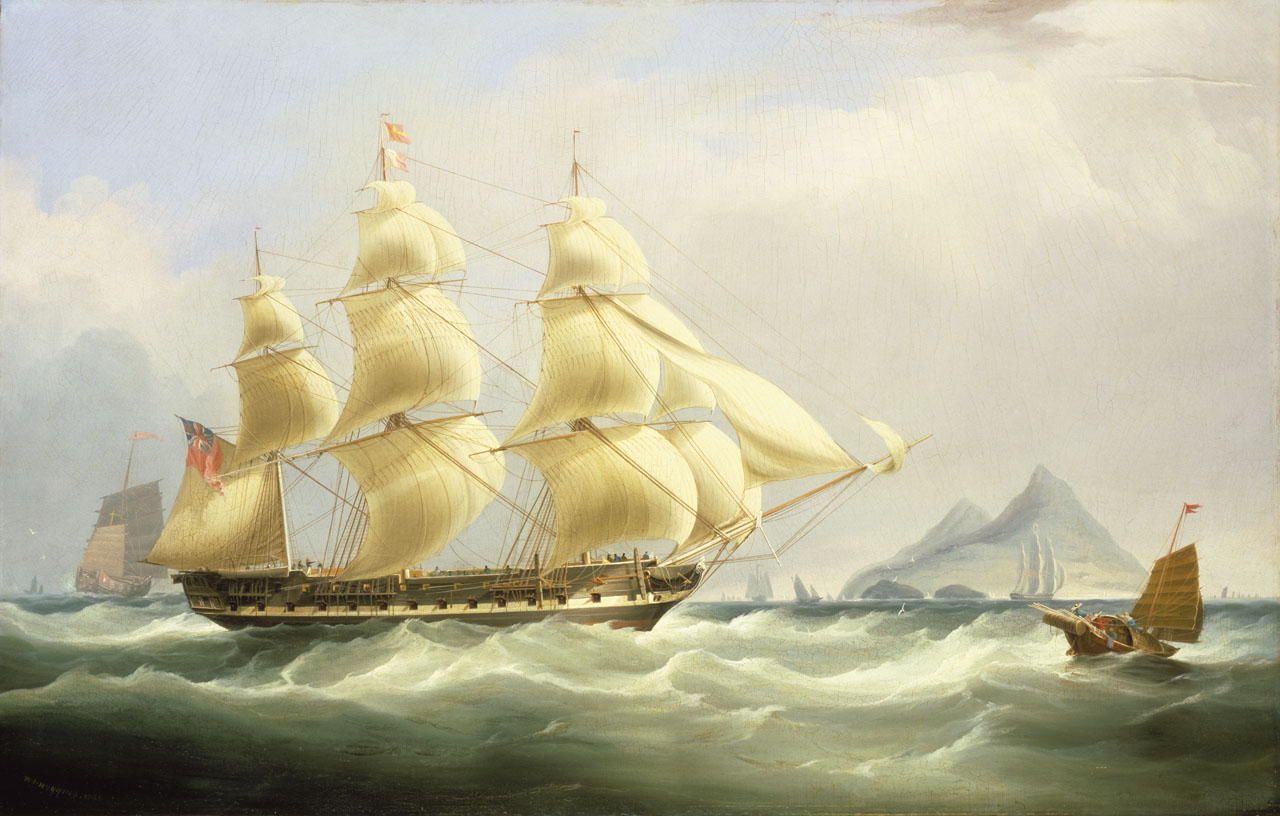
The East Indiaman Asia, William John Huggins

- Asia (1811 EIC ship) was launched in 1811 by Barnard, Deptford. She made ten voyages for the EIC. from 1834 to 1839 she continued to trade with the Far East; she was broken up in 1840.
- Asia (1813 ship) was a merchant barque of 458 tons (bm), built at Whitby in 1813. She made one voyage to India for the EIC in 1820-21, and one voyage to Van Diemen's Land in 1827-28. Asia then traded to the Mediterranean, but mostly to Quebec. She was last listed in 1850.
- Asia (1815 ship) was a merchant ship launched at Calcutta in 1815. She made four voyages transporting convicts from Great Britain to Australia, and two voyages under charter to the British East India Company (EIC) between 1826-1830.
- Asia (1817 ship), of 410 tons (bm), was a merchant brig built at Shields in 1816. During her career, she made one voyage for the British East India Company (EIC), and one transporting convicts from England to Van Diemen's Land. She is last listed in 1833.

== See also ==
- Asia (ship)
- HMS Asia
