= List of ships named Nimrod =

Numerous ships have been named Nimrod for the biblical character Nimrod.

- Nimrod was a sloop of 40 tons (bm) launched on the Thames in 1776. She entered Lloyd's Register in 1787 as "Nimrdo" with master J. Barrett, owner James Mather, and trade London-Falkland Islands. She was on her first whaling voyage when she was lost at the Falklands in 1788. Waterford packet, another whaler, saved Nimrod's master, Horton, and crew and carried them to Faial in the Azores.
- Nimrod was the former French ship Éole which the Royal Navy captured and took into service as HMS Nimrod and sold in 1811. She then made three whaling voyages between 1811 and 1819.
- Nimrod (1809 ship) was launched in Montreal, Quebec. She transferred her registry to England, and started trading between London and Honduras. She was wrecked on 17 February 1813.
- Nimrod (1810 ship), was launched in Delaware in 1799 and was listed as engaging in the British Southern Whale Fishery in 1815. She was first listed Lloyd's Register in 1810 and was last listed in 1820.
- Nimrod was an American brig launched in 1803 that the British Royal Navy captured in 1807 and took into service as HMS Netley. She was broken up in 1814.
- HMS Nimrod (1812) was launched in 1812 and sold to mercantile service in 1827. In 1841, under the command of Captain Manning, she transported assisted emigrants from Liverpool to Port Phillip (Melbourne), and Sydney.
- Nimrod (1821 ship) was a barque launched at Calcutta in 1821. She sailed in the South Pacific, for a while as a whaler, and then as a trader. Records become thin after the late 1840s.
- Nimrod (1824 ship) was a brig launched at Greenock in 1824. From about 1839 she sailed out of Australian and New Zealand ports, some of that time as a whaler. She was wrecked in 1854.
- Nimrod was an American whaler that made some 20 whaling voyages from Sag Harbour from 1830 until she was condemned at Sydney on 28 November 1860.
- Nimrod was an American whaler launched at South Dartmouth, Massachusetts in 1842. CSS Shenandoah captured and burned her on 26 June 1865, near St. Lawrence Island in the Bering Sea.
- PS Nimrod was a paddle steamer that sank of the coast of Wales in 1860.
- Nimrod (1867 ship) - launched in 1867 and wrecked in 1919 − was the ship Ernest Shackleton used in his 1908 Antarctic Nimrod Expedition for the South Pole.

== See also ==
- HMS Nimrod
- Hired armed cutter Nimrod
