= USS Beaufort =

USS Beaufort may refer to any of five ships of the United States Navy named after Beaufort, South Carolina.

- USS Beaufort (1799), a galley constructed by the citizens of Beaufort, South Carolina
- USS Beaufort (AK-6), a seized German steel-hulled collier named Rudolph Blumberg
- USS Beaufort (PF-59), laid down on 21 July 1943
- USS Beaufort (PCS-1387), a subchaser laid down on 22 May 1943
- USS Beaufort (ATS-2), laid down on 19 February 1968 at Lowestoft, England

== See also ==
- CSS Beaufort
