= List of shipwrecks in November 1833 =

The list of shipwrecks in November 1833 includes ships sunk, foundered, grounded, or otherwise lost during November 1833.

== 1 November ==
List of shipwrecks: 1 November 1833
Ship	State	Description
Adventure	(United Kingdom of Great Britain and Ireland) Jersey	The ship was driven ashore at Saint Aubin, Jersey.
Artuouse	United Kingdom	The brig was driven ashore at Troon, Ayrshire. She was on a voyage from Cardiff, Glamorgan to the Clyde. Artuouse was later refloated.
Betock	United Kingdom	The brig was driven ashore at Troon. She was later refloated.
Crown	United Kingdom	The schooner was driven ashore at Troon. She was later refloated.
Delight	United Kingdom	The ship was wrecked on Flotta, Orkney Islands. She was on a voyage from Arkhangelsk, Russia to Dublin.
Eliza	United Kingdom	The ship was driven ashore at Troon. She was later refloated.
Elsabe	Kingdom of Hanover	The ship was driven ashore on the "Watt".
George	United Kingdom	The ship was driven ashore at Widewall, Orkney Islands.
Harmony	United Kingdom	The ship was driven ashore near Neath, Glamorgan with the loss of two of her crew. She was on a voyage from Falmouth, Cornwall to Swansea, Glamorgan.
Jean	United Kingdom	The ship was driven ashore at Widewall.
John and Mary	United Kingdom	The ship was driven ashore on Barry Island, Glamorgan. She refloated but was consequently abandoned by her crew. John and Mary was on a voyage from Dundalk, County Louth to Newport, Monmouthshire.
John Guise	United Kingdom	The brig was driven ashore at Troon.
Lady Ann	United Kingdom	The brig was driven ashore at Troon.
Louisa Sophis	Prussia	The ship was driven ashore at Falsterbo, Sweden.
Marcella and Maria	United Kingdom	The ship was driven ashore at St Margaret's Hope, Orkney Islands.
Margaret Brown	United Kingdom	The sloop was driven ashore and wrecked at Troon with the loss of all hands. She was taken in to Troon on 16 November to be repaired.
Neptunus	Bremen	The ship was driven ashore at Helsingborg, Sweden. She was on a voyage from Bremen to Gävle, Sweden.
Resolution	United Kingdom	The ship was abandoned in the North Sea off the Dudgeon Sandbank.
Sarah	United Kingdom	The ship foundered in the North Sea off the mouth of the Humber. Her crew were rescued. She was on a voyage from Spalding, Lincolnshire to Goole, Yorkshire.
Societat	Kingdom of Hanover	The ship was driven ashore on the "Watt".
Thomas and Harriet	United Kingdom	The ship foundered in the North Sea off Hollesley Bay, Suffolk. She was on a voyage from Boston, Lincolnshire to London.
Traveller	United Kingdom	The ship foundered on the Vogel Sandbank, in the North Sea off Cuxhaven, Kingdom of Hanover with the loss of two of her crew. The survivors arrived at Cuxhaven on 2 November in the ship's boat. Traveller was on a voyage from Sunderland, County Durham to Hamburg.

== 2 November ==
List of shipwrecks: 2 November 1833
Ship	State	Description
Comely	United Kingdom	The ship was wrecked on "Hornholm". Her crew were rescued. She was on a voyage from Dundee, Forfarshire to Riga, Russia.
Hamburg	United Kingdom	The schooner was wrecked on Norderney, Kingdom of Hanover with the loss of all hands. She was on a voyage from Hull, Yorkshire to Hamburg.
Henrick	Netherlands	The ship was driven ashore on Juist, Kingdom of Hanover. Her crew were rescued. She was on a voyage from a Norwegian port to "Carolinzyl".
Joan Baptista	Spain	The ship was driven ashore at "Blexham". She was on a voyage from Barcelona to Hamburg.
Margaret	United Kingdom	The ship was driven ashore on Islay, Ayrshire. She was on a voyage from Glasgow, Renfrewshire to Westport, County Mayo.
Margaret	United Kingdom	The brig was wrecked on the Scottish coast with the loss of all hands. She was on a voyage from Ballyshannon, County Donegal to Liverpool, Lancashire.
Margaret	United Kingdom	The ship departed from Sunderland, County Durham for Lossiemouth, Inverness-shire. No further trace, presumed foundered in the North Sea with the loss of all hands.
Martin	United Kingdom	The ship was driven ashore on Texel, North Holland, Netherlands. Her crew were rescued. She was on a voyage from Hastings, Sussex to Newcastle upon Tyne, Northumberland.
Maybud	United Kingdom	The ship sprang a leak and was abandoned in the North Sea. Her crew were rescued by Sir Edward Hamilton (United Kingdom). Maybud was on a voyage from Sunderland, County Durham to Aldeburgh, Suffolk.
Nancy	United Kingdom	The ship was driven ashore and wrecked near Holyhead, Anglesey. Her crew were rescued. She was on a voyage from Wicklow to Liverpool, Lancashire.
Neptunus	United Kingdom	The sloop was abandoned in the English Channel off Porthleven, Cornwall. She subsequently drove ashore in a cavern and wrecked. Her crew perished.
Orion	Hamburg	The ship was driven ashore on Juist. She was on a voyage from Hamburg to Nantes, Loire-Inférieure, France.

== 3 November ==
List of shipwrecks: 3 November 1833
Ship	State	Description
Albion	United Kingdom	The ship was driven ashore and wrecked near Blakeney, Norfolk with some loss of life. She was refloated in late November.
Anna Christina	Denmark	The ship was driven ashore on Amrum, Duchy of Schleswig. She was on a voyage from Tønder to Hull, Yorkshire, United Kingdom.
Augusta Dorothea	Hamburg	The ship was driven ashore on Terschelling, Friesland, Netherlands. All on board were rescued. She was on a voyage from London, United Kingdom to Hamburg
Brouwer	Netherlands	The ship was driven ashore of Vlieland, Friesland. Her crew were rescued. She was on a voyage from Newcastle upon Tyne, Northumberland to Amsterdam, North Holland.
Caroline	United Kingdom	The ship was abandoned in The Wash off King's Lynn, Norfolk. She was on a voyage from Sunderland, County Durham to Shoreham-by-Sea, Sussex.
Doris	United Kingdom	The ship was abandoned in the North Sea (52°36′N 3°15′E). Her crew were rescued by Brompton (United Kingdom). Doris was on a voyage from Sunderland to Rotterdam, South Holland, Netherlands.
Douro	United Kingdom	The ship departed from Wisbech, Cambridgeshire for Goole, Yorkshire. She subsequently foundered in the North Sea of the mouth of the Humber with the loss of all hands.
Mathias and Cecilie	Norway	The ship was wrecked near Ringkøbing, Denmark. She was on a voyage from Havre de Grâce, Seine-Inférieure, France to Fredrikstad.
Powerful	United Kingdom	The ship was destroyed by fire off Great Yarmouth, Norfolk. Her crew were rescued. She was on a voyage from Topsham, Devon to Sunderland.
Rose	United Kingdom	The ship was dismasted and abandoned off Wells-next-the-Sea. She was on a voyage from Boston, Lincolnshire to London.
Staff of Life	United Kingdom	The schooner was wrecked at Caernarfon with the loss of all hands. She was on a voyage from Cork to Liverpool, Lancashire.

== 4 November ==
List of shipwrecks: 4 November 1833
Ship	State	Description
Carl Johan	Sweden	The ship was driven ashore and wrecked near Ringkøbing, Denmark. She was on a voyage from Hull, Yorkshire, United Kingdom to Gothenburg.
Catharine	Belgium	The ship was abandoned off the mouth of the Weser. She was on a voyage from Ghent to Nice, Alpes Maritimes, France.
Cleman et Papil	Russia	The ship was lost in the Zuyder Zee. Her crew were rescued. She was on a voyage from Odesa to Amsterdam, North Holland, Netherlands.
Cornelia	United Kingdom	The ship was driven ashore at Katwijk, North Holland with the loss of a crew member. She was on a voyage from Leith, Lothian to Dordrecht, South Holland.
Grafin Plater	Hamburg	The ship was driven ashore at Noordwijk, South Holland, Netherlands. Her crew were rescued. She was on a voyage from Rio de Janeiro, Brazil to Hamburg.
Lizard	United Kingdom	The ship was lost off "Goree Island". Her crew were rescued. She was on a voyage from Sunderland to Brielle, South Holland.
Romulus	United Kingdom	The ship was wrecked on Voorne, South Holland. Her crew were rescued. She was on a voyage from Stockton on Tees, County Durham to Rotterdam, South Holland.
St. Andrew	United Kingdom	The ship was run down and sunk in the North Sea 2 nautical miles (3.7 km) south of the Nore Lightship ( Trinity House). She was on a voyage from Perth to London.
Two Sisters	United Kingdom	The ship was lost on the Henderd Sandbank. Her crew were rescued. She was on a voyage from Rio de Janeiro to Rotterdam.
Zephyr	United Kingdom	The ship was driven ashore and capsized near "Shalhock, Goree Island". Her crew were rescued. She was on a voyage from Riga, Russia to Bridport, Dorset.

== 5 November ==
List of shipwrecks: 5 November 1833
Ship	State	Description
Ebenezer	United Kingdom	The ship was driven ashore at Spurn Point, Yorkshire. She was on a voyage from Wisbech, Cambridgeshire to Leeds, Yorkshire.
Emanuel	Sweden	The ship was driven ashore at "Imsum", Kingdom of Hanover.
Emperor	United Kingdom	The ship was driven ashore at Spurn Point. She was on a voyage from Spalding, Lincolnshire to Wakefield, Yorkshire.
Gute Hoffnung	Danzig	The ship was lost near Helsingborg, Sweden. Her crew were rescued. She was on a voyage from Portsmouth, Hampshire, United Kingdom to Danzig.
Hoop	Netherlands	The ship was wrecked near Delfzijl, Groningen. Her crew were rescued. She was on a voyage from Stralsund, Prussia to Amsterdam, North Holland.
Jonge Henrick	Kingdom of Hanover	The ship was driven ashore at Cuxhaven. She was on a voyage from Papenburg to Bordeaux, Gironde, France.
Margaret	United Kingdom	The ship was driven ashore at Montreal, Lower Canada, British North America.
Paragon	United Kingdom	The ship was destroyed by fire in the North Sea off The Nore. All sixteen people on board survived.
Sea Flower	United Kingdom	The ship was driven ashore at Spurn Point.
Tees	United Kingdom	The ship was wrecked in the "Goiree Gut". Her crew were rescued. She was on a voyage from Sunderland, County Durham to Rotterdam, South Holland.

== 6 November ==
List of shipwrecks: 6 November 1833
Ship	State	Description
Naiad	United Kingdom	The ship was in collision with another vessel in the North Sea and foundered. Her crew were rescued. She was on a voyage from Stettin, Prussia to London.
Sarah	United Kingdom	The ship foundered in the Wadden Sea between Terschelling and Vlieland, Friesland, Netherlands. Her crew were rescued. She was on a voyage from Newcastle upon Tyne, Northumberland to Great Yarmouth, Norfolk.

== 7 November ==
List of shipwrecks: 7 November 1833
Ship	State	Description
Ann	United Kingdom	The schooner was wrecked on the Isle of Man. Her crew were rescued. She was on a voyage from Drogheda, County Louth to Glasgow, Renfrewshire.
Canning	United Kingdom	The ship was driven ashore at Vangså on the west coast of Jutland between 5 and 7 November. Her crew were rescued. She was on a voyage from Shoreham-by-Sea, Sussex to Kiel, Duchy of Holstein.
Catherine	Sweden	The ship was driven ashore on the west coast of Jutland between 5 and 7 November. Her crew were rescued. She was on a voyage from New York, United States to Gothenburg.
Glory	United Kingdom	The ship was driven ashore at Hjerting, Denmark. She was on a voyage from London to Rostock.
Henry	United Kingdom	The ship was driven ashore at Memel, Prussia. She was reported to have become a wreck by 16 December.
James	United States	The ship foundered whilst on a voyage from St. Jago de Cuba to Philadelphia, Pennsylvania. All on board were rescued.
Phœnix	Netherlands	The ship was driven ashore at Katwijk, North Holland. Her crew were rescued.

== 8 November ==
List of shipwrecks: 8 November 1833
Ship	State	Description
Friends	United Kingdom	The schooner foundered off Peterhead, Aberdeenshire.
John	United Kingdom	The ship struck the Little Malos Reef in the Baltic Sea and was consequently beached near Reval, Russia. She was on a voyage from Saint Petersburg, Russia to London.
Venus	United Kingdom	The ship was driven ashore on Juist, Kingdom of Hanover. She was on a voyage from Heiligenhafen, Duchy of Holstein to London.
Wellington	United Kingdom	The ship struck a reef in Strangford Lough and was consequently beached at Portaferry, County Down.

== 9 November ==
List of shipwrecks: 9 November 1833
Ship	State	Description
Felicity	United Kingdom	The ship was driven ashore at Tarbert, Ayrshire. She was on a voyage from Limerick to London.
New Jersey	United States	The ship was wrecked on the Louisa Shoal, in the South China Sea. Her 24 crew survived. She was on a voyage from Gibraltar to Canton, China.
Vrouw Antje	Netherlands	The ship was driven ashore on Juist, Kingdom of Hanover. She was on a voyage from Danzig, Prussia to Amsterdam, North Holland.
Windsor Castle	United Kingdom	The ship was wrecked on Seskar, Russia. Her crew were rescued. She was on a voyage from Saint Petersburg, Russia to Sunderland, County Durham.

== 10 November ==
List of shipwrecks: 10 November 1833
Ship	State	Description
Stenevent	United Kingdom	The ship sank in River Bay, Jamaica. She was on a voyage from Gonaïves, Haiti to Cork.
Swift	United Kingdom	The ship was destroyed by fire at Ramsgate, Kent.

== 11 November ==
List of shipwrecks: 11 November 1833
Ship	State	Description
Anna Maria	Norway	The ship was damaged by fire in the North Sea with the loss of all but four of her crew. She was on a voyage from Caen, Calvados, France to Christiansand. The wreck was subsequently taken in to Heligoland.
Endeavour	United Kingdom	The ship was driven ashore at Ayr.

== 12 November ==
List of shipwrecks: 12 November 1833
Ship	State	Description
Jane	United Kingdom	The ship ran aground on the Man of War Shoals, in the Atlantic Ocean off Baltimore, Maryland, United States. She was on a voyage from Baltimore to London.

== 14 November ==
List of shipwrecks: 14 November 1833
Ship	State	Description
Greta	Denmark	The ship was driven ashore crewless at Mandø. She was on a voyage from Hadersleben to London, United Kingdom.

== 15 November ==
List of shipwrecks: 15 November 1833
Ship	State	Description
Searcher	United Kingdom	The ship struck the Lever Stones and foundered. Her crew were rescued. She was on a voyage from Cardiff, Glamorgan to London.
Thomas Wallace	United Kingdom	The ship was wrecked in the Saint Lawrence River with the loss of five of her crew.

== 16 November ==
List of shipwrecks: 16 November 1833
Ship	State	Description
Minerva	United States	The ship was driven ashore and sank at Cape Hatteras, North Carolina. Her crew were rescued. She was on a voyage from Málaga, Spain to Philadelphia, Pennsylvania.

== 17 November ==
List of shipwrecks: 17 November 1833
Ship	State	Description
Asia	United Kingdom	The barque was driven ashore and wrecked on the coast of New Orleans Island, Lower Canada, British North America.
HMS Comus	Royal Navy	The Comet-class sloop ran aground on the North Bank, in Liverpool Bay. She was on a voyage from Liverpool, Lancashire to Dublin.
Ranger	United Kingdom	The ship ran aground on the North Bank. She was on a voyage from Liverpool to Rio de Janeiro, Brazil.
Staffette	Russia	The ship was driven ashore at Marstrand, Sweden. She was on a voyage from Liverpool to Pillau.

== 18 November ==
List of shipwrecks: 18 November 1833
Ship	State	Description
John	United Kingdom	The ship struck a sunken wreck in the North Sea 3 nautical miles (5.6 km) off the Inner Dowsing Sandbank and foundered. Her crew were rescued by Coke (United Kingdom).
Joseph	United Kingdom	The ship struck the Seven Stones Reef, in the Atlantic Ocean off the coast of Cornwall and foundered. Her crew were rescued. She was on a voyage from Cardiff, Glamorgan to London.
Ophelia	United Kingdom	The ship departed from Sligo for London. No further trace, presumed foundered with the loss of all hands.

== 19 November ==
List of shipwrecks: 19 November 1833
Ship	State	Description
Corrio de Manilla	(Spain) Spanish East Indies	The ship departed from Singapore for Manila. No further trace, presumed foundered with the loss of all hands.
Lord Kilwarden	United Kingdom	The ship was driven ashore near Workington, Cumberland.

== 20 November ==
List of shipwrecks: 20 November 1833
Ship	State	Description
Julius Cæsar	United Kingdom	The ship was driven ashore at Barnegat, New Jersey, United States. She was on a voyage from Cork to New York, United States.

== 21 November ==
List of shipwrecks: 21 November 1833
Ship	State	Description
Fancy	United Kingdom	The schooner was driven ashore and wrecked at Portsoy, Aberdeenshire. All on board were rescued. She was on a voyage from East Wemyss, Fife to the Spey.
Margaret	United Kingdom	The ship departed from Sunderland, County Durham for Lossiemouth, Inverness-shire. No further trace, presumed foundered in the North Sea with the loss of all hands.
Nimble	United Kingdom	The ship departed from "Callumborg" for London. No further trace, presumed foundered with the loss of all hands.

== 22 November ==
List of shipwrecks: 22 November 1833
Ship	State	Description
John	United Kingdom	The ship struck a reef and capsized at "Paponwickburgh". She was on a voyage from Saint Petersburg, Russia to London.
Juno	United Kingdom	The ship was driven ashore near Malmö, Sweden. Her crew were rescued. She was on a voyage from Newcastle upon Tyne, Northumberland to "Bjornborg".
Mary and Janet	United Kingdom	The ship was driven ashore at Port Ellen, Islay. She was on a voyage from Londonderry to Renfrew.
Nile	United Kingdom	The ship was driven ashore on Oesel, Russia.
Sally	United Kingdom	The ship was lost near Ringkøbing, Denmark. She was on a voyage from Newcastle upon Tyne to London.

== 23 November ==
List of shipwrecks: 23 November 1833
Ship	State	Description
L'Adolphe	France	The ship was driven ashore at Caernarvon, United Kingdom. She was on a voyage from Havre de Grâce, Seine-Inférieure to Liverpool, Lancashire, United Kingdom. Adolphe was refloated on 27 November and taken in to Caernarvon in a severely strained condition.
Martha	United Kingdom	The ship caught fire in the Humber and was beached at Paull, Yorkshire. She was severely damaged. Martha was on a voyage from London to Leeds, Yorkshire.

== 24 November ==
List of shipwrecks: 24 November 1833
Ship	State	Description
Cicero	United States	The schooner was wrecked on Walter's Key with the loss of two lives.
Mary Ann	United Kingdom	The ship was driven ashore and wrecked at Bideford, Devon with the loss of all hands. She was on a voyage from Puerto Cabello, Venezuela to Liverpool, Lancashire.
Young Messenger	United Kingdom	The ship struk the Arklow Banks, in the Irish Sea, and foundered. Her crew were rescued.

== 25 November ==
List of shipwrecks: 25 November 1833
Ship	State	Description
Amethyst	United Kingdom	The brig was driven ashore at Swansea, Glamorgan Her eleven crew were rescued by the pilot cutter William IV (United Kingdom). An attempt was made to refloat her on 28 November, but she sank. She was later refloated.
Cheerly	United Kingdom	The ship sprang a leak and was beached at Hornsea, Yorkshire. Her crew were rescued. She was on a voyage from Newcastle upon Tyne, Northumberland to Honfleur, Calvados, France.
Lord Byron	United Kingdom	The barque was driven ashore in Miramichi Bay.
Mary and Betty	United Kingdom	The ship departed from Campbeltown, Argyllshire for Liverpool, Lancashire. No further trace, presumed foundered in the Irish Sea with the loss of al hands.

== 26 November ==
List of shipwrecks: 26 November 1833
Ship	State	Description
Astrea	United Kingdom	The ship was severely damaged at Trieste.
Eldon	United Kingdom	The ship was severely damaged at Trieste.
Elizabeth and Ann	United Kingdom	The ship capsized at Youghal, County Cork.
George IV	United Kingdom	The ship was severely damaged at Trieste.

== 27 November ==
List of shipwrecks: 27 November 1833
Ship	State	Description
Jessie	United Kingdom	The sloop foundered in the Irish Sea with the lossof all nine people on board. She was on a voyage from Kirkcudbright to Liverpool, Lancashire.
Plywell	United Kingdom	The ship was driven ashore in the Menai Strait. She was on a voyage from Liverpool to Bangor, Caernarfonshire.
Rose	United Kingdom	The ship was driven ashore at Milford Haven, Pembrokeshire. She was on a voyage from Liverpool to New South Wales. Rose was later refloated.

== 28 November ==
List of shipwrecks: 28 November 1833
Ship	State	Description
Adelaide	United States	The barque ran aground on the West Hoyle Bank, in Liverpool Bay. She was on a voyage from Liverpool, Lancashire to Charleston, South Carolina, United States.
Albion	United Kingdom	The ship was wrecked off Padstow, Cornwall with the loss of her captain. She was on a voyage from Youghal, County Cork to Padstow. She was later taken in to Padstow.
Ann	United Kingdom	The sloop foundered off Tenby, Pembrokeshire. Her crew survived. She was on a voyage from St. Clears, Carmarthenshire to Gloucester.
Ann	United Kingdom	The ship was driven ashore at Kronstadt, Russia. She was on a voyage from Kronstadt to Leith, Lothian.
Bee	United Kingdom	The ship was driven ashore at Westport, County Mayo. She was refloated on 12 December.
Canton	United Kingdom	The ship was driven ashore near Wainfleet, Lincolnshire. She was on a voyage from Liverpool to Spalding, Lincolnshire.
Charles	United Kingdom	The ship was driven ashore in Tor Bay, or at Formby. Her crew were rescued. She was on a voyage from Liverpool to Ostend, Belgium.
Cheviot	United Kingdom	The ship was driven ashore in the River Shannon.
Dash	United Kingdom	The ship was wrecked on the coast of Connemara, Ireland with the loss of all but her captain. She was on a voyage from Sligo to London.
Duke of Wellington	United Kingdom	The ship foundered in Liverpool Bay with the loss of all five crew. She was on a voyage from Liverpool to Wexford.
Eleanor	United Kingdom	The ship was driven ashore at Liverpool. She was on a voyage from Liverpool to Londonderry.
Elizabeth	United Kingdom	The ship was driven ashore at Westport. She was refloated on 8 December.
Eugène Rosalie	France	The sloop was driven ashore and wrecked at Shakespeare Cliffs, 2 nautical miles (3.7 km) west of Dover, Kent. She was on a voyage from Dunkirk, Nord to Havre de Grâce, Seine-Inférieure.
Good Intent	United Kingdom	The ship was wrecked on the Cutler Sand, in the North Sea. She was on a voyage from South Shields, County Durham to London.
Heart of Oak	United Kingdom	The ship was driven ashore at Liverpool. She was on a voyage from Liverpool to Amlwch, Anglesey.
Hulan	United Kingdom	The ship was driven ashore and wrecked near Donegal. She was on a voyage from Ayr to Londonderry.
Kingston	United States	The ship was driven ashore and wrecked at Sandgate, Kent. Her crew were rescued. She was on a voyage from Quebec City, Lower Canada, British North America to London.
Langton	United Kingdom	The ship was driven ashore near Galway. She was on a voyage from Leith, Lothian to Saint Vincent.
Marquis of Anglesey	United Kingdom	The ship departed from Liverpool for Belfast, County Antrim. No further trace, presumed foundered in the Irish Sea with the loss of all hands.
Rose in June	United Kingdom	The ship was driven ashore at Liverpool. She was on a voyage from Liverpool to Caernarfon.
Tritons	United Kingdom	The ship was driven ashore at Liverpool. She was on a voyage from Liverpool to Conway, Caernarfonshire.
Velocity	United Kingdom	The ship foundered in Swansea Bay. She was on a voyage from Cardiff to Tralee, County Kerry. Velocity was refloated on 10 December and taken in to Swansea, Glamorgan.
Venture	United Kingdom	The ship sank at Hoylake, Cheshire with the loss of all hands. She was on a voyage from Liverpool to Parkgate, Cheshire.

== 29 November ==
List of shipwrecks: 29 November 1833
Ship	State	Description
Abeona	United Kingdom	The ship was driven ashore and wrecked at Caernarfon with the loss of a crew member. She was on a voyage from Newry, County Down to London.
Amity	United Kingdom	The ship was driven ashore at Holyhead, Anglesey. She was on a voyage from Newport, Monmouthshire to Liverpool, Lancashire.
Argo	United Kingdom	The brig was driven ashore at Sligo.
Charles	United Kingdom	The ship was driven ashore at Formby, Lancashire her crew were rescued. She was on a voyage from Liverpool to Ostend, West Flanders, Belgium.
Colchester	United Kingdom	The ship was wrecked near Formby. Her crew were rescued. She was on a voyage from Tatamagouche, Nova Scotia, British North America to Liverpool.
Content	United Kingdom	The ship was driven ashore at Pwllheli, Caernarvonshire. Her crew were rescued. She was on a voyage from Fowey, Cornwall to Liverpool.
Cygnet	United Kingdom	The ship was driven ashore at Pwllheli. Her crew were rescued. She was on a voyage from Cardiff, Glamorgan to Liverpool.
Elizabeth	United Kingdom	The sloop was wrecked at the mouth of the River Dee with the loss of five of her seven crew.
Euphemia	United Kingdom	The brig was driven ashore at Sligo.
Fame	United Kingdom	The ship was wrecked near Caernarfon. She was on a voyage from Bridgwater, Somerset to Greenock, Renfrewshire.
Fame	United Kingdom	The sloop was scuttled at Troon.
Friends	United Kingdom	The ship was driven ashore in Loch Indaal. She was on a voyage from Saltcoats, Ayrshire to an Irish port. Friends was later refloated.
Glasgow	United Kingdom	The steamship was driven ashore at Sligo.
Good intent	United Kingdom	The pilot boat was driven ashore at Formby with the loss of twelve of the 21 people on board.
Hero	United Kingdom	The ship was scuttled at Caernarfon. Her crew were rescued. She was on a voyage from Newport to Liverpool.
Hope	United Kingdom	The ship was driven ashore at Pwllheli. Her crew were rescued. She was on a voyage from Liverpool to Fernando Po. Hope was subsequently condemned.
Hope	United Kingdom	The ship was driven ashore at "Piel Point" and was abandoned by her crew. She was on a voyage from Dublin to London.
Jean	United Kingdom	The sloop was driven ashore north of Troon, Ayrshire. Her three crew were rescued.
Joseph	United Kingdom	The ship was wrecked in the Bristol Channel off Newport, Monmouthshire. Her crew were rescued.
Kate	United Kingdom	The schooner was wrecked at the mouth of the River Dee. Her crew were rescued.
Kilmarnock	United Kingdom	The brig was scuttled at Troon.
Kitty and Molly	United Kingdom	The ship was wrecked at Ayr with the loss of her captain. She was on a voyage from Glasgow, Renfrewshire to Port Nessock, Wigtownshire.
Malvina	United Kingdom	The brig sank off Southport, Lancashire with the loss of all nine hands. She was on a voyage from Cork to Liverpool.
Margaret	United Kingdom	The ship struck a rock and was wrecked at Nairn with the loss of two lives.
Maria	United Kingdom	The ship was driven at Tramore, County Waterford. Her crew were rescued. She was on a voyage from Glasgow to Limerick.
Mary Ann	United Kingdom	The ship capsized in the Atlantic Ocean off Penzance, Cornwall. She was on a voyage from Cape Breton Island, Nova Scotia, British North America to Limerick.
Merope	United Kingdom	The ship was driven ashore and capsized at Itchen Ferry, Hampshire.
Orwell	United Kingdom	The ship was driven ashore at Jurby Head, Isle of Man. Her crew were rescued. She was on a voyage from Liverpool to New Orleans, Louisiana, United States. Orwell was refloated on 28 December and taken in to Ramsey, Isle of Man.
Panmure	United Kingdom	The brig was driven ashore at Ayr with the loss of a crew member. One of the rescuers also died.
Prosperity	United Kingdom	The ship was driven ashore at Pwllheli. Her crew were rescued.
Queen Adelaide	United Kingdom	The ship was driven ashore at Ayr. Her crew were rescued.
Ranger	United Kingdom	The ship was abandoned off Fishguard, Pembrokeshire. Her crew were rescued by the Fishguard Lifeboat. Ranger was later taken in to Fishguard.
Resolution	United Kingdom	The sloop was wrecked at the mouth of the River Dee with the loss of all but her captain.
Rover	United Kingdom	The ship was driven ashore in Loch Indaal. She was on a voyage from Ayr to Wexford.
Sally	United Kingdom	The brig was wrecked at Caernarfon with the loss of all hands.
Sally	United Kingdom	The ship was driven ashore in Loch Indaal. She was on a voyage from Glasgow to Limerick. Sally was later refloated.
Superb	United Kingdom	The ship was drivwen ashore near Copenhagen, Denmark. She was on a voyage from Kokkola, Grand Duchy of Finland to London.
Susan	United Kingdom	The ship was wrecked at Caernarfon. Her crew were rescued by the Caernarfon Lifeboat. She was on a voyage from Liverpool to Marseille, Bouches-du-Rhône, France.
Thorneyclose	United Kingdom	The brig was driven ashore at Glasgow.
Treckvogel	Netherlands	The ship was wrecked at Liverpool. She was on a voyage from Holyhead to Dordrecht, South Holland.
Venus	Norway	The ship was driven ashore near Galway. She was on a voyage from Bergen to Livorno, Grand Duchy of Tuscany.
Venus	United Kingdom	The ship foundered in St Brides Bay. She was on a voyage from Liverpool to Fowey.

== 30 November ==
List of shipwrecks: 30 November 1833
Ship	State	Description
Ann Jamison	United Kingdom	The brig was destroyed by fire and an explosion at Sydney, New South Wales with the loss of eight lives.
Marie Antoinette	Denmark	The ship was driven ashore near "Ulesund". She was on a voyage from Samsø to Hull, Yorkshire, United Kingdom.

== Unknown date ==
List of shipwrecks: Unknown date 1833
Ship	State	Description
Acorn	United Kingdom	The ship was driven ashore on Walney Island, Lancashire. She was on a voyage from Liverpool, Lancashire to Ballina, County Mayo.
Active	United Kingdom	The ship was wrecked on the Stray Rocks. Her crew were rescued. She was on a voyage from Neath, Glamorgan to Dartmouth, Devon.
Adolph	France	The ship was driven ashore at Caernarfon. She was on a voyage from Havre de Grâce, Seine-Inférieure, to Liverpool.
Ariel	United Kingdom	The collier foundered in the Scheldt at Berchem, Belgium with the loss of six of her seven crew. The survivor was rescued by the Vlissingen pilot boat. She was on a voyage from Sunderland, County Durham to Schiedam, South Holland, Netherlands.
Bee	United Kingdom	The ship was driven ashore at Wainfleet, Lincolnshire. She was on a voyage from Wisbech, Cambridgeshire to Hull.
Betsey	United Kingdom	The ship was driven ashore and wrecked at Port St. Mary, Isle of Man before 5 November. Her crew were rescued.
Betsey Dryden	United Kingdom	The ship was driven ashore on Saltholm, Denmark. She was on a voyage from Saint Petersburg, Russian Empire to London.
Billow	(United Kingdom of Great Britain and Ireland) British North America	The ship was driven ashore at Dunree, County Donegal, United Kingdom.
Ceres	United Kingdom	The ship was driven ashore and wrecked at Kilnsea, Yorkshire. Her crew were rescued.
Charles Adrian	France	The ship was wrecked in the Gulf of Salonica in late November. She was on a voyage from Marseille, Bouches-du-Rhône to Salonica, Greece.
City of Limerick	United Kingdom	The ship foundered off Kerry Head, County Kerry. Her crew were rescued. She was on a voyage from Limerick to London.
Diana	United Kingdom	The ship departed from Limerick in late November for the Clyde. No further trace, presumed foundered with the loss of all hands.
Eleanor	United Kingdom	The ship was lost on the Reuda Sandbank. Her crew were rescued. She was on a voyage from Odesa to Amsterdam.
Frau Gesina	Hamburg	The ship was wrecked at Dorum, Kingdom of Hanover. Her crew were rescued. She was on a voyage from Altona to Norden, Kingdom of Hanover.
Glory	United Kingdom	The ship was wrecked near the Horn Reef, in the North Sea off the coast of Jutland. Her crew were rescued.
Good Haab	flag unknown	The ship was wrecked on the Schau Reef. She was on a voyage from Gothenburg, Sweden to Mandal, Norway.
Heylwina	(Denmark) Duchy of Schleswig	The ship was driven ashore on Sylt. Her crew were rescued.
Hill	United Kingdom	The ship was driven ashore and wrecked near Beaumaris, Anglesey. She was on a voyage from Newry, County Antrim to Liverpool.
Hoffnung		The ship was lost whilst on a voyage from Newcastle upon Tyne, Northumberland, United Kingdom to Bremen. Her crew were rescued.
Hyburnia	Kingdom of Hanover	The ship was wrecked on Amrum. Her crew were rescued. She was on a voyage from Newcastle upon Tyne to Emden.
James and Margaret	United Kingdom	The ship was abandoned whilst on a voyage from Hamburg to Gothenburg, Sweden. Her crew were rescued. She later came ashore on the coast of Jutland.
Jane	United Kingdom	The ship foundered off Southport, Lancashire.
Jessie	United Kingdom	The ship was abandoned in the North Sea off Thisted, Denmark between 5 and 7 November with the loss of a crew member. She was on a voyage from Hamburg to Inverkeithing, Fife. Jessie subsequently came ashore near Thisted.
Jesús María	Spain	The ship was wrecked on Juist, Kingdom of Hanover with the loss of all but one of her crew. She was on a voyage from Bergen, Norway to Bilbao.
Mary	United Kingdom	The brig was abandoned whilst on a voyage from Fowey, Cornwall to Newcastle upon Tyne. Her crew were rescued by Albion (United Kingdom)
Malvina	United Kingdom	The ship was driven ashore on the Swedish coast. She was later refloated and taken in to Karlshamn, where she sank. Malvina was on a voyage from Riga, Russia to London.
Matilda	United Kingdom	The ship was driven ashore and wrecked in the Sound of Sanda. She was on a voyage from Newcastle upon Tyne to Londonderry.
Micromegas	United Kingdom	The ship was lost at Newfoundland before 30 November.
Miser	United Kingdom	The ship was wrecked on Flat Island, Newfoundland, British North America. She was on a voyage from Bordeaux, Gironde, France to Quebec City, Lower Canada, British North America.
Providentia	Norway	The ship was abandoned in the Kattegat. She was later taken in to a port on Skagen, Denmark.
Rose of Sharon	United Kingdom	The ship was wrecked on Spurn Point, Yorkshire. Her crew were rescued. She was on a voyage from Newcastle upon Tyne, Northumberland to Grimsby, Lincolnshire.
Rowey	United Kingdom	The ship foundered in the Irish Sea off Holyhead, Anglesey.
Sarah	United Kingdom	The ship foundered in the North Sea off the mouth of the Humber. Her crew were rescued. She was on a voyage from Spalding, Lincolnshire to Goole, East Riding of Yorkshire.
Sheffield	United Kingdom	The ship was lost on or before 5 November whilst on a voyage from Wisbech to Sheffield, Yorkshire.
St. Adrien	France	The ship was driven ashore near Thisted between 5 and 7 November. Her crew were rescued. She was on a voyage from Gothenburg to a French port.
Twe Geschwisters	Rostock	The ship foundered in the North Sea off Cuxhaven, Kingdom of Hanover. She was on a voyage from Rostock to Amsterdam.
Vrow Gesina	Netherlands	The ship was driven ashore at Norden, Kingdom of Hanover before 9 November. She was on a voyage from "Hockzyl" to Groningen.
