= Hugh Crawford (1813 ship) =

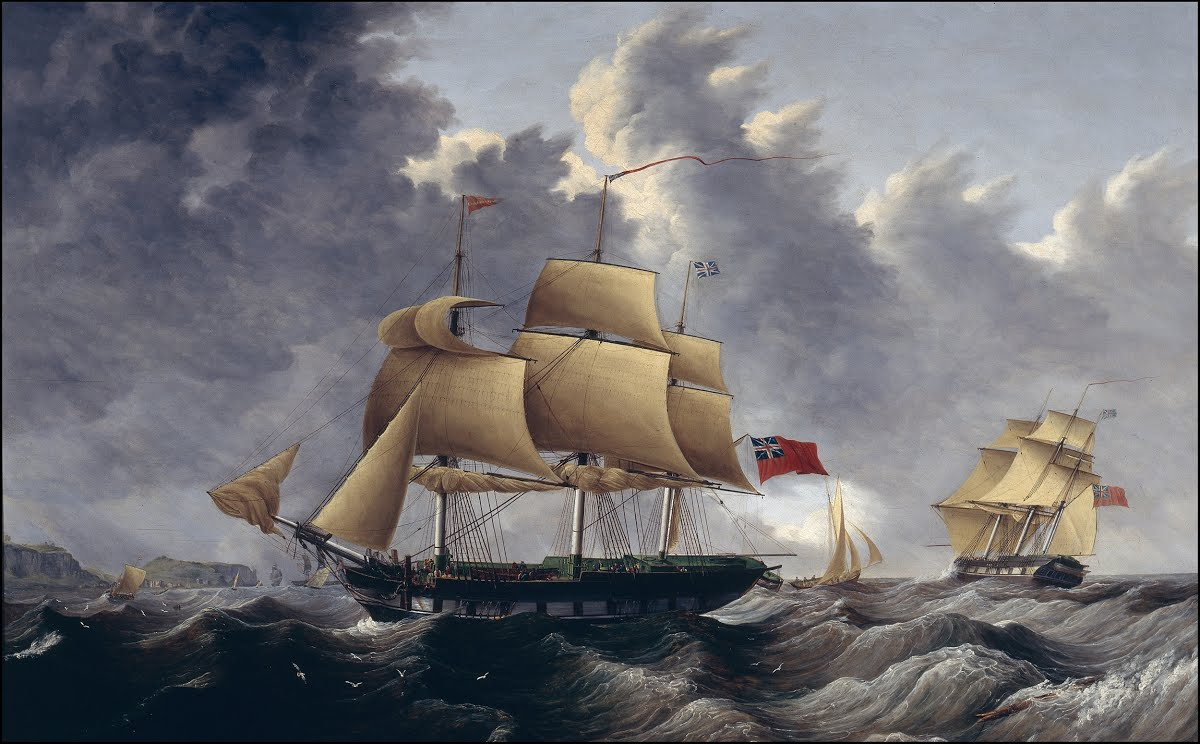
- Hugh Crawford in two positions off a rocky coast; George L. Tuthill (1824), Australian National Maritime Museum

History

United States
- Name: Orbit
- Launched: 1810
- Captured: 29 January 1813

United Kingdom
- Name: Hugh Crawford
- Acquired: 1813 by purchase of a prize
- Fate: Last listed 1833

General characteristics
- Tons burthen: 366, or 374, or 390 bm)
- Propulsion: Sail
- Armament: 6 × 9-pounder guns

Hugh Crawford was launched in 1810, in the United States as Orbit. The British Royal Navy captured her in 1813. She was sold as a prize and her purchasers renamed her Hugh Crawford. She traded with India and Australia and thrice carried free immigrants to New South Wales under private charter. She was one of the first ships to do so. She was last listed in 1833, but with data stale since 1827.

== Career ==
On 29 January 1813, HMS Achates captured the American ship Orbit, of 390 tons (bm), six guns, and 25 men. Orbit was sailing from New York to Bordeaux with a cargo of cotton, pearl, and potash. She had been launched in 1810, at New York.

She was sold as a prize and her new owners named her Hugh Crawford. She entered Lloyd's Register (LR) in 1813, with Niels, master, Crawford, owner, and trade Plymouth-West Indies.

What enables one to make the link between Orbit and Hugh Crawford is a mistake in the Register of Shipping (RS) in 1814. It mistakenly carried both Hugh Crawford and Orbit, the publishers not realizing that Orbit had become Hugh Crawford.

Ship	Master	Owner	Trade	Source & notes
Hugh Crawford	W.Neills; W.Hughes	Crawford	Belfast–Jamaica	LR; 374 tons (bm)
Hugh Crawford	Neills	Crawford	Plymouth–West Indies	RS; 374 tons (bm)
Orbit	Neale	Crawford	Plymouth–West Indies	RS; 390 tons (bm)

In September 1815, Hugh Crawford arrived at Bristol. She had left Honduras on 1 August, in company with Samuel and Sarah, bound for London, and Regent, bound for Hull.

Year	Master	Owner	Trade	Source
1815	W.Hughes	Crawford	Belfast–Jamaica	LR
1819	W.Athol; Halliday	Stewart & Co	Greenock–Calcutta	LR

In 1813, the EIC had lost its monopoly on the trade between India and Britain. British ships were then free to sail to India or the Indian Ocean under a license from the EIC. W. Athol sailed Hugh Crawford from London on 17 April 1818.

Hugh Crawford, Athol, master, returned to the Clyde on 22 March 1819. She had left Bengal on 3 November 1818, and the Sand Heads on the 11th. She was at St Helena on 15 January 1819. On 10 February, on her way home she encountered a Buenos Ayrean privateer. The privateer wanted to put 38 Spanish prisoners on Hugh Crawford but Athol refused to take them.

The Register of Shipping still carried both Hugh Crawford and Orbit in 1820, but the data for Orbit was stale. On 28 January 1820, Lloyd's List (LL) reported that Hugh Crawford, Holliday, master, had been sailing from Charleston to Greenock when on 20 January, she had struck on some rocks in the Clyde, about six miles from Dunoon. LL reported that she was totally wrecked and her cargo, though salvageable, was in a severely distressed state. The news of her loss proved to be exaggerated. By 1821, she was again appearing in LL's ship arrival and departure (SAD) data.

Ship	Master	Owner	Trade	Source & notes
Hugh Crawford	J.Halliday	"Stqwrt&Co"	Greenock–Christiania, Norway	LR; 374 tons (bm)
Hugh Crawford	Halliday	Crawford	Liverpool–Charleston	RS; 374 tons (bm)
Orbit	Neale	Crawford	Plymouth–West Indies	RS; 390 tons (bm)

By the 1825 issue, Orbit had disappeared from the RS, and both registers were in essential agreement on Hugh Crawford.

Year	Master	Owner	Trade	Source & notes
1825	Langton	McClick & Co	London–Van Diemen's Land	LR; 366 tons (bm)
1825	Langdon	Campell	London–New South Wales	RS; 366 tons (bm)

Hugh Crawford made three voyages carrying emigrants from England to Australia. She also carried such cargo as sheep, horned cattle, horses, mail, merchant goods, and timber.

On 20 November 1823, she was at St Helena, on her way back to England from Valparaiso. She arrived at London on 15 January 1824, with Wilson, master.

Thomas Potter Macqueen chartered Hugh Crawford to carry emigrants from England to New South Wales. She was reportedly the first privately chartered vessel to carry free settlers to New South Wales. Previously, free settlers had arrived as passengers on board vessels transportingconvicts. Later, Macqueen also chartered Nimrod to perform the same service.

On 5 December 1824, Hugh Crawford was at Portsmouth on her way to New South Wales with Langdon, master. She arrived at the Cape Verde islands on 31 December, and left for New South Wales on 4 January 1825. She arrived at Sydney on Sunday 3 April. She had carried 57 settlers, five of whom disembarked at Van Diemen's Land. She also brought 122 sheep and eight head of horned cattle.

From Sydney Hugh Crawford sailed on 10 June, to Batavia, Dutch East Indies, via the Torres Islands. She sailed in company with Asia and Hercules. Hugh Crawford arrived at Batavia on 2 July. Her arrival coincided with the outbreak of the Java War. On 3 July, she sailed for Singapore. She arrived at Deal from Sincapore on 19 January 1826.

On 23 June, Langdon sailed from Gravesend and on the 27th from Deal, bound for New South Wales. On 27 July, Hugh Crawford reached Santiago, Cape Verde. She arrived at Sydney on 22 November. On 26 December, a sudden shift of the wind pushed her aground. She sustained little damage, but Langdon published a letter in The Australian thanking the commanders of HMS Warspite and Volage for the assistance they had rendered. Langdon had apparently brought a band for the amusement of his passengers, which band also played in Sydney, as did the band of Warspite.

On 23 March 1827, Langdon sailed Hugh Crawford from Hobart, Tasmania, en route to England via Cape Horn. She arrived at the Falkland Islands on 22 May, after having become becalmed off Cape Horn for five weeks. Hugh Crawford sailed from the Falklands on 25 May.

== Fate ==
Hugh Crawford was last listed in 1833, but with data unchanged since 1827.
