= Soham (disambiguation) =

Soham is a small town in the English county of Cambridgeshire.

Soham may also refer to:

- Soham (given name), for several people named Soham
- Soham (Sanskrit), a Hindu mantra
- Soham railway station, a station serving Soham, Cambridgeshire
- Soham, New Mexico, United States, an unincorporated community
- Soham TV, a Hindi-language 24/7 television channel

== See also ==
- Earl Soham, Suffolk, England
- Monk Soham, Suffolk, England
