= Coldstream (1788 ship) =

History

Great Britain
- Name: Coldstream
- Namesake: Coldstream
- Owner: Mather & Co.
- Launched: 1788, Shields
- Captured: June 1805

General characteristics
- Tons burthen: 298 (bm)
- Armament: 6 × 6-pounder guns

Coldstream was launched at Shields in 1788, probably under another name. She first appeared under the Coldstream name in Lloyd's Register in 1800; her earlier history is currently obscure. Between 1801 and 1805, she made two voyages to the southern whale fishery. A French privateer captured her in 1805 during the second.

== Career ==
Coldstream entered Lloyd's Register in 1800 with J. Gilchrist, master, Mather & Co., owners, and trade London transport. The next year her master became Andrews or Anderson, and her trade London–Cape of Good Hope.

On 7 June 1801, Coldstream, Anderson, master, sailed from Deal for the Cape of Good Hope (CGH). On 21 June she sailed from Gravesend for the CGH. Lloyd's List reported on 5 January 1802 that she had arrived at the CGH. It then reported on 20 August 1802 that she arrived at the CGH from the South Seas. From the CGH she sailed to St Helena and Cowes, and on 1 October she arrived at Gravesend. Commerce was valued in 1802 at £6,600.

On 16 December, Coldstream, Dunn, master, remained at Deal, bound for the South Seas. The next day Dunn sailed Coldstream on a whaling voyage to the Brazil Banks. Although she sailed for the Brazil Banks, by 1803 she was at the Galápagos Islands. Coldstream and Backhouse were well off the coast of "Chili" in July and August. Coldstream, Backhouse, and Wilding were next reported "all well" at the "Gallipagos" by 4 October.

In February 1805, Coldstream was rounding Cape Horn.

== Fate ==
Lloyd's List reported that the French privateer Bellone, had captured Coldstream, Dunn, master, in June 1805 in sight of St Helena. Coldstream's crew were landed there. Dunn and his crew were in two boats and they arrived at St Helena on 24 June 1805.

== Lloyd's Register ==
Information in Lloyd's Register and the Register of Shipping was only as accurate as owners of vessel chose to keep it.

Year	Master	Owner	Trade	Source
1800	J.Gilchrist	Mather & Co.	London transport	LR
1801	J. Gilchrist; Andrews	Mather & Co.	London transport London–Cape of Good Hope	LR
1805	Andrews	Mather & Co.	London–Cape of Good Hope	LR
