= Cambridge (1803 ship) =

History

United Kingdom
- Name: Cambridge
- Namesake: Cambridge
- Owner: Various
- Builder: Francis Hurry, Howdon, or Newcastle upon Tyne
- Launched: 19 August 1803
- Fate: Sunk May 1841

General characteristics
- Tons burthen: 308, or 309 (bm)
- Length: 95 ft 5 in (29.1 m)
- Beam: 27 ft 4 in (8.3 m)
- Complement: 40
- Armament: 16 × 6-pounder guns + 4 swivel guns

Cambridge was launched in 1803, at Howdon, Newcastle upon Tyne. She made one or two voyages as whaler and then became a West Indiaman, and later traded across the Atlantic and with the Baltic. In 1814, she repelled an attack by a privateer in a single-ship action. She was sunk in May 1841, while returning to Newcastle from Russia.

== Career ==
Cambridge's first owner was Lord Camelford, a particularly violent former naval officer. When Camelford died three days after being wounded in a duel on 7 March 1804. His whalers, Cambridge, Wilding (or Willding), and Caerwent passed to Lord Grenville, a relative by marriage, who sold them when they returned from their voyages.

Whaler: Captain Benjamin Thompson acquired a letter of marque on 30 January 1804. In February, he sailed from London, bound for the Galápagos Islands. On 29 May, Cambridge and Caerwent were at Rio de Janeiro. They were later reported to have arrived at Hood Island.

Cambridge was again at Rio in July 1806, requiring food, water, and calefaction. This may have represented a second voyage. At some point her captains were reported as Buves, and Anthony. On 5 December 1806, Lloyd's List reported that Cambridge, Thompson, late master, and Caerwent, Anthony, master, were at the Cape of Good Hope,

Cambridge returned to London on 12 May 1807. Lloyd's Register for 1807, still showed her master as Thompson, her owner as Rodgers, and her trade as London–South Seas.

West Indiaman and general trader Lloyd's List reported on 24 June 1808, that Cambridge, Sullivan, master, had had to put back into Havana, having been run into.

On 6 January 1814, Cambridge, Evans, master, arrived at Havana. She had repelled an attack by a Carthaginian privateer schooner of one gun and 80 men near Morro Castle (Havana). Two hours later the privateer captured a ship. (Note: Nineteenth-century South American insurgent privateers, particularly those hailing from Cartagena, Colombia, and flying the insurgent flag were often called "Carthaginians".)

On 6 May 1825, Cambridge, Mason, master, rescued the crew and their belongings from the leaky and sinking Albert, Dixon, master. Both vessels were sailing to London, Cambridge from Jamaica and Albert from Virginia when Cambridge came upon Albert at 46°N 32°W. Albert had four feet of water in her hold that was rising at 18" per hour, even with her pumps working.

Year	Master	Owner	Trade	Source and notes
1805	Longridge	F. Hurry & Co.	Newcastle–London	Register of Shipping (RS)
1810	Sullivan; J. Evans	H.Fletcher	London–Jamaica	RS
1815	J.Evans	H.Fletcher	London–Havana; London–Petersburg	RS; small repairs 1814
1820	Langdon	H.Fletcher	London–Jamaica	RS; small repairs 1816
1825	Mason	H.Fletcher	London–Jamaica	RS; large repairs 1822
1830	Thompson	Thompson & Co.	London–Quebec	SR; small repairs 1826 & 1830
1836	Anderson	Thompson & Co.	Newcastle–Baltic	Lloyd's Register (LR); small repairs 1836
1840	Beautyman	Thomson & Co.	Newcastle–London	LR; small repairs 1836 & 1839

== Fate ==
Cambridge was last listed in Lloyd's Register in 1841, with the annotation "SUNK". She was sunk on 2 (or 4) May 1841, by ice in the Baltic Sea. A Russian ship rescued the crew. Cambridge was on a voyage from Reval, Russia to Newcastle upon Tyne.
