= Wilding (1788 ship) =

1788–1824 ship launched in Liverpool

History

Great Britain
- Name: Wilding
- Namesake: Richard Wilding (18th Century Liverpool merchant)
- Owner: Atkinson
- Builder: Liverpool
- Launched: 1788
- Captured: 1798

France
- Name: Wilding
- Acquired: Early 1798 by capture
- Captured: December 1798

Great Britain
- Name: Wilding
- Owner: 1799:John St Barbe; 1805:C. Bent; Thereafter:Various
- Acquired: 1799 by purchase of a prize
- Fate: Abandoned September 1824

General characteristics
- Tons burthen: 250, or 266, or 269, or 280, or 282, or 300 (bm)
- Complement: 1796:20; 1804:25
- Armament: 1796:14 × 6-pounder guns; 1804:12 × 9&4-pounder guns + 2 swivel guns; 1806:6 × 18-pounder carronades
- Notes: Two decks

Wilding (or Willding) was launched at Liverpool in 1788 and spent much of her career as a West Indiaman, sailing between Liverpool and Jamaica. During this time, in November 1794, she participated in a single-ship action during which her opponent, a French privateer, blew up. In 1798 after a series of captures and recaptures she briefly became a transport for the French Navy, but a final recapture returned her to British hands. Later, she made one voyage to the South Pacific as a whaler, and one voyage to the Cape of Good Hope as a victualler for the 1795-1796 invasion of the Cape. She traded with the West Indies, Africa, the United States, and Russia. Her crew abandoned her in September 1824, dismasted and in a sinking state.

== Career ==
=== West Indiaman ===
Wilding entered Lloyd's Register in 1789 with J. Atkinson, master, M(oses) Benson, owner, and trade Liverpool–Jamaica. In 1792 G. Pemberton replaced Atkinson as Wilding's master.

On 20 November 1795, Wilding was on her way to Jamaica when she encountered a French privateer of 18 guns and a large crew. An engagement of two hours ensued. Suddenly the privateer blew up, causing the loss of her entire crew. However, Captain George Pemberton, of Wilding, was killed in the action. Moses Benson, Wilding's owner, had an engraved tablet placed in St James' Church, in Pemberton's memory.

Captain Henry Ward, Wilding's next master, acquired a letter of marque on 15 November 1796.

On 2 February 1798, as Wilding was returning to England from Jamaica the French privateer D'Gaytrouin (Dugay Trouin) captured her off Cape Clear. (HMS Shannon captured Duguay Trouin the same day but was unable to recapture Wilding. Twenty-three of Wilding's crew were aboard Duguay Trouin.) The British recaptured Wilding, but the French then recaptured her again and took her into Brest.

=== French Navy & recapture ===
The French Navy took Wilding into service as a transport, retaining her name.

On 28 December HMS Spitfire captured the 14-gun transport Wilding, of 400 tons (bm), in the Bay of Biscay. Wilding's crew consisted of seamen from three French ships of the line and she had been taking firewood for the French Navy from Aber Wrac'h to Brest under the escort of Levrette, a gun vessel from which she had parted company. The report of her recapture noted that Wilding had been a British ship in the West Indies trade before the French had captured her.

=== British merchantman ===
Wilding reappears in Lloyd's Register in 1799 with E. Sparks, master, John St Barbe, owner, and trade London–Leghorn. By 1802 she was trading with Martinique.

=== Whaler ===
In 1803 St Barbe sent Wilding on a whaling voyage. She was at Rio de Janeiro in February 1803 where she replenished her water and replaced an anchor that she had lost. She was reported to have been "all well" at the Galapagos Islands on 4 October 1803, in company with Backhouse and Coldstream, and off the coast of Peru in April 1804. Her master's name is variously given as Belinder or Borlander, or John Barlinder. Captain John Barlinder acquired a letter of marque on 25 April 1804. Wilding returned to Great Britain on 7 April 1805.

One of Willding's owners was Lord Camelford. Camelford died three days after being wounded in a duel on 7 March 1804. His whalers, Wilding, Cambridge, and Caerwent passed to Lord Grenville, a relative by marriage, who sold his ownership when they returned from their voyages.

=== Victualer ===
St Barbe sold Wilding to C. Bent, who employed her as a London-based transport. Her master was W. Bushell. (Lloyd's Register gives the name of her new master as Merman and her new owner as Edwin.)

In the autumn of 1805 a small naval squadron under the orders of Commodore Sir Home Popham escorted a fleet of transports and East Indiamen carrying some 5000 soldiers under the command of Major-general Sir David Baird to attack the Dutch at the Cape of Good Hope. Wilding was part of the force, serving as a victualler.

The fleet assembled at Madeira and touched at St. Salvador to replenish supplies. The expedition sailed again on the 26 November, and on 4 January 1806, in the evening, anchored to the west of Robben Island, preparatory to taking the Dutch colony. On 21 March 1806 Wilding was in a convoy to the UK with invalids and Dutch prisoners.

=== Merchantman ===
By 1807 Wilding's master was Freeman, her owner Marman, and her trade London–Demarara. On 30 January 1807 Wilding sailed from Demerara, bound for London.

In 1809, Wilding's master changed from Marman to Campion, her owner from Manning to Swanzea, and her trade from London–Africa to London-Surinam. She had undergone a thorough repair in 1808.

In 1814–1815, Wilding's master changed from W. Gibson to Kensman and her trade from Plymouth–Africa to Liverpool–"Savana".

Wilding, Gibson, master, had left Plymouth on 21 December 1814 with the missionary William Davies, and several members of the Church Missionary Society. She arrived at Sierra Leone on 13 February 1815, and Gibson died of a fever on 20 February.

On 1 December 1815, Wilding Kingsman, master, arrived at Liverpool from Archangel. In coming into the King's Dock pier, she drove the fluke of one of her anchors into her hull at the bow; she took on 12 feet of water in her hold.

On 2 April 1818 a heavy sea struck Wilding, Kinsman, master, as she was sailing from Honduras to England. She put into Plymouth on 12 April leaky, having also lost her foremast, bowsprit, etc.

== Fate ==
Wilding, Richardson, master, foundered on 14 September 1824 at 32°N 79°W in the Atlantic Ocean with the loss of three of her crew. She was on a voyage from British Honduras to Cork. The surviving crew members were landed at Charleston.

A more detailed account has Wilding leaving Honduras on 25 August and encountering a gale off Charleston on 14 September. She filled with water and fell on her side, at which time two seamen and a cabin-boy drowned. She righted herself shortly thereafter, having lost her masts. Captain Richardson and the surviving crew members remained on board until 16 September. They fashioned a raft and set out for shore. On their way they encountered the pilot boat Friends, which brought them ashore.
