= HMS Nimrod =

Six ships of the Royal Navy, and one shore establishment, have borne the name HMS Nimrod, after the biblical figure of Nimrod:

- HMS Nimrod (1799) was an 18-gun sloop, previously the French ship Éole. HMS Solebay captured her in 1799 and the Royal Navy sold her in 1811. She then became a whaler, undertaking three whaling voyages between 1811 and 1819.
- HMS Nimrod (1812) was an 18-gun Cruizer-class brig-sloop launched in 1812 and wrecked in 1827 when she was driven ashore after her anchor broke; she was refloated and brought into dock where she was sold later that year. She first appears in Lloyd's Register for 1828 after having been lengthened and raised, and having undergone a large repair. In 1841, under the command of Captain Manning, she transported assisted emigrants from Liverpool to Port Phillip (Melbourne) and Sydney. She is last listed in 1851.
- HMS Nimrod (1828) was a 20-gun sloop, previously a sixth rate named HMS Andromeda. She was renamed in 1827, before being launched in 1828. She was used as a coal hulk from 1853, being renamed C 1, and then C76. She was eventually sold in 1907.
- HMS Nimrod (1839) was an iron paddle gunboat launched in 1839, re-erected at Basra in 1840 and on the Navy lists until 1859.
- HMS Nimrod (1856) was a wood screw gunboat launched in 1856 and sold in 1865.
- HMS Nimrod (1915) was a Marksman-class (also known as Lightfoot-class) flotilla leader launched in 1915 and sold in 1926.
- HMS Nimrod (1940) was a shore establishment at Campbeltown, Argyll. Principal Asdic training school for officers and men from early 1940.

During the French Revolutionary and Napoleonic Wars the Admiralty also made use of hired armed cutters with the name of Nimrod.

== See also ==
- List of ships named Nimrod
- The 2018 animated film Sherlock Gnomes, includes an HMS Nimrod, which resembles a Zumwalt-class destroyer.

== Sources ==
- Colledge, J. J.; Warlow, Ben (2006) [1969]. Ships of the Royal Navy: The Complete Record of All Fighting Ships of the Royal Navy from the 15th Century to the Present (3rd Rev ed.). London: Chatham Publishing. ISBN 978-1-86176-281-8. OCLC 67375475.
