= William Barnard (shipbuilder) =

English shipbuilder

William Barnard (1735–1795) was an 18th-century English shipbuilder serving the Royal Navy and the British East India Company (EIC).

== Life ==
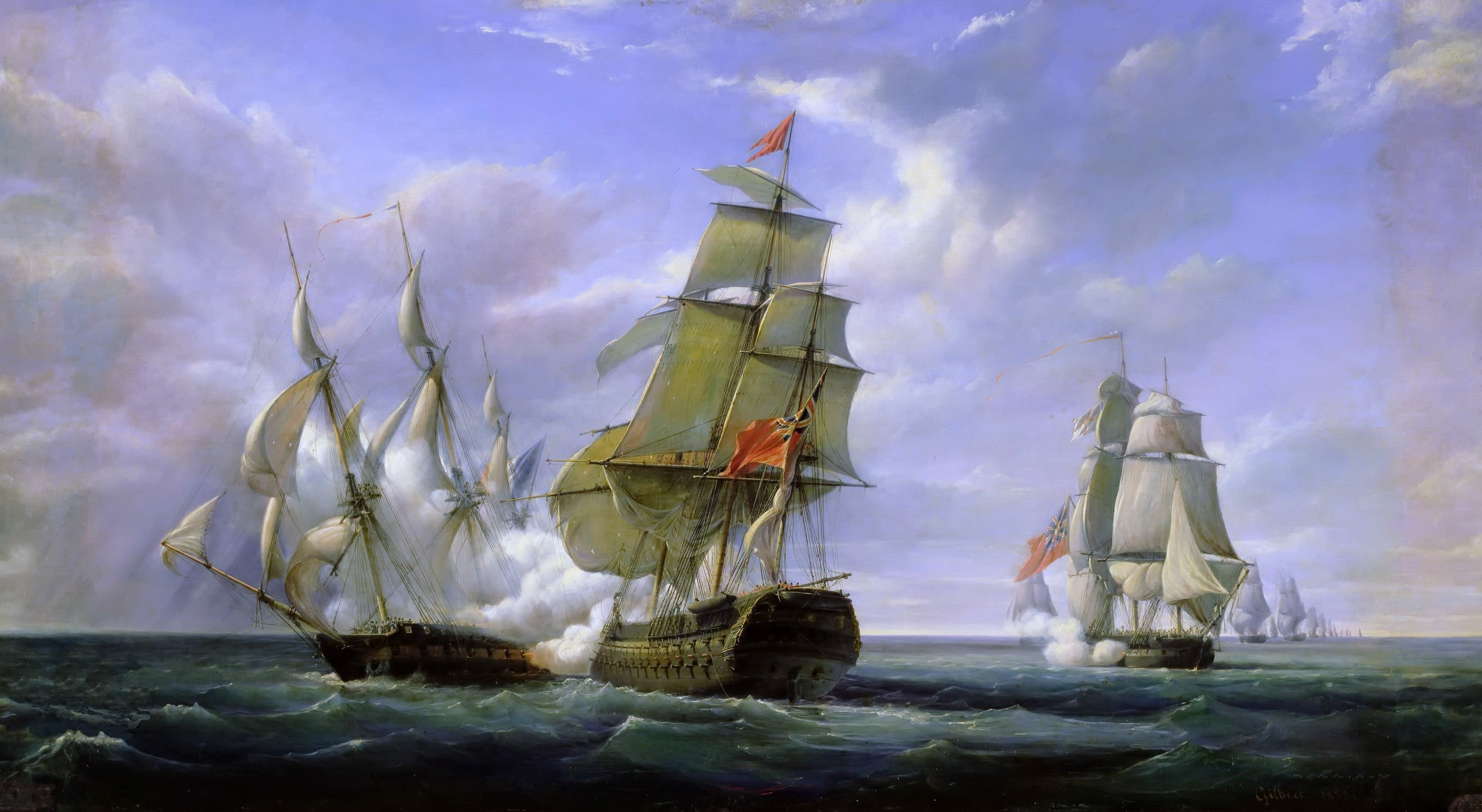
HMS Tremendous (centre) at battle

He was born in Ipswich in 1735 the son of John Barnard a Royal Navy shipwright in Ipswich and his wife Ann Notcutt.

In 1762 he entered into a partnership with William Dudman (d.1772). Together they appear to have had private commissions for smaller ships. Only following Dudman'd death in 1772 did Barnard begin building for the Royal Navy, partly taking on the role of his then elderly father. He created a new yard at Grove Street to build the hulls, which he then floated to his father's Thames Yard for fitting of masts and superstructure.

William Barnard died suddenly in Deptford in March 1795.

== Family ==
In 1760 he married Frances Clarke at Southwark church. They had eight children.

== Ships of Note ==
- Alfred for the East India Company launched at Barnard's Thames Yard in Deptford in 1772
- HMS Sultan – 74-gun ship of the line launched at Barnard's Thames Yard in 1775
- Royal Admiral – launched at Barnard's Thames Yard in 1777 for the EIC
- HMS Antelope – 30-gun Royal Navy packet launched at Barnard's Thames Yard in 1781
- HMS Africa – 64-gun ship of the line launched at Barnard's Thames Yard in 1781
- HMS Andromache – famous 32-gun frigate launched at Grove St Yard in Deptford in 1781
- HMS Scipio – 64-gun ship of the line launched at Barnard's Thames Yard in 1782
- HMS Inconstant – 36-gun frigate launched at Barnard's Thames Yard in 1783
- HMS Tremendous – 74-gun ship of the line launched at Barnard's Thames Yard in 1784
- HMS Majestic – 74-gun ship of the line launched at Barnard's Thames Yard in 1785
- HMS Zealous – 74-gun ship of the line launched at Barnard's Thames Yard in 1785
- Bridgewater – launched at Barnard's Thames Yard in 1786 for the EIC
- HMS Orion – a 74-gun ship of the line launched at Barnard's Thames Yard in 1787
- Airly Castle – launched at Deptford in 1787 for the EIC
- Boddam – launched at Barnard's Thames Yard in 1787 for the EIC
- Venus – made 15 voyages as a whaler in the British southern whale fishery.
- Hindostan – 26-gun ship for the East India Company launched at Deptford in 1789
- HMS Diamond – 38-gun frigate launched at Grove Street Yard in 1794
- HMS Spanker – 24-gun floating battery launched at Deptford in 1794, refitted as a hospital ship in 1795
- Arniston – launched at Deptford Green in 1794 for the EIC and infamously wrecked in 1815
- HMS Dryad – 36-gun frigate launched at Deptford in 1795.
- Asia – launched at Deptford in 1811 for the EIC
