= Royal Charlotte (1819 ship) =

Coordinates: 20°59′S 154°24′E

History
- Name: Royal Charlotte
- Owner: Dhunjeebhoy Nanabhoy & Co. (1823)
- Builder: Calcutta, or Cochin
- Launched: 1819
- Fate: Wrecked June 1825

General characteristics
- Tons burthen: 471, or 475, or 492 (bm)
- Propulsion: Sail

Royal Charlotte was a three-masted merchant ship launched in 1819. Royal Charlotte carried convicts to Australia in 1825. On her way home to India via Batavia she wrecked on 11 June, but with minimal loss of life.

== Origins ==
Royal Charlotte enters the British registers in 1824. The Register of Shipping describes her as being of 471 tons (bm), and built in 1819 in Calcutta. The entry in Lloyd's Register is almost entirely illegible. The entry in the 1825 issue reports a burthen of 475 tons, and an origin of Cochin in 1819.

Neither of these sources is consistent with Phipps. He reports that M. Smith launched Royal Charlotte in 1816 at Calcutta, but under the name Asia. He states that her owners sold her at Bombay in 1821, at which time they renamed her Royal Charlotte. He may be conflating Royal Charlotte with Asia

A list of vessels registered at Bombay in 1823 reports that Royal Charlotte, of 471 tons (bm), was built at Cochin in 1819.

Bateson (see below) has no place or year of origin for Royal Charlotte.

== Career ==
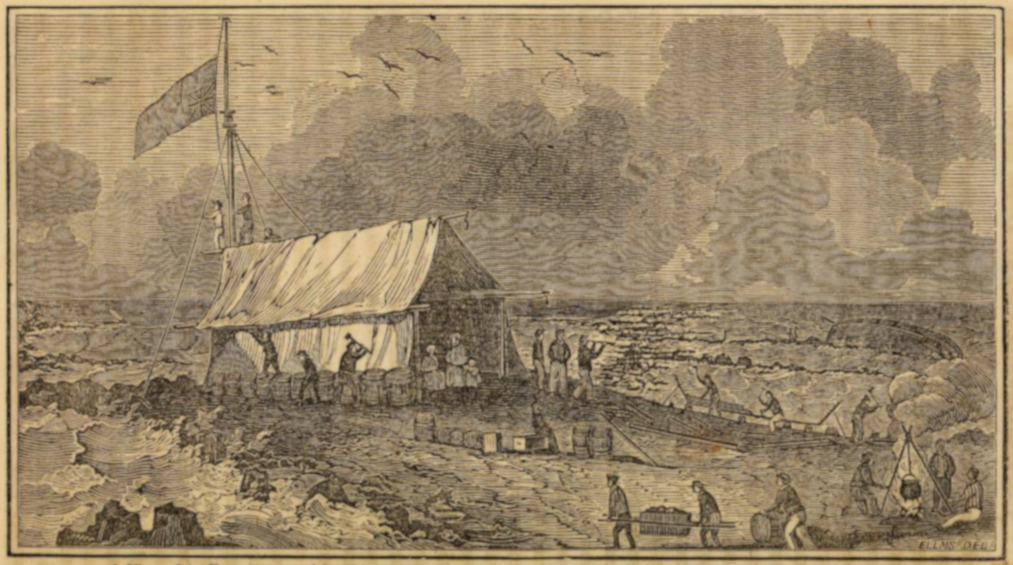
A view of the encampment of the shipwrecked company of Royal Charlotte on Frederick's Reef

In 1823 Royal Charlotte was based at Bombay with W. Howell, master. The year before, he had sailed her to China.

Under the command of Joseph Corbyn, Royal Charlotte left Portsmouth, England on 5 January 1825 and arrived at Port Jackson on 29 April. She had embarked 136 male convicts, one of whom died during the voyage.

The government then contracted with Royal Charlotte to take the detachments of the 20th, 46th, and 49th Regiments of Foot to India via Batavia.

On 11 June, Royal Charlotte ran aground on Frederick Reefs. Her crew cut away her masts to steady her, while the other crew members and the soldiers moved to shore with water and provisions before she sank. Only two people died. A party took the surviving longboat and travelled to Moreton Bay, arriving in July. The brig Amity was desptached to collect survivors.

== Post script ==
The discovery of the wreck was announced in January 2012.
