= Asia (1815 ship) =

East Indiaman, convict transport, and migrant ship (1815–1860)

History

United Kingdom
- Name: Asia
- Owner: Charles A Hackett (1815-1827); William Pope (1827-1837); Oldfield & Co (1837-1847); Ingram & Co (1847-1850); Hall & Co 1850-1860
- Builder: Matthew Smith, Calcutta, or Bombay
- Launched: 1815
- Fate: Hulked or broken up in 1860

General characteristics
- Tons burthen: 492, (Note: Bateson may have conflated Asia with Royal Charlotte, which Phipps may have conflated with Asia.) or 523, (bm)
- Length: 122 ft 3 in (37.3 m)
- Beam: 30 ft 10 in (9.4 m)
- Propulsion: Sail

Asia was a merchant ship launched at Calcutta in 1815 for Charles Hackett. She made four voyages transporting convicts from Great Britain to Australia, and between 1826 and 1830, two voyages under charter to the British East India Company (EIC). She was hulked or broken up c.1860.

== Career ==
Between 1815 and 1826, Asia was a "country ship", sailing along India's coasts. She also traded with England as a "licensed ship", i.e., a vessel that traded with England with the permission of the EIC.

Asia was sheathed in copper in 1822. Repairs were undertaken to the copper sheathing in 1824. Under the command of William Pope and surgeon Thomas Davies, she left Portsmouth, England on 6 January 1825, and arrived in Sydney on 29 April; She had embarked 200 male convicts; one convict died during the voyage. From Sydney Asia sailed to Batavia via the Torres Islands. She sailed in company with Hercules and Hugh Crawford.

On her first voyage under charter to the EIC, Captain William Adamson sailed Asia to China. She left the Downs on 1 July 1826 and arrived at Whampoa on 19 December. She left Whampoa on 13 April 1827, stopped at St Helena, and arrived at East India Dock on 5 June.

Asia was resheathed in copper in 1826 and her owner changed to William Pope in 1827.

On her second convict voyage, under the command of Henry Ager and surgeon George Fairfowl, she left Portsmouth on 17 August 1827 and arrived in Hobart on 7 December 1827. She carried 200 male convicts and had two deaths en route.

She was doubled and sheathed in copper in 1829, rated at 513 tons (bm).

For her second voyage for the EIC, Captain Henry Ager left the Downs 6 June 1829. Asia arrived at Whampoa on 9 February 1830. She then reached Halifax on 29 August, before arriving back at the River Thames on 12 November.

Between 1830 and 1860 she traded to the Far East and Australia. Further repairs were undertaken in 1831 and she was recoppered in 1833.

On her third convict voyage, she was under the command of Captain Henry Ager and her surgeon was George Birnie. She left Cork, Ireland, on 6 August 1831, arrived in Sydney on 2 December 1831. She carried 217 male convicts and had eleven convict deaths en route.

On her fourth convict voyage she under the command of Captain Benjamin Freeman, and her surgeon was John Gannon. She left Torbay, England, on 4 August 1837 and arrived in Sydney on 2 December. She carried 280 male convicts, of whom three died during the voyage.

=== Voyages to South Australia ===
- Captain Freeman sailed from London on 5 March 1839 and arrived at Holdfast Bay on 15 July. Ships surgeon was Dr George Mayo who kept a diary of this journey.
- Captain John Roskell sailed from Plymouth on 23 October 1810. Asia arrived at Port Adelaide on 17 February 1850. On this voyage rescued the crew from Pandora when she was sinking in the Bay of Biscay (48°31′N 6°19′W), and took then into Madeira. (Note: The database from the South Australian Maritime Museum identifies Pandora as being a P&O ship. However, the P&O company's database of vessels that once belonged to the company does not have a Pandora.) Asia was at Madeira between 7 and 13 November.
- Captain Roskell sailed from London on 11 May 1851 and arrived at Port Adelaide on 31 August.
- Captain Roskell also made two voyages from Melbourne to Adelaide in January and February 1852.

== Fate ==
Asia was last listed in LR in 1858. She was removed from LR in 1860 for having been either hulked or broken up.
