= Willerby (1799 ship) =

History

Great Britain
- Name: Willerby
- Namesake: Willerby
- Builder: Perry, Wells & Green, Blackwall
- Launched: 1 July 1799
- Fate: Wrecked 1818

General characteristics
- Tons burthen: 400, or 429, or 455, or 457, or 458 (bm)
- Complement: 50
- Armament: 1799:24 × 3&9&12-pounder cannons; 1799:24 × 12-pounder carronades; 1806:6 × 12-pounder & 2 × 9-pounder guns; 1811:2 × 12-pounder & 8 × 9-pounder guns + 8 × 12-pounder carronades

Willerby was launched in 1799 as a West Indiaman. French privateers captured her around early 1802, but then released her. She suffered damage in a gale in 1815, but continued to trade. She sailed to New South Wales and was wrecked in early 1818.

== Career ==
Willerby first appeared in Lloyd's Register (LR) in 1799.

Year	Master	Owner	Trade	Source
1799	P.Levett	Dale & Co.	London–Jamaica	LR

Captain Thomas? Stimpson Levild acquired a letter of marque on 7 October 1799.

In February 1802, Lloyd's List reported that two French cruizers had captured Willerby, Lovett, master, in the West Indies as Willerby was on her way to Jamaica from London and Madeira. Her captors took Willerby into Cayenne, but then released her. She subsequently arrived at st Vincent.

Between 1802 and 1806, Willerby left LR, but she continued to appear in the Register of Shipping (RS).

Year	Master	Owner	Trade	Source & notes
1805	P.Levett	Dale & Co.	London–Jamaica	RS
1806	Fountain	Dale & Co.	London–Jamaica	RS
1807	Stimpson	Dale & Co.	London–Jamaica	LR; small repairs 1805
1808	Bruce	J.Gibson	London–Jamaica	LR; small repairs 1805
1809	J.Bruce; Russels	Levett; E&T.Green	London–Jamaica	RS
1810	J.Russell	J.Green	London–Jamaica	LR; small repairs 1805
1811	J.Raffle	Green & Co.	London–Jamaica	RS
1811	Fairburn; T.Muller	Green & Co.	London–Jamaica	LR; small repairs 1805
1813	F.Muller	J.Green	London–Bermuda	LR; small repairs 1805

On 10 August 1815 a gale struck the convoy from Jamaica for London. After the gale Willerby, Muller, master, proceeded for Halifax. she had lost her mizzen mast and main top mast. She was also leaky. Willerby had had her ground tier of sugar washed out as she had seven feet of water in her hold before she was pumped out.

Year	Master	Owner	Trade	Source & notes
1816	F.Muller; R.Crosset	J.Green	Plymouth–West Indies; London–Botany Bay	LR

Willerby, Crossett, master, arrived in Sydney on 30 September 1816 with a cargo of merchandise. She left on 10 November, bound for Calcutta.

== Fate ==
Willerby, Crosset, master, was carrying a cargo of rice when she was driven ashore and wrecked on Ambon Island, Netherlands East Indies in late February or early March 1818. Her crew were rescued.
