= Nimrod (1824 ship) =

History

United Kingdom
- Name: Nimrod
- Namesake: Nimrod
- Builder: R & A Carsewell, Greenock
- Launched: 1824
- Fate: Wrecked 1854

General characteristics
- Tons burthen: 174 (bm)
- Length: 77 ft 9 in (23.7 m)
- Beam: 22 ft 8 in (6.9 m)
- Depth of hold: 14 ft 3 in (4.34 m)
- Propulsion: Sails
- Sail plan: Brig

Nimrod was launched in 1824. Ownership transferred from Port Glasgow to Leith in 1834, and then in 1839 to Sydney, New South Wales. She spent much of her subsequent career trading between Australian and New Zealand ports.

On 20 March 1840, Nimrod, of 174 tons (bm), Hay, master, arrived at Port Nicholson (Wellington), from Sydney.

In 1840, the brig Nimrod, of 174 tons, Lancaster, master, and origin Sydney, departed on 25 October with 12 passengers for the Bay of Islands.

The Sydney Morning Herald reported on 14 November 1842 that parties in the Bay of Islands had purchased Nimrod for use as a whaler. (Note: The authors of the book reporting this news are interested in the life of the author Herman Melville, and may be mistaking the Nimrod of the news with another Nimrod that was also a whaler and also operating in the South Pacific.) She went on to make 7 whaling voyages from Hobart between 1846 and 1854.

== Fate ==
Nimrod was wrecked off the coast of the Horne Islands, north west of Fiji in July 1854. "The Nimrod, had been lying at anchor off Horn's Island, and was getting under way, when her anchor got hooked amongst some rocks, and sail being upon the vessel, she canted and ran stern on".
