= Backhouse (1799 ship) =

History

Great Britain
- Name: Backhouse
- Owner: 1799: Backhouse; 1801:Mather & Co.; 1805:Kelly
- Builder: Hull
- Launched: 1799
- Fate: Burned and scuttled 3 September 1806

General characteristics
- Tons burthen: 286 (bm)
- Propulsion: Sails
- Sail plan: Fully rigged ship
- Complement: 20
- Armament: 1800:18 × 9-pounder guns; 1806: 2 × 9-pounder guns
- Notes: Two decks

Backhouse was launched at Hull in 1799 as a West Indiaman. Mather & Co. purchased her in 1800 and then employed her on two whaling voyages to the Southern Whale Fishery. They sold her in 1805 and her new owner sailed her to the West Indies. In September 1806, as she was homeward-bound, her crew burned her as she was too leaky to continue.

== Career ==
Backhouse entered Lloyd's Register (LR) in 1799.

Year	Master	Owner	Trade	Source
1799	Roberts; Wishman	Backhouse	Hull–Jamaica	LR
1800	T.Roberts; J.Redman	Backhouse	Hull–Jamaica	LR.
1801	T.Roberts	Backhouse	Liverpool–Jamaica	LR

Captain Thomas Roberts received a letter of marque for Backhouse on 18 December 1800. She then made two whaling voyages for Mather & Co. Although ownership of Backhouse apparently changed to Mather & Co. in 1801, this did not appear in Lloyd's Register until 1803.

Whaling voyage #1 (1801–1803): Backhhouse sailed in 1801 with Hugh Wyer (or Weyer), master. At some point Captain Tristram Bunker replaced Wyer. She returned to Britain on 4 January 1803. Her owner was Mather & Co.

Whaling voyage #2 (1803–1805): Backhouse, Tristram Bunker, master, left Britain on 1 February 1803, bound for the Galapagos Islands. She reached at Cape Verde on 7 March. She and Coldstream were well off the coast of "Chili" in July and August. She, Coldstream, and Wilding were next reported "all well" at the "Gallipagos" by 4 October. In May 1804 she was off the coast of Peru. On 5 August she was reported around Cape Horn. She returned to Britain on 11 July 1805.

Lloyd's Register for 1805 showed Backhouse changing hands again, and undergoing repairs. Her owner became Captain & Co., her master was Kelly, and her trade was now London-West Indies instead of London-Chilli. The Register of Shipping showed her master changing to Kelly, her owner to Cox & Co., and her trade changing from London–Southern Fishery to London–Demerara.

== Loss ==
In September 1806 news arrived in Britain that Backhouse, Kelly, master, and another vessel of the homeward-bound merchant fleet, had foundered as Backhouse was sailing to London from Demerara. A report a few days later corrected this news. On 3 September 1806 her crew had burnt Backhouse as she was too leaky to continue sailing; the crew were all rescued.
