= Hercules (1822 ship) =

History

United Kingdom
- Name: Hercules
- Namesake: Hercules
- Owner: 1822:Edward Chapman; 1826:Buckle & Co.; 1836:Carter & Co.
- Builder: Fishburn & Brodrick, Whitby
- Launched: 20 June 1822
- Fate: Broken up 1847

General characteristics
- Tons burthen: 482, or 483 (bm)
- Length: 119 ft 8 in (36.5 m)
- Beam: 30 ft 5 in (9.3 m)
- Propulsion: Sail

Hercules was built in 1822 at Whitby, England. She made three voyages to Australia transporting convicts to New South Wales. She also made two voyages under contract to the British East India Company (EIC). She was broken up in 1847.

== Career ==
First convict voyage (1825): Captain Peter Reeves sailed from Cork, Ireland on 5 January 1825, and arrived in Sydney on 22 April. Hercules had embarked 134 male convicts. She had one death en route.

She sailed back to England via the Torres Islands and Batavia in company with Hugh Crawford.

EIC voyage #1 (1826): Captain William Vaughan sailed Hercules from her dock in London on 23 June 1826, bound for Bengal. Hercules reached Madras on 16 October, and arrived at Calcutta on 15 November.

EIC voyage #2 (1828–1829): Captain Vaughn sailed from The Downs on 22 May 1828, bound for Madras and Bengal. Hercules reached Madras on 21 September, and arrived at Calcutta on 12 October. Homeward bound, she was at Diamond Harbour on 3 January 1829, returned to Madras on 6 February, reached Saint Helena on 30 April, and arrived at The Downs on 21 June.

Second convict voyage (1830): Captain Vaughn sailed from Dublin on 3 July 1830, and arrived in Sydney on 1 November 1830. She had embarked 200 male convicts and landed 199, having suffered one convict death en route.

Third convict voyage (1832): Captain Vaughn sailed from The Downs on 19 June 1832, and arrived in Sydney on 16 October 1832. She had embarked 200 male convicts; she had two convict deaths en route.

In 1836 Hercules was sold to Carter & Co. She had damages repaired and her trade became London–New York.

== Fate ==
Hercules was condemned in 1847, after her owners had refused survey. She was sold for breaking up.
