= Soham (given name) =

Soham is a given name which may refer to:

- Soham Chakrabarty, 21st century Indian playback singer
- Soham Chakraborty (born 1984), Indian actor, producer, television personality and politician
- Soham Ghosh (born 1986), Indian former cricketer
- Soham Shah, 21st century Bollywood movie director
- Soham Swami (1858–1918), Hindu guru and yogi and lion tamer
- Soham El Wardini (born 1953), Senegalese politician and mayor of Dakar, Senegal

== See also ==
- Soham (disambiguation)
