= SS Asia (1873) =

Canadian passenger steamship

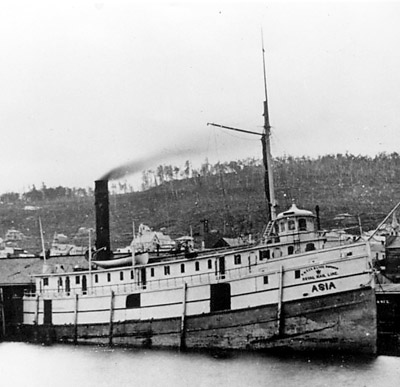
- Passenger steamboat Asia

History

Canada
- Name: Asia
- Namesake: Asia
- Owner: Great Northern Transit Co.
- Builder: Simpson M., Saint Catharines, Ontario
- Launched: 1873
- Fate: Sank, 14 September 1882

General characteristics
- Type: Passenger-cargo ship
- Tonnage: 364 GRT
- Length: 41.5 m (136 ft 2 in)
- Beam: 7.11 m (23 ft 4 in)
- Propulsion: 1 boiler, compound steam engine, single screw
- Capacity: Passengers: 100; Crew: 25

SS Asia was a Canadian passenger steamship and package freighter of the Northwestern Transportation Company. She was 41.5 m (136 ft 2 in) long and had a beam of 7.11 m (23.3 ft). Launched at St. Catharines, Ontario in 1873, she was built as a canaller, a vessel designed for use in the Welland Canal and other enclosed watercourses of the day. She was converted by her owners for services in the open Great Lakes. Heavily laden and top-heavy with freight, she sank near Lonely Island in Georgian Bay on 14 September 1882 with a loss of 123 lives. The vessel had been fitted with flimsy lifeboats, which repeatedly overturned in the heavy waters. A lifeboat that had originally saved 18 officers and passengers from the foundering Asia then capsized over and over in storm conditions, leading to the deaths of most of the castaways. By the time the one remaining lifeboat made land near Parry Sound, only two passengers remained alive.

== In history ==
There were only two survivors of the wreck. The loss of life made this disaster, in terms of loss of life from the sinking of a single vessel, the eighth-worst tragedy in the history of the Great Lakes.
