= Caerwent (1799 ship) =

History

Great Britain
- Name: Caerwent
- Namesake: Caerwent
- Builder: Rotherhithe
- Launched: 1799
- Fate: Lost 1810

General characteristics
- Tons burthen: 269, or 270, or 273, or 276 (bm)
- Complement: 36
- Armament: 16 × 6-pounder guns + 4 swivel guns

Caerwent was built at Rotherhithe and launched in 1799. She was a West Indiaman that the French captured in 1803 and the British Royal Navy recaptured shortly thereafter. She made one voyage as a whaler, but then returned to the West Indies trade. She was lost at Jackmel, Hayti, in May 1810.

== Career ==
Caerwent entered Lloyd's Register in 1799 with Robinson, master, J. Thompson, owner, and trade London–Jamaica.

On 4 July 1803, shortly after the resumption of war with France, HMS Acasta recaptured Caerwent. Caerwent, Robinson, master, was sent into Portsmouth.

Whaling voyage (1804–1807): Captain Job Anthony acquired a letter of marque on 30 January 1804. At the start of the voyage Caerwent's owner, or part owner, was Lord Camelford, a particularly violent former naval officer. When Camelford died three days after being wounded in a duel on 7 March 1804, his whalers, Caerwent, Wilding (or Willding), and Cambridge passed to Lord Grenville, a relative by marriage, who sold them when they returned from their voyages.

Anthony sailed from London in February, bound for the Galápagos Islands. On 29 May Caerwent and Cambridge were at Rio de Janeiro. They were later reported to have arrived at Hood Island.

On 5 December 1806 Lloyd's List reported that Caerwent, Anthony, master, and Cambridge, Thompson, late master, were at the Cape of Good Hope, Both returned to London on 12 May 1805.

The Register of Shipping for 1809 showed Caerwent with J.Stafford, master, Annen, owner, and trade London–Curacoa.

== Fate ==
Caerwent, Browmer, master, was lost on 31 May 1810 as she was coming out of the harbour at Jacmel in 1810. She was on her way to London.

The Register of Shipping for 1810 showed Caerwent with Massingham, master, Annen, owner, and trade London–Curacoa. However, it has the annotation "LOST".
