= Asia (1798 ship) =

Merchant ship 1798 to 1826

History
- Name: Asia
- Owner: Sanson & Co.
- Builder: Philadelphia
- Launched: 1798
- Fate: Taken; condemned 1805

United Kingdom
- Name: Duchess of York
- Owner: J. Annen & Co.
- Acquired: 1805 by purchase
- Fate: Wrecked 1 February 1826

General characteristics
- Type: Full-rigged ship
- Tons burthen: 342, or 350, or 35080/94 or 351, or 357 (bm)
- Propulsion: Sail
- Armament: 1800:4 × 4-pounder + 2 × 9-pounder + 1 × 6-pounder guns; 1810:2 × 9-pounder guns + 10 × 9-pounder carronades; 1810:6 × 6-pounder guns + 8 × 12-pounder guns "of the new construction"; 1815:12 × 4-pounder guns + 2 × 9-pounder carronades; 1815:8 × 9-pounder + 6 × 6-pounder guns; 1815:10 × 6-pounder guns + 4 × 4-pounders "of the new construction"

Asia was launched at Philadelphia. Early records have her launch year as 1795, but later records have it as 1798. She entered British records in 1800 as trading with the Far East. As the British East India Company had a monopoly of British trade with the Far East, Asia almost certainly did not sail under the British flag, though she did operate from Britain. In 1805 the privateer Mercury seized her and the High Court of Admiralty condemned Asia for trading with France. New owners named her Duchess of York (or Dutchess of York, depending on the source). She then became a West Indiaman. She was wrecked at Guadeloupe in 1826.

== Asia ==
Asia first appeared in British shipping registers in 1800.

Year	Master	Owner	Trade	Source
1800	T. Morgan	Sanson & Co.	London-India	Register of Shipping
1800	Morgan	Sanson & Co.	London-Canton	Lloyd's Register
1805	W. Morgan	Sanson & Co.	London-Canton	Lloyd's Register

On 22 May 1805 the Prize Court condemned Asia. The privateer Mercury had detained her for trading with the French.

== Duchess of York ==
J. Annen & Co. purchased Asia and renamed her Duchess of York.

On 18 November 1810, Duchess of York was outbound from London to Rio de Janeiro when she ran aground on the Goodwin Sands. Some boats from Ramsgate got her off.

On 19 December 1812 a violent gale damaged Dutchess of York, Massingham, master, and several other vessels in the Tagus.

Year	Master	Owner	Trade	Source
1806	Massingham	J. Annen & Co.	London-Surinam	Register of Shipping
1806	Poulteny	J. Annen & Co.	London-West Indies	Lloyd's Register
1809	Masingham; D. Dorothy	J. Annen & Co.	London—Montevideo; London—Curacoa	Register of Shipping
1810	Dorothy; Masingham	J. Annen & Co.	Liverpool-Curacoa; London-Haiti	Register of Shipping
1810	Butler; Masingham	J.Annen & Co.	London-West Indies	Lloyd's Register
1815	Massingham	J.Annen & Co.	London-Buenos Aires	Register of Shipping
1815	Massingham	J. Annen & Co.	London-Buenos Aires	Lloyd's Register
1820	Massingham	J. Annen & Co.	London-Buenos Aires	Lloyd's Register Register of Shipping
1826	G. Oxley	Somes & Co.	Cork transport	Lloyd's Register
1826	Oxley	Curling & Co.	London transport	Register of Shipping

== Loss ==
The transport Dutchess of York, Ford, master, was wrecked on 1 February 1826 on the north coast of Guadeloupe. All on board were rescued. Lloyd's Register and Register of Shipping no longer list her in 1827.
