= Norfolk Hero (1799 ship) =

British merchant ship 1799–1827

History

Great Britain
- Name: Norfolk Hero
- Namesake: Lord Nelson, born in Norfolk, and hero of the Battle of the Nile
- Launched: 1799, Yarmouth
- Fate: Wrecked November 1827

General characteristics
- Tons burthen: 263 (bm)
- Armament: 4 × 6-pounder guns

Norfolk Hero was launched at Yarmouth in 1799. She traded with North American and the West Indies. In 1808 she was captured, but quickly recaptured. She continued to trade widely until she was lost in November 1827.

== Career ==
Norfolk Hero first appeared in Lloyd's Register (LR) in the volume for 1799.

Year	Master	Owner	Trade	Source & notes
1799	C.Scott	Preston	Yarmouth–Baltic	LR
1805	C.Scott; J.Calver	Preston	London–Quebec	LR
1807	J.Calver; M'Aikill	Preston & Co.	London–Quebec; London–Demerara	LR

Lloyd's List reported in April 1808 that Norfolk Hero and Heroine had been captured, retaken, and brought into Barbados. Norfolk Hero had been sailing to St Kitts, and Heroine had been sailing to Tortola. Unfortunately, press reports did not name the captor(s) or recaptor(s).

Year	Master	Owner	Trade	Source & notes
1810	J.Walker; H.Dow	Preston; Nelson	London–Dublin	LR; damages repaired 1810
1811	J.Walker; W.Dow	Nelson & Co.	Dartmouth–Cork; London–Tobago	LR; damages repaired 1810
1816	W.Dow	Nelson & Co.	London–Tobago	LR; repairs 1812 and damages repaired 1813

On 21 May 1817, Norfolk Hero, Dow, master, put into Grenada. She had been on her way from Tobago to London when she had developed a leak. It was expected that she would have to unload 150 cases to be repaired. She discharged some hogsheads of sugar and 100 puncheons of rum. After she was repaired she proceeded on her voyage on 7 June. On 11 June she was at St Thomas.

Year	Master	Owner	Trade	Source & notes
1819	W.Dow; J.Kirton	Nelson & Co.	Cowes–Tobago	LR; good repair 1813 & small repairs 1817
1820	J.Kerton; Cuthbertson	Stanhope	Plymouth–New Brunswick	LR; good repair 1813 & small repairs 1817 & 1820
1821	Cuthbertson	Stanhope	Dartmouth–Trieste	LR; good repair 1813 & small repairs 1817 & 1820
1822	Cuthbertson; Sapwich/Sopwith	Stanhope	Dartmouth–Trieste	LR; small repairs 1820
1824	Sopwith; W.Hunter	Stanhope	London–New Brunswick	LR; small repairs 1820
1826	D.Walker	Stanhope	London–Quebec	LR; small repairs 1820
1827	D.Walker; Woodward	Stanhope & Co.	London–Quebec	LR; small repairs 1820

== Fate ==
Norfolk Hero, Woodward, master, was lost in November 1827 off Aldeburgh, Suffolk. She was on a voyage from Riga to London.
