= Martha (1799 ship) =

Australian ship

History

Great Britain
- Name: Martha
- Owner: Reed, Boston, & Co.
- Builder: Port Jackson
- Launched: 1799
- Fate: Wrecked August 1800

General characteristics
- Tons burthen: 30½ (bm)
- Sail plan: Schooner

Martha was constructed in Sydney in 1799. She was a sealer and merchant vessel that was wrecked at Little Manly Cove in Australia in August 1800 with the loss of her crew of four. Her master was William Reid (or Reed). She arrived at Port Jackson on 14 December from Bass Strait. She was carrying 1,000 to 1,300 seal skins and 30 tierces of seal oil. She then left again on 6 March 1800.

On the voyage that proved her undoing, Martha was wrecked with a load of coal on her way from Reid's Mistake (the head of Lake Macquarie) to Sydney.
