= Surinam (1805 ship) =

Ship

History

United Kingdom
- Name: Surinam
- Namesake: Suriname
- Launched: 1799
- Acquired: 1805 by purchase of a prize
- Fate: Wrecked 1808

General characteristics
- Tons burthen: 267, or 297 (bm)
- Armament: 1806: 4 × 6-pounder guns

Surinam was built in Bilbao in 1799, and taken in prize in 1805. She first appeared in Lloyd's Register (LR) in 1806.

| Year | Master | Owner | Trade | Source |
|---|---|---|---|---|
| 1806 | J.James | Bruce & Co. | Plymouth–Dantzig | Register of Shipping |
| 1806 | Wm.Blythe | Bruce & Co. | Bristol–Surinam | LR |

Bruce & Co. was probably Bruce and Moens, the principal local Surinam merchants of the period. Surinam made two complete voyages between Bristol and Surinam between 1806 and 1807. She was lost on her third, in 1808.

Lloyd's List reported in June 1808, that Surinam, Blythe, master, from Surinam to London, was ashore at Grenada with five feet of water in her hold. The greater part of her cargo was expected to be saved.

The volume of LR for 1810 carried the annotation "lost", below her name.
