= Pitt (1799 ship) =

History

Great Britain
- Builder: Ulverston
- Launched: 1799
- Fate: Last listed 1833

General characteristics
- Tons burthen: 307, or 308, or 320 (bm)
- Complement: 1803:38; 1810:20; 1811:20
- Armament: 1800:4 × 9-pounder guns; 1803:14 × 6&12-pounder guns; 1810:12 × 6&12-pounder guns; 1811:12 × 12&6-pounder guns

Pitt was launched at Ulverston in 1799 and proceeded to sail to the West Indies and New York. A French privateer captured her in 1806 but she quickly returned to British ownership and sailing as a West Indiaman. She continued trading with the West Indies and North America until she was last listed in 1833.

== Career ==
Pitt first appeared in Lloyd's Register (LR), in 1800.

| Year | Master | Owner | Trade | Source |
|---|---|---|---|---|
| 1800 | J.Towers | Alkinson | Lancaster-Antigua | LR |
| 1803 | J.Towers; D.Campbell | Atkinson; J.&D.M'Gown | Lancaster-Antigua; Greenock–New York | LR |

On 8 August 1803 Captain Daniel Campbell acquired a letter of marque.

| Year | Master | Owner | Trade | Source |
|---|---|---|---|---|
| 1807 | Campbell | M'Gowan | Greenock–Jamaica | LR |

On 25 December 1806 the French privateer schooner Jeune Adelle captured Pitt, Campbell, master, at 17°N 56°W as Pitt was sailing from Glasgow to Jamaica. Pitt had five men killed and several wounded before she struck her colours. Jeune Adele sent Pitt into Guadeloupe. (Note: Jeune Adele was a privateer schooner commissioned in Guadeloupe circa June 1806, with cruises in June, and October-November under a Captain Le Prieur, with 61 men and fourteen 6-pounder guns. Later captains included Joseph Rival, of Marseilles, and Bazin.) The LR volume for 1808 carried the annotation "captured" by Pitt's name. However, the same volume lists Pitt, of 308 tons (bm), launched in Ulvereston, with launch year of 1800. This Pitt did not appear in earlier volumes of LR or the Register of Shipping, suggesting the two vessels are the same, and that in a manner still obscure Pitt returned to British hands, though with a different master and owners.

| Year | Master | Owner | Trade | Source & notes |
|---|---|---|---|---|
| 1808 | Hawthornthwaite | Blount & Co. | Lancaster–"Dmng" | LR |
| 1811 | Hawthornthwaite | Blount & Co. | Lancaster–Martinique | LR; damages repaired 1811 |

On 27 February 1810 Captain Robert Hathornthwaite acquired a letter of marque.

On 13 August Pitt, Hawthornthwaite, master, was at Liverpool, having returned from Dominica, when a gale drove her and several other ships on shore. All were later refloated, having sustained only slight damage.

| Year | Master | Owner | Trade | Source & notes |
|---|---|---|---|---|
| 1812 | Hawthornthwaite; Dennings | Blunt & Co. | Liverpool–Dominica | LR; damages repaired 1811 |

Captain William Denning acquired a letter of marque of 19 December 1811.

| Year | Master | Owner | Trade | Source & notes |
|---|---|---|---|---|
| 1814 | Denning; M'Farlane; Crawford | Blunt & Co. | London–Dominica | LR; damages repaired 1811 |
| 1815 | P.Crawford; Forster | M'Gown | Greenock–Saint Thomas | LR; damages repaired 1811 |
| 1820 | J.Hamilton | Donaldson&Co. | Greenock–New Brunswick | LR; small repairs 1814 & repairs 1815 |
| 1830 | J.Hamilton | Donaldson&Co. | Greenock–"BChlr" | LR; repairs 1815 |

== Fate ==
Pitt was last listed in LR in 1834 with data unchanged from 1833 with data unchanged from 1830. She may have transferred to Air, but confirming details are lacking.
