= Asia (1799 ship) =

History

Great Britain
- Builder: Edward Mosley, North Shields, Newcastle-upon-Tyne
- Launched: 1799
- Fate: Lost at sea

General characteristics
- Tons burthen: 450, or 45740/94, (bm)
- Length: 107 ft 2 in (32.7 m)
- Beam: 31 ft 11 in (9.7 m)
- Armament: 1799:3 × 6-pounder guns; 1810:8 × 18-pounder guns "of the New Construction"

Asia was launched in 1799 at North Shields. She sailed first as a transport and then as a general trader. She made four voyages (1814–1818) to India under a license from the British East India Company (EIC). She was lost at sea in 1835.

== Career ==
Asia first appeared in Lloyd's Register (LR) in 1799 with Lilbourn, master, Flemming, owner, and trade London transport.

Year	Master	Owner	Trade	Source & notes
1800	Lilbourn	Fleming	London transport	LR
1805	Lilbourn	Fleming	London transport	LR
1810	R.M.Arle	Greig & Co.	London transport	LR
1815	R.M.Arle; A.Grieg	A.Greig	London transport	LR; large repair 1812

In 1813 the EIC lost its monopoly on the trade between India and Britain. British ships were then free to sail to India or the Indian Ocean under a license from the EIC.

On 8 June 1814 Captain W. Hall sailed Asia to Bombay under a licensed from the EIC. She was at Portsmouth on 28 June.

Then on 23 April 1815 Captain Grieg sailed her on a second voyage to Bombay. She returned on 15 January 1816. She had left Bombay on 16 September and had touched at Saint Helena on 23 November. Her round trip had taken eight months and 18 days, something that apparently Lloyd's List (LL) thought worth remarking on.

On 18 April 1816 Asia, Grieg, master, sailed for Madeira and Bombay. Between 9–15 May she was at Madeira. She arrived back at Gravesend on 16 January 1817.

On 12 April 1817 Asia, Grieg, master, sailed for Madeira and Bombay. On 4 March 1818 Asia was at Ramsgate, having returned from Bombay, when a gale caught her and other vessels there. She was driven on the Dyke with the loss of her rudder. She had previously lost an anchor and cables in the Downs. She was expected to be gotten off.

Year	Master	Owner	Trade	Source & notes
1818	A.Greig; Ward	A.Grieg	London–India; London–Quebec	LR; thorough repair 1813, small repairs 1817, & damages repaired 1818
1820	Ward	Capt. & Co.	London–Quebec	LR; thorough repair 1813, small repairs 1817, & damages repaired 1818
1825	W.Ward	E.Rule	Bristol-Sierra Leone	LR; small repairs 1817 & 1824
1830	W.Ward	E.Rule	London–Quebec	LR; small repairs 1824 & 1828
1831	W.Ward	E.Rule	London–Ascension Island	LR; small repairs 1824 & 1828

== Fate ==
On 23 November 1835 Asia's register was cancelled as she had been lost at sea.
