= Nimrod (1810 ship) =

History

United States
- Builder: Delaware, or Philadelphia
- Launched: 1799
- Fate: Sold c.1810

United Kingdom
- Name: Nimrod
- Acquired: 1810
- Fate: Last listed in 1820

General characteristics
- Tons burthen: 281 (bm)
- Armament: 14 × 12-pounder guns

Nimrod was launched in 1799 in Delaware or Philadelphia, possibly under another name. She first appeared in Lloyd's Register (LR) in 1810 as a West Indiaman. In 1815 she was listed as being employed in the South Seas Fishery. She was last listed in 1820.

== Career ==
Nimrod first appeared in LR in 1810.

Year	Master	Owner	Trade	Source
1810	W.Burke	Robertson	Greenock–St Barts	LR
1815	W.Burke	Robertson	London–South Seas	LR; good repair 1811
1820	W.Burke	Robertson	London–South Seas	LR; good repair 1811

Lloyd's List's Ship arrival and departure (SAD) information carries no mention of her.

== Fate ==
Nimrod was last listed in the Register of Shipping in 1816 and in LR in 1820.
