= Asia (1813 ship) =

Merchant ship built in 1813

History

United Kingdom
- Name: Asia
- Owner: 1813:Edward Chapman, or Aaron Chapman; 1820:Aaron Campbell (Managing owner)
- Builder: Fishburn & Brodrick, Whitby
- Launched: 24 April 1813
- Fate: Last listed 1850

General characteristics
- Type: Brig
- Tons burthen: 455, or 458 (bm)
- Length: 118 ft 8 in (36.2 m)
- Beam: 29 ft 9 in (9.1 m)
- Propulsion: Sail
- Armament: 10 × 18-pounder guns "of the New Construction"

Asia was a merchant barque built at Whitby in 1813. She made one voyage to India for the British East India Company (EIC) in 1820–21, and one voyage to Van Diemen's Land in 1827–28 transporting convicts. Asia then traded to the Mediterranean, but mostly to Quebec. She was last listed in 1850.

Mention is made of the ship in “Reminiscences of a Canadian Pioneer” by Samuel Thompson:

“...at length engaged passage in the bark Asia, 500 tons, rated A. No. 1, formerly an East Indiaman, and now bound for Quebec, to seek a cargo of white pine lumber for the London market.”

== Origins ==
Asia was launched at Whitby in 1813. She then became a transport.

Asia first appeared in Lloyd's Register (LR) in 1813 with Walker, master, Chapman, owner, and trade London transport.

Year	Master	Owner	Trade	Source & notes
1815	Walker; Goodwin	Chapman	London transport London–Jamaica	LR
1820	Goodwin; Patterson	Chapman	London–Jamaica; London–Lisbon	LR

Lloyd's Register for the years 1820 to 1823 does not show a voyage to India. However, the Register was only as accurate as the information owners chose to feed it. The Register of Shipping for 1821 does show a voyage to India. It has Asia, Patterson, master, Chapman, owner, sailing from London to Bombay, and then London to Quebec.

Lloyd's Register	Master	Owner	Trade
1820	Godwin; Patterson	Chapman	London-Jamaica; London-Lisbon
1821	Patterson	Chapman	London-Lisbon
1822	Patterson	Chapman	London-Lisbon; London-Quebec
1823	Patterson	Chapman	London-Quebec

EIC voyage (1820–1821): Captain John Patterson sailed from the Downs on 4 June 1820, bound for Bombay. Asia arrived at Bombay on 26 September. Homeward bound, she was at the Cape of Good Hope on 27 February 1821, reached Saint Helena on 19 March, and arrived back at East India Dock on 31 May.

Lloyd's Register	Master	Owner	Trade
1824	Tindall	Chapman	London-Quebec
1825	Tindall	Chapman	London-Quebec
1826	Tindall	Chapman	London-Quebec
1827	Tindall	Chapman	London
1828	Tindall	Chapman	London

In 1825 Asia shifted her registry to London.

Convict transport: A table of convict voyages to New South Wales and Van Diemen's Land in 1828 Lloyd's Register, lists Asia, J. Edman, master, A. Chapman, owner, but does not specify the destination. A belated notation in Lloyd's Register for 1829 too advises that J. Edman was master of Asia in 1827.

Under the command of John Edman, Asia sailed from London, England on 1 August 1827, and arrived at Hobart Town on 30 November. She had embarked 158 male convicts, one of whom died on the voyage. Asia left Hobart Town on 19 December bound for Sydney arriving on 24 December. Asia left Sydney on 25 January bound for Isle de France.

== Later career ==
Lloyd's Register	Master	Owner	Trade
1829	Tindall	Chapman	London
1830	J. Edmonds	Chapman	Cowes-Antwerp
1831	J. Edmonds; R. White	Chapman	London
1832	R. White	Chapman	London-Quebec
1833	R. White	Chapman	London
1834	R. White		London
1835	R. White		London
1836	R. White	Chapman	London-Gibraltar
1837	Wilson	Chapman	London-Gibraltar
1838	G. Aeir	Chapman	London
1839	Richardson	Chapman	London-Bermuda; London-Malta
1840	Richardson	Chapman	London-Malta
1841	Richardson; Woodward	Chapman	London-Malta; London-Quebec
1842	Richardson; Woodward	Chapman	London-Malta; London-Quebec
1843	Woodward	Chapman	London-Quebec
1844	Woodward	Chapman	London-Quebec
1845	Woodward	Chapman	London-Quebec
1846	Woodward	Chapman	London-Quebec
1847	Woodward	Chapman	London-Quebec
1848	Woodward	Chapman	London-Quebec
1849	Woodward	Chapman	London-Quebec
1850	Woodward	Chapman	London-Quebec
