= HMS Asia =

Five ships of the Royal Navy have borne the name HMS Asia, after the continent of Asia:

- HMS Asia (1694) was a hulk purchased in 1694 and foundered in 1701.
- HMS Asia (1764) was a 64-gun third rate launched in 1764 and broken up in 1804.
- HMS Asia (1811) was a 74-gun third rate launched in 1811. She was renamed HMS Alfred in 1819, reduced to 50-guns in 1828 and broken up in 1865.
- HMS Asia (1824) was an 84-gun second rate launched in 1824. She was Codrington's flagship at the Battle of Navarino, made guardship from 1858 and sold in 1908.
- HMS Asia (1919) was an auxiliary cruiser of the British Caspian Flotilla from 1918 to 1919.
