= Nimrod (1821 ship) =

History

United Kingdom
- Name: Nimrod
- Namesake: Nimrod
- Owner: 1821: John Scott & Co.; 1828:Harvie & Co.; 1832:Henry Moore; 1841: Henry & Joseph Moore; 1843: Lamb & Parbury.; 1845: Thomas Larkins (London), possibly on behalf of Jardine, Matheson & Co.
- Port of registry: №272 on the General Registry, Calcutta
- Builder: John Scott & Co., Fort Gloucester (Fort Gloster), Calcutta
- Launched: 11 December 1821
- Notes: Teak-built

General characteristics
- Tons burthen: 216, or 23175/94 (bm)
- Length: 92 ft 0 in (28.0 m)
- Beam: 23 ft 8 in (7.2 m)
- Propulsion: Sails
- Sail plan: Barque

Nimrod was launched late in 1821 at Calcutta. One report has her being sold in 1825; she did change her homeport to the United Kingdom. In 1832 her ownership and homeport changed to Sydney, Australia.

== Career ==
Nimrod first appeared in Lloyd's Register (LR) in 1824 with master Wm. Spiers, owner Scott & Co., and trade London-Calcutta.

That entry continues unchanged until 1827, when her master changed perhaps twice, first to Murphy and then to Harvey. She also had damages repaired in 1827. The reason for the repairs was that Nimrod had grounded at Liverpool in December 1826.

Nimrod, Harvey, master, arrived at Saint Helena on 4 October 1826, and left two days later, continuing her journey from Penang to London. Nimrod was driven ashore on 3 December 1826 at Hoylake, Lancashire. The Hoylake Lifeboat rescued her crew. The next day she was still on shore, but was only leaking a little. Lighters had been sent to remove her cargo. Nimrod was refloated on 14 December and taken in to Liverpool.

In 1828 her master was Murphy, her owner Harvie & Co., and her trade "LoSncap". (Note: "Sncap" may mean Sydney via the Cape of Good Hope (the Cape). Nimrod is on record as having left England on 27 October 1827 and having arrived at Sydney on 28 December, having transited via the Cape.) This entry continues unchanged through 1832. In 1833 Nimrod was no longer listed in Lloyd's Register.

In February 1832 Nimrod's registration and ownership changed to Sydney, Australia. Her new owners were Robert Campbell jr. & Thomas Collins. They employed her as a whaler. She went on to make 8 whaling voyages from Sydney between 1832 and 1845.

Year	Master	Notes
1832-1833	Joseph White	At Pohnpei in November 1832
1833	McAuliffe	Killed at Pingelap
1833-1834	George Hempleman	
1834-1837?	John C. Brown	
1837-1839 William Butler	Two voyages	
1841-1843	Charles Hereford (Harford)	
1843-1845	William Sullivan	Two voyages

Nimrod, Captain McAuliffe, put in at Kosrae in early November 1833. There she gave passage to a white man who had been living ashore. One of the crew was nearly poisoned by natives. Then on 25 November Nimrod was anchored at Pingelap when local natives attacked her. They killed McAuliffe and two of his crew, and wounded three others before she could escape, leaving five dead natives behind. She brought off nine whites and delivered them to Pohnpei, where she stayed for a few days.

Between 1840 and 1846, ownership changed several times. In February 1840 her owner became Henry Moore, and in November 1841, Henry was joined by Joseph Moore. Henry Moore & Co. failed in 1843 and Nimrod apparently initially failed to attract buyers.

Still, in August 1843, Lamb and Parbury assumed ownership of Nimrod. The Australian reported that "the whaling barque Nimrod, 232 tons, Sullivan, master," had arrived at Sydney from the South Sea Fishery with sperm and black oil. The newspaper later reported that Nimrod, Sullivan, master, and Lamb and Parbury, owners, had sailed on 25 July 1844 on a whaling voyage.

In 1844, "The Nimrod, whaler, lost a boat's crew consisting of Othaheitians and New Zealanders, and the officer was also a man of colour."

Then, according to one source, in September 1845 Thomas Larkins, of London, acquired Nimrod. However, a different source refers to Nimrod as belonging to Jardine, Matheson & Co, of Hong Kong, and Larkins as an employee of theirs. The two are not necessarily contradictory, and Nimrod does not return to Lloyd's Register. (Note: In May 1841, Jardine, Matheson & Co. sent a Nimrod to Sydney with a cargo of tea. However, this may have been Nimrod, which, for instance, was reported having entered Hong Kong harbour on 11 September 1841 from Macao but bound to Macao. On 22 September she was recorded as having entered Hong Kong harbour from Macao, but with destination London, with a cargo of tea.) In December 1848 Nimrod brought 120 Chinese coolies as indentured laborers from Amoy to Moreton Bay, Australia.

There is a report that Nimrod, Alexander McLeod, master, left Hobart on 26 December 1849 on a whaling voyage to Holdfast Bay. She returned on 22 September 1850. However, there is reason to believe that this vessel was actually a different Nimrod.
