= Asia (1811 EIC ship) =

UK East India merchant ship (1811–1840)

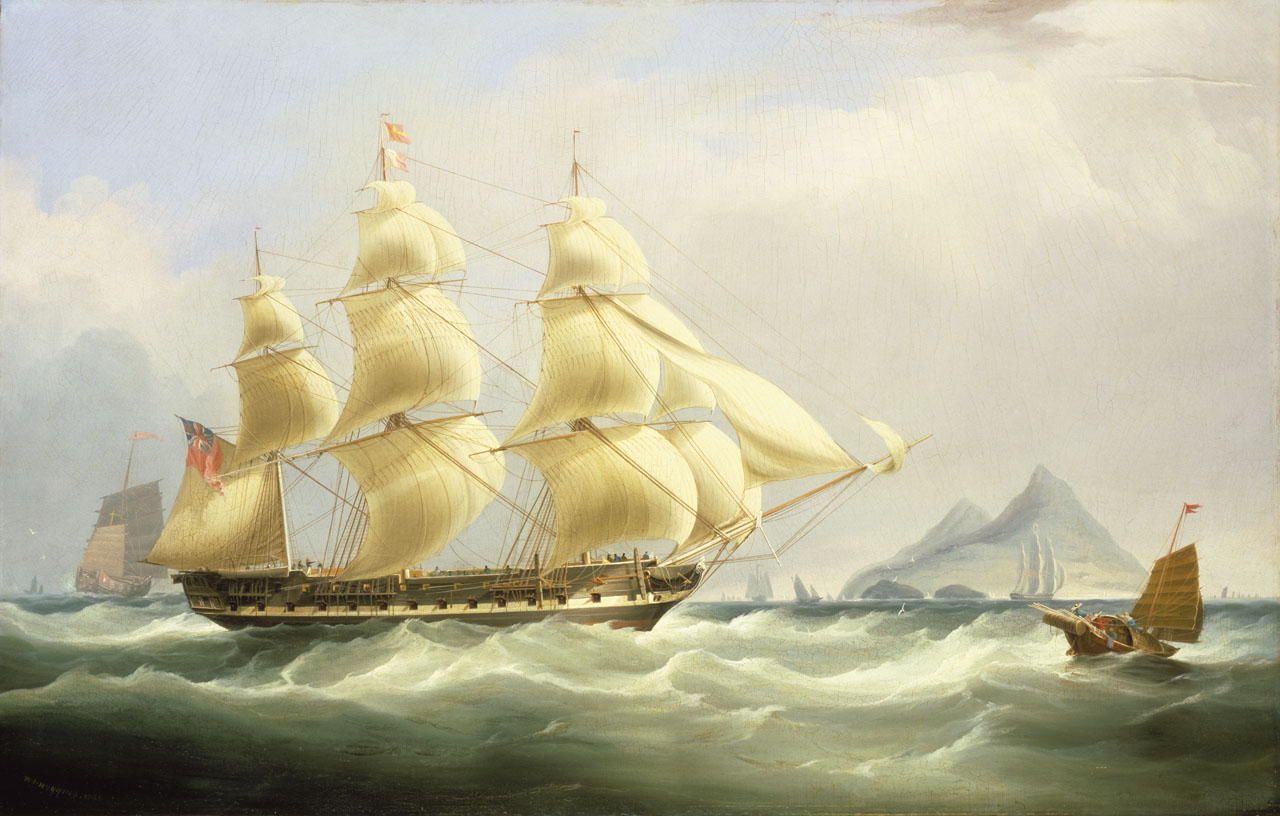
- The East Indiaman Asia, circa 1836

History

United Kingdom
- Owner: EIC voyages 1–9: Henry Bonham; EIC voyage 10: Thomas Heath; 1832: Fairlie & Co.; 1838: E.Moxhay, London
- Builder: Barnard, Deptford
- Launched: 16 November 1811
- Fate: Hulked 1840

General characteristics
- Tons burthen: 958, 95841/94, or 1012 (bm)
- Length: Overall:149 ft 3 in (45.5 m); Keel:120 ft 0 in (36.6 m)
- Beam: 38 ft 9 in (11.8 m)
- Depth of hold: 15 ft 1 in (4.6 m)
- Complement: 118, or 120
- Armament: 32 × 18-pounder guns

Asia was launched in 1811 on the River Thames as an East Indiaman. She made 10 voyages for the British East India Company (EIC). She then continued to sail to India and China after the EIC gave up its trading activities in 1834. She was condemned and hulked in 1840.

== Career ==
EIC voyage #1 (1812–1813): Captain Henry Pendares Tremenheere acquired a letter of marque on 16 January 1812. He sailed from Portsmouth on 10 March 1812, bound for Madras and Bengal. On 20 June Asia reached Johanna. She reached Madras on 3 July and arrived at Diamond Harbour on 29 July. Homeward bound, she was at Saugor on 16 October, reached St Helena on 14 February 1813, and arrived at Blackwall on 30 May.

EIC voyage #2 (1814–1815): Captain Tremenheere sailed on 22 February 1814, bound for Madras.Asia reached Johanna on 6 June and arrived at Madras on 4 July. She visited Vizagapatam on 16 August and returned to Madras on 18 September. She reached the Cape on 20 November and St Helena on 15 December. She arrived on 7 February 1815 in Downs.

EIC voyage #3 (1816–1817): Captain Tremenheere sailed from the Downs on 27 March 1816, bound for Madras and Bengal. Asia reached Madras on 30 July and arrived at the New Anchorage on 30 August. Homeward bound, she was at Vizagapatam on 27 December, Madras on 9 January 1817, and Colombo on 4 February. She reached St Helena on 30 March and arrived at Blackwall on 12 June.

EIC voyage #4 (1818–1819): Captain Thomas Francis Balderston sailed from the Downs on 28 May 1818, bound for Bengal and Madras. Asia arrived at the New Anchorage on 16 September. Homeward bound, she was at Madras on 10 January 1819, Colombo on 4 February, and the Cape on 30 March. She arrived at St Helena on 11 April and arrived at Blackwall on 6 July.

EIC voyage #5 (1820–1821): Captain Balderston sailed from Portsmouth on 2 February 1820, bound for Bengal and China. Asia arrived at New Anchorage on 3 June. She reached Singapore on 4 September and arrived at Whampoa Anchorage on 26 September. Homeward bound, she was at Lintin on 14 February 1821, reached St Helena on 20 April, and arrived back at Blackwall on 14 June.

EIC voyage #6 (1822–1823): Captain Balderston sailed from the Downs on 29 March 1822, bound for Madras and Bengal. Asia reached Madras on 15 July, and arrived at New Anchorage on 17 August. Homeward bound, she reached St Helena on 15 February 1823 and arrived at Blackwall on 23 April.

On 30 July 1823, the EIC accepted a tender from Henry Bonham for Asia for three voyages at a rate of £19 17s 6d for 958 tons.

EIC voyage #7 (1824–1825): Captain Balderston sailed from the Downs on 24 May 1824, bound for Madras and Bengal. Asia reached Madras on 2 September and arrived at Diamond Harbour on 5 October. Homeward bound, she was at Saugor on 8 December and Madras again on 19 January 1825. She reached St Helena on 14 April and arrived at Blackwall on 31 May.

EIC voyage #8 (1826–1827): Captain Balderston sailed from the Downs on 14 June 1826, bound for Bengal. Asia arrived at Diamond Harbour on 20 October. Homeward bound, she was at Saugor on 20 January 1827, reached St Helena on 4 June, and arrived at Blackwall on 1 August.

EIC voyage #9 (1828–1829): Captain Balderston sailed from the Downs on 26 May 1828, bound for Bengal. Asia reached Madras on 8 September and arrived at Diamond Harbour on 23 September. Homeward bound, she was at Saugor on 10 December, reached St Helena on 23 March 1829, and arrived at Blackwall on 21 May.

On 20 September 1831 Asia was sold for £6500 to Thomas Heath.

On 21 September 1831 the EIC chartered Asia, of 1012 tons (bm), for one voyage out and home, at a rate of £11 15s per ton.

EIC voyage #10 (1832–1833): Captain George Kinnaird Bathie sailed from Plymouth on 9 February 1832, bound for Madras, Bengal and China. Asia reached Madras on 24 May, and arrived at Saugor on 1 June. She then was at Singapore on 22 August, and arrived at Whampoa on 6 September. Homeward bound she was at Lintin on 28 November, reached St Helena on 27 January 1833, and arrived at Blackwall on 27 March.

In 1832 Asia was sold to Fairlie & Co.

The EIC ceased its trading activities in 1833 and all British vessels were then free to sail between Britain and the Far East.

| Year | Master | Owner | Trade | Source & notes |
|---|---|---|---|---|
| 1836 | Pearson | T.Heath | London–China | LR |
| 1838 | Gillies | E.Moxhay | London–Calcutta | LR; small repairs 1838 |
| 1839 | Gillies | E.Moxhay | London–Calcutta | LR; small repairs 1838; "wants repair" |

== Fate ==
In 1840, Asia was surveyed, condemned, and hulked. Her entry in the volume of Lloyd's Register for 1840 carried the annotation "Broken Up".
