= Asia (1817 ship) =

Merchant ship in 1817

History

United Kingdom
- Name: Asia
- Owner: W. Stoveld, and Richard Stoveld (managing)
- Builder: Richard Bulmer & Co, Shields
- Launched: 7 October 1817
- Notes: 7 October 1817 (registered)

General characteristics
- Type: Brig
- Tons burthen: 401, or 410, or 41147/94 (bm)
- Length: 108 ft 6 in (33.1 m)
- Beam: 29 ft 11 in (9.1 m)
- Depth: 20 ft 0 in (6.1 m)
- Propulsion: Sail

Asia was a 410-ton merchant brig built at Shields in 1817. During her career she made one voyage for the British East India Company (EIC), and one transporting convicts from England to Van Diemen's Land. She is last listed in 1833 and may have wrecked late that year.

== EIC voyage (1820-21) ==
Captain James Lindsay left Cork on 19 August 1820, bound for Bengal. Asia arrived at Calcutta on 26 January 1821. She was at Diamond Harbour on 19 March and passed Saugor on 2 April. She reached St Helena on 22 July, and arrived at Blackwall on 1 August.

== Convict voyage (1823-24) ==
Under the command of James Lindsay, she sailed from The Downs, England on 9 August 1823, and arrived at Hobart Town on 19 January 1824. She had embarked 150 male convicts and landed all, no convicts having died on the voyage. Asia left Hobart Town on 27 January bound for Sydney. Asia left Sydney on 11 March bound for Madras with part of the 48th Regiment.

== Lloyd's Register ==
Lloyd's Register	Master	Owner	Trade
1818	W. Jackson	Bulmer	London
1819	W. Jackson	Bulmer	London
1820	W. Jackson	Bulmer	London
1821	W. Jackson	Bulmer	London
1822	Lindsay	Bulmer	London-Bombay
1823	Lindsay	Bulmer	London-Fort William; London-NSW
1824	Lindsay	Bulmer	London-NSW
1825	Lindsay	Bulmer	London-NSW
1826	Lindsay	Bulmer	London-NSW
1827	Lindsay	Bulmer	London-NSW
1828	Lindsay	Bulmer	London-NSW
1829	Lindsay	Bulmer	London-NSW
1830	Lindsay; Parker	Bulmer; Stoveld	
1831	Parker	Stoveld	London-Halifax
1832	Parker	Stoveld	London-Halifax
1833	Parker	Stoveld	London-Halifax

The Register of Shipping for 1833 carried Asia with Perkins, master, changing to Stephenson. Her owner was Stowell and her trade London—Halifax.

A barque named Asia was driven ashore and wrecked on 17 November 1833 on the coast of New Orleans Island, Lower Canada. Reportedly, her back had been broken. A report from Quebec dated 18 November stated that she had been surveyed and was not leaking. It was expected that she would proceed later in the fall.

Currently available on line resources do not permit a definite identification of this Asia with the Asia of the news reports. Still, Lloyd's Register did not list her in its 1834 volume.
