= USS Beaufort (1799) =

United States row galley

History

United States
- Name: Beaufort
- Namesake: A city in far southern South Carolina, and the seat of government for Beaufort County, South Carolina
- Commissioned: 1799
- Fate: Sold circa February 1802

General characteristics
- Type: row galley
- Length: 52 ft (16 m)
- Beam: 15 ft (4.6 m)
- Depth: 5 ft 8 in (1.73 m)
- Propulsion: oars
- Complement: 28 sailors
- Armament: one 24-pounder gun, 5 or 6 howitzers

USS Beaufort was a row galley constructed by the citizens of Beaufort, South Carolina, and presented to the United States Government to be used to protect the coast of South Carolina from possible attack by warships of France, which was undergoing political instability following the French Revolution.

Beaufort carried a powerful 24-pounder gun and because it had oars it had the advantage of being able to be rowed to various advantageous firing positions in becalmed seas.

== Service history ==
The first U.S. Navy ship to be named Beaufort, a row galley constructed by the citizens of Beaufort, South Carolina, in 1799, was presented by them to the United States government and was placed in commission by the U.S. Navy around the beginning of the summer of that year, Capt. P. A. Cartwright in command. Beaufort's construction had been occasioned by the undeclared hostilities that broke out at sea between the United States and revolutionary France in 1798. Her duty was to protect the South Carolina coast, harbors, inlets, and waterways from invasions and raids. Since neither of the two countries ever seriously entertained thoughts of invading the other's territory, Beaufort spent her brief career in making uneventful patrols along the South Carolina coast. She was finally sold at public auction in Charleston, South Carolina, sometime around the beginning of February 1802.
