= Ball (surname) =

Ball is an English surname that has multiple potential origins, as do many short surnames:

- one origin suggests that Ball is a shortened form, a "favorite contraction", of the given name Baldwin, dating "from Norman times"
- another purported origin is related to living near a "knoll or rounded hill"
- the surname may also descend from the Old Norse personal name "Balle"
- it could be a toponymic surname, related to Ball, Cornwall, England

According to Bowman, Ball and related names had only "limited application as personal names and that generally they have come into existence as nicknames."

== List of people with the surname ==
=== Arts and music ===
See Writing and education below for writers

- Alan Ball (screenwriter) (born 1957), American screenwriter
- Angeline Ball (born 1969), Irish actor
- Ashleigh Adele Ball (born 1983), Canadian voice actress and singer
- Ashleigh Julia Ball (born 1986), British field hockey player
- Christopher Ball (1936–2022), British composer
- David Ball (electronic musician) (1959–2025), English electronic musician (usually known as Dave), member of Soft Cell, The Grid
- David Ball (country singer) (born 1953), American country singer
- Dave Ball (guitarist) (1950–2015), guitarist formerly of Procol Harum, Bedlam, Long John Baldry, etc.
- Dave "Taif" Ball, British bass guitarist with metal bands Killing Joke and Voodoocult
- Ed Ball (musician) (born 1959), English singer-songwriter, musician and businessman
- Estil C. Ball (1913–1978), American folk musician
- F. Carlton Ball (1911–1992), American multidisciplinary artist and teacher
- Jack Ball (artist), Australian artist, winner of the 2025 Ramsay Art Prize
- John Ball (musician) (born 1990), American Christian musician
- Kenny Ball (1930–2013), English jazz musician
- Kirshnik Ball (1994–2022), American rapper known professionally as Takeoff (name is also written as "Kirsnick" as, for example, in ASCAP's repertory)
- Lucille Ball (1911–1989), American comedian and actor
- Marcia Ball (born 1949), American blues singer and pianist
- Martin Ball (born 1964), English actor
- Martin J. Ball (born 1951), Welsh professor
- Matthew Ball (dancer) (born 1993), English ballet dancer
- Michael Ball (born 1962), English actor and singer
- Nicholas Ball (actor) (1946–2024), English actor
- Robert Ball (artist) (1918–2008), British artist
- Roger Ball (designer), American industrial designer
- Russell Ball (1891–1942), American photographer
- Bobby Ball (1944–2020), English comedian
- Thomas Ball (artist) (1819–1911), American sculptor
- Walter Ball (cartoonist) (1911–1995)
- Wilfrid Ball (1853–1917), British painter
- William Ball (director), American stage director (1931–1991)
- Zoe Ball (born 1970), English radio and television personality

=== Business ===
- The Ball brothers (Lucius, William, Edmund, Frank, and George), 19th-century American industrialists and philanthropists
- Decimus Alfred Ball (1836–1890), British slumlord
- Edward Ball (businessman) (1888–1981), American businessman and political figure
- Ernie Ball (1930–2004), American entrepreneur, musician, and guitar innovator
- Harvey Ball (1921–2001), American entrepreneur; earliest known designer of the Smiley

=== Media ===
- Dave Ball, Survivor: Samoa competitor
- Johnny Ball (born 1938), English children's television presenter
- Krystal Ball (born 1981), American political pundit, co-host of Breaking Points Krystal & Saagar
- Molly Ball, American political journalist and writer

=== Military ===
- Albert Ball (1896–1917), English World War I fighter pilot; recipient of the Victoria Cross
- Alexander Ball (c. 1756–1809), English admiral of the Royal Navy and Governor of Malta
- Henry Lidgbird Ball (1756–1818), British Royal Navy officer who discovered and explored Lord Howe Island
- William L. Ball III (born 1948), United States Secretary of the Navy

=== Politics, law, and diplomacy ===
- Bartholomew Ball (died 1573), Mayor of Dublin 1553–1554
- Edward Ball (congressman) (1811–1872), American national politician
- Frank Livingston Ball (1885–1966), American state politician
- Gregory R. Ball (born 1977), American state politician
- Hiram J. Ball (1832–1908), American state politician and farmer
- John Ball (16th-century MP) (c.1518–1556), English Member of Parliament (MP) for Norwich
- John Ball (assemblyman) (1756–1838), American soldier and politician
- John Thomas Ball (1815–1898), Irish barrister and politician, MP for Dublin University 1868–1875
- Joseph H. Ball (1905–1993), American journalist and national politician
- L. Heisler Ball (1861–1932), American physician and national politician
- Maud Ball, British politician
- Mottrom D. Ball (1835–1887), American government official
- Nicholas Ball (alderman) (died 1609), Mayor of Dublin 1582–1583
- Nicholas Ball (Irish lawyer) (died 1865), Irish barrister
- Richard Thomas Ball (1857–1937), Australian engineer and politician
- Robert James Ball (1857–1928), Canadian politician
- Thomas Henry Ball (1859–1944), American national politician
- Thomas R. Ball (1896–1943), U.S. Representative from Connecticut
- Walter Ball (alderman) (died 1598), Mayor of Dublin 1580–1581
- Whitney Lynn Ball (1962–2015), American philanthropist
- William Lee Ball (1781–1824), Virginia congressman
- William Macmahon Ball (1901–1986), Australian academic and diplomat

=== Religion ===
- David Ball (bishop) (1926–2017), Episcopal bishop of Albany, NY
- David Standish Ball (1926–2017), American Episcopal bishop
- John Ball (bishop) (1934–2016), British Anglican bishop
- John Ball (clergyman) (before 1760 – after 1795), African-American minister from Nova Scotia
- John Ball (minister) (1665–1745), English Presbyterian minister
- John Ball (priest) (c. 1338 – 1381), English radical priest and leader of 1381 Peasants' Revolt
- Margaret Ball (1515–1584), beatified by the Roman Catholic Church as martyr of the faith
- Michael Ball (bishop) (born 1932), English Anglican clergyman; former Bishop of Truro
- Peter Ball (bishop) (1932–2019), disgraced Bishop of Lewes and twin brother of Michael Ball

=== Sciences and mathematics ===
- Alice Ball (1892–1916), American chemist; invented the Ball Method for treating leprosy
- Benjamin Ball (physician) (1833–1893), English-born French psychiatrist
- Catherine Ball, English-Australian businesswomen involved in making drones
- Elmer Darwin Ball (1870–1943), American entomologist
- Ernest Aubrey Ball (1909–1997), American botanist
- George Ball (entomologist) (1926–2019), American entomologist
- John M. Ball (born 1948), British mathematician
- John Ball (cognitive scientist) (born 1963), American cognitive scientist
- John Ball (geologist) (1872–1941), English geologist
- John Ball (naturalist) (1818–1889), Irish naturalist and politician, MP for County Carlow 1857–1880
- Keith Martin Ball (born 1960), English mathematician
- Leo Anton Karl de Ball (1853–1916), German-Austrian astronomer
- Loren C. Ball (born 1948), American astronomer
- Mary Ball (1812–1892), Irish naturalist and entomologist
- Pamela Ball (1926–2019), Jamaican-British surgeon
- Peter William Ball (born 1932), English-born Canadian botanist
- Robert Ball (naturalist) (1802–1857), Irish naturalist
- Robert Stawell Ball (1840–1913), Irish astronomer
- W. W. Rouse Ball (1850–1925), British mathematician
- Webb C. Ball (1847–1922), American railroad engineer who established the first rules for railroad chronometers
- William Ball (astronomer) (or Balle), British astronomer; founder Fellow of the Royal Society

=== Sports ===
- Alan Ball Jr. (1945–2007), English professional footballer and football club manager
- Alan Ball Sr. (1924–1982), English professional footballer and football club manager
- Alan Ball (American football) (born 1985)
- Alan Ball (weightlifter) (born 1943), American Olympic weightlifter
- Alf Ball (footballer, born 1890) (1890–1952), English footballer
- Alf Ball (footballer, born 1873) (1873–1940), English footballer
- Allan Ball (1943–2018), English footballer with Queen of the South
- Arnie Ball (born 1944), American volleyball coach; father of Lloy Ball (below)
- Ashleigh Ball (field hockey) (born 1986), English field hockey player
- Bobby Ball (racing driver) (1925–1954), American racing driver
- Cameron Ball (born 2003), American football player
- Carsten Ball (born 1987), Australian tennis player
- Catie Ball (born 1951), American Olympic swimmer
- Chris Ball (born 1963), American football coach and former player
- Dave Ball (defensive end) (born 1981), American football player
- David Ball (footballer) (born 1989), English footballer
- David Ball (wide receiver) (born 1984), American football player
- David Ball (sport shooter), British sport shooter
- Eric Ball (American football) (born 1966), American football player
- Jeff Ball (baseball) (born 1969), baseball player
- John Ball (golfer) (1861–1940), English amateur golfer; winner of The Open Championship
- Jack Ball (footballer, born 1900) (1900–1989), English footballer for Bury and England
- Jack Ball (footballer, born 1907) (1907–1976), English football forward
- Jack Ball (footballer, born 1923) (1923–1999), English football goalkeeper
- John Ball (footballer, born 1925) (1925–1998), English footballer for Bolton Wanderers
- John Ball (soccer) (born 1972), American footballer for Rochester Rhinos
- Josh Ball (born 1998), American football player
- Kevin Ball (born 1964), soccer player
- A family of American sportspeople:
  - LaVar Ball (born 1968), football player, father of the following basketball players:
  - Lonzo Ball (born 1997)
  - LiAngelo Ball (born 1998)
  - LaMelo Ball (born 2001)
- Lloy Ball (born 1972), American volleyball player
- Luke Ball (born 1984), Australian rules footballer
- Michael Ball (American football) (born 1964), American football player
- Michael Ball (footballer) (born 1979), English professional footballer
- Montee Ball (born 1990), American professional football player
- Neal Ball (1881–1957), baseball player
- Neiron Ball (1992–2019), American football player
- Phil Ball (American football) (1925–2008), college football coach
- Phil Ball (baseball) (1864–1932), owner of the St. Louis Terriers
- Rachel Ball (born 1991), English boxer
- Reggie Ball (born 1984), American professional football player
- Robert Ball (bowls) (born 1956), Australian lawn bowler
- Robert Ball (judoka) (born 1964), Australian judoka
- Rudi Ball (1910–1975), German-South African; only athlete of Jewish descent to represent Germany in the 1936 Winter Olympic Games; Hall of Fame
- Sam Ball (1944–2023), NFL lineman
- Stacey Ball (born 1973), Canadian pair skater
- Walter Ball (baseball) (1877–1946), Negro league baseball player
- William Ball (footballer), English footballer (1886–1942)

=== Writing and education ===
- Catherine Ball, known as the Baroness de Calabrella (c. 1788–1856), British writer and newspaper owner
- Clifford Ball (1908–1947), American author
- David W. Ball (born 1949), American novelist
- Donna Ball (born 1951), American novelist
- Edward Ball (American author) (born 1958)
- Hugo Ball (1886–1927), German author and poet
- Isabel Worrell Ball (1855–1931), American journalist and editor
- John Ball (Puritan) (1585–1640), English author and scholar
- John Ball (pioneer) (1794–1884), American explorer
- John Ball (novelist) (1911–1988), American novelist
- Phil Ball (writer) (born 1957), British writer based in Spain
- Philip Ball (born 1962), English science writer
- Samuel Ball (educator) (1935–2009), Australian education researcher

=== Other ===
- Edward Hughes Ball (1798–1863), later Edward Hughes Ball Hughes or "The Golden Ball", British dandy
- Helen Ball, senior British police officer
- Martha Violet Ball (1811–1894), American educator, philanthropist, activist, writer, editor
- Mary Ball Washington (1706–1789), mother of George Washington
- Robert M. Ball (1914–2008), American Social Security official
- Robert W. Ball (1943–2022), Canadian naval architect
- Ron Ball (born 1950), British Police and Crime Commissioner
- William Ball (suffragist) (1862–?), British workers union member, jailed and force-fed for his support of women's suffrage
- Willis Ball, American architect

== See also ==
- Ball
- Ball (disambiguation)
- Human name disambiguation pages: Alan Ball (disambiguation), David Ball (disambiguation), John Ball (disambiguation), Phil Ball (disambiguation), Robert Ball (disambiguation)
