= Ball (disambiguation) =

A ball is a spherical round object with various uses.

Ball(s) or The Ball may also refer to:

== Places ==
- Ball (crater), a crater on the Moon
- Ball, Cornwall, a hamlet in the north of Cornwall, England, UK
- Ball, Louisiana, a town in Rapides Parish, Louisiana, US
- Balls (mountain range), a mountain range in Madera County, California, US

== People ==
- Ball (surname), a list of people with the surname Ball
- Balls (gamer), an American League of Legends player
- Balls Mahoney, an American professional wrestler
- Alastair Balls, a Scottish economist
- Andrew Balls, a British economist
- Ed Balls, a British politician
- Jonathan Balls, an English serial killer
- Katy Balls, a British journalist
- Mara Balls, a Finnish singer-songwriter
- Michael Balls, a British zoologist
- Norah Balls (1886–1980), British suffragette, women's rights campaigner, magistrate, councillor
- William Lawrence Balls, a British botanist

== Anatomy ==
- Ball (foot), a bottom part of the foot
- Balls, a slang word for testicles, which may also apply to chutzpah or bravery

== Arts and entertainment ==
=== Film and theatre ===
- Le Bal (1931 film), a French film
- The Ball (1958 film) (Mingea), a Romanian film
- Le Bal (1983 film), an Algerian film
- Balls (film) (Swedish: Farsan), a 2010 Swedish comedy film
- The Ball (2011), an Australian documentary, runner up for the 2011 AACTA Award for Best Documentary Under One Hour
- The Ball (play), a 1632 play by James Shirley

=== Games ===
- Ball (Game & Watch), a game for the Nintendo Game & Watch
- Ballz, a 1994 fighting game
- The Ball (video game), a 2010 video game

=== Music ===
==== Groups ====
- Balls (rock band), a 1969–1971 British rock band
- B.A.L.L., a 1987–1990 American rock band

==== Albums ====
- Ball (Iron Butterfly album), 1969
- Ball (Widespread Panic album), 2003
- Balls (Elizabeth Cook album), 2007
- Balls (Sparks album), 2000
- Balls (EP), by Guttermouth, 1991
- Balls, by Napoleon Murphy Brock, 2003

==== Songs ====
- "Ball" (song), by T.I., 2012
- "Ball", by DJ Khaled from Victory, 2010
- "Ball", by Susumu Hirasawa from Sword-Wind Chronicle BERSERK Original Soundtrack, 1997
- "The Ball", from the musical Natasha, Pierre & The Great Comet of 1812, 2012
- "Balls", by Black Spiders, 2013
- "Un bal", the second movement of Symphonie fantastique by Hector Berlioz, 1830

=== Television ===
- Balls (TV channel), a defunct Filipino sports channel
- "The Ball" (Dynasty 1985), an episode
- "The Ball" (Dynasty 1986), an episode
- "The Ball" (Kanon), an episode
- "Balls" (Northern Exposure), an episode

== Brands and enterprises ==
- Ball (St. Paul's Churchyard), an historical bookseller in London
- Ball Corporation, a U.S. packaging manufacturer and metal can maker
- Ball Watch Company

== Computing and technology ==
- BALL (Biochemical Algorithms Library), a versatile set of C++ classes for molecular modelling
- Blog Assisted Language Learning, an application of computer-assisted language learning

== Schools ==
- Ball High School, a public secondary school in Galveston, Texas, US
- Ball State University, Muncie, Indiana, US

== Social gatherings ==
- Ball (dance event)
- The Ball (event), a NYC Jewish singles event on Christmas Eve

== Sports ==
- Ball (rhythmic gymnastics)
- Bandy ball
- Baseball (ball), the physical object
  - Ball (baseball statistics), a pitch outside the strike zone and not swung at by the batter
- Basketball (ball)
- Billiard ball
- Bowling ball
- Cricket ball, the physical object
  - Ball (cricket) or delivery, a single action of bowling
- Football (ball)
  - Ball (association football)
  - Gaelic ball
  - Ball (gridiron football)
  - Rugby ball
- Golf ball
- Lacrosse ball
- Pickleball, the ball used in the game
  - Ball!, a warning of an errant ball on the court
- Tennis ball
- Volleyball (ball)
- Water polo ball, used in Waterpolo and Canoe polo

== Other uses ==
- Ball (bearing), special highly spherical and smooth balls, most commonly used in ball bearings
- Ball (mathematics), the solid interior of a sphere
- Times Square Ball or the Ball
- Round shot or cannonball or ball, a round projectile fired from guns and cannons

== See also ==
- Bawl (disambiguation)
- Bawls, a high-caffeine soft drink
- Thermoball, a swarm of insects (especially bees) in collective defense against larger insects, such as predatory wasps
- Category:Balls, an index of game balls and other types of round balls
