= John Ball =

Jack, Johnny, or John Ball may refer to:

== Arts and media ==
- Jack Ball (artist), Australian artist, winner of the 2025 Ramsay Art Prize
- John Ball (musician) (born 1990), American Christian musician
- Johnny Ball (born 1938), English children's television presenter
- John Ball (novelist) (1911–1988), American novelist
- John Ball (Puritan) (1585–1640), English author and scholar

== Clergy ==
- John Ball (priest) (c. 1338 – 1381), English radical priest and leader of 1381 Peasants' Revolt
- John Ball (minister) (1665–1745), English Presbyterian minister
- John Ball (clergyman) (before 1760 – after 1795), African-American minister from Nova Scotia
- John Ball (bishop) (1934–2016), British Anglican bishop

== Politicians ==
=== England ===
- John Ball (16th-century MP) (c.1518–1556), English member of parliament (MP) for Norwich

=== Ireland ===
- John Ball (Drogheda MP) (c. 1754–1813), MP for Drogheda in the Irish House of Commons
- John Ball (naturalist) (1818–1889), Irish naturalist and politician, MP for County Carlow 1857–1880
- John Thomas Ball (1815–1898), Irish barrister and politician, MP for Dublin University 1868–1875

=== United States ===
- John Ball (assemblyman) (1756–1838), American soldier and politician
- John Ball (pioneer) (1794–1884), American pioneer and state politician

== Sport ==
=== Football ===
- Jack Ball (footballer, born 1900) (1900–1989), English footballer for Bury and England
- Jack Ball (footballer, born 1907) (1907–1976), English football forward
- Jack Ball (footballer, born 1923) (1923–1999), English football goalkeeper
- John Ball (footballer, born 1925) (1925–1998), English footballer for Bolton Wanderers
- John Ball (soccer, born 1972), American footballer for Rochester Rhinos
- John Henry Ball (1856–1943), English footballer for Aston Villa

=== Other sports ===
- John Ball (golfer) (1861–1940), English amateur golfer; winner of The Open Championship

== Other people ==
- John Ball (cognitive scientist) (born 1963), American cognitive scientist
- John Ball (geologist) (1872–1941), English geologist
- Sir John M. Ball (born 1948), English mathematician

== See also ==
- John Bull (disambiguation)
- John Ball Primary School, primary school in Blackheath, London
