= John Bull (disambiguation) =

John Bull (1712), a caricature and national personification of the United Kingdom.

John Bull may also refer to:

== People ==
- John Bull (businessman) (1672–1742), English businessman and Sheriff of London
- John Bull (composer) (c. 1562–1628), Baroque English composer and musician
- John Bull (gunman) (1836–1929), gunman of the American Old West
- John Bull (Missouri politician) (1803–1863), American politician from Missouri
- John Bull (Pennsylvania politician) (1731–1824), American politician and military officer from Pennsylvania
- John Bull (priest) (fl. 1826–1830), Archdeacon of Barnstaple
- John Bull (prophet) (died 1642), English self-proclaimed prophet
- John Bull (South Carolina politician) (c. 1740–1802), American statesman, Continental Congressman from South Carolina
- John Edward Bull (1806–1901), British Army officer and public servant in New South Wales
- John S. Bull (1934–2008), American pilot and astronaut
- John Wrathall Bull (1804–1886), settler, inventor and colonial author of South Australia

== Other ==
- John Bull (locomotive), an 1831 British-built railroad steam locomotive
- John Bull (magazine), a series of British periodicals
- John Bull (horse) (1789–1812), a British Thoroughbred racehorse and sire
- John Bull (play), 1803 play by George Colman the Younger
- John Bull Bitter, a product of Star Brewery
- John Bull (1798 ship), a French prize captured in 1798
- John Bull (1799 ship), a sailing ship built in 1799
- John Bull (1800 ship), a French vessel that from 1800 became a British privateer
- John Bull (1815 ship), built at Fort Gloster, Calcutta

== See also ==
- John Ball (disambiguation)
- Johan Bull (disambiguation)
- Jack Bull, the ring name of professional wrestler Gregg Groothuis
- Jonny Bull, a member of the band Rialto
- The Jack Bull, a 1999 Western film
