= Alf Ball =

Alf Ball may refer to:

- Alf Ball (footballer, born 1890) (1890–1952), English footballer for Lincoln City
- Alf Ball (footballer, born 1873) (1873–1940), English footballer for Leicester Fosse and Preston North End

== See also ==
- Alfred Ball (1921–2012), Royal Air Force officer
