= Golden Ball =

Golden Ball may refer to:

== Awards ==
  - Golden Ball Award, FIFA competition award for best player of tournament
  - FIFA World Cup Golden Ball, FIFA World Cup award for best player of tournament
  - FIFA U-20 World Cup Golden Ball, FIFA U-20 World Cup award for best player of tournament
  - FIFA U-17 World Cup Golden Ball, FIFA U-20 World Cup award for best player of tournament
  - FIFA Women's World Cup Golden Ball, FIFA Women's World Cup award for best player of tournament
  - FIFA U-20 Women's World Cup Golden Ball, FIFA U-20 Women's World Cup award for best player of tournament
  - FIFA U-17 Women's World Cup Golden Ball, FIFA U-17 Women's World Cup award for best player of tournament
  - FIFA Club World Cup Golden Ball, FIFA Club World Cup award for best player of tournament
  - FIFA Confederations Cup Golden Ball, FIFA Confederations Cup award for best player of tournament
- Ballon d'Or, an international annual association football award
  - FIFA Ballon d'Or (2010–2015), annual association football award created with the merger of Ballon d'Or and FIFA World Player of the Year between 2010 and 2015
- Golden Ball (Czech Republic), association football award
- Hungarian Golden Ball, annual association football award
- Portuguese Golden Ball, annual association football award
- Vietnamese Golden Ball, annual association football award

== Facilities and structures ==
- Golden Ball (stadium), an Irish association football stadium and home ground for Wayside Celtic F.C.
- Golden Ball (St. Paul's Churchyard), a historical bookseller in London
- Golden Ball, Poulton-le-Fylde, a pub and hotel in England
- Golden Ball, York, a pub in York, England

== People ==
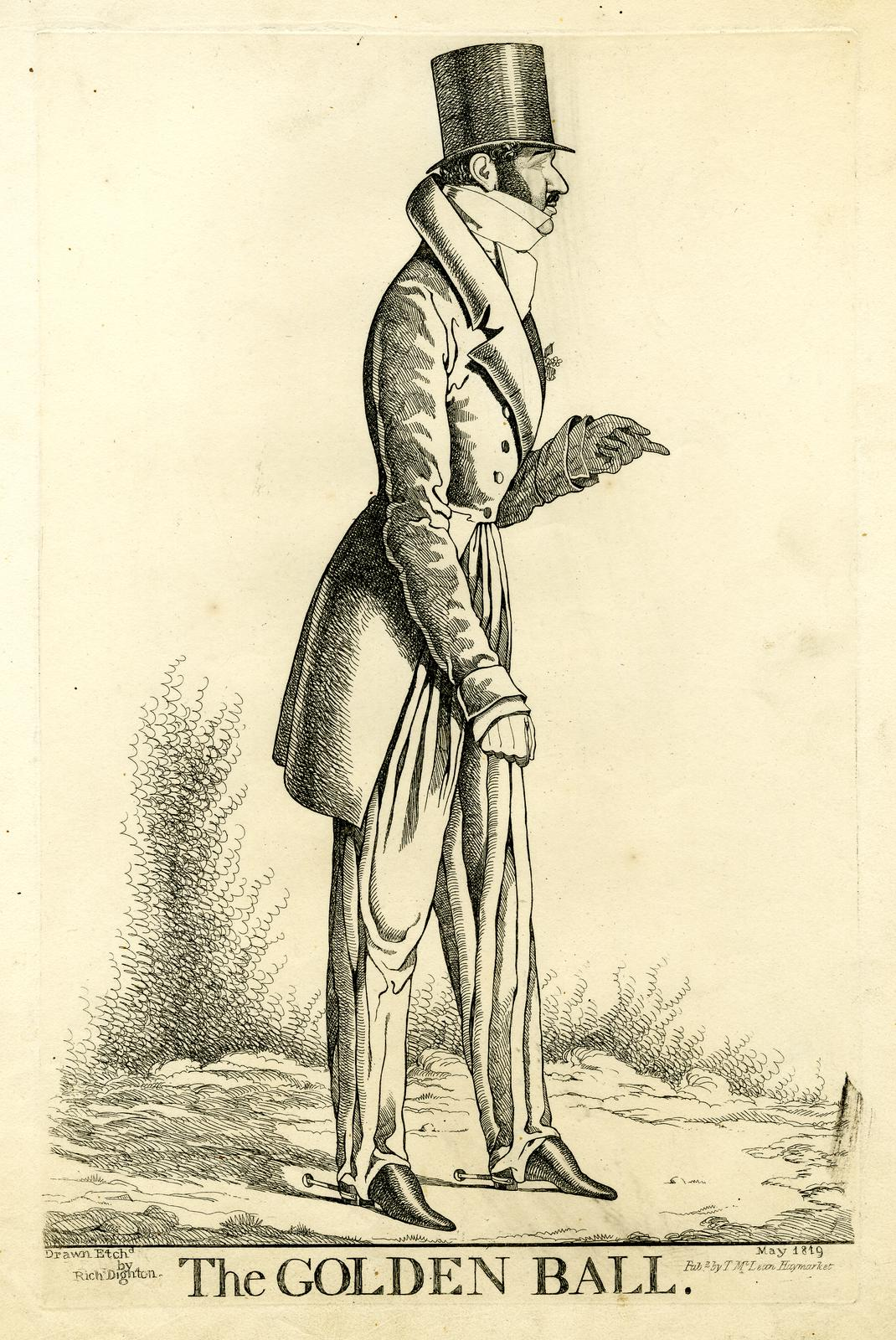
The Golden Ball (Edward Hughes Ball Hughes) in 1819

- Edward Hughes Ball Hughes (1798–1863), an English dandy of the Regency period, nicknamed 'The Golden Ball'
- David Beckham (born 1975), English footballer, nicknamed "Golden Balls"

== Arts and entertainment ==
- Golden Balls, a 2007–2009 British daytime TV game show
- The Golden Ball and Other Stories, a 1971 short-story collection by Agatha Christie
- Golden Balls (film), a 1993 Spanish film
- Golden Balls (video game), a 2008 video game developed by Mindscape

== Other ==
- Echinocactus grusonii, or Golden Ball cactus, a critically endangered species
- The traditional three-ball symbol for a pawnbroker

== See also ==
- Golden Globe (disambiguation)
- Golden (disambiguation)
- Ball (disambiguation)
