= Robert Ball =

Robert Ball may refer to:

- Robert Ball (judoka) (born 1964), Australian judoka
- Robert Ball (naturalist) (1802–1857), Irish naturalist
- Robert James Ball (1857–1928), Canadian politician
- Robert M. Ball (1914–2008), American social security official
- Robert Stawell Ball (1840–1913), Irish astronomer
- Robert W. Ball (1943–2022), Canadian naval architect
- Robert Ball (artist) (1918–2008), British artist
- Robert Ball (bowls) (born 1956), Australian lawn bowler
- Robert Ball (mayor) (died 1635), mayor of Dublin
- Robert T. Ball Jr., public health and infectious disease specialist
- Bobby Ball (1944–2020), English comedian
- Bobby Ball (racing driver) (1925–1954), American racing driver
- Robert Ball, American actor, known for Who's Minding the Mint?

== See also ==
- Robert Ball Hughes (1804–1868), British-American sculptor
