= John Bull (ship) =

Several vessels have borne the name John Bull, named for the figure John Bull:

- John Bull was a Falmouth packet that made two voyages on the Falmouth–Halifax, Nova Scotia–New York–Halifax–Falmouth route, one between 15 July 1790 and 15 November, and the other between 12 April 1791 and 24 July.
- John Bull (1798 ship) was a French brig captured in 1798 and renamed. She commenced one voyage as a slaver but wrecked in 1802.
- John Bull (1799 ship) was a ship launched at Liverpool in 1799. She spent most of her career as a West Indiaman, trading between Liverpool and Jamaica, but also made one voyage as a Guineaman (slave ship). She was briefly a privateer with at least one capture to her credit, and made one voyage transporting female convicts to New South Wales. She then made an unsuccessful voyage as a whaler in the Pacific. She was last listed in 1833.
- John Bull (1800 ship) was a French vessel that from 1800 to circa 1805 sailed as a British privateer operating out of Jersey. Her master was plaintiff in a notable case involving the law of salvage. She returned to mercantile trading and was wrecked in 1810.
- John Bull (1815 ship) was built in 1815 at Fort Gloster, Calcutta. She carried convicts from India to Mauritius and Sydney, and traded between India and Mauritius and New South Wales. She was sold in New South Wales in 1824. Until mid-1827 she traded first with Tasmania, and then with Canton. In June 1827 she became a whaler based in Sydney and made two complete voyages. She disappeared without a trace after November 1830 while on her third whaling voyage.

== See also ==
- HM Hired armed cutter John Bull
