= John Marrant =

American Methodist preacher and missionary

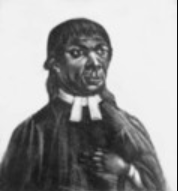

Orders
- Ordination: May 15, 1785

Personal details
- Born: June 15, 1755 New York City, New York
- Died: April 15, 1791 (aged 35) Islington, London, England
- Denomination: Huntingdonian church
- Spouse: Elizabeth (Herries) Marrant
- Occupation: Minister, missionary
- Education: Countess of Huntingdon's Connexion

John Marrant (June 15, 1755 – April 15, 1791) was an American Methodist preacher and missionary and one of the first black preachers in North America.

Born free in New York City, he moved as a child with his family to Charleston, South Carolina. His father died when he was young, and he and his mother also lived in Florida and Georgia. After escaping to the Cherokee, with whom he lived for two years, he allied with the British during the American Revolutionary War and resettled afterward in London. There he became involved with the Countess of Huntingdon's Connexion and ordained as a preacher.

Marrant was supported to travel in 1785 as a preacher and missionary to Nova Scotia, where he founded a Methodist church in Birchtown. He married there before settling in Boston, Massachusetts. In 1790 he returned to London. He wrote a memoir about his life, published in 1785 in London as A Narrative of the Lord's Wonderful Dealings with John Marrant, a black; also published were a 1789 sermon, and a journal in 1790 covering the previous five years of his life.

== Early life ==
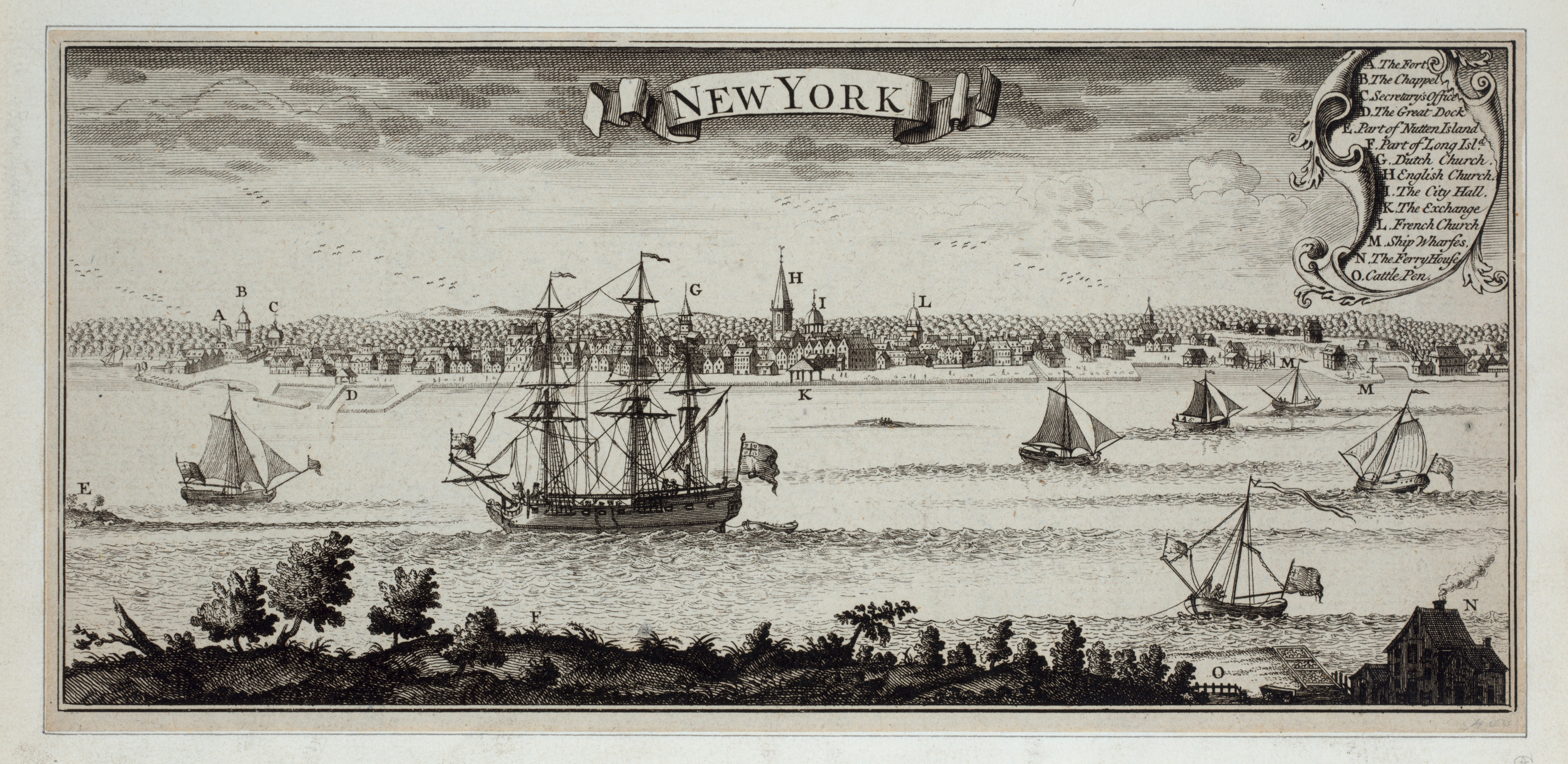
View of New York Harbor, 1727

Marrant was born free in New York City on June 15, 1755, (Note: His name is sometimes spelled in records as Morant. He was incorrectly stated to have been born in 1775.) the second youngest child in his family; he had two older sisters and an older brother, and a younger sister. Their father died in 1759 when Marrant was four.

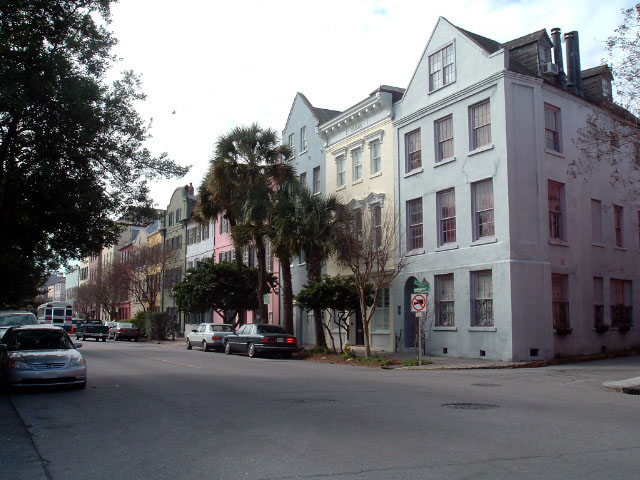
Rainbow Row's 13 houses along East Bay Street formed the commercial center of the town in the colonial period.

His mother moved the family to St. Augustine, Florida, where Marrant started school, which was unique for black children. After 18 months in Florida and during the Seven Years' War, Marrant's mother moved the family to Georgia, which was a British colony at that time. He continued in school until the age of 11, learning to read and write. (His mother remarried at some time, and an older sister married in Charleston.) After they moved to Charleston, South Carolina, Marrant became interested in music and learned to play the French horn and violin. He frequently entertained the local gentry at balls and social gatherings. He studied music for two years, & then was an apprentice carpenter for more than one year.

== Religious journey ==
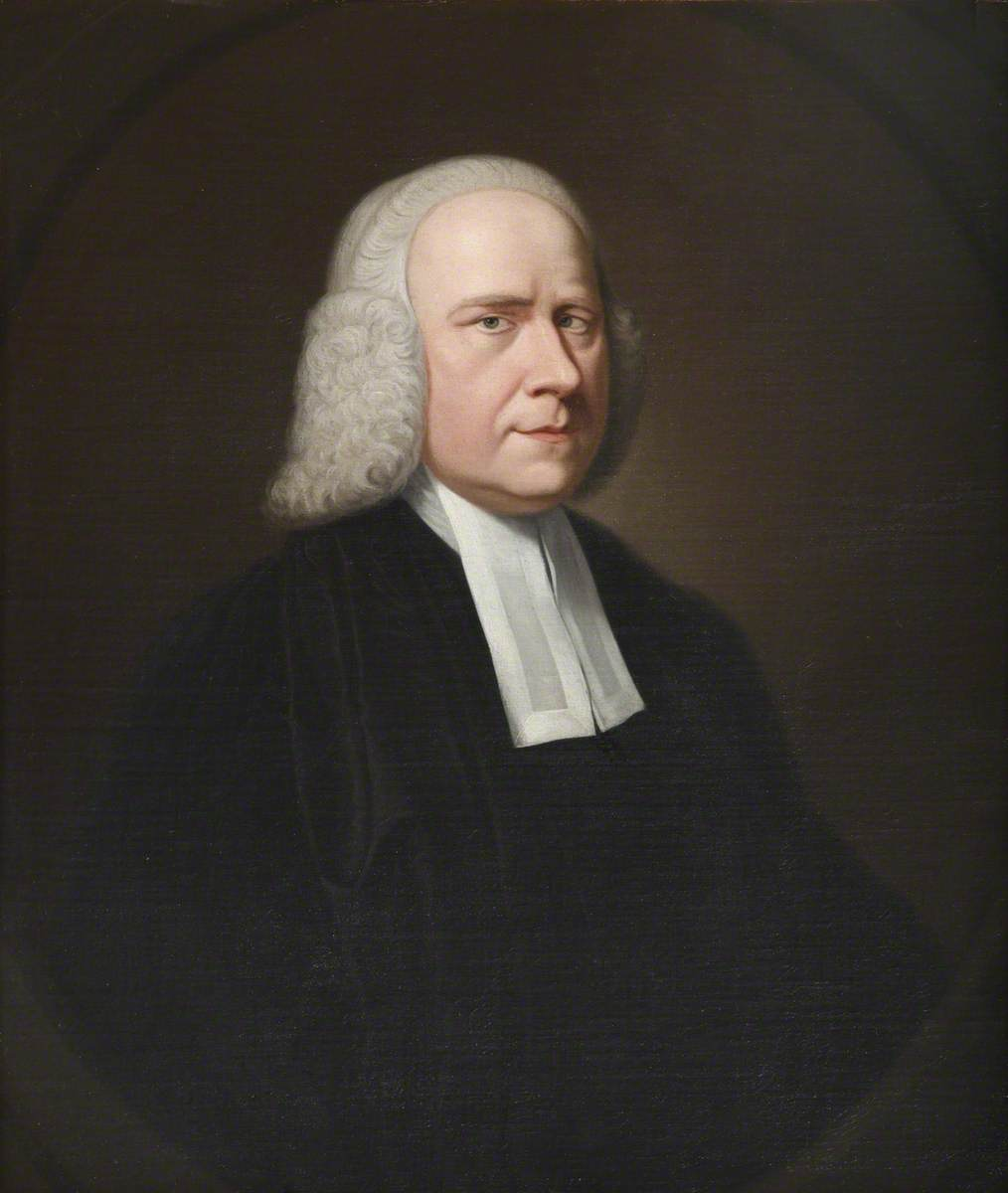
George Whitefield

At the age of 13, about 1768, Marrant and a friend went to hear Methodist preacher George Whitefield, who was active in the South during the Great Awakening. He experienced a dramatic conversion, falling to the floor in a faint or illness. Unable to move or speak for half an hour, he was carried from the meeting to his home. Doctors were called, but he refused medicine. He got better by studying the Bible, but his steadfastness to Biblical study was troubling to his family. It was about this time that his family became concerned about some bizarre behavior by Marrant. They treated him as if he was mentally unstable. After disagreements with his family about religion, he left home, and wandered into a forest outside the city, relying on God to feed and protect him.

He was found by a Cherokee hunter who knew his family but whom he persuaded not to take him back to town. Marrant traveled and hunted with the Cherokee for more than two months to gather furs for trade. They went to the man's fortified Cherokee town, where Marrant was stopped from entry. Told he did not have sufficient reason to be there, he was sentenced to death. Marrant's prayers to Jesus appeared to convert the executioner, who argued with the sentencing judge and arranged for Marrant to meet the king, who spared his life. They all heard him pray in English and Cherokee.

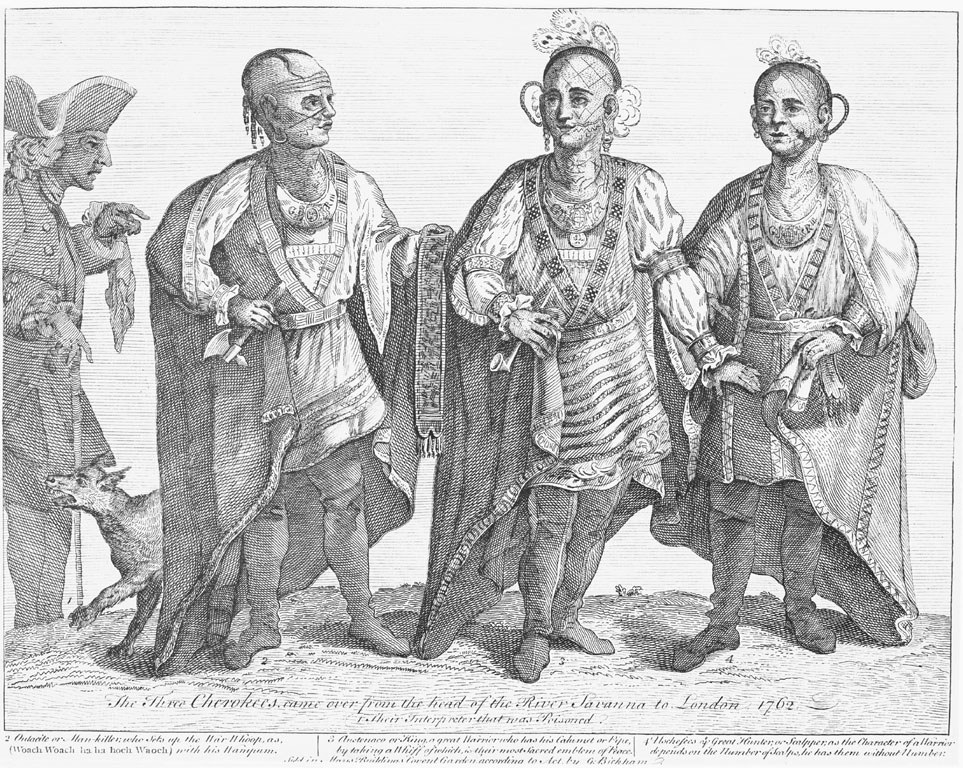
Three Cherokee, 1762

Marrant lived with the Cherokee for two years during which he had visited with other tribes of the area, including Catawa, Housaw, and Creek people. He converted a number of Native Americans and is thought to have been an influence in creating lasting bonds between black and Cherokee people.

He wore Native American style clothing made of animal skins. He had no pants, but wore a sash around his middle, and a long pendant that went down his back. When he returned to Charleston, his family did not initially recognize him. Marrant was deeply relieved when his sister recognized him. He stated in his journal: "thus the dead was brought to life again; thus the lost was found." His experience is related to that of Lazarus and Joseph, both of whom were important figures among black Christians who were enslaved or held captive and longed for freedom and a rebirth. He sought work on plantations as a free carpenter, and conducted missionary work with slaves until the start of the American Revolution. Although some owners objected, others allowed slaves to become Christianized.

== American Revolutionary War ==
During the American Revolutionary War, Marrant was impressed into the Royal Navy, serving as a musician for more than six years before being discharged in 1782. In 1780, he was at the Siege of Charleston. One year later, he was wounded in the Battle of Dogger Bank. He described battles in his Narrative, but official records do not document him as having served with the Navy.

During the war, Black slaves were told that if they served the British Crown, they would gain their freedom. There were 3,000 people who took the agreement and were called Black Loyalists. In 1783, they were transported to Nova Scotia after their names were recorded in the Book of Negroes, also called the New York City Inspection Roll of Negroes. The Black Loyalists were interested in learning about Christianity. Marrant's brother sent him a letter asking for him to come to Nova Scotia. (Note: A John Marrant was identified in the Book of Negroes as the owner of Melia Marrant and two children, who were believed to be his family members from Charleston, according to Devona Mallory in African American Lives. Mellia Marrant and her children, Amelia (6) and Ben (4), were said to be Marrant's chattel property in the Book of Negroes. It has also been thought that she could be a sibling or a former wife. In 1783, Mellia Marrant was 30 years of age, born about 1753. She left John Marrant at the Siege of Charleston (1780). With her children, on June 13, 1783, she travelled from New York aboard the William & Mary for Annapolis Royal. It is more likely that Melia was the slave of John Mayrant, a slave owner, of Santee, South Carolina, or his son, John Mayrant, who served as a lieutenant in the South Carolina Navy and was also a slave owner. There is no evidence that the author, John Marrant, ever owned slaves.) (Note: There is no information that identifies his brother's name or other identifying information beyond being a Black Loyalist in Nova Scotia.)

== Ministry ==
Marrant worked for a clothing or cotton merchant in London after he was discharged from the Navy. While in London, he met Rev. Whitehead and told him of his dramatic conversion. Whitehead introduced him to Selina Hastings, Countess of Huntingdon, who encouraged him to become a minister. He thus joined the ministry of the Countess of Huntingdon's Connexion, which was a sect that practiced a combination of Calvinism and Methodism. It separated from the Church of England in 1783. After he was ordained as a preacher on May 15, 1785, in Bath, Marrant left for Nova Scotia. After an eleven-week journey from England, he arrived in Nova Scotia in November 1785.

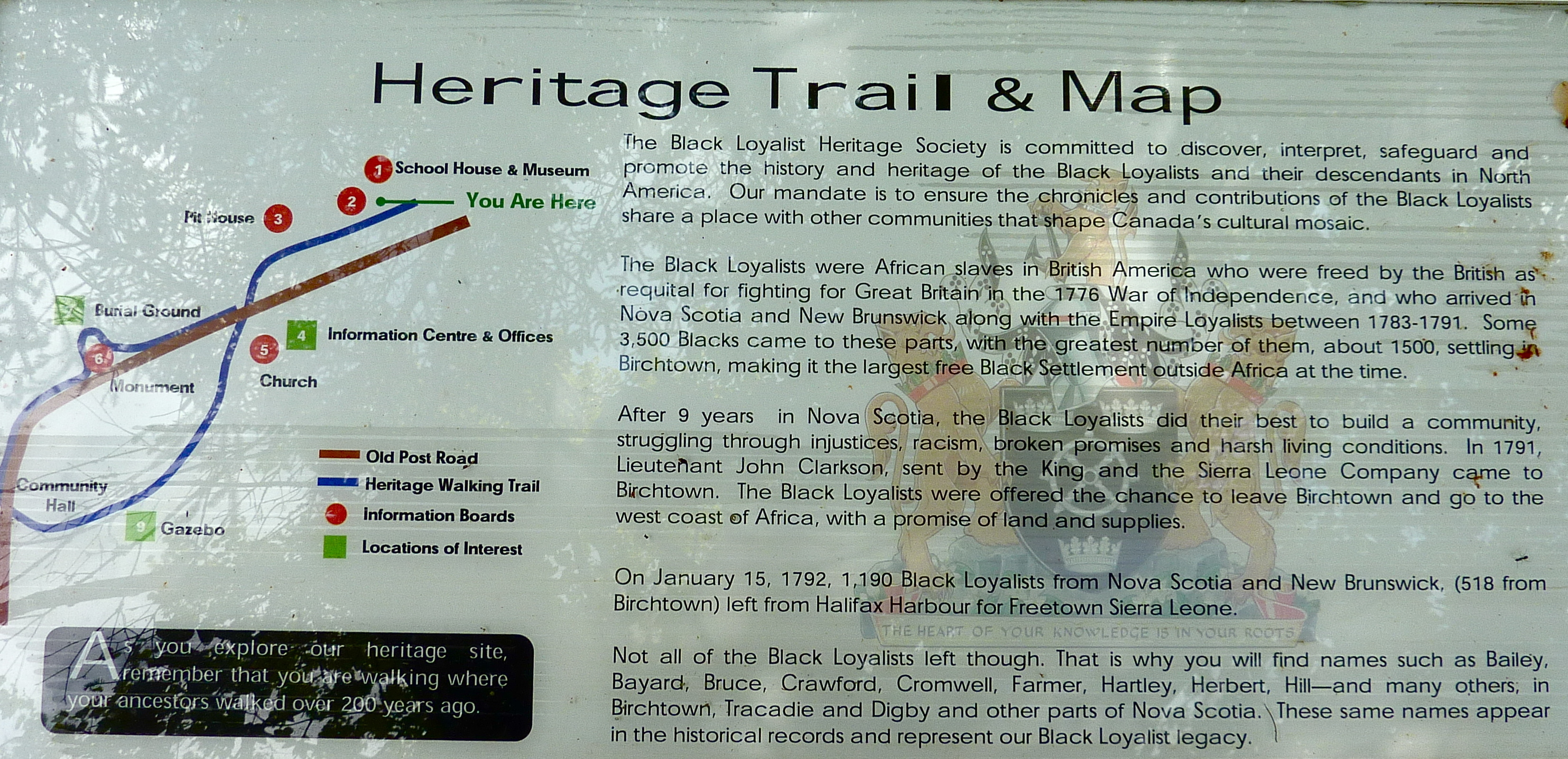
Birchtown, Nova Scotia, Heritage Trail

He lived at Birchtown, Nova Scotia, the largest new black community, where he founded a Huntingdonian church. (Note: Many of the blacks from Birchtown later emigrated to the new colony of Sierra Leone.) Marrant served the black people in the Birchtown area and developed a strong Christian community there. He travelled throughout Nova Scotia to other towns where Black Loyalists settled, such as Jordan River and Cape Negro. He also spoke to white congregations and First Nation people, the Miꞌkmaqs. When he delivered sermons, he used specific Bible verses to infer that he was a prophet sent to Nova Scotia to help raise up the Black Loyalists that listen to him. Further, he said that those who did not listen to him would perish. These kinds of messages were threatening to white residents. Speaking to the hardships that blacks endured, he said that lessons from God where often hidden: "God often hides the sensible signs of his favor from his dearest friends… real Christians, whilst they are among fiery serpents are awaiting with desire, and holy expectations, for the good of the promise."

He had difficulty among other churches, particularly other Methodist churches. White ministers were especially upset when members of their congregations attended Marrant's services. He inspired the creation of Christian faith among black communities, including religious leaders Boston King, John Ball, and Moses Wilkinson, who were Methodists. Another was David George, a Baptist.

He did not receive the monies he expected from the Countess for his missionary work in Nova Scotia and suffered a six-month bout of smallpox. In 1787, Marrant traveled to Boston, Massachusetts. The next year, he became the chaplain of the African Lodge, No. 1, the first lodge of Prince Hall Freemasonry, in Boston, a group active in the movement to abolish slavery in the United States. This was one of the first American organizations to have the name "African" in its title, representing the emerging identity of people of African descent in the United States after the Revolution. In a speech at the Lodge, published in 1789, Marrant described the black people as "an essentially distinct nation within a Christian universalist family of mankind."

In 1785, with the help of Rev. William Aldridge, he published A Narrative of the Lord's Wonderful Dealings with John Marrant, A Black, with the assistance of William Aldridge, who transcribed it. (Note: This memoir proved to be very popular, going to at least 21 editions. Marrant did not receive much financial benefit from it, as not all of the printings were authorised. There were alterations to these later printings that focused on living with the Cherokee and the Christian conversion, without reference to his race or colour.) The narrative told of his time living with Cherokee people, and became one of the most popular stories of that kind. It also told of his conversion to Christianity and his observances of the condition and experiences of blacks in the Colonial period.

His struggle as a black Christian in an irreligious, white, slave-owning world that made little distinction between slaves and freeborn blacks was intended to inspire not just people of his own colour but his white readers as well.

— James W. St. G. Walker

Critics have noted that the narrative has a very different tone to his later publications. Scholar Henry Louis Gates Jr. has argued in The Signifying Monkey that many early African-American narratives were transcribed by white editors, who sometimes influenced the style of such narratives.

Marrant delivered a sermon A Sermon Preached on the 24th Day of June 1789...at the Request of the Right Worshipful the Grand Master Prince Hall, and the Rest of the Brethren of the African Lodge of the Honorable Society of Free and Accepted Masons in Boston in 1789 noting the equality of men before God; it was published. His final published work was a 1790 journal, A Journal of the Rev. John Marrant, from August the 18th, 1785, to the 16th of March, 1790.

== Personal life ==
He married Elizabeth Herries, whose parents were Black Loyalists, on August 15, 1788, at Birchtown, Nova Scotia (Note: Her last name may have been Harries.) and returned with her to Boston. In a letter to Marrant, Margaret Blucke (wife of Stephen Blucke), asked about Marrant's children. He may have been previously married or adopted children. A boy was known to travel with him. That child's name is not mentioned in the Journal, but he may have been Anthony Elliot from Birchtown, who was an assistant.

Marrant traveled to London in 1789 or 1790, where the journal of the previous five years was published. He preached in chapels in London, including the Whitechapel area. (Note: He was thought to have preached at a Huntingdonian chapel in London, but the church was not a Huntingdonian chapel.) He died on April 15, 1791, in Islington and was buried at the chapel graveyard on Church Street.

== Legacy ==
Marrant did not live a long life, but he influenced black people in the United States and Canada, including the Black Loyalists who settled in Sierra Leone in Africa in 1792. He inspired future generations through his narrative. He shared a message of perseverance and faith. Marrant did not live a long life, but he influenced Black communities in the United States and Canada, including the Black Loyalists who settled in Sierra Leone in Africa in 1792. He inspired future generations through his narrative, which was among the earliest spiritual autobiographies by a person of African descent in North America. His Narrative of the Lord’s Wonderful Dealings with John Marrant, A Black offered a powerful testimony of faith, survival, and identity, blending evangelical Christianity with personal experiences of racial oppression and resilience.[1] Marrant's ministry helped lay the foundation for a distinctly Black Christian tradition that emphasized liberation, community solidarity, and spiritual empowerment. As one of the first Black preachers to speak publicly to both Black and white audiences, he broke racial barriers in religious life. His life and work also helped to foster a transatlantic sense of Black identity and purpose, connecting the struggles of African-descended people across the Americas and Africa. Though he died young, Marrant's voice continued to echo through the abolitionist movement and the rise of African American literature and religious thought.
