= Harry Baldwin (footballer) =

English footballer

Personal information
- Date of birth: 17 July 1920
- Place of birth: Birmingham, England
- Date of death: 28 October 2010 (aged 90)
- Place of death: Northampton, England
- Height: 5 ft 9 in (1.75 m)
- Position: Goalkeeper

Senior career*
Years	Team	Apps	(Gls)
19??–1936	Sutton Coldfield Town		
1936–1939	West Bromwich Albion	5	(0)
1939–1952	Brighton & Hove Albion	164	(0)
1952–1953	Kettering Town		
1953–1955	Walsall	37	(0)
1955–1956	Wellington Town		
- * Club domestic league appearances and goals

Harry Baldwin (17 July 1920 – 28 October 2010) was an English professional footballer who made more than 200 Football League appearances playing as a goalkeeper for West Bromwich Albion, Brighton & Hove Albion and Walsall.

== Life and career ==
Baldwin was born in Saltley, Birmingham. He joined West Bromwich Albion from Sutton Town as a 15-year-old amateur in 1936, and made his first-team debut at 17 in 1938 in a 4–3 win in the First Division against local rivals Birmingham. He kept his place for the remaining four matches of the season, but was unable to help West Brom retain their top-flight status. He turned professional, but broke his collarbone, never regained his place, and was released at the end of the season. He moved on to Brighton & Hove Albion, but played just one league match before competitive football was abandoned for the duration of the Second World War.

He served in the Royal Navy during the war but was medically discharged. After recovering, he made guest appearances in the wartime competitions for clubs including Nottingham Forest and Northampton Town, and then returned to Brighton & Hove Albion. For the next seven seasons, Baldwin shared the goalkeeper position with Jack Ball, and took his appearance total to 183 in first-team competitions. Despite his lack of height – he stood 5 ft 9 in (1.75 m) – he was particularly adept at saving penalties: in the 1947–48 season he saved seven penalties out of nine faced, including five in succession.

Baldwin moved on in 1952 to an engineering job in Northampton, continuing his football career with Kettering Town of the Southern League, but returned to the Football League in 1953 with Walsall. After 18 months and 37 appearances, he moved to Wellington Town where injury ended his career. He returned to engineering, and ran machine-tool companies in the Midlands.

Baldwin died in Northampton in 2010 at the age of 90.
