= Johan Bull (disambiguation) =

Johan Bull (1893–1945) was a Norwegian-born American painter.

Johan Bull may also refer to:

- Henrik Johan Bull (1844–1930), Norwegian businessman and whaler
- Johan Lausen Bull (1751–1817), Norwegian jurist, politician and land owner
- Johan Peter Bull (1883–1960), Norwegian theatre worker
- Johan Randulf Bull (1749–1829), Norwegian judge

== See also ==
- John Bull (disambiguation)
