= David Dahl (baseball) =

American baseball player (born 1994)

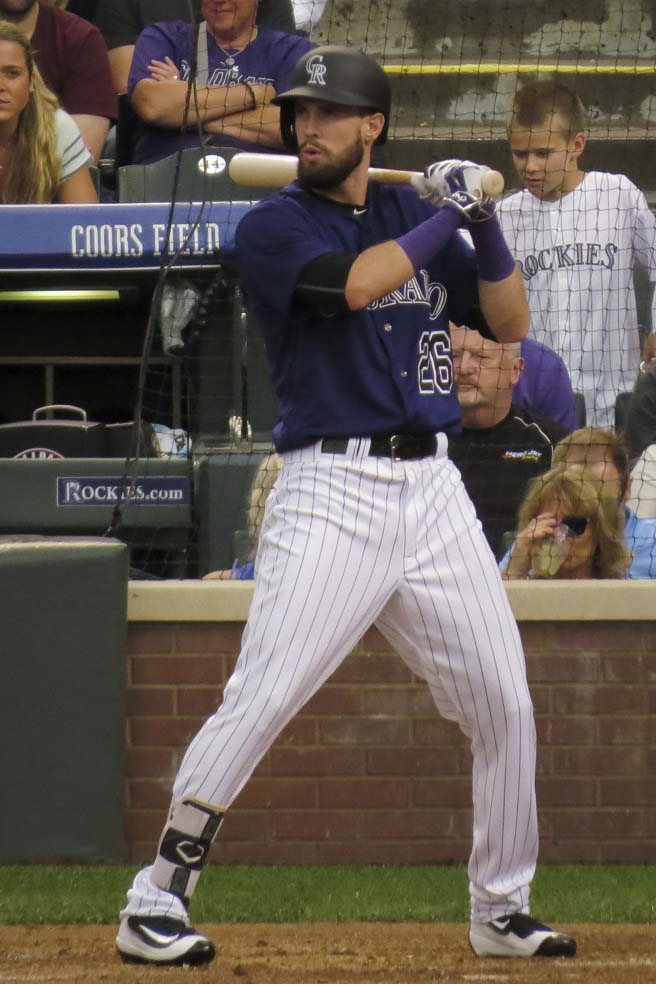
- Dahl with the Colorado Rockies in 2016
- Outfielder
- Born: April 1, 1994 (age 31); Birmingham, Alabama, U.S.
- Batted: Left Threw: Right

MLB debut
- July 25, 2016, for the Colorado Rockies

Last MLB appearance
- July 6, 2024, for the Philadelphia Phillies

MLB statistics
- Batting average: .268
- Home runs: 46
- Runs batted in: 169
- Stats at Baseball Reference

Teams
- Colorado Rockies (2016, 2018–2020); Texas Rangers (2021); San Diego Padres (2023); Philadelphia Phillies (2024)

Career highlights and awards
- All-Star (2019)

David Martin Dahl (born April 1, 1994) is an American former professional baseball outfielder. He played in Major League Baseball (MLB) for the Colorado Rockies, Texas Rangers, San Diego Padres, and Philadelphia Phillies. Dahl was selected by the Rockies in the first round of the 2012 MLB draft out of Oak Mountain High School in Birmingham, Alabama. Dahl made his MLB debut with the Rockies in 2016, and was an All-Star in 2019.

== Amateur career ==
Dahl attended Oak Mountain High School in Birmingham, Alabama. As a freshman, he made the school's varsity baseball team as a shortstop. In 2011, Dahl was selected to play for the United States 18-and-under national baseball team, and appeared in the 2011 Pan American Games. Dahl recorded 11 runs batted in (RBIs) during the 15 games of the tournament, in which the United States won the gold medal.

In 2012, his senior season at Oak Mountain, Dahl had a .412 batting average, 34 RBIs, and 18 stolen bases as an outfielder. He committed to attend Auburn University on a scholarship to play college baseball for the Auburn Tigers.

== Professional career ==
=== Colorado Rockies ===
The Colorado Rockies selected Dahl in the first round, with the tenth overall selection, of the 2012 MLB draft. Dahl signed with the Rockies, receiving a $2.6 million signing bonus, rather than follow through on his commitment to attend Auburn University. He made his professional debut for the Grand Junction Rockies of the Rookie-level Pioneer League, hitting .379/.423/.625 with nine home runs and 57 RBIs. He was named the Pioneer League's most valuable player.

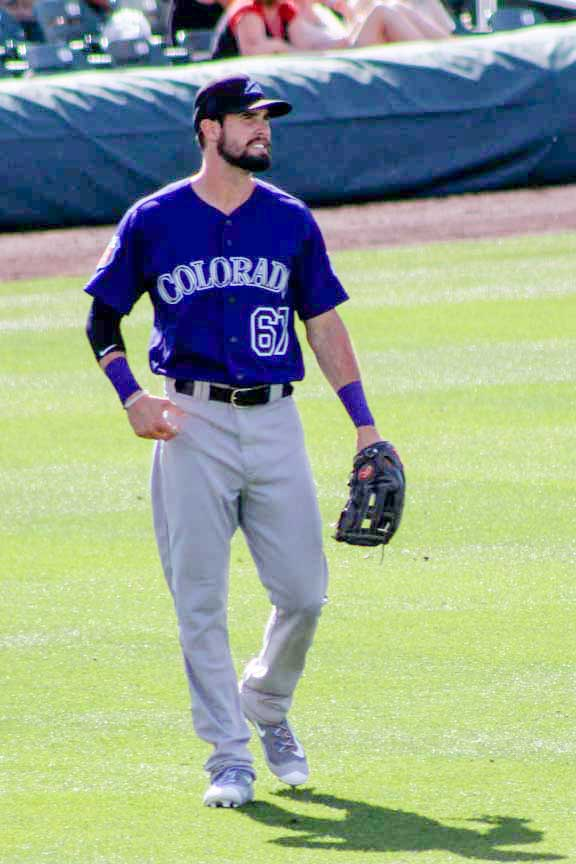
Dahl during 2016 Colorado Rockies spring training

Prior to the 2013 season, Dahl was ranked as the Rockies second best prospect by Baseball America. He was also ranked as the 58th best prospect in baseball by MLB.com. The Rockies suspended Dahl at the beginning of the season, reportedly because he missed a team flight, and played in ten games for the Asheville Tourists of the Single–A South Atlantic League, missing the remainder of the season due to a torn hamstring. Dahl began the 2014 season with Asheville, and was promoted to the Modesto Nuts of the High–A California League in July. Between Asheville and Modesto, Dahl batted .299, hit 14 home runs, and stole 21 bases for the season.

On May 28, 2015, while playing for the New Britain Rock Cats of the Double–A Eastern League, Dahl collided with a teammate during a game while chasing a fly ball, and suffered a spleen laceration. After surgery to repair the damage, Dahl opted to have his spleen removed, rather than waiting for it to heal, in order to return to baseball with less recovery time. Allowing it to heal would have cost Dahl the remainder of the season, while removing it left him with a recovery time of four to six weeks. He resumed playing baseball in July, with a six-game rehabilitation stint with the Boise Hawks of the Low–A Northwest League, before returning to New Britain. Dahl finished the season with a .278 batting average, six home runs, and 22 stolen bases.

The Rockies invited Dahl to spring training as a non-roster player in 2016. Dahl began the 2016 season with the Hartford Yard Goats of the Eastern League. After he batted .278 with 13 home runs, 45 RBIs, and 16 stolen bases for Hartford, the Rockies promoted Dahl to the Albuquerque Isotopes of the Triple–A Pacific Coast League. Dahl appeared in the All-Star Futures Game as an injury replacement for Austin Meadows. After batting .484 in 16 games for Albuquerque, the Rockies promoted Dahl to MLB on July 25, 2016, and he made his MLB debut that night as the Rockies' starting left fielder. Dahl recorded his first MLB hit off the Baltimore Orioles' Yovani Gallardo during his debut. On August 11, 2016, Dahl pushed a career-opening hitting streak to 17 games, tying the MLB record set by Chuck Aleno in 1941. The hitting streak ended at 17 games.

During spring training in 2017, Dahl had a stress fracture in a rib, making it painful to swing the bat. After developing back spasms while rehabilitating in July, the Rockies shut Dahl down for the season.

In 2019, Dahl played 100 games, hitting .302 with 15 home runs and 61 RBI. He was named to the National League All-Star roster and recorded a single in the All-Star Game. Dahl's 2020 season saw his offensive production regress as he also battled with injury. In 99 plate appearances, Dahl hit .183 with eight RBIs. On December 2, Dahl was nontendered by the Rockies.

=== Texas Rangers ===
On December 15, 2020, the Texas Rangers signed Dahl to a one year, $2.7 million contract for the 2021 season. In 205 at-bats for the Rangers, Dahl hit .210 with four home runs and 18 RBIs. On August 2, 2021, Dahl was designated for assignment by the Rangers. On August 6, Dahl was released by the Rangers.

=== Milwaukee Brewers ===
On August 17, 2021, Dahl signed a minor league contract with the Milwaukee Brewers. He played for the Nashville Sounds before he was released on July 12, 2022.

=== Washington Nationals ===
On July 22, 2022, Dahl signed a minor league contract with the Washington Nationals organization. On August 15, 2022, Dahl opted out of his minor league contract, making him a free agent.

=== San Diego Padres ===
On December 6, 2022, Dahl signed a minor league deal with the San Diego Padres. He had his contract selected on March 30, 2023. In 9 games for San Diego, Dahl went 1-for-9 (.111) with his only hit being a solo home run. In 17 games for the Triple–A El Paso Chihuahuas, he hit .265 with one home run and ten RBI. On June 6, Dahl was designated for assignment. Dahl elected free agency in lieu of an outright assignment on June 9.

=== Los Angeles Dodgers ===
On June 20, 2023, Dahl signed a minor league contract with the Los Angeles Dodgers organization. He played in 54 games for the Triple-A Oklahoma City Dodgers, hitting .282 with eight homers and 39 RBI. Dahl elected free agency following the season on November 6.

=== Philadelphia Phillies ===
On February 17, 2024, Dahl signed a minor league contract with the Philadelphia Phillies. While playing for the Triple–A Lehigh Valley IronPigs, Dahl hit for the cycle as part of a 4–3 victory over the Norfolk Tides, becoming the third player to do so in franchise history (Maikel Franco and Michael Taylor). In 43 games for Lehigh, he batted .340/.416/.660 with 12 home runs and 26 RBI. On June 3, the Phillies selected Dahl's contract, adding him to their active roster. In 19 games for the Phillies, Dahl went 12–for–58 (.207) with three home runs and eight RBI. He was designated for assignment by Philadelphia on July 9. On July 10, Dahl cleared waivers and elected free agency in lieu of an outright assignment. He was re-signed to a minor league contract on July 22. Dahl elected free agency following the season on November 4.

On December 10, 2025, after a year of inactivity, Dahl announced his retirement from professional baseball on his personal Instagram account.

== Coaching career ==
On February 5, 2026, Dahl was hired by the Los Angeles Dodgers as an assistant hitting coach and outfield coach for their Triple-A affiliate, the Oklahoma City Comets.

== Personal life ==
Dahl lives with his wife, Jacquelyn Dahl. She is the founder of 1UP Sports Marketing, where she represents high-profile athletes such as Patrick Mahomes, Julian Edelman, and Danny Amendola.

== See also ==
- List of Major League Baseball hit records
