= SizeChina =

Anthropometric research project in Hong Kong

SizeChina is a 3D anthropometric research project at the School of Design at the Hong Kong Polytechnic University. It is also referred to as SizeChina.com.

The purpose of the research project is to "create the first-ever digital database of Chinese head and face shapes". It was created in response to the lack of information about Chinese head sizes and shapes, and the fact that most products designed for the head or face are based on Western face shapes. It contains over 1.3 billion faces.

The results from the SizeChina project are invaluable to industries such as medical, optical, entertainment and sports, all those concerned with headgear such as sunglasses, helmets, sanitary face masks, etc. As this database, and the models created from it, provides information on Chinese features, the market will start creating the first China fit products. The first product designed using the SizeChina data, a military/police goggle, has been commercialized.

The database is compiled of data from digital scanning equipment based on people from six different regions in the People's Republic of China; Guangzhou, Hangzhou, Lanzhou, Chongqing, Beijing, and Shenyang. The Director of this project is Dr.Roger Ball, an accomplished Industrial Designer and Design Professor. He won the 2009 Presidents Award for Research at The Hong Kong Polytechnic University

== Awards ==
SizeChina won four major international design awards in 2008: IDEA/BusinessWeek Gold Medal - Research Category, IDEA/BusinessWeek - Best in Show (co-winner with Apple iPhone), Fortune Magazine(China)- China's Most Successful Design Award, Design For Asia Award - Grand Prize. In 2009 SizeChina won the Red Dot Design Award and was a Finalist for the Index: Award - Design to Improve Life. SizeChina data products were commercialized starting in October 2008 by Hong Kong-based www.certiform.org.
