= Kevin Garver =

American football coach (born 1987)

UAB Blazers
- Title: Pass game coordinator & wide receivers coach

Personal information
- Born: July 28, 1987 (age 39); Tuscaloosa, Alabama, U.S.

Career information
- High school: Oak Mountain (AL)
- College: Alabama

Career history
- Alabama (2007–2012); Student assistant (2007–2009); Graduate assistant (2010–2011); Offensive analyst (2012); Arizona Cardinals (2013–2018); Offensive quality control (2013–2015); Offensive assistant (2016); Offensive wide receivers coach (2017); Wide receivers coach (2018); Tampa Bay Buccaneers (2019–2022) Wide receivers coach; UAB (2024–present); Senior offensive analyst (2024); Pass game coordinator & wide receivers coach (2025–present)

Awards and highlights
- Super Bowl champion (LV); 3× National champion (2009, 2011, 2012)

Kevin Garver (born July 28, 1987) is an American college and professional football coach who is the wide receivers coach and pass game coordinator for the UAB Blazers. He was the wide receivers coach for the Arizona Cardinals and Tampa Bay Buccaneers of the National Football League (NFL). He also coached at Alabama, where he was a member of three national championship winning teams as a support staff member.

== Coaching career ==
=== Alabama ===
Garver began his coaching career at Alabama as a student assistant in 2007 working under Nick Saban. He was promoted to a graduate assistant in 2010 and to offensive analyst in 2012. He would end up winning three National Championships while with Alabama.

=== Arizona Cardinals ===
Looking for an entry-level job with Bruce Arians and the Arizona Cardinals, Garver got a foot in the door when he met Arians thanks to Tom Moore, whom he met as working as his guide in Tuscaloosa when he was a low-level staffer at Alabama. Garver was hired as an offensive quality control coach with the Cardinals in 2013, working with the wide receivers. While in Arizona, he developed a close relationship with Cardinals star Larry Fitzgerald and was praised by Fitzgerald for his maturity at a young age, intelligence, and football knowledge. He also had an interview request with the Seattle Seahawks blocked in order to keep him with the Cardinals with the hopes of keeping Fitzgerald in Arizona. He was promoted to wide receivers coach in 2018 under first-year head coach Steve Wilks.

=== Tampa Bay Buccaneers ===
Garver was hired as the wide receivers coach for the Tampa Bay Buccaneers in 2019. He was named to The Athletic's rising NFL stars under the age of 40 in 2020. He won his first Super Bowl as a coach when the Buccaneers defeated the Kansas City Chiefs in Super Bowl LV.

On January 19, 2023, Garver was fired by the Buccaneers.
