= Oak Mountain High School =

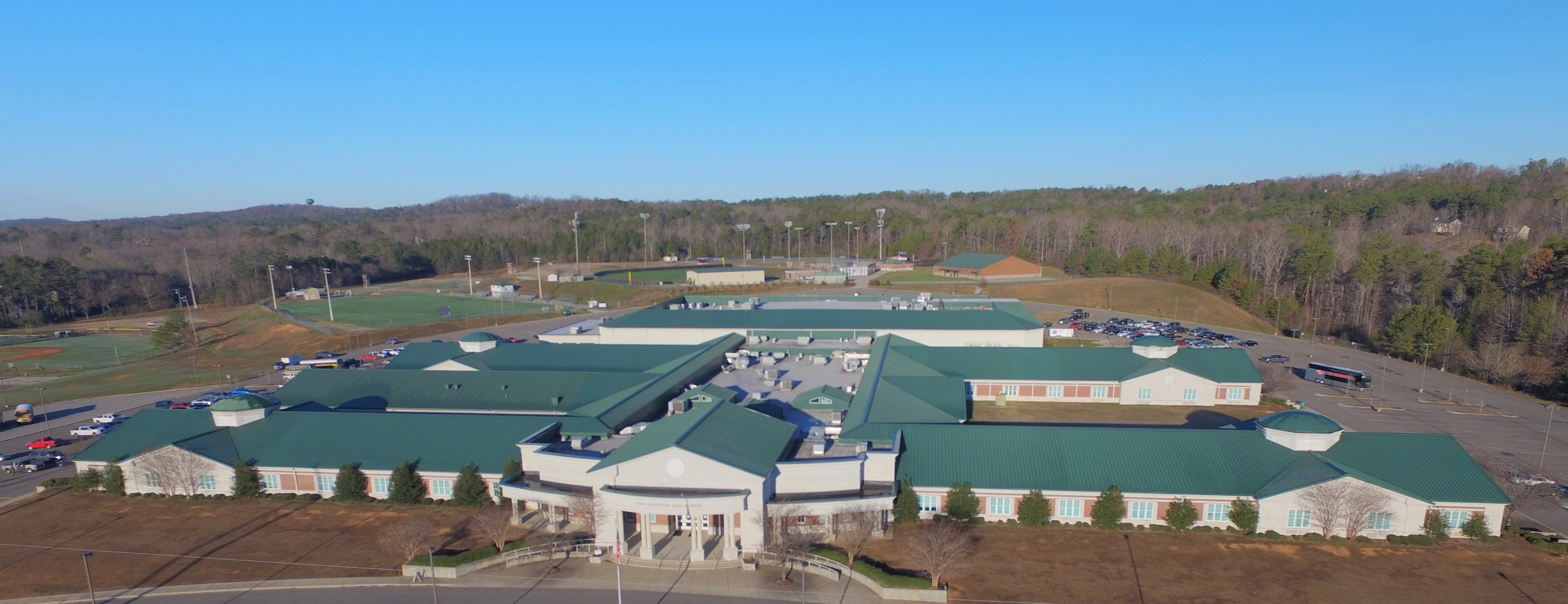
- Oak Mountain High School January 2017

Location
- 5476 Caldwell Mill Road; Birmingham, Alabama 35242; United States; 33°22′0″N 86°44′5″W

Information
- Type: Public
- Motto: Empowering each student for excellence
- Established: 1999 (27 years ago)
- School district: Shelby County Board of Education
- CEEB code: 010408
- Principal: Andrew Gunn
- Teaching staff: 87.80 (FTE)
- Grades: 9–12
- Enrollment: 1,652 (2023-2024)
- Student to teacher ratio: 18.82
- Campus type: Suburban
- Colors: Red, white, and blue
- Athletics: AHSAA Class 7A
- Nickname: Eagles
- Feeder schools: Oak Mountain Middle School
- Website: www.shelbyed.k12.al.us/o/omhs

Oak Mountain High School is a four-year public high school in the northern Shelby County suburbs of Birmingham, Alabama. It is part of Shelby County School Schools.

== Academics ==
=== College preparation ===
Oak Mountain students can take one or more of the following Advanced Placement courses:

- Biology
- Calculus
- Chemistry
- Computer Science
- English Language & Composition
- English Literature & Composition
- Environmental Science
- European History
- Latin
- Macroeconomics
- Physics
- Research
- Seminar
- Spanish
- Studio Art
- US Government & Politics
- US History
- World History

Oak Mountain students are also eligible for dual enrollment at Jefferson State Community College and Auburn University, allowing them to earn high school and college credit simultaneously.

== Athletics ==
Oak Mountain competes in AHSAA Class 7A athletics and fields teams in the following sports:

- Baseball
- Basketball
- Bowling
- Cheerleading
- Cross Country
- Flag Football
- Football
- Golf
- Outdoor Track & Field
- Soccer
- Softball
- Swimming & Diving
- Tennis
- Volleyball
- Wrestling

Oak Mountain's soccer programs have been two of the best programs in the country during the last twenty years. The boys' soccer team won four 6A state championships, in 2005, 2007, 2008, and 2011, as well as three consecutive 7A championships from 2015 to 2017. In addition to these state championships, the Eagles were voted as national champions in 2005 and 2016. The girls' soccer program has been very successful, as well, winning AHSAA Class 6A titles in 2012 and 2014, and Class 7A championships in 2015 and 2021, being named national champions by MaxPreps in 2014.

On the hardwood, the Eagles have found recent success, advancing to their first-ever state semifinal berth in 2020, where the Eagles lost to eventual champion R. E. Lee-Montgomery. In 2021, the Eagles once again advanced to the AHSAA Final Four, this time finding success in the two games, winning the team's first AHSAA state championship, at any classification, after defeating the Enterprise Wildcats 41–37.

== Notable alumni ==
- Kevin Garver ('06), American football coach
- Katie Crutchfield ('07), Musician
- Merritt Mathias ('07), professional soccer player
- Chandler Hoffman ('08), professional soccer player
- John Ball ('08), Christian musician
- David Dahl ('12), MLB player
- Toni Payne ('13), professional soccer player for the Nigeria women's national football team and Women's Super League club Everton
  - Appeared in the 2023 FIFA Women's World Cup as a starter for the Super Falcons. Helped her team progress out of the group stage before being eliminated in the Round of 16 by England in a penalty shootout.
- Armond Lloyd ('16), multi-sport athlete, former 2x All-Conference Samford defensive lineman, XFL player, Alabama State Games wrestling champion, and WWE talent (2022)
- Nealy Martin ('16), professional soccer player
- Callie Walker ('15), Miss Alabama 2018 (Top 10 at Miss America)
