= William Aldridge =

English nonconformist minister (1737–1797)

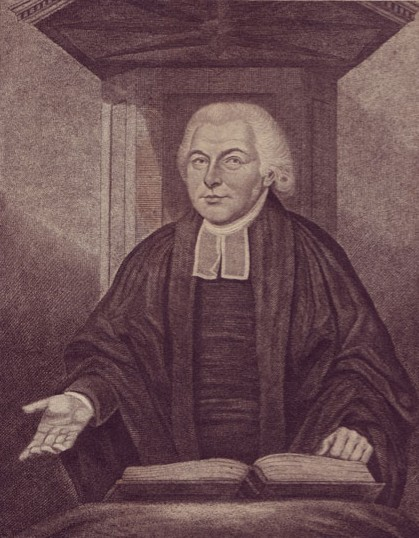
William Aldridge, 1791 engraving

William Aldridge (1737 – 28 February 1797) was an English nonconformist minister.

== Biography ==
Aldridge was born at Warminster, in Wiltshire. At age 23 he decided to become a preacher of the gospel, and was admitted to Trevecca College in South Wales. There he completed a theological course. He received a license, and for a number of years preached in the chapels of the Countess of Huntingdon's Connexion.

In September 1771 Aldridge was sent by Lady Huntingdon, with Joseph Cook, another Trevecca student, to Margate, in the Isle of Thanet. They began by preaching in the open air. The numbers increased from month to month. About this time occurred in Dover a schism among the Wesleyan Methodists, and Aldridge and Cook were invited there. Aldridge preached for the first time in the market-place on a Sunday, meeting hostility. But Aldridge went to Dover to live in a former Presbyterian meeting-house, and held services. Later, the two preachers supplied Margate and Dover alternately.

The Countess then appointed Aldridge as "supply" to the Mulberry Garden chapel in Wapping. The congregation petitioned her to make him a permanent minister; after her refusal, Aldridge left the Connexion, in 1776.

Aldridge was called to the vacant Jewry Street Chapel (Calvinistic Methodist) in London. He remained there as minister, for over 20 years. He had Richard Povah there as assistant, in his last years.

== Death ==
Aldridge died on 28 February 1797, and was buried in Bunhill Fields. At Bunhill Fields the sermon was given by George Gould. The following Sunday, Anthony Crole and Thomas Bryson, both fellow Trevecca students, preached sermons for Aldridge at the Jewry Street Chapel.

== Works ==
Aldridge wrote:

- Doctrine of the Trinity, Stated, Proved, and Defended
- A funeral sermon on the death of the Countess of Huntingdon.

He also edited (1776) A New Collection of Hymns, Particularly Designed for the Use of the Congregation at the Chapel, in Jewry-Street, Aldgate, London.

=== A narrative of the Lord's wonderful dealings with J. Marrant, a black ===
Aldridge also edited John Marrant's account of his life, A narrative of the Lord's wonderful dealings with J. Marrant, a black. The circumstances were that Marrant was ordained in the Huntingdon Connexion in 1785, and related his experiences to Aldridge. More content was added later, in the 4th edition, and Elrod assumes that its source is the ordination sermon given by Marrant to the Countess of Huntingdon.

The work is an Indian captivity narrative, and it has been suggested that Aldridge's role accounts for the lack of discussion in the work of the issue of race, given that Marrant was an African American. Aldridge objected to later editions of the book (4th edition onwards). Henry Louis Gates Jr. comments that the work, first published in 1785, is inaccurately described as a slave narrative. It had seen 20 editions by 1835.
