= Golden Globe (disambiguation) =

A Golden Globe Award is an award presented to recognize excellence in film and television, presented by the Hollywood Foreign Press Association until 2023. The awards are now administered by Dick Clark Productions.

Golden Globe can also mean:

- Golden Globe Foundation, the charitable organization successor to the Hollywood Foreign Press Association's charitable arm
- Golden Globes (Portugal), an award presented by SIC-TV in Portugal to recognize excellence in art and entertainment in that country
- Globo d'oro, an Italian annual film award
- Sunday Times Golden Globe Race, a non-stop, single-handed, round-the-world yacht race, held in 1968–1969
- 2018 Golden Globe Race, a series of round-the-world yacht races held as a revival of the Sunday Times Race
- The Golden Globe, a 1988 science fiction novel by John Varley
- Star Wars: Junior Jedi Knights: The Golden Globe, a 1995 Star Wars novel

== See also ==
- List of Golden Globe winners, winners of the HFPA awards
- Golden Ball (disambiguation)
- Golden (disambiguation)
- Globe (disambiguation)
