= Alan Ball =

Alan Ball may refer to:

- Alan Ball (screenwriter) (born 1957), American screenwriter and director
- Alan Ball Sr. (1924–1982), English footballer and manager
- Alan Ball Jr. (1945–2007), English footballer and manager, winner of the 1966 FIFA World Cup
- Alan Ball (American football) (born 1985), American football player
- Alan Ball (weightlifter) (born 1943), American Olympic weightlifter

== See also ==
- Allan Ball (1943–2018), English footballer with Queen of the South
