= David Ball =

David or Dave Ball may refer to:

== Music ==
- Dave Ball (guitarist) (1950–2015), guitarist formerly of Procol Harum, Bedlam, Long John Baldry, etc.
- David Ball (country singer) (born 1953), American country singer
  - David Ball (album), a 1994 album by this artist
- David Ball (electronic musician) (1959–2025), English electronic musician (usually known as Dave), member of Soft Cell, The Grid
- Dave "Taif" Ball, British bass guitarist with metal bands Killing Joke and Voodoocult

== Sports ==
- Dave Ball (defensive end) (born 1981), American football player
- David Ball (wide receiver) (born 1984), American football player
- David Ball (footballer) (born 1989), English footballer
- David Ball (sport shooter), British sport shooter

== Other ==
- David Ball (bishop) (1926–2017), Episcopal bishop of Albany, NY
- David W. Ball (born 1949), American novelist
- Dave Ball, Survivor: Samoa competitor
