= Eliphalet Ball =

Eliphalet Ball (July 29, 1722 – April 6, 1797) was a Presbyterian minister and an early settler in Saratoga County, New York. The town of Ballston ("Ball's Town") is named for him.

== Personal ==
Ball was born on July 29, 1722, in New Haven, Connecticut, the son of John Ball, Jr. and Mary Tuttle. It has been said that through his father he was a third cousin of George Washington, but one biography states: "There is no known connection between this family and that of Mary Ball, the mother of President Washington." He studied Theology at Yale College in New Haven, where he graduated in 1748 and was "probably" licensed to preach.

In 1750 he married Elizabeth van Flamen (or Fleming) of New York City. The couple had four sons, three of whom survived to adulthood: Cornelius (1750–1771), who died young, John (1756–1838), Stephen (born c.1759, and Flamen (1761–1816). They had two daughters, Mary (1753–1803), who married General James Gordon, and Elizabeth (1769–1784), who died at age 15. After the death of his wife, Elizabeth, Ball married Ruth Beecher of Amity, New York, in 1783; the couple had no children.

== Career ==
In 1754 he was chosen minister of the Presbyterian Church in Bedford, New York, in Westchester County. He was a sympathizer of the "New-Light" movement of Henry Alline, part of the First Great Awakening, which rejected the power structure and ceremonials of the established church. They rejected the idea of predestination, and taught that all people have free will and therefore can be reborn into a personal relationship with God. This brought him into conflict with his more conservative congregation. Among other charges they accused him of "imprudent levity and unguarded airiness of deportment." He requested and was granted a "dismission" on December 21, 1768.

In 1769 he went to Saratoga County, which was just being settled, in 1770. He was granted 400 acres (160 ha) (or 500 acres (200 ha)) of land for agreeing to serve as minister. A church was established in the hamlet of Ballston Center on September 22, 1775. Ball was not the first settler in the area. The McDonald brothers, Michael and Nicholas, had settled on the west shore of Ballston Lake in 1763. According to legend, Rev. Ball bought the rights to name the town from the McDonalds for the price of a jug of rum.

In 1784 Ball resigned as pastor in Ballston. Because of the disruption caused by the American Revolution the pulpit at his former church in Bedford had become vacant, so that year he returned to Westchester and occupied the position until 1790. He returned to Ballston, bringing additional settlers, and died there in 1795. He is buried in the Briggs Cemetery in Ballston.
