= Bawl =

Bawl may refer to:

- Bawl, Irish band from the 1990s, predecessor of Pony Club
- Bawls, energy drink
- Crying (synonym)
