= Roger Ball (designer) =

American industrial designer

Roger Ball is a professor of industrial design at School of Industrial Design, Georgia Tech. He is also a former professor and leader of Master of Design Practices and the Asian Ergonomics Lab at the School of Design, Hong Kong Polytechnic University.

Ball was the co-founder of Paradox Design, a Canadian design firm that created sports products such as helmets, body armor, eyewear, for clients such as Itech Sports, Burton Snowboards, Bell Sports, Brine Lacrosse, Nike, Bauer, Fisher-Price, and Smith Goggles.

Roger Ball received his Master of Fine Arts from Domus Academy and his PhD in Design and Ergonomics from the Delft University of Technology.

== Awards and recognition ==
In 1998 he won the IDEA/BusinessWeek Award Silver Medal – Sports Category for the Skycap Snowboard helmet.In 2008 his SizeChina anthropometric research survey won four major international awards: IDEA/BusinessWeek Gold Medal -Research Category, IDEA/BusinessWeek – Best in Show (co-winner with Apple iPhone), Fortune Magazine(China)- China's Most Successful Design Award{, Design For Asia Award- Grand Prize. In 2009 he won the Red Dot Award and was a finalist for the Index: Award – Design to Improve Life. He won the 2009 Presidents Award for Research from the Hong Kong Polytechnic University.

In 2003 he was the lighting director for Suzanne Somers' 2003 Broadway debut, The Blonde in the Thunderbird, which garnered mostly negative reviews and closed early, with one reviewer commenting, "Roger Ball lights Somers obsessively."

== SizeChina ==
Ball is the Director of the SizeChina research project which created a database of over 2000 Chinese head and face shapes in order to develop the first generation of "China Fit" products for the sports, entertainment, fashion, and medical fields.
