= Baroness de Calabrella =

The "Baroness de Calabrella" (c. 1788 – 6 October 1856, Paris) was an English socialite, journalist, and writer.

== Family ==
Catherine Ball was born in December 1787, the daughter of David and Sarah Ball of Bishop's Hall, Lambourne, Essex. Her grandmother Ruth had, for her second marriage, married Admiral Edward Hughes, who had obtained a large fortune. However, with the deaths of Catherine's uncle Henry Ball (1792), Admiral Hughes (1794), her father (1798) and her grandmother (1800), the money was left to David Ball's children – mostly to the only son, Edward (1798–1863), but substantial sums to Catherine and her sisters Ruth and Sydney. The family may have moved to Admiral Hughes' former residence on Portland Place in London after her father's death. Sometime later her mother remarried, to a man named Thomas Johnson.

Her brother Edward, youngest of the family (ten years her junior), became the famously wealthy dandy and gambler known as "The Golden Ball". Her 1843 book Prism of Imagination is dedicated to "E. H. Ball Hughes, Esq., by his much-attached and affectionate sister, (the Baroness) E. C. De Calabrella".

== Scandals ==
On 9 July 1804, she married Rev. Francis Lee (c. 1768 – 1826), a chaplain to the Prince of Wales. Her mother had previously rejected the marriage, but the couple published banns in a local church and were married, with a servant of Rev. Lee pretending to be her father. Rev. Lee lived nearby in Duke Street, Portland Place, and the couple lived happily at first; a son, Edward Hughes Lee (d. 1834), was born in April 1806. However, Catherine and her husband became estranged, and he spent time in Spain without her. A second child, a son, was born in 1810, which Lee disclaimed. Catherine moved in with her lover, Captain George de Blaquiere (a son of soldier and politician John Blaquiere, 1st Baron de Blaquiere). Blaquiere was successfully sued for criminal conversation by Lee. The son, George William Dixon de Blaquiere was the child of Captain de Blaquiere; Catherine was pregnant by her lover when the trial commenced.

In 1814–5, Lee attempted to obtain a divorce by means of a bill in Parliament; this was apparently opposed by Catherine and never passed, although testimony was taken on the circumstances.

Francis Lee had business and political interests in Lancaster and made an unsuccessful run for parliament there in 1824, in part by claiming that his son Edward Hughes Lee was his uncle Edward Hughes Ball Hughes' heir. After suffering business setbacks he committed suicide in May 1826 while in a state of temporary insanity.

George de Blaquiere died in the same year. Catherine used de Blaquiere's name for a time, but may not have ever married him, as she was not able to do so until her first husband's death. Some time later she may have married Thomas Jenkins, the first patron of the Countess of Blessington; she certainly used his name. Jenkins died in 1837. At some point she acquired property in southern Italy and starting using the title "Baroness de Calabrella". The property belonged previously to her son and his widow was using the title as late as 1838.

== Journalism and writing career ==
By the 1840s, she had purchased a newspaper named the Court Journal, which covered mostly society matters. The paper had been losing money, and it continued to do so under several editors she hired to run it. One of the editors, Jocquim Hayward Stocqueler, wrote of her, "...the baroness was tall and of a rather elegant figure. She must have been decidedly handsome in her youth; care, and a certain sense of dignity, had imparted a severe and melacholy expression to her features; but her manners were gentle and ladylike." He also recounted her friendship with the Countess of Blessington and her mortification when the Court Journal gave one of Blessington's novels a bad review.

She wrote novels and short stories, and published a book on etiquette that went through a number of American editions. Her stories appeared in a number of gift books edited by her friend the Countess of Blessington, and she edited or wrote several such works herself.

== Images and tributes ==
A portrait by Alfred d'Orsay, the Countess of Blessington's partner, exists; along with other portraits, d'Orsay sold prints of it. A print of Calabrella, possibly from when she was younger, was included with her Ladies' Science of Etiquette in 1844; an 1845 American gift book, The American Book of Beauty, included a copy of it and a poem titled "Lines on Seeing a Portrait of the Countess of Calabrella".

== Selected works ==
- Novels: The Tempter and the Tempted (1842), The Cousins (Ainsworth's Magazine, 1843), The Land of Promise, a Tale (1844), The Double Oath; or, The Rendezvous (1850)
- Edited: The Court Journal Library (1846), Evenings at Haddon Hall (1849) (illustrated by George Cattermole)
- Stories: The Prism of Thought (1843 collection), The Prism of Imagination (1843 collection); stories in the Countess of Blessington's "Keepsake" books for 1842–6, 1850; also in Blessington's Book of Beauty (1843, 1847); and in Ainsworth's Magazine (2 in 1843) and The Illustrated London News (1844). A long anonymous story titled "The Old Man of Haarlem", from an English publication called Magic and Mesmerism: An Episode of the Eighteenth Century and Other Tales, Volume III (London, Saunders and Otley, 1843) was published as a book in the United States under the name of "the Countess de Calabrella".
- Non-fiction: The Ladies' Science of Etiquette (1844) This was published at the same time as a similar work by d'Orsay, and went through a number of editions, including an 1860 edition that combined the works.
