= Balls (mountain range) =

Mountain range in the Sierra Nevada in California

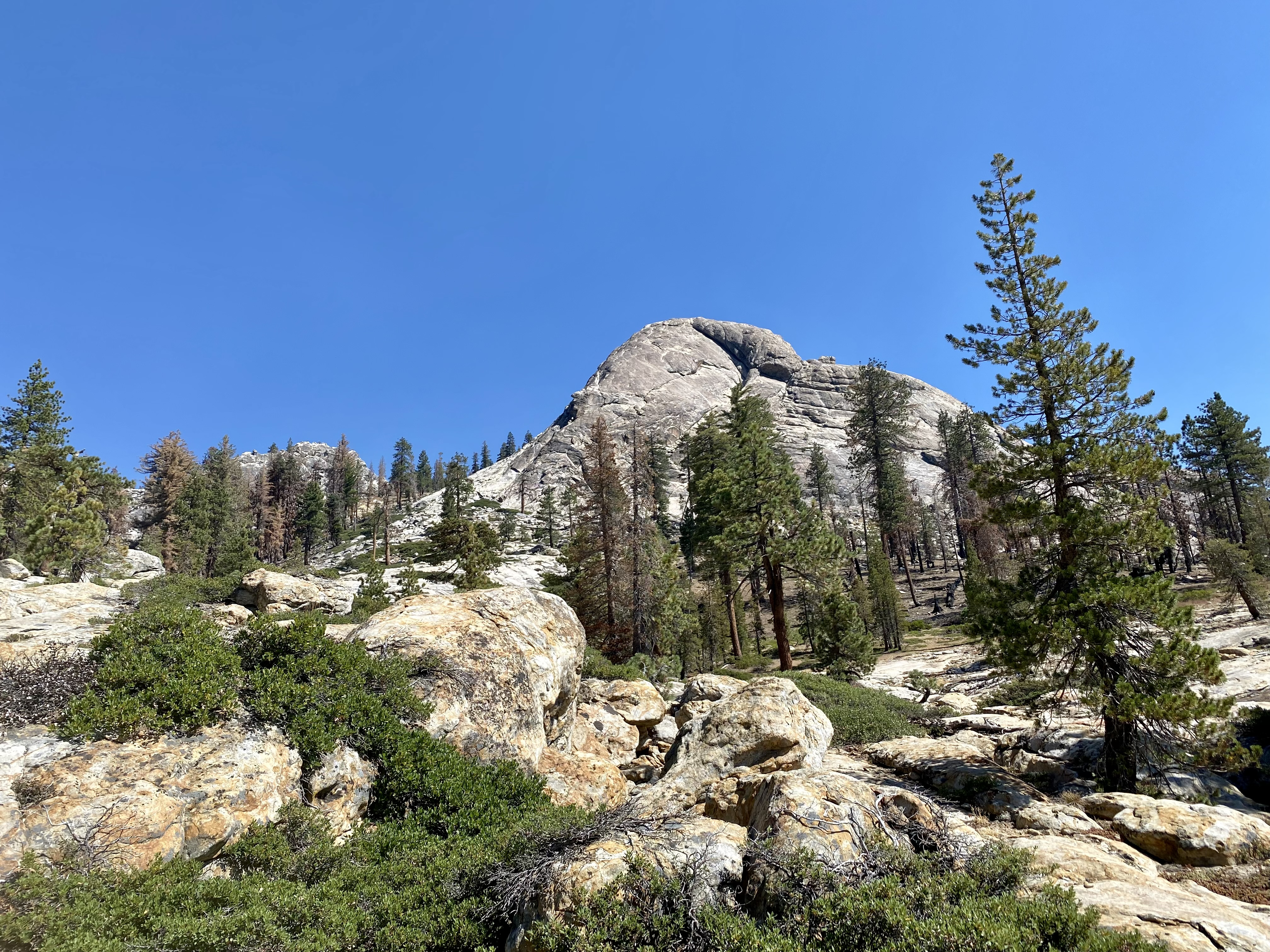
- Looking north from the Portuguese Overlook Observation Site, toward the Balls.

Highest point
- Elevation: 2,413 m (7,917 ft)

Geography
- Location within California
- Country: United States
- State: California
- Region: Sierra Nevada
- District: Madera County
- Range coordinates: 37°30′28″N 119°21′6″W
- Topo map: USGS Timber Knob

The Balls are a mountain range within the Sierra Nevada, in Madera County, California. They are "glacier-carved granite domes" and have been described as "looking like smooth scoops of butterscotch ice cream". The mountain range has federal protection as part of the Sierra National Forest.

== Climbing ==
The Balls have been used for rock climbing since at least the 1970s. A 1980 account in the American Alpine Journal noted earlier climbing by Royal Robbins and his Rockcraft group, although many of their ascents were not recorded. The account identified four principal domes, tentatively named Ski Track Dome, Little Dome, Tempest Dome and Big Red, and documented several climbing routes established on Tempest Dome in 1980.
