= Mara Balls =

Finnish musician

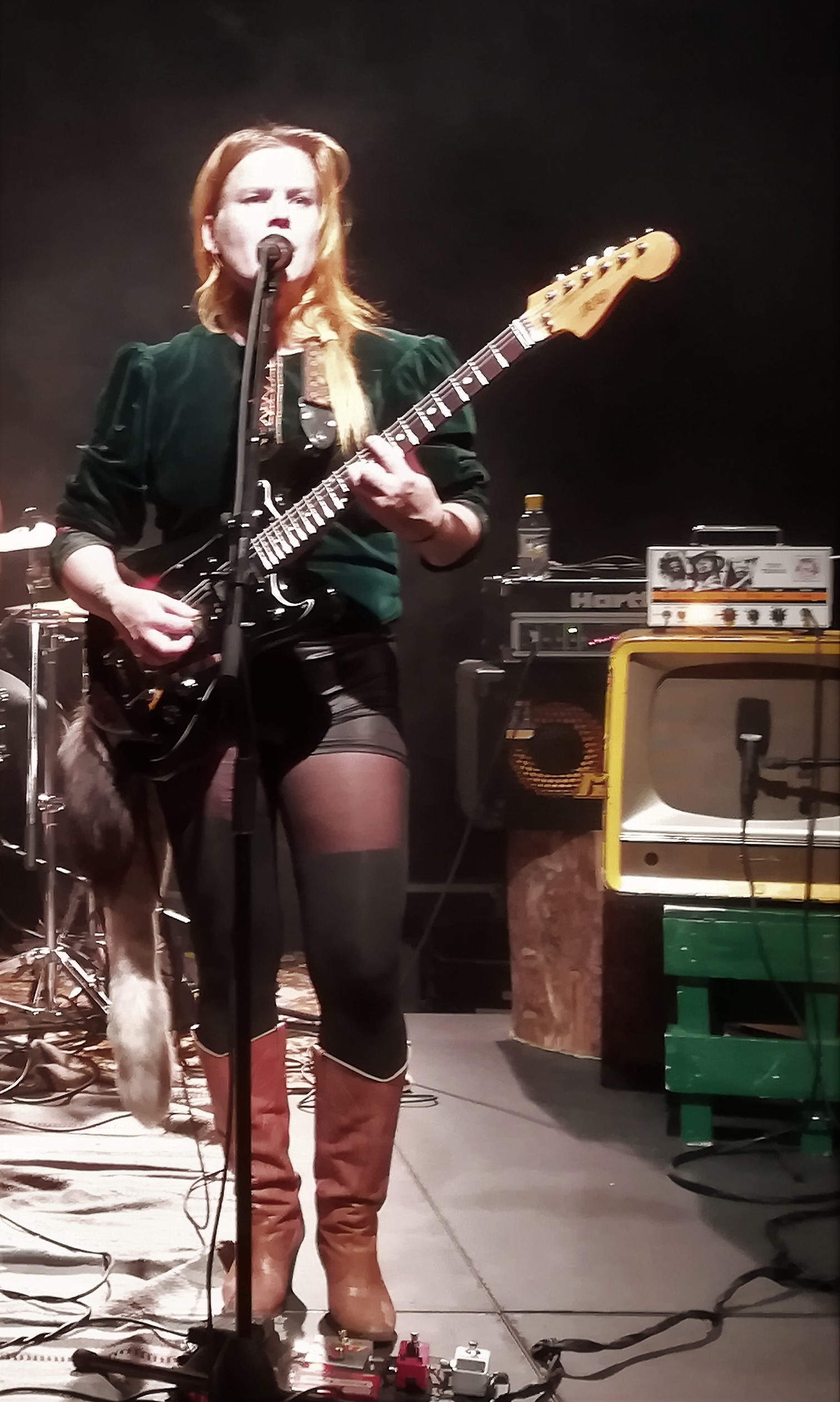
Mara Balls in 2018

Mara Balls (real name Maria Elina Mattila, born 1983 in Hamina) is a Finnish singer-songwriter, rock guitarist, and artist. She was the bassist of Jukka ja Jytämimmit. After the band broke up, she set up her own band with bassist Aapo Palonen and drummer Antti Palmu.

Mattila received the Newcomer of the Year Award at the Finnish Blues Awards gala. She has also been active developing city culture, for which the city of Tampere awarded her 2014.

== Discography ==
=== With Jukka ja Jytämimmit ===
- Jytää vaan (2015, Keltaiset Levyt)

=== As Mara Balls ===
- Vuorten taa (2016, Maran Lafka/Stupido Records)
- Elävä kivi (2017, Maran Lafka/Stupido Records)
- Maranormaali ilmiö (2022)
