= Robert T. Ball Jr. =

Public health and infectious disease specialist

Robert T. Ball Jr. is a public health and infectious disease specialist who discovered the first case of AIDS in South Carolina.

== Personal life and education ==
Ball was born in Charleston, South Carolina. He attended the College of Charleston and the Medical University of South Carolina, studying internal medicine. He completed his medical residency at the University of Alabama, Birmingham. During his college years, he was conservative in his views, participating in the John Birch Society. Ball was drafted during the Vietnam War and sent to work at the William Beaumont Army Medical Center for two years.

== Medical research ==
Ball opened a private practice in the Charleston neighborhood of West Ashley in 1977, where he diagnosed the state's first recorded case of Legionnaires' disease and was one of the first physicians in South Carolina to diagnose a case of toxic shock syndrome.

In 1982 Ball made the first formal AIDS diagnosis in the state of South Carolina. This patient, known as Patient No.1, donated blood that was used as a national positive control sample for AIDS testing until 1983. He became known as the "AIDS doctor," and while AIDS patients sought him out for treatment, non-AIDS patients left, bankrupting his practice. Many of Ball's medical partners refused to treat patients with AIDS. In 1987 he was forced to sell his practice and leave Charleston for Columbia, South Carolina where he earned a Master's degree in Public Health. While working for the Department of Health and Environmental Control, Ball led a state task force, creating the South Carolina Ryan White Care Act which provided service and care for South Carolina patients with AIDS.

Despite retiring from the South Carolina Department of Health and Environmental Control (DHEC) in 2012, Ball continues to be active in the state's response to COVID-19.
