= Ernest Aubrey Ball =

Ernest Aubrey Ball (22 December 1909, Grady County, Oklahoma – 30 August 1997, Santa Cruz) was an American professor of botany and a pioneer of meristem culture.

== Education and career ==
After secondary education in Chickasha, Oklahoma, Ball studied for brief periods from 1931 to 1933 at Los Angeles City College and from 1933 to 1934 at the University of California, Los Angeles. He enrolled in 1935 at the University of Oklahoma and graduated there in 1937 with a B.S. in botany and in 1938 with an M.S. in botany. He received a Ph.D. in 1941 from the University of California, Berkeley.

Ball worked from 1941 to 1942 at Yale University, from 1942 to 1943 at the Carnegie Institution, and from 1943 to 146 at Harvard University. From 1946 to 1968 he was in the botany department of North Carolina State University. He was a Guggenheim Fellow for the academic year 1960–1961. From 1968 to 1977 he was a professor of botany at the University of Irvine. There he worked with Joseph Arditti on tissue culture of orchid leaf cells. In 1977 Ball moved to the University of California, Santa Cruz to continue working on tissue culture in redwoods.

... Ernest A. Ball excised Nasturtium and Tropaeolum shoot tips and grew them in a test tube. He excised the shoot tips with scalpels made of razor blade corners spot welded onto sewing needles which could be inserted into wooden holders. ... Ball published his meristem culture findings in 1946 and instantly became one of the most prominent botanists of his era. Ernie continued to carry out research and added to his initial findings, but he was a basic scientist and paid limited if any attention to the practical implications of his work. Others used his findings to develop practical methods, but failed to cite him. As a result, few knew or became aware of the fact that he was the "father" (or "uncle") of plant propagation through tissue culture (micropropagation).

In the 1970s and 1980s, the Simpson Timber Company invested in Ball's research on tissue-cultured redwoods. He planted 300 cloned redwoods on the U.C. Irvine campus but by 2012 most were dead and the remainder were in poor condition.

== Selected publications ==
- Ball, Ernest A.; Harborne, Jeffrey B.; Arditti, Joseph (1972). "Anthocyanins of Dimorphotheca (Compositae). I. Identity of Pigments in Flowers, Stems, and Callus Cultures". American Journal of Botany. 59 (9): 924–930. doi:10.1002/j.1537-2197.1972.tb10168.x.
- —— (1972). "The Surface "Histogen" of Living Shoot Apices". The Dynamics of Meristem Cell Populations. Advances in Experimental Medicine and Biology. Vol. 18. pp. 75–100. doi:10.1007/978-1-4684-3207-7_5. ISBN 978-1-4684-3209-1.
- —— (1976). "Plant Cytodifferentiation Cytodifferentiation in Plants: Xylogenesis as a Model System Lorin W. Roberts". BioScience. 26 (12): 772. doi:10.2307/1297512. JSTOR 1297512. 1976
- —— (1981). "Development of guayule (Parthenium argentatum) research in cell culture". NASA Technical Reports Server.
- Ernst, Robert; ——; Arditti, Joseph (1982). "Biological Effects of Surfactants. V. Growth and Anthocyanin Production by Callus Cultures of Dimorphotheca". American Journal of Botany. 69 (8): 1340–1345. doi:10.1002/j.1537-2197.1982.tb13381.x.
- —— (1987). "Tissue Culture Multiplication of Sequoia". Cell and Tissue Culture in Forestry. Forestry Sciences. Vol. 24–26. pp. 146–158. doi:10.1007/978-94-017-0992-7_11. ISBN 978-90-481-8301-2.
