= Catherine Ball =

Australian businesswoman and scientist

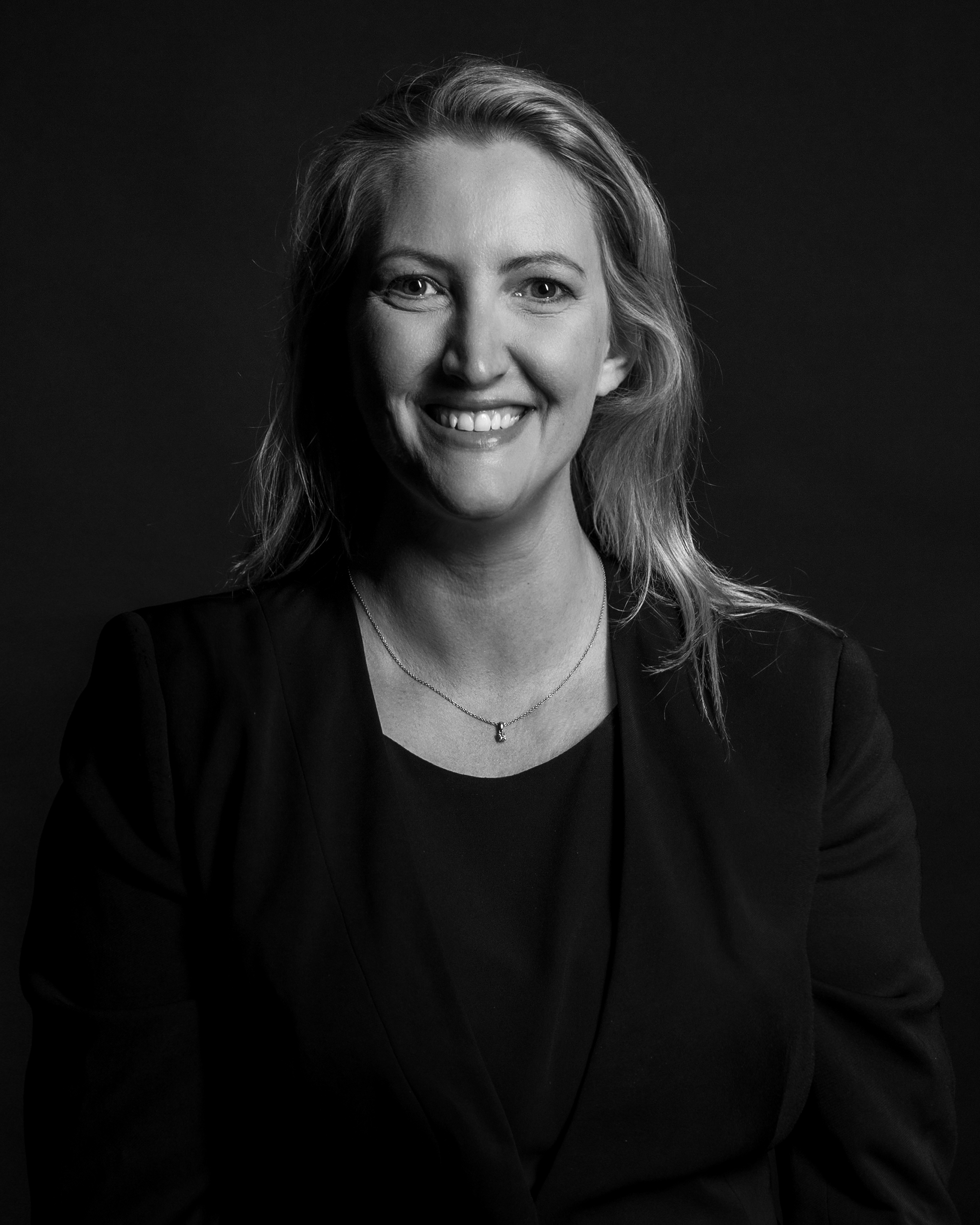
Dr Catherine Ball

Catherine Ball is a businesswoman, scientific futurist, and environmental scientist, noted for her work in the field of drone technology for environmental conservation. She is an honorary associate professor at Australian National University in the College of Systems and Society, where she contributes to research and education in emerging technologies and their applications. Ball works on a range of projects from the making of documentaries, to conferences, and to advising on novel approaches across environmental and humanitarian projects.

Ball's expertise ranges across several areas including environmental monitoring, technology and more specifically the integration of emerging technologies into scientific research and science communication.

== Early life and education ==
Ball's interest in science grew from her father, who worked on an oil rig in the North Sea and had engineering-related hobbies, and her exposure to Star Wars and wildlife documentaries on the BBC. She studied at Newcastle University where she achieved a BSc Honours in Environmental Protection and PhD in Spatial Ecology and Descriptive and Predictive Statistics.

== Innovation and contributions ==
Ball founded World of Drones and Robotics Global, based in Brisbane, Australia. This organisation runs the annual World of Drones and Robotics Congress and associated trade exhibition. These conferences have led to projects that have used drones to find people who are lost in the wilderness and to help communities manage bushfire risks and endangered species. She addressed the underuse of drones which had potential to help when used correctly. Her method to solve this problem was to create conferences for people to share their ideas in a more open space and foster innovation that could make an impact.

She has contributed to the spread of information about drones throughout Australia and internationally. Her innovation of the conferences has encouraged the adoption of drones for novel applications in environmental monitoring and disaster response. Her work towards this has led to drones being integrated into information-gathering practices on a large scale.

== Awards ==
Ball's awards include 2020 Analytics Insight World's 50 Most Renowned Women in Robotics Award, 2016 Top 25 Women in Robotics List, the 2017 Women in Leadership Awards – Finalist Innovation Category, 2016 Financial Review and Westpac 100 Women of Influence among others.

== Publications ==
- Ball, Catherine (2022). Converge: A futurist's insights into the potential of our world as technology and humanity collide.
- Ball, Catherine (2016). Gumption trigger : real stories of grit, resilience, and determination from award winning Australian business women. [Kangaroo Point, Qld.] ISBN 9780995422605.
- Tatham, Peter; Ball, Catherine; Wu, Yong; Diplas, Peter (1 January 2017). "Long-endurance remotely piloted aircraft systems (LE-RPAS) support for humanitarian logistic operations: The current position and the proposed way ahead". Journal of Humanitarian Logistics and Supply Chain Management. 7 (1): 2–25. doi:10.1108/JHLSCM-05-2016-0018. ISSN 2042-6747.
- Tatham, P.; Ball, C. M.; Wu, Y.; Diplas, P. (2017), "Using Long Endurance Remotely Piloted Aircraft Systems to Support Humanitarian Logistic Operations: A Case Study of Cyclone Winston", Smart Technologies for Emergency Response and Disaster Management, IGI Global, pp. 264–277, ISBN 978-1-5225-2575-2
