= John Bull (1800 ship) =

History

France
- Name: Unknown
- Captured: c.1799

Great Britain
- Name: John Bull
- Owner: T. Mallet
- Acquired: c.1799, by purchase of a prize
- Fate: Wrecked March 1810

General characteristics
- Tons burthen: 162 (bm)
- Complement: 1800:50; 1801:60; 1803:6
- Armament: 1800:8 × 6&9-pounder guns; 1801:16 × 12,9,&6-pounder guns; 1803:12 × 6&4-pounder guns

John Bull was a vessel of French origin that from 1800 to circa 1805 sailed as a British privateer operating out of Jersey. Her master was plaintiff in a notable case involving the law of salvage. She returned to mercantile trading and was wrecked in 1810.

== Career ==
John Bull entered the Register of Shipping in 1800, and her captain, John LeGeyt, acquired a letter of marque on 4 February 1800.

In February 1801, the Jersey privateer John Bull captured a French brig that was carrying 624 hogsheads of claret from Bordeaux to St Sebastian, and also captured a French brig carrying wheat.

LeGeyt's successor, Noah Le Sueur, acquired a letter of marque on 29 July 1801. The size of her crew for these two letters is such that it is clear that John Bull was a privateer. During the French Revolutionary Wars Jersey privateers averaged one man for every two tons of burthen; during the Napoleonic Wars the average dropped to one man per five tons. These ratios greatly exceeded the number of men required to crew the vessels. The extra men were intended as prize crews in captured vessels.

After the resumption of war with France, Noah Le Sueur acquired a new letter of marque on 16 July 1803. Her crew was one-tenth the size of her earlier crew and her armament was reduced in size and numbers, suggesting that she was now simply trading between London and Jersey.

Still, Le Sueur did have a letter of marque. On 18 August 1803, the British privateer Roebuck captured the Spanish vessel Carlotta, Carlos Pasqua, master. The brig Carlotta was on her way from the River Plate to London. Then on 5 September, the French privateer Caroline, of Bordeaux, recaptured Carlotta. (Note: Caroline was a 180-ton privateer commissioned in March 1800. In 1800 she cruised under the command of Captain Duviella with 21 men. She made another cruise from 1802 to September 1803 under Captain Alexis Bolle with 35 to 115 men and eight to ten 6-pounder guns. HMS Constance captured Caroline in September 1803.) But on 18 September, Le Sueur and John Bull recaptured Carlotta and took her into Jersey. Le Sueur claimed salvage from the owners of the recaptured vessel and its cargo.

In December 1803, Judge Scott, of the High Court of Admiralty, ruled against LeSueur. The issue was that Carlotta was Spanish, and Spain was neutral. Prior to the French Revolutionary Wars salvage had not been payable on recaptured neutral property. During the French Revolutionary Wars this rule had been allowed to lapse and recaptured neutral property was subject to payment of salvage. However, Scott ruled that in the war that had begun in 1803, the French had improved their handling of prizes. Therefore, it was time to re-institute the original principle of no salvage being due on recaptured neutral property.

Year	Master	Owner	Trade	Source
1810	B.LeFevre	Nicoll, Jr.	Liverpool–Brazils	RS; new wales and good repair 1805

== Loss ==
Between 4 and 8 March 1810, a severe gale struck the west coast of Portugal and Spain, destroying and damaging many vessels. John Bull, with Lefevre as master, was driven on shore at the Tagus River. Her entry in the 1810 volume of the Register of Shipping has the annotation, "Lost".
