= John Bull (1799 ship) =

History

Great Britain
- Name: John Bull
- Namesake: John Bull
- Owner: 1799:Taylor & Co. (Note: Michael Taylor, Thomas Bailey, Ralph Cantrell, & Roger Grimshaw.); 1802:Dailgairns; 1803:M. Benson
- Builder: Liverpool
- Launched: 1799
- Fate: Last listed in 1833

General characteristics
- Tons burthen: 464, or 480 or 484 (bm)
- Sail plan: Ship rigged
- Complement: 1800:40; 1801:65; 1803:40
- Armament: 1799: 28 × 9- & 18-pounder guns; 1800: 24 × 4- & 9-pounder guns + 4 × 12-pounder carronades; 1801: 24 × 9- & 18-pounder guns; 1803: 20 × 9- & 18-pounder guns; 1805: 8 × 9- & 12-pounder guns; 1808: 8 × 9-pounder guns

John Bull was a sailing ship built in 1799 at Liverpool for the trade in enslaved people. She made one voyage carrying captives from West Africa to Jamaica. Thereafter she became a West Indiaman, trading with Jamaica. Early in this period she was a letter of marque, and captured a French merchant vessel. A little later John Bull detained an American vessel. Much later she transported female convicts to New South Wales from Cork. After she delivered her convicts she made an unsuccessful voyage as a whaler in the South Pacific. She was last listed in 1833.

== Career ==
John Bull entered Lloyd's Register in 1799. Her master was Parkinson, her owner Taylor & Co., and her trade, Liverpool-Africa. Captain John Parkinson acquired a letter of marque for John Bull on 23 July 1799. Under his command she made one voyage as a slaver.

Voyage transporting enslaved people (1799–1800): She sailed from Liverpool on 5 September 1799 bound for the Bight of Biafra and Gulf of Guinea islands. In 1799, 156 vessels sailed from English ports, bound for the trade in enslaved people; 134 of these vessels sailed from Liverpool.

John Bull acquired captives at Bonny and delivered them to Kingston, Jamaica, where she arrived on 29 July 1800 with 550 captives. She left Kingston on 5 October and arrived back at Liverpool on 24 December. She had left with 68 crew members and she suffered 21 crew deaths on her voyage.

In 1801, Henry Kelly replaced Parkinson as master, and her trade became London-Jamaica. Kelly received a letter of marque on 12 March 1801. The application for the letter evidences a large increase in her crew size, suggesting that she was going to engage in privateering.

However, in 1802 her ownership changed from Taylor to Dalgairns. Then in 1803 her ownership changed to M. Benson, and her master to J. Murray. On 31 May John Murray, of the ship John Bull, received a letter of marque.

In July 1803 a vessel arriving at Falmouth reported that she had encountered the privateer John Bull, of 28 guns, of Liverpool. John Bull and the privateer Union, of Guernsey, had captured a large French vessel from Île de France and taken her into Bantry Bay.

Also in 1803 John Bull captured a small French merchant vessel trading with the West Indies. (Note: Her captain-owner, Frederic Bardie, alias Peter Wood, ended up in the prison ship Canada then (c.1810) in the Medway. In a fit of anger he attacked and stabbed one of the marine guards, for which he was hanged at Newgate.)

In 1805, John Bull's master was H. Kelly, changing to J. Murray. Her ownership and trade remained unchanged.

On 13 January 1809, Patriarch, Easton, master, came into Port Royal, Jamaica, having been detained by John Bull, Askew, master. Patriarch had been sailing from Baltimore to Charleston.

Year	Master	Owner	Trade
1805	H. Kelly; J. Murray	M. Benson	Liverpool-Jamaica
1808	J. Askew	R. Benson	Liverpool-Jamaica
1810	J. Askew	M. Benson	Liverpool-Jamaica
1815	J. Askew	R. Benson	Liverpool-Jamaica
1819	J. Askew; W. Corlett	R. Benson	Liverpool-Jamaica; Liverpool-Calcutta
1820	W. Corlett	Hibberson	Liverpool-Calcutta

In 1819 John Bull received a license from the British East India Company to sail east of Cape Town. On 8 March 1820 she came into Cape Town from Liverpool and Teneriffe having lost her anchors and cables. She sailed for Bengal about a week later. John Bull arrived at Liverpool on 19 January 1821, having left Madras on 8 September 1820.

On 5 June 1821, John Bull towed Jane, Brabin, master, into Cork, Ireland. Jane had been sailing from Balmaura when she lost her masts and rigging. That same day surgeon William Elyard, who with his family had just arrived in Cork on John Barry, transferred to John Bull.

Year	Master	Owner	Trade	Source & notes
1821	W. Corlett	Hibberson	Liverpool-Calcutta; Liverpool-New South Wales	LR

Under the command of William Corlette John Bull arrived at Cork on 5 June, bound for New South Wales. She sailed from Cork on 25 July 1821. She sailed via St. Jago and arrived at Port Jackson on 18 December. John Bull carried free passengers and 80 female convicts. No prisoners died en route. Discontent among the crew developed from Corlette and Elyard's disciplinary measures, aimed at preventing prostitution between crew and prisoners. The discontent did not, however, rise to the level of mutiny.

John Bull sailed from Port Jackson for the Society and Friendly Islands. She returned to Port Jackson on 17 April 1823 after an unsuccessful cruise of 15 months. This was a whaling cruise. On 25 October there was an auction of her extra stores, consisting of casks, iron hoops, copper coolers, harpoons, whale lines, whale boats, etc. Also, a small cutter, built of English materials, about 22 tons burthen, with numerous other articles was also on offer. A second auction, on 11 November, offered the remaining casks, shooks, harpoons, lances, spades, whale lines, etc., and one whale boat. Also her shallop, "nearly completed, and lying at the Government Wharf, with Chain Cable, Anchor, and Pump. Captain Corlett was expected to sail immediately thereafter to the River Derwent, Tasmania to acquire a cargo of "black oil". She finally sailed from Hobart on 2 December with 1600 cedar logs, 10 tons of sperm oil, and wool. She was going to sail via Rio de Janeiro.

Year	Master	Owner	Trade	Source & notes
1824	W.Corlett; W.Grave	Hibberson	Liverpool–New South Wales; Liverpool-Havana	LR; large repair 1818 & damages repaired 1821
1830	W. Grave	Hibberson	At Cowes	LR
1833	W. Grave	Hibberson	At Cowes	LR

== Fate ==
She was in Prince's Dock, Liverpool in 1833 and the owners owed monies for docking. She disappeared from Lloyd's Register after 1833.
