= Robert Ball (artist) =

Robert Ball RBSA (1918–2008) was an artist born in Birmingham. At age twelve he was taught memory drawing at the Moseley Road School of Art. Here under his teacher Mr Wiley, who he refers to as 'Baggy' he learnt the method of not drawing from an object but instead to sit and visualize the subject for some time first before drawing it, which was a method he adhered to for the rest of his life. He continued this technique at the Birmingham School of Art and his talent allowed him to obtain a scholarship at the Royal College of Art. Ball then taught at the Birmingham School of Art, until he became principal at the Stroud Art College. His preferred mediums were printing, painting and wood engraving.

He was an Associate of both the Royal Birmingham Society of Artists and the Royal Institute of Engravers in 1943, and became a full Member of the RBSA in 1949.

Ball is considered to be the greatest printmaker of his generation. He created etchings and engravings based on the subject matter of life in Birmingham. This included images of industrial life, people at work and portraits. An interest for Ball was, in particular, the image of the labourer prior to the invention of mechanization. This can be seen in his work, The Quarry at Rowley Regis (1939) shows how humans worked as a machine, using all their power to push the laden hopper up the steep hill.

After Ball's death in 2008 an exhibition named Family Perspectives was held, showcasing art from five generations of his family, next to his own paintings, engravings and drawings.
