= Edward Hughes Ball Hughes =

English dandy (1798–1863)

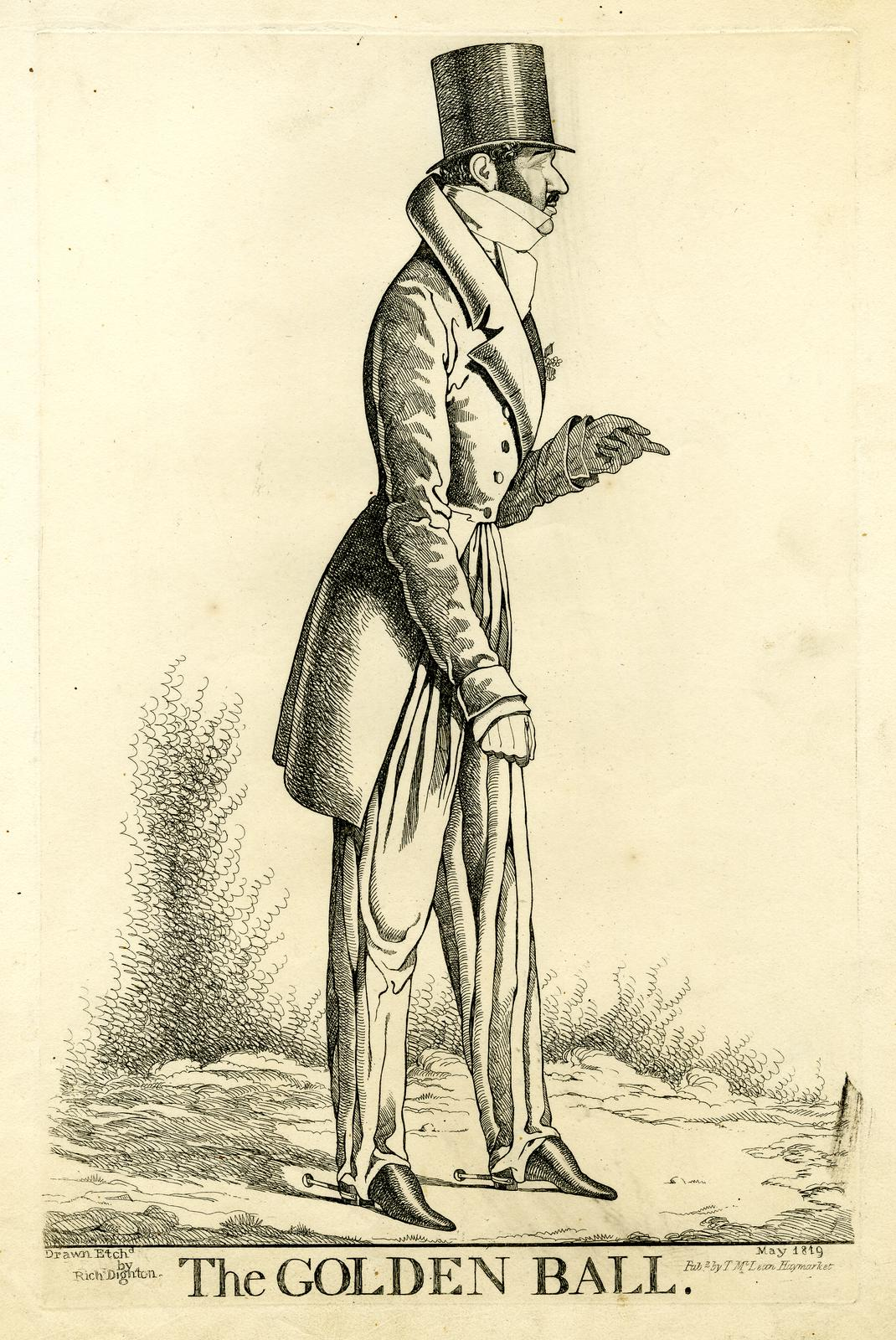
Ball Hughes in 1819 (etching by Richard Dighton)

Edward Hughes Ball Hughes (28 May 1798 – 10 March 1863), also known as "The Golden Ball", was an English dandy known for his extravagant lifestyle.

== Life ==
Hughes was born in Lambourne, Essex, and was educated at Eton and Trinity College, Cambridge. He purchased a cornetcy in the 7th Hussars in 1817 but left army life in 1819 to enjoy his fortune. He soon attracted attention for his wealth and extravagance, with etchings of him publicly available as early as 1819. Hughes was a handsome man who was known for his chocolate-coloured coach and his invention of the black cravat.

In 1823 he suddenly married Maria Mercandotti, a 16-year-old Spanish dancer, who left a theatre full of patrons waiting in vain to see her. Ainsworth quipped, "The damsel is gone, and no wonder at all / that, bred to the dance, she is gone to a Ball." They later separated and were divorced in 1839.

In 1824 Hughes purchased Oatlands Palace from the Duke of York (although the sale was not final until 1827 due to problems with the deed). The later sale of the grounds for housing lots (creating the modern community of Oatlands) was a profitable venture for Hughes.

Hughes lost enormous sums through extravagant living and gambling; a pamphlet published in 1824 warned him by name about gamblers who would take his money. He was forced to move to France in 1829 to avoid his creditors, and his affairs were left in the hands of his solicitors, Freere and Forster, who sent him an allowance to live on. He still had substantial sums; according to a government report, he was one of the foreign investors in the Second Bank of the United States in 1832, holding $51,000 in stock.

In 1834 Hughes came into the possession of the manor of Sidmouth. In 1835 he helped finance a new sea wall for the town. In 1839 a law was passed by Parliament allowing Hughes to tear down the market and build a new one. An 1846 law confirmed that the new market had been built and that no one could sell anything in the manor except at the market, unless they paid a toll at the market building.

== Family ==
Many stories were told about Hughes' origins and family, most of them untrue. His grandmother Ruth, after her first husband, a Mr. Ball, had died, married Admiral Edward Hughes. Admiral Hughes advanced the career of his wife's eldest son, Captain Henry Ball, who served under him as captain of his flagship Superb in India, but Henry predeceased him. Admiral Hughes died in 1794 without issue, and Edward Hughes Ball, son of Ruth's second son David Ball (c. 1760–1798), inherited the Hughes money (40,000 pounds a year, an enormous fortune) upon turning 21; he adopted the Hughes last name at that time. Ball Hughes' mother's name was Sarah; she later remarried, to a man named Thomas Johnson.

Hughes' older sister Catherine Ball was a socialite, journalist, and novelist who eventually styled herself the "Baroness de Calabrella" after acquiring property in Italy. She married an older man, the Rev. Francis Lee, at the age of 16 in 1804, without her mother's permission, and was separated from him in 1810 on charges of adultery; her lover, Captain George de Blaquiere, was successfully sued by Lee for criminal conversation. She was later a friend of the Countess of Blessington and married the Countess' first patron, Thomas Jenkins. Another sister, Ruth, married Houlton Hartwell, son of Admiral Francis Hartwell, in 1812; he was one of the Prince Regent's chaplains. A third sister, Sydney, married Sir John Ignatius Burke, 10th Baronet of Glinsk. There was a fourth sister, Elizabeth Ball. Despite the similarity in names and dates, the sculptor Robert Ball Hughes is unrelated.

Hughes had several relationships while in France, although it is unclear whether he actually remarried. With actress Eliza Breugnot Monborne he had three children: Edward Seymour (1831–1867); Adeline Eleanor (1833–?), and Sydney Matilda (1835–1908). Edward Seymour died in 1867 in Dieppe after his horse fell on him; d'Orsay had made a portrait of him as a young man. Adeline married Ernest Louis Auguste Graves Van der Smissen (1824–95), the brother of Alfred Baron Van der Smissen (1823–95), a notable Belgian general. Sydney Matilda married first Emile Lagarde, and after his death Louis Alphonse Evrard in 1881. In 1871 Sydney and a companion, Julien Garnuchot, were convicted of defrauding creditors, including an elderly field marshal named Baron Schwarz-Wieler, and sentenced to prison and labour.

Edward Hughes Ball Hughes later had several children with Anne Henriette de Dauvet: Edward Edmund Hughes Ball Hughes (1850–?) and Kate Henrietta Edwardine Hughes Ball Hughes (1851–?). He died at St. Germains, France, aged 64.

== Portraits ==
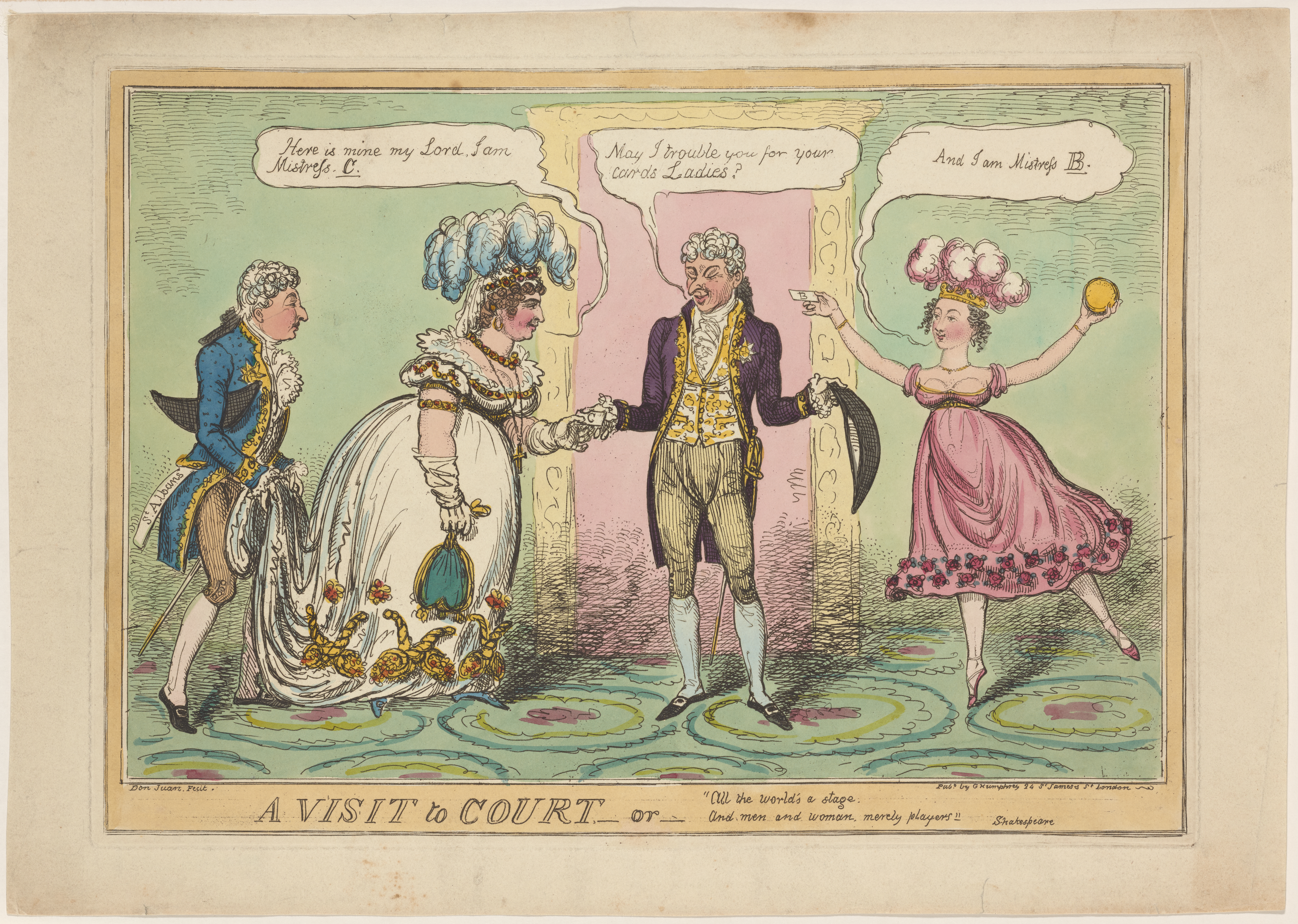
Cruikshank's 1825 caricature shows Ball Hughes' wife holding a golden ball.

A drawing of Hughes by Alfred d'Orsay is in the National Portrait Gallery in London. d'Orsay and Hughes were acquainted; Hughes' sister Catherine married Thomas Jenkins, an early patron of the Countess of Blessington, d'Orsay's friend and patroness, and Hughes attended d'Orsay's funeral. A color plate of Hughes, Mercandotti, her former patron the Earl of Fife, and others appears in Bernard Blackmantle's The English Spy (1825/6). There exist a number of contemporary caricatures of Hughes and his wife; for example, Richard Dighton published an etching of Hughes in 1819 titled The Golden Ball, and an 1825 caricature by Robert Cruikshank satirised Hughes' wife's new-found respectability. Hughes was included in a 1932 set of "Dandies" cigarette cards published by Player's.

== In literature ==
As a colourful figure of the Regency period, Hughes is mentioned in Georgette Heyer's Sylvester, False Colours, Arabella ‘’((Regency Buck))’’ and Cotillion along with Jeffery Farnol's The Amateur Gentleman, among other works set in the Regency period.
