= Robert Ball (judoka) =

Australian judoka

Personal information
- Nationality: Australian
- Born: 26 October 1964 (age 60); Newcastle, New South Wales, Australia

Sport
- Sport: Judo

Robert Ball (born 26 October 1964) is an Australian judoka. He competed in the men's heavyweight event at the 2000 Summer Olympics.
