= Ball, Cornwall =

Hamlet in Cornwall, England

Coordinates: 50.5242°N 4.8196°W

Ball: Cornish: Pelen
- Location within Cornwall
- OS grid reference: SX 002 731
- Civil parish: Wadebridge
- Unitary authority: Cornwall
- Ceremonial county: Cornwall
- Region: South West
- Country: England
- Sovereign state: United Kingdom
- Post town: WADEBRIDGE
- Postcode district: PL27
- Dialling code: 01208
- Police: Devon and Cornwall
- Fire: Cornwall
- Ambulance: South Western
- UK Parliament: North Cornwall

Ball (Cornish: Pelen) is a hamlet on the outskirts of Wadebridge in north Cornwall, England, United Kingdom.

The hamlet lies on a loop off the A39 road about 1 mile east of the town centre at grid reference SX 002 731 and lends its name to the roundabout at the east end of the Wadebridge bypass.
