= Alf Ball (footballer, born 1890) =

English footballer

Personal information
- Full name: Alfred Ball
- Date of birth: 1890
- Place of birth: Clowne, England
- Date of death: 3 October 1952 (aged 61–62)
- Height: 5 ft 7 in (1.70 m)
- Position: Outside left

Senior career*
Years	Team	Apps	(Gls)
- Clowne Rising Star
- Cresswell Athletic
1913–1921	Lincoln City (Note: Figures are for appearances and goals in the Football League only. The free-access sections of the Lincoln City FC Archive do not separate appearances by competition other than for the Football League.)	97	(13)
- Mansfield Town
	Ilkeston United	??	(1)
- * Club domestic league appearances and goals

Alfred Ball (1890 – 3 October 1952) was an English professional footballer who made 97 appearances in the Football League for Lincoln City. He played as an outside left. He also played for Midland League club Mansfield Town and for Ilkeston United of the Central Alliance.

== Life and career ==
Ball was born in Clowne, Derbyshire. He made his debut for Football League Second Division club Lincoln City in November 1913, and the following season – the last before the Football League was suspended for the duration of the First World War – he missed only one game. He was ever-present in the first postwar season as Lincoln finished 21st in the Second Division and failed to gain re-election, and missed only one match as they won the Midland League title and returned to the Football League as founder members of the Third Division North. Ball did not return with them: he remained in the Midland League, with Mansfield Town, and by late 1922 was playing for Central Alliance club Ilkeston United.

Ball died in 1952 aged about 62.
