= David Ball (sport shooter) =

British sport shooter

David Ball is a British sport shooter who lives in Banks, Lancashire.

== Target shooting ==
Ball, who has previously competed at the highest level, now participates in Down-The-Line tournaments across the UK and coaches clay pigeon shooting. Ball has collaborated with Andy Waddington, the son of sports shooter David Waddington. Following the training, Waddington finished first in England's junior DTL shooting competition in 2004.

Ball is sponsored by Express Cartridges. The manufacturers of this product have Ball on the cover of their cartridge boxes for promotion.
