= Alf Ball (footballer, born 1873) =

English footballer

Personal information
- Full name: Aloysius Ball
- Date of birth: 7 December 1873
- Place of birth: Preston, England
- Date of death: 1940 (aged 66–67)
- Position: Half back

Senior career*
Years	Team	Apps	(Gls)
1893–1894	Preston North End	5	(0)
1896	Kettering		
1897–1900	Leicester Fosse	75	(3)
1900	Nelson		
Total		80	(3)
- * Club domestic league appearances and goals

Aloysius Ball (7 December 1873 – 1940) was an English footballer who played in the Football League for Leicester Fosse and Preston North End.
