= John Ball (assemblyman) =

American politician

John Ball (February 10, 1756 – November 7, 1838) was an American soldier and politician.

== Personal ==
Ball was born in Bedford, Westchester County, New York in 1756. He was the second son of Eliphalet Ball, minister of the Presbyterian Church there, and Elizabeth van Flamen. In 1769 the family relocated to Ballston in Saratoga County, New York, then a thinly-settled wilderness. Around 1777 he married Mary Collins, daughter of Tyrannus Collins and Abigail Peck; the couple had one son and four daughters. In 1808 he married Anna Swart, daughter of Dirick Swart, and they had two sons and two daughters. John Ball died in Ballston in 1838; his burial site is unknown.

== Military career ==
In 1777 he fought at the Siege of Fort Stanwix as a lieutenant under Colonel Cornelius D. Wynkoop. He rose to the rank of colonel of militia, and afterwards was often titled "Colonel Ball".

== Political career ==
John Ball was elected Justice of the Peace in 1791. He became Supervisor of the Town of Milton in 1792. He was elected to the New York State Assembly in 1793 from Saratoga County. In 1794 he was appointed one of five commissioners charged with locating the county seat, courthouse, and jail of Saratoga County. He ran unsuccessfully for the Assembly in 1796, and for the New York State Senate in 1799.
