= John Ball (clergyman) =

African-American Methodist preacher in Shelburne, Nova Scotia

John Ball was an African-American Methodist preacher in Shelburne, Nova Scotia. John Ball is recorded in the Book of Negroes as one of the 3,000 African Americans who escaped to the British lines during the American Revolution.

== Life in Nova Scotia and immigration to Sierra Leone ==
John Ball is most likely the preacher John Marrant encountered in Nova Scotia. John Ball went around preaching to African American expatriates in order to convert them to Methodism. Ball himself was converted to Methodism by another black preacher Moses 'Daddy' Wilkinson who was from South Carolina. Alongside other African-American preachers Boston King, David George, Moses Wilkinson, and Cato Perkins, John Ball immigrated to Sierra Leone and became a settler in Sierra Leone. One thousand, two hundred American blacks immigrated to Sierra Leone and established Settler Town, Sierra Leone. These African American settlers were preceded by four hundred African-American, Black British, and West Indian settlers who were the first blacks ever to go back to Africa. The four hundred blacks were known as the Black Poor and they established Cline Town, Sierra Leone.

== Sources ==
- Tony Pace. "John Ball". Archived from the original on 2008-02-19.
- Halpenny, F.G. (1983). Dictionary of Canadian Biography. Vol. 5. University of Toronto Press. p. 341. ISBN 9780802033987.
- Sanneh, L. (2009). Abolitionists Abroad: American Blacks and the Making of Modern West Africa. Harvard University Press. p. 77. ISBN 9780674043077.
- Walker, J.W.S.G. (1992). The Black Loyalists: The Search for a Promised Land in Nova Scotia and Sierra Leone, 1783-1870. University of Toronto Press. p. 126. ISBN 9780802074027.
- Ball, E. (1998). Slaves in the Family. Ballantine Books. ISBN 9780345431059.
- Tony Pace. "The Wesleyans". Archived from the original on 2007-11-17.
