= John Ball (musician) =

American musician (born 1990)

- Born: John Thomas Ball; May 10, 1990 (age 36); Birmingham, Alabama
- Genres: Worship, Christian pop, Christian rock, Christian alternative rock, folk rock, indie rock, indie folk, alternative rock
- Occupations: Singer, songwriter, guitarist, worship leader
- Instruments: Vocals, guitar, bass guitar
- Years active: 2009–present
- Member of: The Sleep Design
- Website: johnballmusic.com

John Thomas Ball (born May 10, 1990) is an American Christian musician and guitarist, who plays alternative rock, folk rock, indie folk and indie rock music. He has released three extended plays, Found Among the Broken (2010), John Ball (2013), and By Declaration & the Death (2016).

== Early life and education ==
John Thomas Ball was born on May 10, 1990, in Birmingham, Alabama, where he graduated from Oak Mountain High School in 2008. He received his baccalaureate degree majoring in music business from Belmont University in 2011. Ball is currently in the process of obtaining his master's degree in theology from Liberty University.

== Career ==
His music career began in 2009 with the band The Sleep Design, where he is the bassist. He released a solo extended play, Found Among the Broken, on November 16, 2010. The subsequent extended play, John Ball, was released on May 21, 2013. His third extended play, By Declaration & the Death, was released on February 12, 2016.

== Discography ==
=== Extended plays ===
- Found Among the Broken (2010)
- John Ball (2013)
- By Declaration & the Death (2016)
