= Jack Ball (footballer, born 1923) =

English footballer

Personal information
- Full name: John Albert Ball
- Date of birth: 16 July 1923
- Place of birth: Brighton, England
- Date of death: July 1999 (aged 75–76)
- Place of death: Brighton, England
- Height: 6 ft 1 in (1.85 m)
- Position: Goalkeeper

Senior career*
Years	Team	Apps	(Gls)
- Vernon Athletic
1940–1953	Brighton & Hove Albion	113	(0)
1953–196?	Hastings United		
- * Club domestic league appearances and goals

John Albert Ball (16 July 1923 – July 1999) was an English professional footballer who made 113 Football League appearances playing as a goalkeeper for Brighton & Hove Albion.

== Life and career ==
Ball was born in Brighton, Sussex, where he attended Brighton Intermediate School. He joined Brighton & Hove Albion from Vernon Athletic in 1940 as an amateur, and turned professional three years later. In March 1943, he joined the RAF, and when competitive football resumed after the war, he made his debut in the Third Division South in October 1946. He broke his wrist a year later, losing his place to Harry Baldwin, and the two shared the position until 1952 when Baldwin left the club. Ball himself left in 1953 and joined Hastings United of the Southern League. He helped that club reach the third round of the FA Cup in both 1953–54 and 1954–55, and remained on their books until the early 1960s. He continued living in Hove, and died in Brighton in 1999.
