= Alan Ball (weightlifter) =

American weightlifter (born 1943)

Personal information
- Born: June 21, 1943 (age 83) Syracuse, New York, U.S.

Sport
- Sport: Weightlifting

Alan Jerome Ball (born June 21, 1943) is an American weightlifter. He competed in the men's heavyweight event at the 1972 Summer Olympics.
